= Wakker Prize =

Prize awarded by the Swiss Heritage Society

The Wakker Prize (German: Wakkerpreis, French: Prix Wakker, Italian: Premio Wakker) is awarded annually by the Swiss Heritage Society to a Municipality of Switzerland for the development and preservation of its architectural heritage.

At the beginning, the prize honoured municipalities which did special needs for preservation of the old towns. Recently, the prize also honours municipalities that develop their townscapes on a specific leading point. This might be an estimated use of an old industrial facility or a successful combination between old and new basic structure of a building.

In 2005, the prize was given to the Swiss Federal Railways, rather than a municipality, because of the jubilee of the Swiss Heritage Society.

The prize is named for Henri-Louis Wakker, a banker and benefactor of the Swiss Heritage Society.

== Criteria ==
To get this prize, municipalities have to follow the named criteria:

- A visible, qualitative development and upgrading of townscape in a contemporary manner.
- To be respectful towards with old settlement pattern.
- An active input for above-average architectural quality, due to a good example of the municipality.
- The current place-planning prefers the development of the prize.
- At the end are following issues important for the overall assessment, protection of the area, sustainability, traffic planning and residential quality.

== Prize winners ==
- 1972: Stein am Rhein
- 1973: St. Prex
- 1974: Wiedlisbach
- 1975: Guarda
- 1976: Grüningen
- 1977: Gais
- 1978: Dardagny
- 1979: Ernen
- 1980: Solothurn
- 1981: Elm
- 1982: Avegno
- 1983: Muttenz
- 1984: Wil
- 1985: Laufenburg
- 1986: Diemtigen
- 1987: Bischofszell
- 1988: Porrentruy
- 1989: Winterthur
- 1990: Montreux
- 1991: Cham
- 1992: St. Gallen
- 1993: Monte Carasso
- 1994: La Chaux-de-Fonds
- 1995: Splügen
- 1996: Basel
- 1997: Bern
- 1998: Vrin
- 1999: Hauptwil-Gottshaus
- 2000: Geneva
- 2001: Uster
- 2002: Turgi
- 2003: Sursee
- 2004: Biel/Bienne
- 2005: Swiss Federal Railways, but especially the "Wave of Berne", the western extension of the Bern railway station
- 2006: Delémont
- 2007: Altdorf
- 2008: Grenchen
- 2009: Yverdon-les-Bains
- 2010: Fläsch
- 2011: Lausanne West (Bussigny-près-Lausanne, Chavannes-près-Renens, Crissier, Ecublens, Prilly, Renens, Saint-Sulpice, Villars-Sainte-Croix and Lausanne)
- 2012: Köniz
- 2013: Sion
- 2014: Aarau
- 2015: Bregaglia
- 2016: Rheinfelden
- 2017: Sempach
- 2018: Origen Festival Cultural, Riom
- 2019: Langenthal
- 2020: Baden
- 2021: Prangins
- 2022: Meyrin
- 2023: Lichtensteig (Toggenburg)
- 2024: Verein Birsstadt (Aesch, Arlesheim, Birsfelden, Dornach, Duggingen, Grellingen, Münchenstein, Muttenz, Pfeffingen and Reinach)
- 2025: Poschiavo
