= Henri-Louis Wakker =

Henri-Louis Wakker (18 March 1875 – 17 March 1972) was a Swiss banker and real estate entrepreneur. His will provided a considerable sum of money without conditions to the Swiss Heritage Society, which in 1972 created the Wakker Prize in his honor. It is awarded yearly for the development and preservation of the architectural heritage in Switzerland.

== Biography ==
He was born in Geneva, Switzerland, the son of a watchmaker. He attended high school there and in southern Germany, where he learned German. In 1905, he was appointed bank director at a bank in Cairo, Egypt. In 1911 he returned home and opened a real estate office, which dealt with the purchase, sale and disposition of land and houses, as well as estate management.

In 1925, Wakker and his business partner Henri Honegger acquired a spacious property in the Eaux-Vives neighborhood of Geneva and commissioned the architects Maurice Bralliard and Henri Vial to design a series of housing developments. The architects' proposal was ambitious, comprising four squares, 51 buildings, and 800 to 900 dwellings. The economic crisis of the time allowed the construction of only the smallest of four properties, the Square de Montchoisy. But the project was influential, being shown at the first Swiss town-planning exhibition and featured in planning journals. It has been called the first example of modern urbanism in Geneva.

In 1936, he had, with Charles Bralliard and Jean-Frédéric Rouiller, created a detailed plan for construction of a crossing of the harbor of Geneva. While it was rejected at the time, it has recently seen reconsideration. In 1955, after 80 years in the real estate trade, he retired.

Henri-Louis Wakker was an avid mountain climber and especially loved the Swiss Alps and the mountains of central Switzerland, with a special fondness for the cities and towns of this area.

He died one day before his 97th birthday, 17 March 1972. He left a considerable sum of money to the Swiss Heritage Society without any conditions. The Executive Board of the Society decided to use the money to fund the Wakker Prize, which is given annually to Swiss municipalities for excellence in cultural and architectural heritage development, and for fostering such development for the future. The prize is 20,000 Swiss Francs.
