= Chavannes-près-Renens =

- Municipality
- Flag Coat of arms
- Location of Chavannes-près-Renens
- Location within Switzerland Location within Canton of Vaud
- Coordinates: 46°32′N 06°35′E
- Country: Switzerland
- Canton: Vaud
- District: Ouest Lausannois

Government
  - Mayor: Syndic; Loubna Laabar Maamar

Area
  - Total: 1.7 km^{2} (0.66 sq mi)
- Elevation: 415 m (1,362 ft)

Population (2003)
  - Total: 5,608
  - Density: 3,300/km^{2} (8,500/sq mi)
- Time zone: UTC+01:00 (CET)
  - Summer (DST): UTC+02:00 (CEST)
- Postal code: 1022
- SFOS number: 5627
- ISO 3166 code: CH-VD
- Surrounded by: Écublens, Lausanne, Renens
- Website: www.chavannes.ch

Chavannes-près-Renens is a municipality in the Swiss canton of Vaud, located in the district of Ouest Lausannois.

== History ==
The eastern part of Chavannes-près-Renens was already inhabited during the time of the Romans. A bronze figurine, an axe, knives and several iron items have been found from that period. From the Middle Ages until the 18th century it was a rural town focused on agriculture.

Chavannes-près-Renens is first mentioned in 1224 as Chavanes. In another document from October 1272 the former bisschop of Lausanne Jean de Cossonay talks about the territory of Chavannes as well as its mills.

== Geography ==
Aerial view: Chavannes-près-Renens on the right (1960)

Chavannes-près-Renens has an area, as of 2009, of 1.7 square kilometers (0.66 mi^{2}). Of this area, 0.39 km^{2} (0.15 mi^{2}) or 23.6% is used for agricultural purposes, while 0.15 km^{2} (0.058 mi^{2}) or 9.1% is forested. Of the rest of the land, 1.08 km^{2} (0.42 mi^{2}) or 65.5% is settled (buildings or roads), 0.04 km^{2} (9.9 acres) or 2.4% is either rivers or lakes.

Of the built up area, industrial buildings made up 4.2% of the total area while housing and buildings made up 27.9% and transportation infrastructure made up 18.2%. while parks, green belts and sports fields made up 14.5%. Out of the forested land, 6.1% of the total land area is heavily forested and 3.0% is covered with orchards or small clusters of trees. Of the agricultural land, 10.3% is used for growing crops and 9.1% is pastures, while 4.2% is used for orchards or vine crops. All the water in the municipality is flowing water.

The municipality was part of the Morges District until it was dissolved on 31 August 2006, and Chavannes-près-Renens became part of the new district of Ouest Lausannois.

The municipality is located in the industrial region westward of Lausanne.

== Flag and coat of arms ==
The flag and coat of arms of the town consists of an arched bridge and a cherry branch on an argent (silver) and gules (red) background.

The flag and the coat of arms were adopted in 1905 but got their final forms in 1930. The bridge and the background colors represent the bridge in Lausanne under which the inhabitants of Chavannes had to walk in the Middle Ages. The cherries symbolize the importance of orchards for the town at the beginning of the 20th century. A special type of dark cherries, called "Noire de Chavannes" was cultivated during that time. The coat of arms shows red cherries instead of dark ones, probably for aesthetic reasons.

== Demographics ==
Chavannes-près-Renens has a population (as of December 2020) of 8,460. As of 2008, 50.7% of the population are resident foreign nationals. Over the last 10 years (1999–2009) the population has changed at a rate of 18.2%. It has changed at a rate of 7.4% due to migration and at a rate of 12% due to births and deaths.

Most of the population (as of 2000) speaks French (4,454 or 73.5%), with Italian being second most common (387 or 6.4%) and German being third (277 or 4.6%). There is 1 person who speaks Romansh.

Of the population in the municipality 861 or about 14.2% were born in Chavannes-près-Renens and lived there in 2000. There were 1,691 or 27.9% who were born in the same canton, while 977 or 16.1% were born somewhere else in Switzerland, and 2,369 or 39.1% were born outside of Switzerland.

In 2008 there were 37 live births to Swiss citizens and 54 births to non-Swiss citizens, and in same time span there were 24 deaths of Swiss citizens and 6 non-Swiss citizen deaths. Ignoring immigration and emigration, the population of Swiss citizens increased by 13 while the foreign population increased by 48. There were 9 Swiss men who emigrated from Switzerland and 10 Swiss women who immigrated back to Switzerland. At the same time, there were 96 non-Swiss men and 78 non-Swiss women who immigrated from another country to Switzerland. The total Swiss population change in 2008 (from all sources, including moves across municipal borders) was an increase of 101 and the non-Swiss population increased by 109 people. This represents a population growth rate of 3.3%.

The age distribution, as of 2009, in Chavannes-près-Renens is; 905 children or 13.7% of the population are between 0 and 9 years old and 748 teenagers or 11.3% are between 10 and 19. Of the adult population, 1,140 people or 17.3% of the population are between 20 and 29 years old. 1,151 people or 17.4% are between 30 and 39, 922 people or 14.0% are between 40 and 49, and 670 people or 10.2% are between 50 and 59. The senior population distribution is 580 people or 8.8% of the population are between 60 and 69 years old, 307 people or 4.7% are between 70 and 79, there are 155 people or 2.3% who are between 80 and 89, and there are 19 people or 0.3% who are 90 and older.

As of 2000, there were 2,729 people who were single and never married in the municipality. There were 2,778 married individuals, 207 widows or widowers and 349 individuals who are divorced.

As of 2000, there were 2,611 private households in the municipality, and an average of 2.2 persons per household. There were 932 households that consist of only one person and 131 households with five or more people. Out of a total of 2,671 households that answered this question, 34.9% were households made up of just one person and there were 9 adults who lived with their parents. Of the rest of the households, there are 658 married couples without children, 767 married couples with children. There were 152 single parents with a child or children. There were 93 households that were made up of unrelated people and 60 households that were made up of some sort of institution or another collective housing.

In 2000 there were 66 single family homes (or 25.8% of the total) out of a total of 256 inhabited buildings. There were 108 multi-family buildings (42.2%), along with 61 multi-purpose buildings that were mostly used for housing (23.8%) and 21 other use buildings (commercial or industrial) that also had some housing (8.2%). Of the single family homes 23 were built before 1919. The greatest number of single family homes (27) were built between 1919 and 1945. The most multi-family homes (26) were built before 1919 and the next most (23) were built between 1971 and 1980.

In 2000 there were 2,824 apartments in the municipality. The most common apartment size was 3 rooms of which there were 1,138. There were 228 single room apartments and 209 apartments with five or more rooms. Of these apartments, a total of 2,603 apartments (92.2% of the total) were permanently occupied, while 134 apartments (4.7%) were seasonally occupied and 87 apartments (3.1%) were empty. As of 2009, the construction rate of new housing units was 0.3 new units per 1000 residents. The vacancy rate for the municipality, in 2010, was 0.16%.

The historical population is given in the following chart:

== Heritage sites of national significance ==
The Cantonal Archives of Vaud in Chavannes-près-Renens is listed as a Swiss heritage site of national significance.

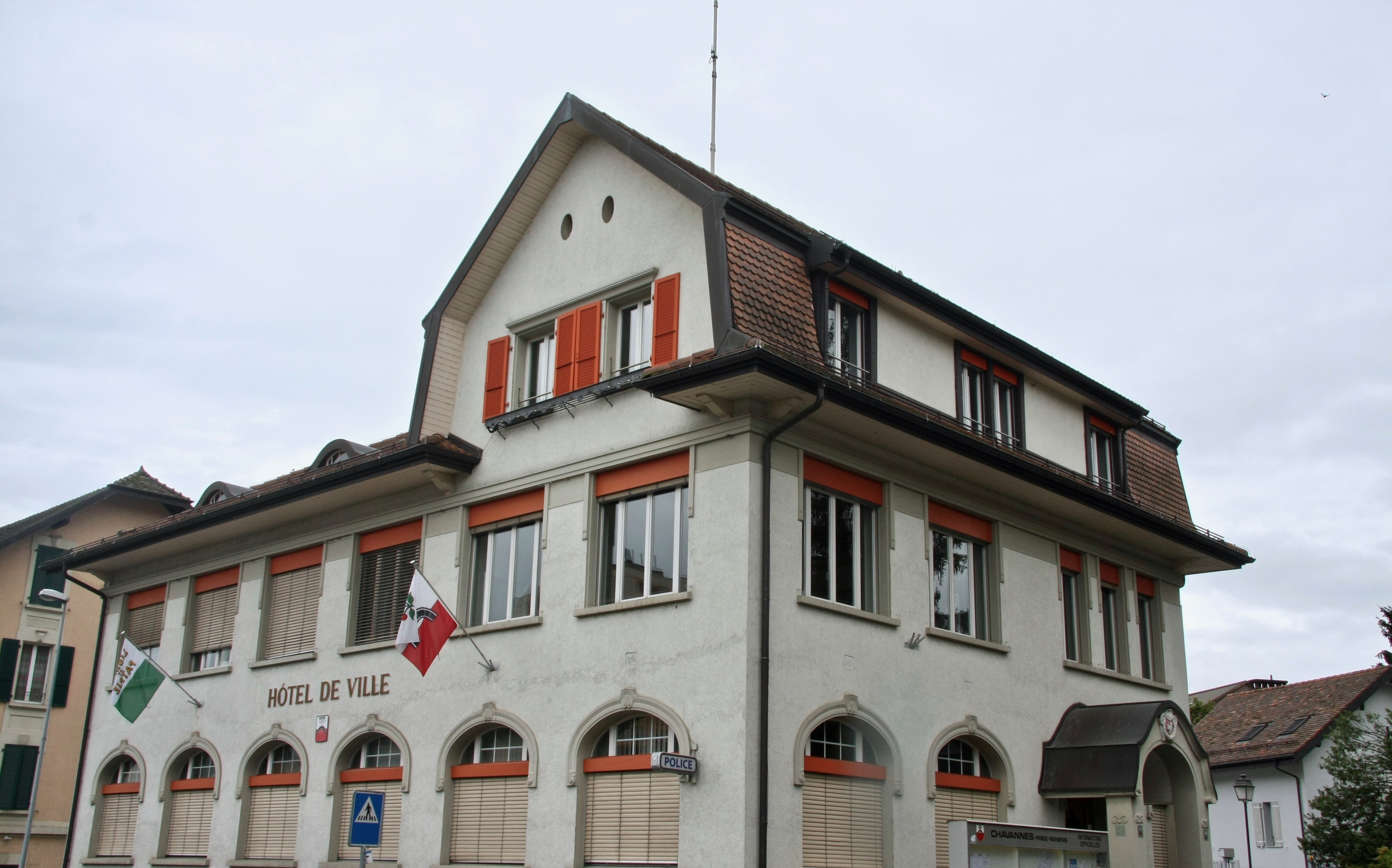
The town hall of Chavannes-près-Renens (2020)

== Politics ==
In the 2007 federal election the most popular party was the SP which received 31.36% of the vote. The next three most popular parties were the SVP (23.07%), the Green Party (13.31%) and the FDP (9.27%). In the federal election, a total of 924 votes were cast, and the voter turnout was 37.7%.

== Economy ==
As of 2010, Chavannes-près-Renens had an unemployment rate of 6.6%. As of 2008, there were 2 people employed in the primary economic sector and about 1 business involved in this sector. 151 people were employed in the secondary sector and there were 30 businesses in this sector. 2,684 people were employed in the tertiary sector, with 152 businesses in this sector. There were 3,080 residents of the municipality who were employed in some capacity, of which females made up 42.5% of the workforce.

In 2008 the total number of full-time equivalent jobs was 2,060. The number of jobs in the primary sector was 1, all of which were in agriculture. The number of jobs in the secondary sector was 142 of which 46 or (32.4%) were in manufacturing and 96 (67.6%) were in construction. The number of jobs in the tertiary sector was 1,917. In the tertiary sector; 373 or 19.5% were in wholesale or retail sales or the repair of motor vehicles, 14 or 0.7% were in the movement and storage of goods, 61 or 3.2% were in a hotel or restaurant, 9 or 0.5% were in the information industry, 2 or 0.1% were the insurance or financial industry, 94 or 4.9% were technical professionals or scientists, 878 or 45.8% were in education and 49 or 2.6% were in health care.

In 2000, there were 1,180 workers who commuted into the municipality and 2,659 workers who commuted away. The municipality is a net exporter of workers, with about 2.3 workers leaving the municipality for every one entering. About 1.4% of the workforce coming into Chavannes-près-Renens are coming from outside Switzerland. Of the working population, 31.5% used public transportation to get to work, and 49.5% used a private car.

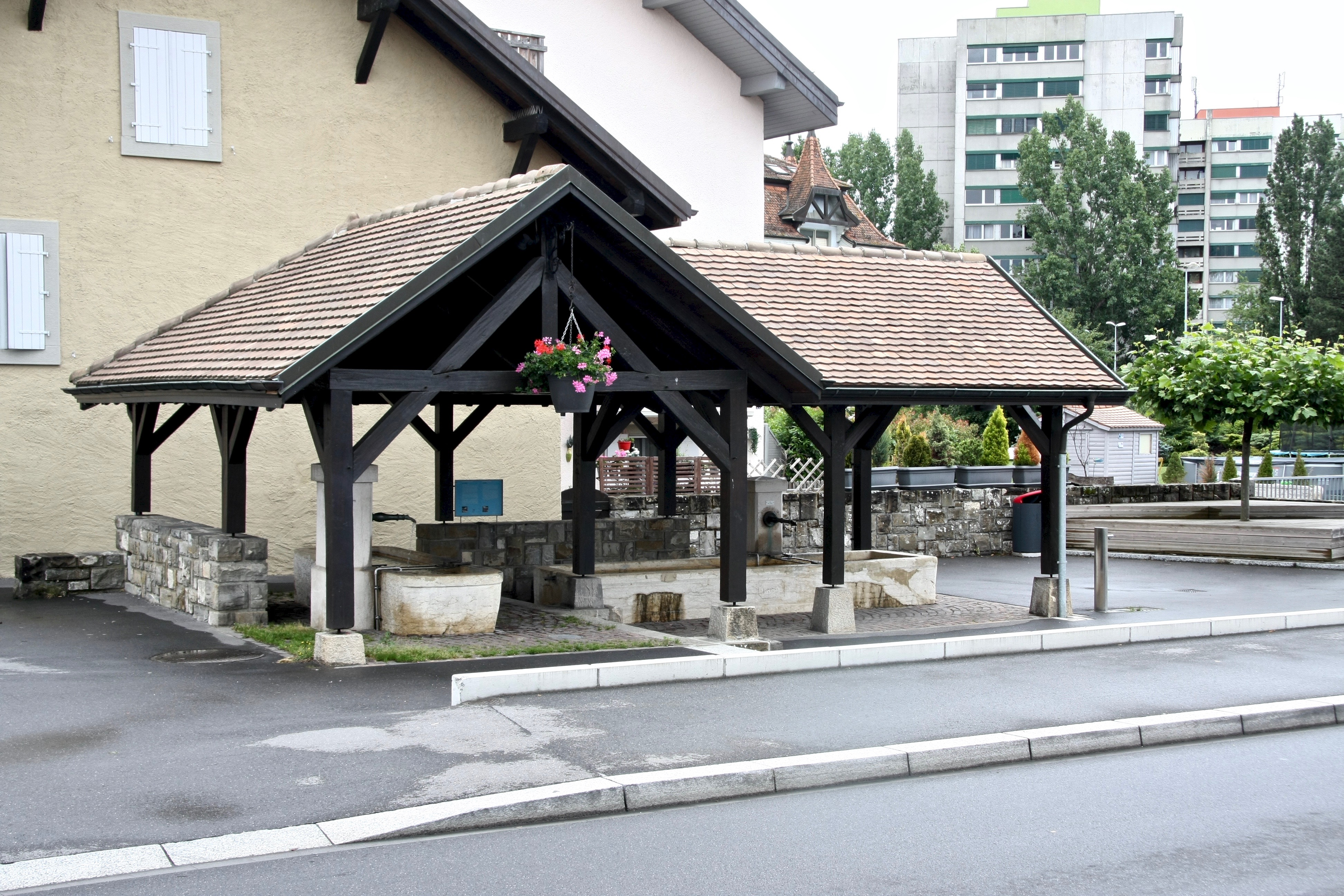
Historical water fountain

== Religion ==
From the 2000 census, 2,481 or 40.9% were Roman Catholic, while 1,440 or 23.8% belonged to the Swiss Reformed Church. Of the rest of the population, there were 166 members of an Orthodox church (or about 2.74% of the population), there were 5 individuals (or about 0.08% of the population) who belonged to the Christian Catholic Church, and there were 262 individuals (or about 4.32% of the population) who belonged to another Christian church. There were 9 individuals (or about 0.15% of the population) who were Jewish, and 576 (or about 9.50% of the population) who were Islamic. There were 26 individuals who were Buddhist, 37 individuals who were Hindu and 9 individuals who belonged to another church. 834 (or about 13.76% of the population) belonged to no church, are agnostic or atheist, and 345 individuals (or about 5.69% of the population) did not answer the question.

== Education ==
In Chavannes-près-Renens about 2,017 or (33.3%) of the population have completed non-mandatory upper secondary education, and 730 or (12.0%) have completed additional higher education (either university or a Fachhochschule). Of the 730 who completed tertiary schooling, 31.1% were Swiss men, 20.8% were Swiss women, 29.6% were non-Swiss men and 18.5% were non-Swiss women.

In the 2009/2010 school year there were a total of 876 students in the Chavannes-près-Renens school district. In the Vaud cantonal school system, two years of non-obligatory pre-school are provided by the political districts. During the school year, the political district provided pre-school care for a total of 803 children of which 502 children (62.5%) received subsidized pre-school care. The canton's primary school program requires students to attend for four years. There were 513 students in the municipal primary school program. The obligatory lower secondary school program lasts for six years and there were 345 students in those schools. There were also 18 students who were home schooled or attended another non-traditional school.

As of 2000, there were 540 students in Chavannes-près-Renens who came from another municipality, while 575 residents attended schools outside the municipality.

== Famous people linked to the municipality ==
- Roger Federer - Swiss professional tennis player born in 1981 - attended secondary school at the Collège de la Planta (1995–1997) as part of a two-year sports-study program organized by Swiss Tennis
- Sergei Aschwanden - Swiss professional judoka born in 1975 - also attended the Collège de la Planta in his teens.
