= Ouest Lausannois District =

Coordinates: 46°32′19″N 6°35′03″E

Ouest Lausannois District District de l'Ouest lausannois
- District
- Country: Switzerland
- Canton: Vaud
- Capital: Renens

Area
  - Total: 26.35 km^{2} (10.17 sq mi)

Population (2020)
  - Total: 79,015
  - Density: 2,999/km^{2} (7,767/sq mi)
- Time zone: UTC+1 (CET)
  - Summer (DST): UTC+2 (CEST)
- Municipalities: 8

Ouest Lausannois District is a district in the canton of Vaud, Switzerland. The seat of the district is Renens.

== Geography ==
Ouest Lausannois has an area, as of 2009, of 26.35 square kilometers (10.17 sq mi). Of this area, 6.45 km^{2} (2.49 sq mi) or 24.5% is used for agricultural purposes, while 3.59 km^{2} (1.39 sq mi) or 13.6% is forested. Of the rest of the land, 16.07 km^{2} (6.20 sq mi) or 61.0% is settled (buildings or roads) and 0.15 km^{2} (37 acres) or 0.6% is unproductive land.

== Demographics ==
Ouest Lausannois has a population (as of December 2020) of 79,015.

In 2008 there were 397 live births to Swiss citizens and 430 births to non-Swiss citizens, and in same time span there were 362 deaths of Swiss citizens and 75 non-Swiss citizen deaths. Ignoring immigration and emigration, the population of Swiss citizens increased by 35 while the foreign population increased by 355. There were 19 Swiss men who emigrated from Switzerland. At the same time, there were 861 non-Swiss men and 806 non-Swiss women who immigrated from another country to Switzerland. The total Swiss population change in 2008 (from all sources, including moves across municipal borders) was an increase of 765 and the non-Swiss population increased by 876 people. This represents a population growth rate of 2.6%.

The age distribution, as of 2009, in Ouest Lausannois is; 7,417 children or 11.2% of the population are between 0 and 9 years old and 7,415 teenagers or 11.2% are between 10 and 19. Of the adult population, 9,859 people or 14.8% of the population are between 20 and 29 years old. 10,461 people or 15.7% are between 30 and 39, 10,192 people or 15.3% are between 40 and 49, and 7,999 people or 12.0% are between 50 and 59. The senior population distribution is 6,589 people or 9.9% of the population are between 60 and 69 years old, 4,015 people or 6.0% are between 70 and 79, there are 2,165 people or 3.3% who are 80 and 89, and there are 387 people or 0.6% who are 90 and older.

== Mergers and name changes ==
On 1 September 2006 the former Lausanne district (District de Lausanne) and Morges district (District de Morges) were dissolved and portions of the old districts were merged into the new Ouest lausannois district.

- The municipalities of Crissier, Prilly and Renens (VD) came from the Lausanne district (District de Lausanne).
- The municipalities of Bussigny-près-Lausanne, Chavannes-près-Renens, Écublens (VD), Saint-Sulpice (VD) and Villars-Sainte-Croix came from the Morges district (District de Morges).

== Politics ==
In the 2007 federal election the most popular party was the SP which received 24.07% of the vote. The next three most popular parties were the SVP (22.79%), the Green Party (13.64%) and the FDP (13.31%). In the federal election, a total of 12,329 votes were cast, and the voter turnout was 41.5%.

== Education ==
In the 2009/2010 school year there were a total of 7,940 students in the local and district school systems. In the Vaud cantonal school system, two years of non-obligatory pre-school are provided by the political districts. During the school year, the district provided pre-school care for a total of 803 children. There were 502 (62.5%) children who received subsidized pre-school care. There were 4,339 students in the primary school program, which last four years. The obligatory lower secondary school program lasts for six years and there were 3,341 students in those schools. There were also 260 students who were home schooled or attended another non-traditional school.

== Municipalities ==
The following municipalities are located within the district:

Municipality	Population (31 December 2020)	Area km^{2}
Bussigny-près-Lausanne	9,603	4.82
Chavannes-près-Renens	8,460	1.65
Crissier	8,727	5.51
Écublens	13,157	5.71
Prilly	12,360	2.19
Renens	20,834	2.96
Saint-Sulpice	4,914	1.86
Villars-Sainte-Croix	960	1.65
Total	79,015	26.35
