= Bigambo Rochat =

Swiss footballer (born 1991)

Personal information
- Date of birth: 29 May 1991 (age 35)
- Place of birth: Renens, Switzerland
- Height: 1.75 m (5 ft 9 in)
- Positions: Right-back; defensive midfielder

Team information
- Current team: Yverdon-Sport
- Number: 8

Youth career
- 2000–2002: FC Renens
- 2002–2004: FC Crissier
- 2004–2008: Lausanne-Sport
- 2008–2009: Lille

Senior career*
Years	Team	Apps	(Gls)
2007–2008	Lausanne-Sport	2	(0)
2009–2010	Sion	4	(0)
2010–2011	Lausanne-Sport	12	(0)
2011–2012	Neuchâtel Xamax	1	(0)
2012–	Yverdon-Sport	6	(1)

International career^{‡}
2007–2008	Switzerland U17	10	(0)
2009–2010	Switzerland U19	9	(0)
- * Club domestic league appearances and goals as of 6 May 2013 ‡ National team caps and goals as of 21 March 2007

Bigambo Rochat (born 29 May 1991) is a Swiss footballer who currently plays for Yverdon-Sport FC.

== Career ==
Rochat began his career with FC Renens after which he moved to FC Crissier in March 2002. His stay in Crissier lasted just twenty three months before was scouted from Lausanne-Sport, making the move in February 2004. At Lausanne he played two games with the first team in the Challenge League and was also a member of Team Vaud, the academy team. Then on 23 September 2008 he moved to top French club Lille.

On 9 April 2009 the 18-year-old defender left Lille to sign a five-year deal with Sion until 2014. However, his stay would last less than two years as he returned to his former club Lausanne-Sport, joining them 25 September 2010, though he was released at the end of the season.

In July 2011, Bigambo Rochat signed a contract for Swiss team Neuchâtel Xamax. At the end of the season, he moved on to Yverdon-Sport FC in July 2012 following Xamax's financial troubles and relegation to the fifth tier.

== International ==
Rochat has represented Switzerland at various youth levels including. He featured for the Swiss under-17 team at the 2008 UEFA European Under-17 Football Championship in Turkey.
