= Saint-Sulpice, Vaud =

Saint-Sulpice
- Municipality
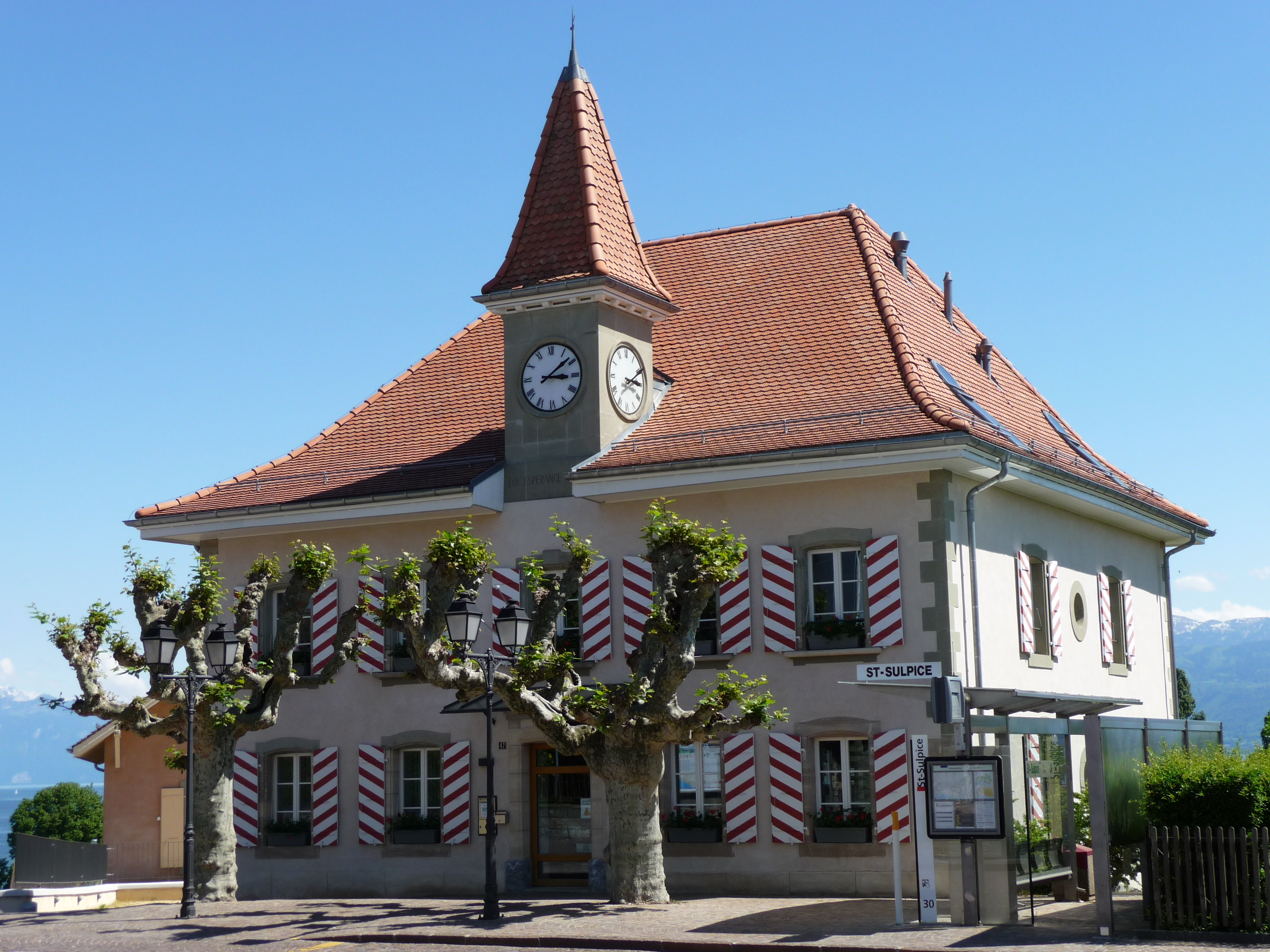
- Saint-Sulpice

- Flag Coat of arms
- Location of Saint-Sulpice
- Location within Switzerland Location within Canton of Vaud
- Coordinates: 46°31′N 6°34′E
- Country: Switzerland
- Canton: Vaud
- District: Ouest Lausannois

Government
  - Mayor: Syndic; Etienne Dubuis

Area
  - Total: 1.9 km^{2} (0.73 sq mi)
- Elevation: 394 m (1,293 ft)

Population (2025)
  - Total: 5,193
  - Density: 2,700/km^{2} (7,100/sq mi)
- Time zone: UTC+01:00 (CET)
  - Summer (DST): UTC+02:00 (CEST)
- Postal code: 1025
- SFOS number: 5648
- ISO 3166 code: CH-VD
- Surrounded by: Denges, Écublens, Évian-les-Bains (FR-74), Lausanne, Préverenges, Publier (FR-74)
- Website: www.st-sulpice.ch

Saint-Sulpice is a municipality in Switzerland in the canton of Vaud, located in the district of Ouest Lausannois. It is a suburb of the city of Lausanne.

== History ==
Saint-Sulpice is first mentioned in 1228 as Sanctus Surpiscius.

== Geography ==
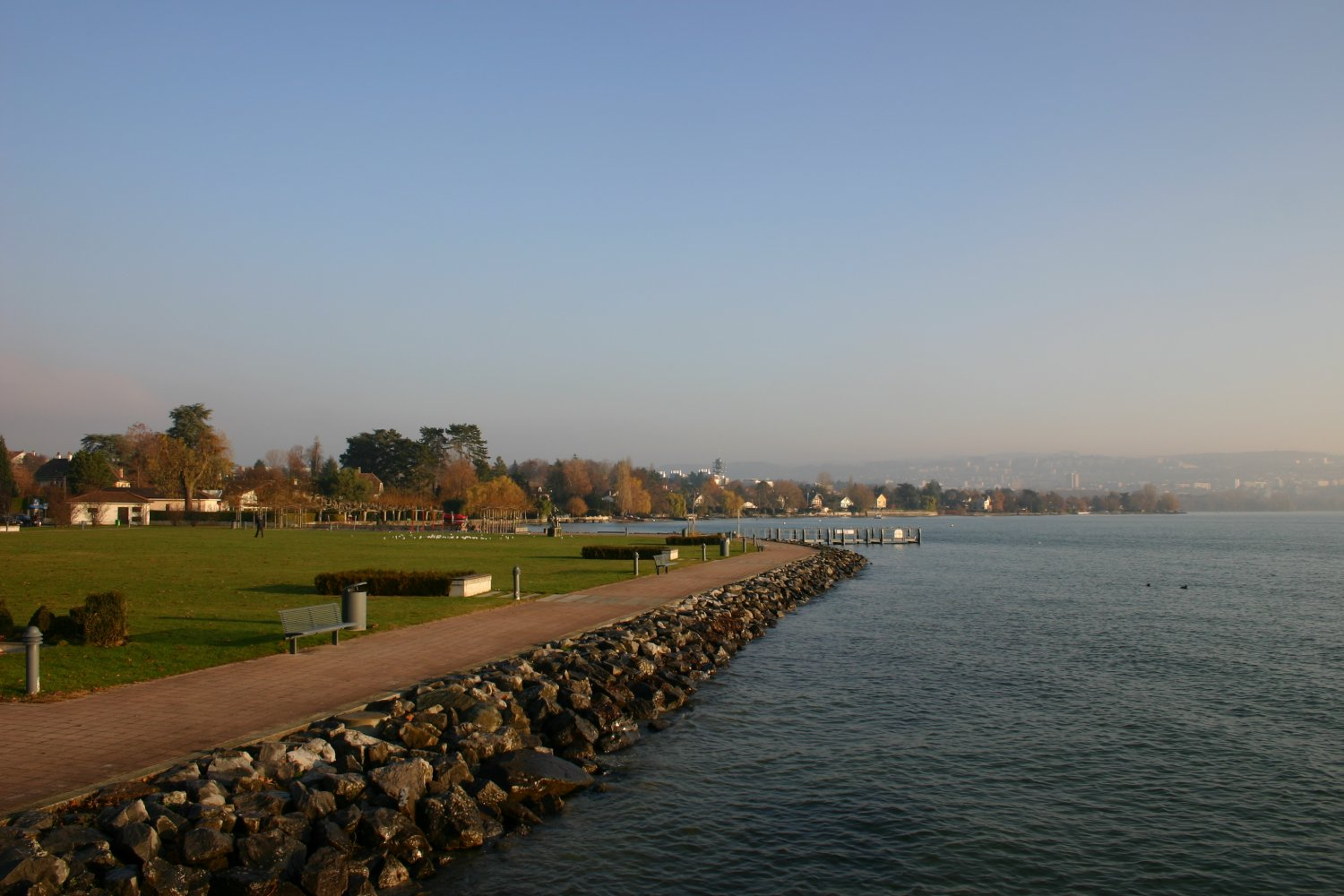
Shore of Lake Geneva

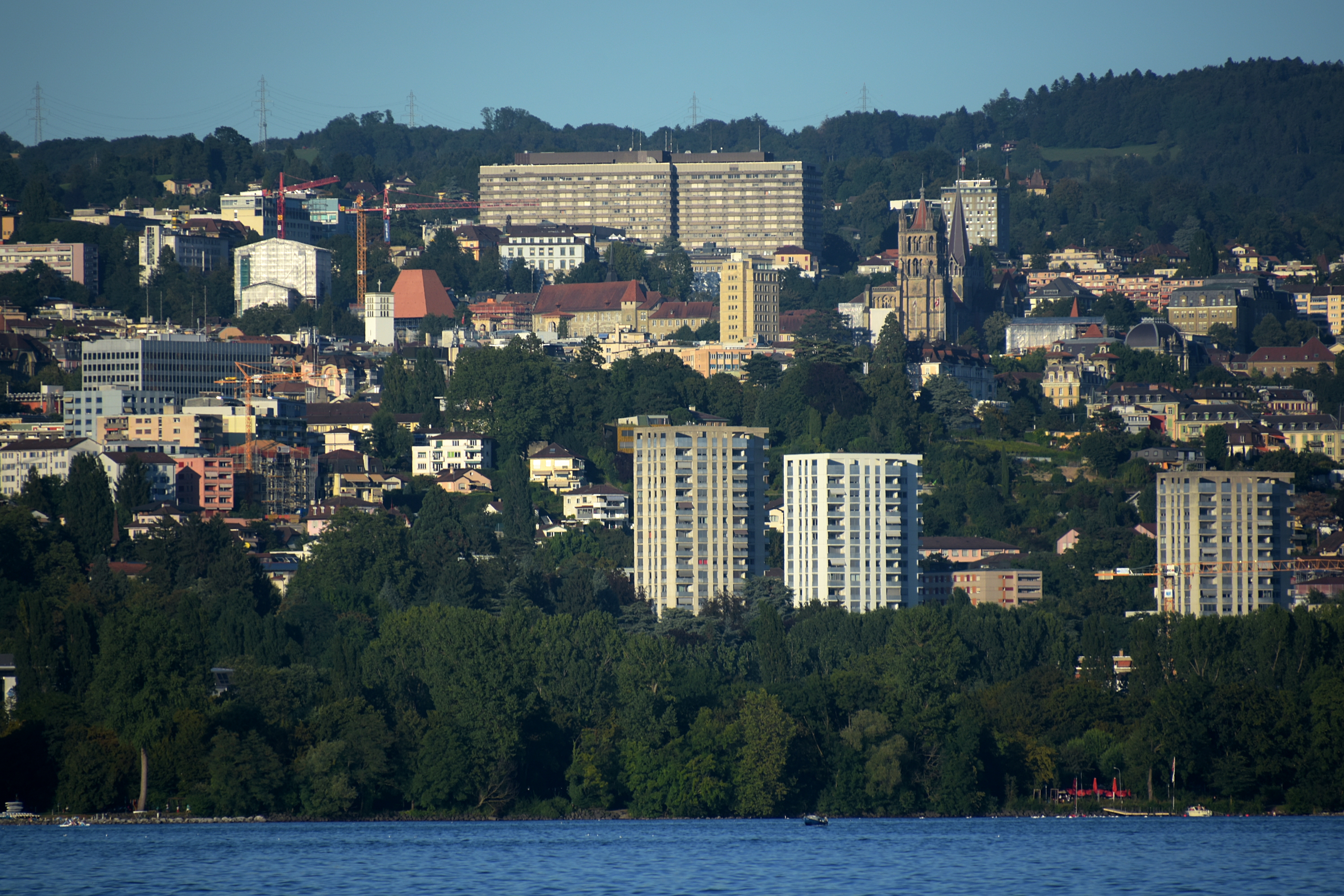
View of Lausanne from Lake Geneva shore in St-Sulpice

Saint-Sulpice has an area, as of 2009, of 1.9 square kilometers (0.73 mi^{2}). Of this area, 0.28 km^{2} (0.11 mi^{2}) or 15.1% is used for agricultural purposes, while 0.13 km^{2} (0.050 mi^{2}) or 7.0% is forested. Of the rest of the land, 1.41 km^{2} (0.54 mi^{2}) or 75.8% is settled (buildings or roads).

Of the built up area, industrial buildings made up 6.5% of the total area while housing and buildings made up 41.9% and transportation infrastructure made up 11.8%. Power and water infrastructure as well as other special developed areas made up 3.2% of the area while parks, green belts and sports fields made up 12.4%. Out of the forested land, 5.4% of the total land area is heavily forested and 1.6% is covered with orchards or small clusters of trees. Of the agricultural land, 13.4% is used for growing crops and 1.1% is pastures.

The municipality was part of the Morges District until it was dissolved on 31 August 2006, and Saint-Sulpice became part of the new district of Ouest Lausannois.

The municipality is located along Lake Geneva between the Venoge and Chamberonne river. It consists of the village of Saint-Sulpice, the residential development of Les Pierrettes and the industrial zone of En Champagny.

== Coat of arms ==
The blazon of the municipal coat of arms is Gules, Chief Argent, overall a Church Argent lined Sable.

== Demographics ==
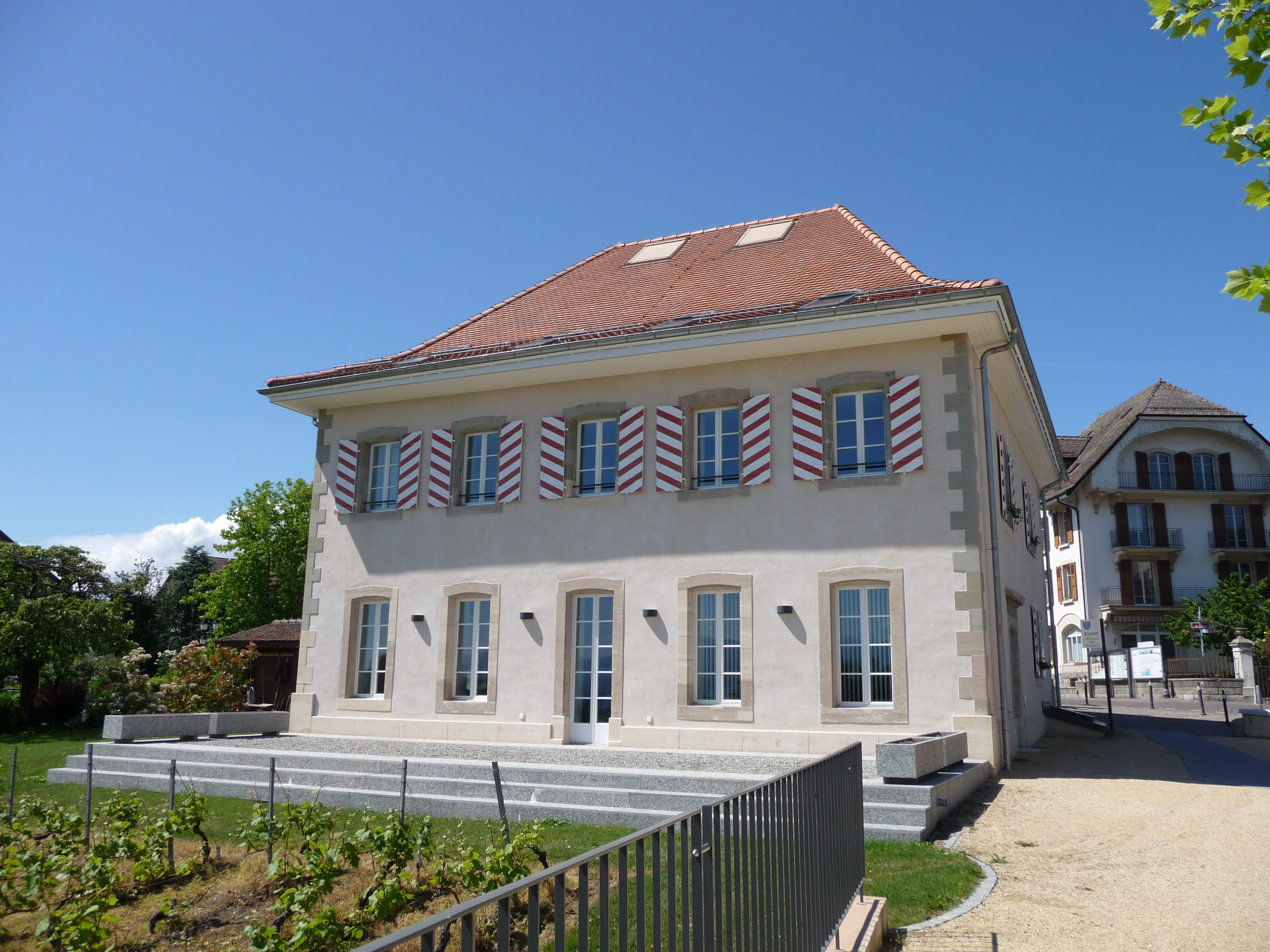
Police station in Saint-Sulpice

Saint-Sulpice has a population of 5,193 (as of December 2025). 45.7% of the population are foreign nationals. Since the beginning of the new millennium, the population has grown at an average annual rate of 2.34% (2000-2025).

At the 2000 census, most of the population spoke French (2,377 or 81.6%), with German second most common (231 or 7.9%) and English third (81 or 2.8%). There were 58 Italian speakers. Of the population in the municipality 377 or about 12.9% were born in Saint-Sulpice and lived there in 2000. There were 1,015 or 34.8% who were born in the same canton, while 610 or 20.9% were born somewhere else in Switzerland, and 849 or 29.1% were born outside of Switzerland.

In 2024, the age distribution was: 21.9% aged between 0 and 19; 61.4% aged 20–64; and 16.8% aged 65 or over. In 2023, the municipality had 2,307 households, including 549 with children under 18; the average household size was 2.1 persons.

The historical population is given in the following chart:

== Heritage sites of national significance ==
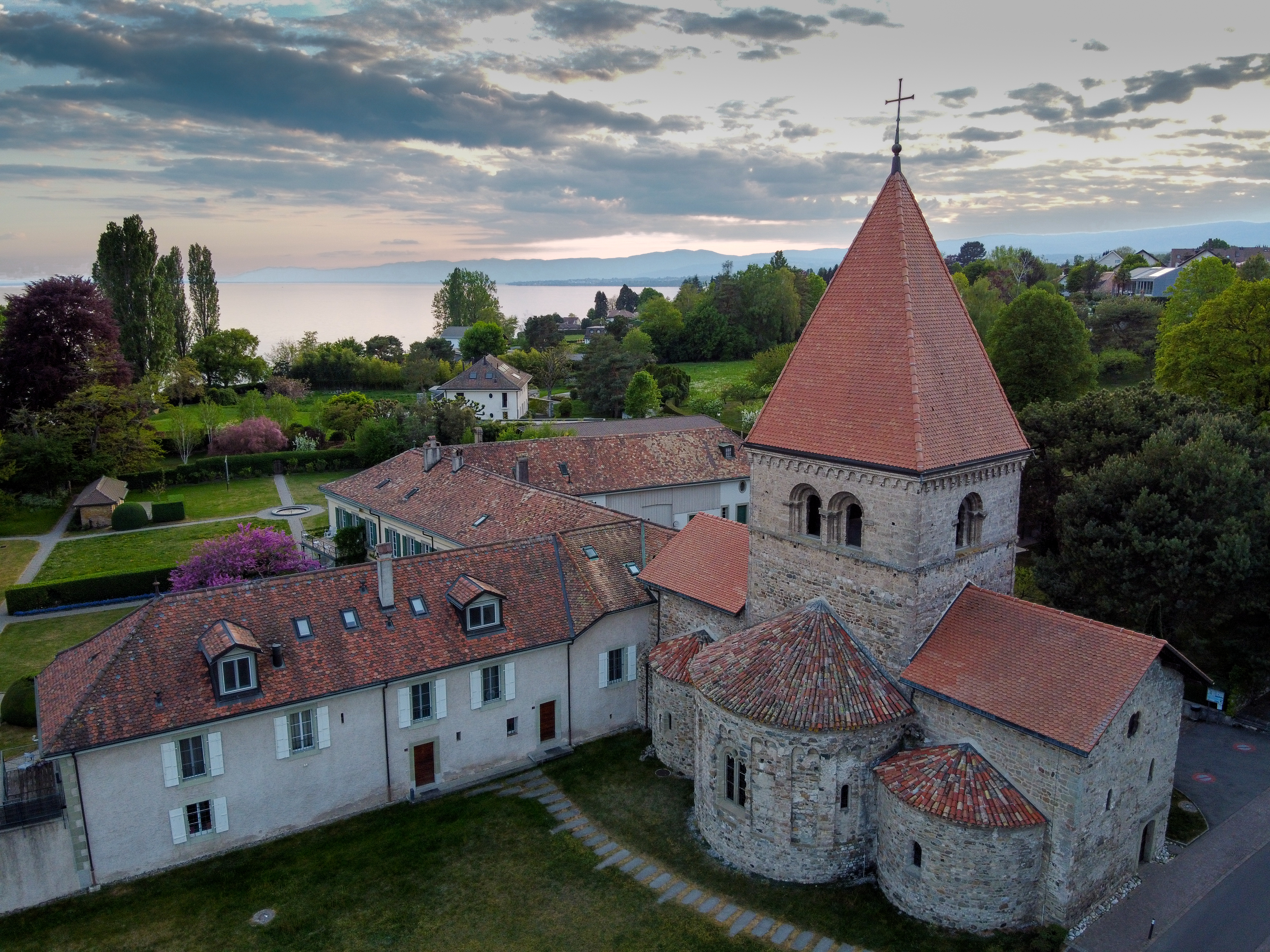
Temple of Saint-Sulpice, old church Sainte-Marie-Madeleine, from above

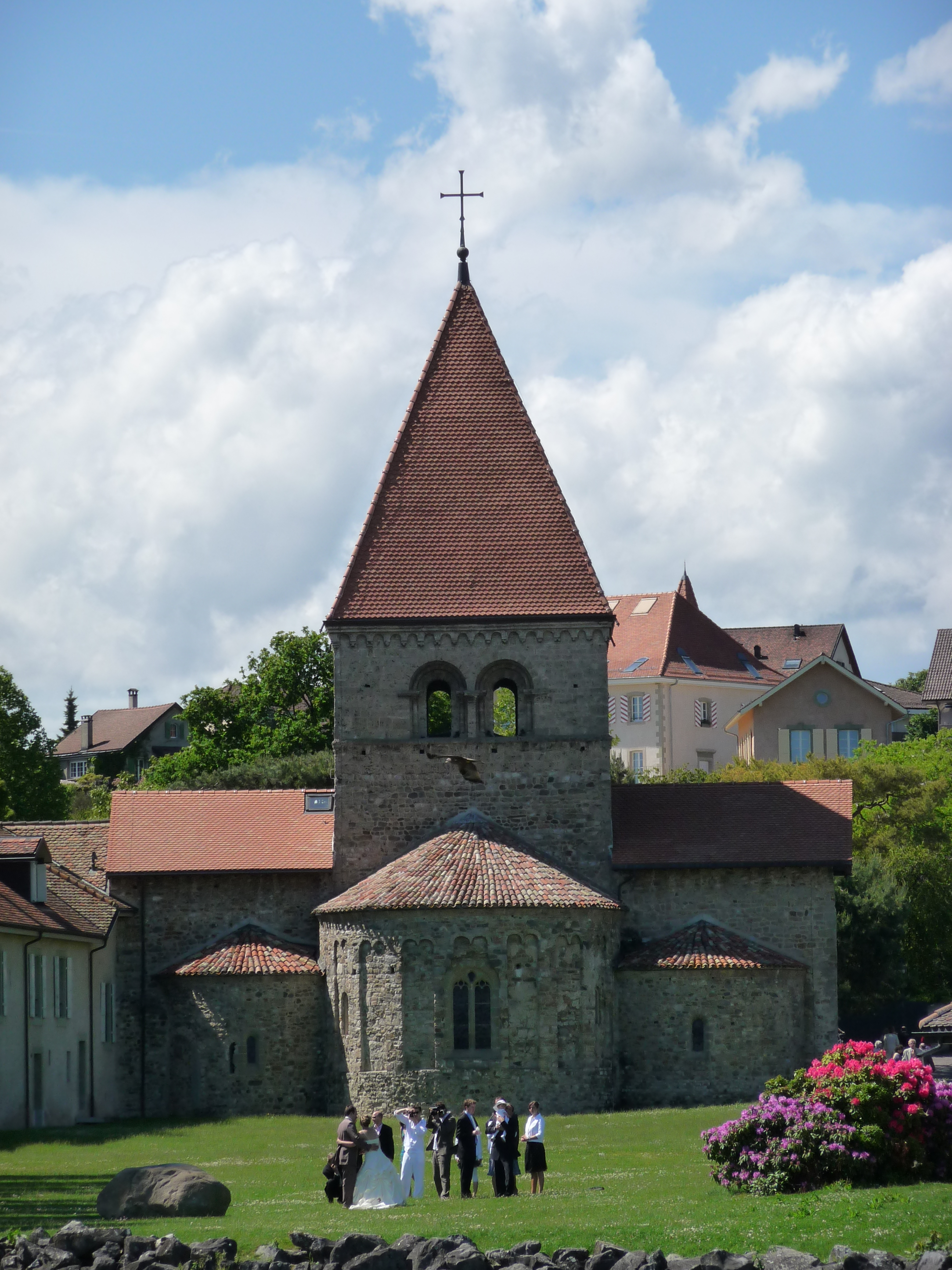
Swiss Reformed Church of Sainte-Marie-Madeleine (Mary Magdalene) and Priory.

The Swiss Reformed Church of Sainte-Marie-Madeleine (Mary Magdalene) and Priory is listed as a Swiss heritage site of national significance (see the article about the Church in French).

The roof of the church was reconstructed after an arson on the morning of Thursday 19 July 2001.

== Politics ==
In the 2007 federal election the most popular party was the SVP which received 27.57% of the vote. The next three most popular parties were the FDP (16.05%), the SP (15.08%) and the Green Party (11.75%). In the federal election, a total of 987 votes were cast, and the voter turnout was 52.3%.

== Economy ==
As of 2010, Saint-Sulpice had an unemployment rate of 3.8%. As of 2008, there were 2 people employed in the primary economic sector and about 2 businesses involved in this sector. 306 people were employed in the secondary sector and there were 27 businesses in this sector. 894 people were employed in the tertiary sector, with 151 businesses in this sector. There were 1,528 residents of the municipality who were employed in some capacity, of which females made up 42.3% of the workforce.

In 2008 the total number of full-time equivalent jobs was 1,046. The number of jobs in the primary sector was 1, of which were in agriculture and 1 was in fishing or fisheries. The number of jobs in the secondary sector was 290 of which 81 or (27.9%) were in manufacturing and 178 (61.4%) were in construction. The number of jobs in the tertiary sector was 755. In the tertiary sector; 269 or 35.6% were in wholesale or retail sales or the repair of motor vehicles, 15 or 2.0% were in the movement and storage of goods, 46 or 6.1% were in a hotel or restaurant, 88 or 11.7% were in the information industry, 20 or 2.6% were the insurance or financial industry, 93 or 12.3% were technical professionals or scientists, 12 or 1.6% were in education and 40 or 5.3% were in health care.

In 2000, there were 1,163 workers who commuted into the municipality and 1,250 workers who commuted away. The municipality is a net exporter of workers, with about 1.1 workers leaving the municipality for every one entering. About 2.7% of the workforce coming into Saint-Sulpice are coming from outside Switzerland. Of the working population, 15.3% used public transportation to get to work, and 66.8% used a private car.

== Religion ==
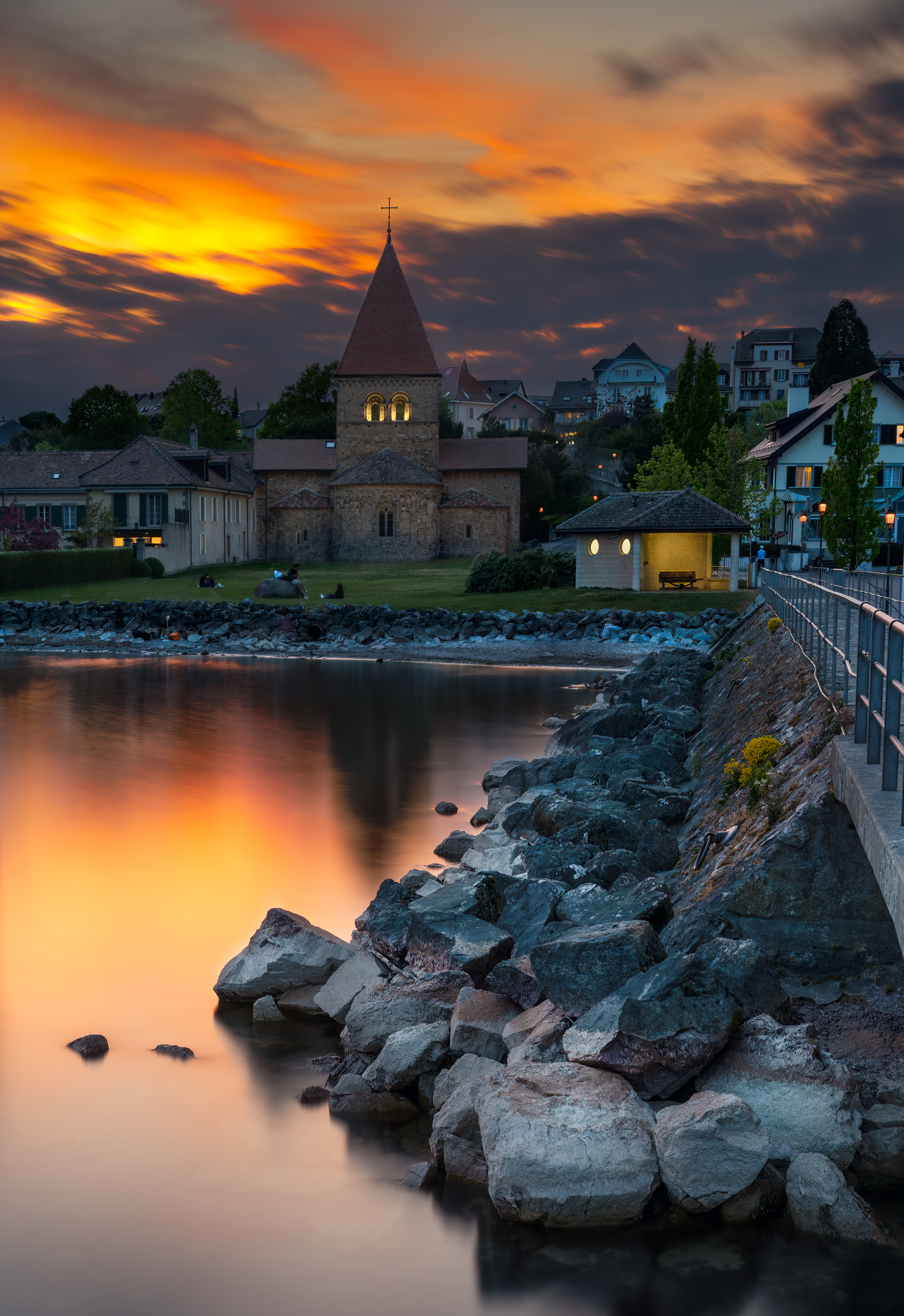
Romanesque church of Sainte-Marie-Madeleine from the 12th century

From the 2000 census, 991 or 34.0% were Roman Catholic, while 1,175 or 40.3% belonged to the Swiss Reformed Church. Of the rest of the population, there were 46 members of an Orthodox church (or about 1.58% of the population), there were 6 individuals (or about 0.21% of the population) who belonged to the Christian Catholic Church, and there were 81 individuals (or about 2.78% of the population) who belonged to another Christian church. There were 30 individuals (or about 1.03% of the population) who were Jewish, and 42 (or about 1.44% of the population) who were Islamic. There were 8 individuals who were Buddhist, 3 individuals who were Hindu and 9 individuals who belonged to another church. 456 (or about 15.65% of the population) belonged to no church, are agnostic or atheist, and 103 individuals (or about 3.53% of the population) did not answer the question.

== Education ==
In Saint-Sulpice about 1,005 or (34.5%) of the population have completed non-mandatory upper secondary education, and 913 or (31.3%) have completed additional higher education (either university or a Fachhochschule). Of the 913 who completed tertiary schooling, 46.5% were Swiss men, 25.1% were Swiss women, 17.5% were non-Swiss men and 10.8% were non-Swiss women.

In the 2009/2010 school year there were a total of 226 students in the Saint-Sulpice (VD) school district. In the Vaud cantonal school system, two years of non-obligatory pre-school are provided by the political districts. During the school year, the political district provided pre-school care for a total of 803 children of which 502 children (62.5%) received subsidized pre-school care. The canton's primary school program requires students to attend for four years. There were 138 students in the municipal primary school program. The obligatory lower secondary school program lasts for six years and there were 87 students in those schools. There were also 1 students who were home schooled or attended another non-traditional school.

As of 2000, there were 24 students in Saint-Sulpice who came from another municipality, while 328 residents attended schools outside the municipality.

Adjacent to the municipality are the main campuses of École Polytechnique Fédérale de Lausanne and University of Lausanne. Joint sports facilities and several student residences are located inside the St-Sulpice municipality.

== Notable people ==
Among the known artists is Walter Weibel (1924-2006), whose sculptures prominently mark many public places in St-Sulpice, including Le Pélican (1976) on the Pelican Park, and Le Cri du Poète (1972) in the port.
