= Crissier =

- Municipality
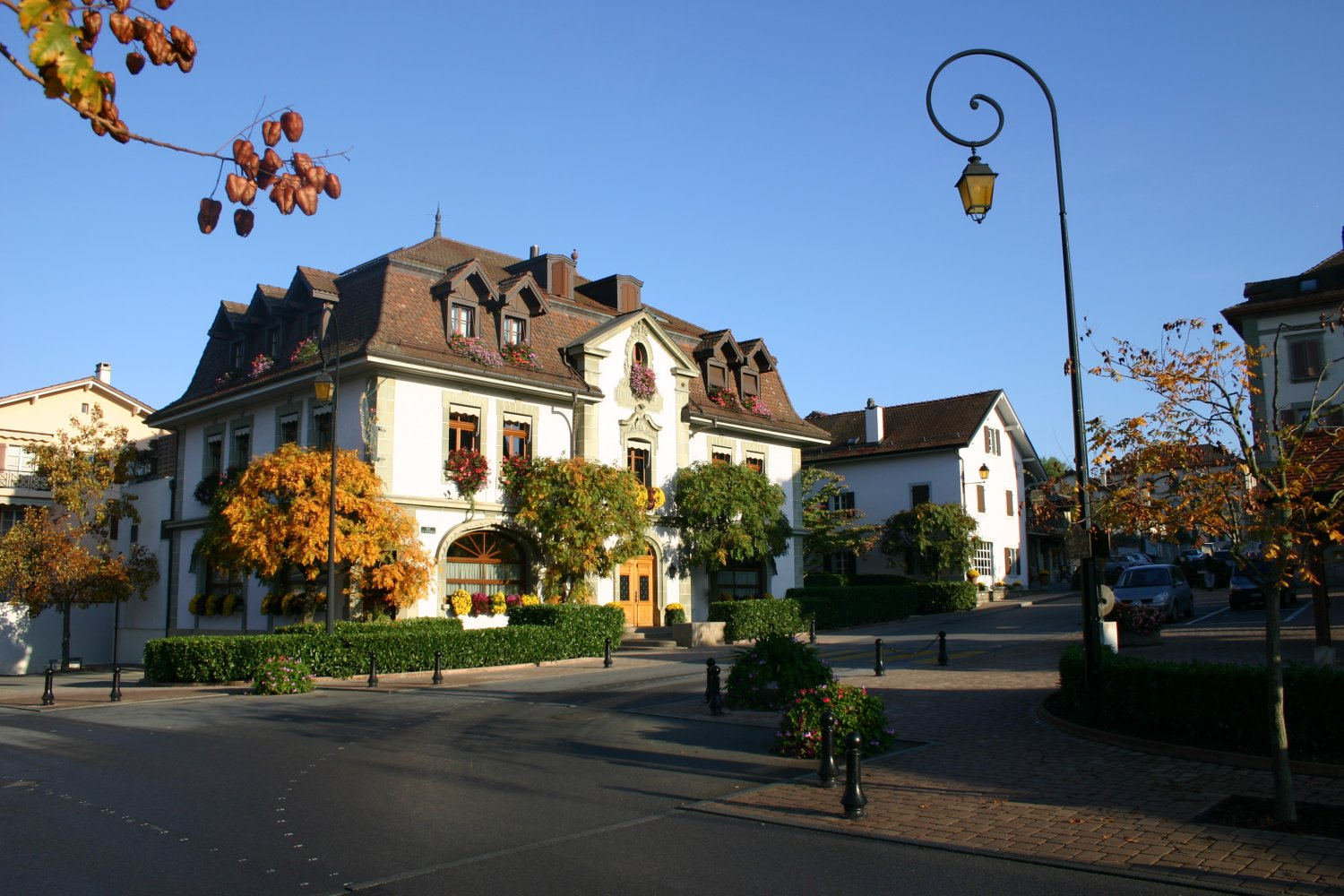
- Restaurant de l'hôtel de Ville

- Flag Coat of arms
- Location of Crissier
- Location within Switzerland Location within Canton of Vaud
- Coordinates: 46°33′N 06°35′E
- Country: Switzerland
- Canton: Vaud
- District: Ouest Lausannois

Government
  - Mayor: Syndic; Laurent Bovay Centre droite Crissier

Area
  - Total: 5.51 km^{2} (2.13 sq mi)
- Elevation: 467 m (1,532 ft)

Population (2003)
  - Total: 8 727 (31 décembre 2,020)
  - Density: 1.5/km^{2} (3.8/sq mi)
- Time zone: UTC+01:00 (CET)
  - Summer (DST): UTC+02:00 (CEST)
- Postal code: 1023
- SFOS number: 5583
- ISO 3166 code: CH-VD
- Surrounded by: Bussigny-près-Lausanne, Cheseaux-sur-Lausanne, Écublens, Jouxtens-Mézery, Lausanne, Mex, Renens, Sullens, Villars-Sainte-Croix
- Website: www.crissier.ch

Crissier (French pronunciation: [kʁisje]) is a municipality in the district of Ouest Lausannois in the canton of Vaud in Switzerland.

It is a suburb of Lausanne.

== History ==
Crissier is first mentioned in 1199 as Crissiaco. In 1228 it was mentioned as Crissie.

== Geography ==
Crissier has an area, as of 2009, of 5.51 km^{2} (2.13 mi^{2}) . Of this area, 1.39 km^{2} (0.54 mi^{2}) or 25.2% is used for agricultural purposes, while 1.46 km^{2} (0.56 mi^{2}) or 26.5% is forested. Of the rest of the land, 2.66 km^{2} (1.03 mi^{2}) or 48.3% is settled (buildings or roads), 0.01 km^{2} (2.5 acres) or 0.2% is either rivers or lakes.

Of the built up area, industrial buildings made up 14.0% of the total area while housing and buildings made up 15.2% and transportation infrastructure made up 16.3%. while parks, green belts and sports fields made up 2.0%. Out of the forested land, all of the forested land area is covered with heavy forests. Of the agricultural land, 18.9% is used for growing crops and 2.7% is pastures, while 3.6% is used for orchards or vine crops. All the water in the municipality is flowing water.

The municipality was part of the Lausanne District until it was dissolved on 31 August 2006, and Crissier became part of the new district of Ouest Lausannois.

The municipality is located west of Lausanne in the agglomeration of Lausanne.

== Coat of arms ==
The blazon of the municipal coat of arms is Per pale Argent and Gules, overall two crossed Rifles saltirewise Sable lined of the first.

== Demographics ==
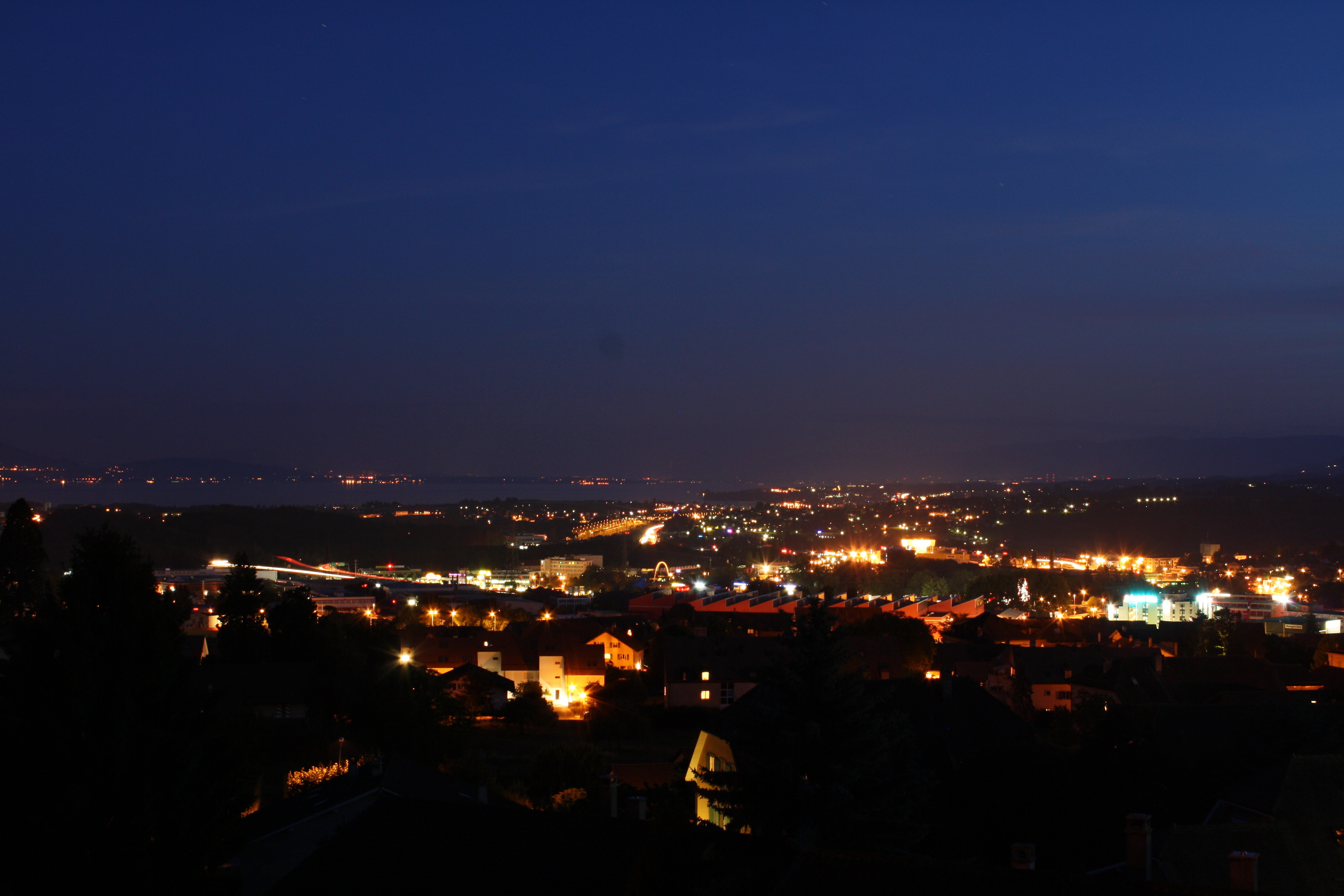
Crissier at night

Crissier has a population (as of December 2020) of 8,727. As of 2008, 42.9% of the population are resident foreign nationals. Over the last 10 years (1999–2009) the population has changed at a rate of 13%. It has changed at a rate of 4.8% due to migration and at a rate of 9.4% due to births and deaths.

Most of the population (as of 2000) speaks French (4,996 or 76.0%), with Italian being second most common (355 or 5.4%) and Portuguese being third (330 or 5.0%). There are 252 people who speak German and 7 people who speak Romansh.

Of the population in the municipality 996 or about 15.1% were born in Crissier and lived there in 2000. There were 2,075 or 31.5% who were born in the same canton, while 933 or 14.2% were born somewhere else in Switzerland, and 2,304 or 35.0% were born outside of Switzerland.

In 2008 there were 51 live births to Swiss citizens and 49 births to non-Swiss citizens, and in same time span there were 30 deaths of Swiss citizens and 5 non-Swiss citizen deaths. Ignoring immigration and emigration, the population of Swiss citizens increased by 21 while the foreign population increased by 44. There were 8 Swiss men and 1 Swiss woman who emigrated from Switzerland. At the same time, there were 81 non-Swiss men and 88 non-Swiss women who immigrated from another country to Switzerland. The total Swiss population change in 2008 (from all sources, including moves across municipal borders) was an increase of 62 and the non-Swiss population increased by 89 people. This represents a population growth rate of 2.2%.

The age distribution, as of 2009, in Crissier is; 842 children or 12.1% of the population are between 0 and 9 years old and 942 teenagers or 13.6% are between 10 and 19. Of the adult population, 916 people or 13.2% of the population are between 20 and 29 years old. 1,034 people or 14.9% are between 30 and 39, 1,202 people or 17.3% are between 40 and 49, and 878 people or 12.7% are between 50 and 59. The senior population distribution is 621 people or 9.0% of the population are between 60 and 69 years old, 318 people or 4.6% are between 70 and 79, there are 147 people or 2.1% who are between 80 and 89, and there are 31 people or 0.4% who are 90 and older.

As of 2000, there were 2,835 people who were single and never married in the municipality. There were 3,197 married individuals, 232 widows or widowers and 313 individuals who are divorced.

As of 2000, there were 2,574 private households in the municipality, and an average of 2.4 persons per household. There were 752 households that consist of only one person and 159 households with five or more people. Out of a total of 2,637 households that answered this question, 28.5% were households made up of just one person and there were 18 adults who lived with their parents. Of the rest of the households, there are 654 married couples without children, 944 married couples with children. There were 155 single parents with a child or children. There were 51 households that were made up of unrelated people and 63 households that were made up of some sort of institution or another collective housing.

In 2000 there were 506 single family homes (or 54.3% of the total) out of a total of 932 inhabited buildings. There were 276 multi-family buildings (29.6%), along with 93 multi-purpose buildings that were mostly used for housing (10.0%) and 57 other use buildings (commercial or industrial) that also had some housing (6.1%). Of the single family homes 29 were built before 1919, while 67 were built between 1990 and 2000. The greatest number of single family homes (214) were built between 1981 and 1990. The most multi-family homes (47) were built between 1961 and 1970 and the next most (40) were built between 1919 and 1945. There were 16 multi-family houses built between 1996 and 2000.

In 2000 there were 2,617 apartments in the municipality. The most common apartment size was 3 rooms of which there were 887. There were 185 single room apartments and 417 apartments with five or more rooms. Of these apartments, a total of 2,378 apartments (90.9% of the total) were permanently occupied, while 155 apartments (5.9%) were seasonally occupied and 84 apartments (3.2%) were empty. As of 2009, the construction rate of new housing units was 1.7 new units per 1000 residents. The vacancy rate for the municipality, in 2010, was 0.28%.

The historical population is given in the following chart:

== Politics ==
In the 2007 federal election the most popular party was the SVP which received 25.31% of the vote. The next three most popular parties were the SP (19.38%), the FDP (14.88%) and the Green Party (12.41%). In the federal election, a total of 1,196 votes were cast, and the voter turnout was 41.0%.

== Economy ==
As of 2010, Crissier had an unemployment rate of 5.4%. As of 2008, there were 23 people employed in the primary economic sector and about 7 businesses involved in this sector. 2,367 people were employed in the secondary sector and there were 153 businesses in this sector. 6,398 people were employed in the tertiary sector, with 437 businesses in this sector. There were 3,336 residents of the municipality who were employed in some capacity, of which females made up 42.7% of the workforce.

In 2008 the total number of full-time equivalent jobs was 7,233. The number of jobs in the primary sector was 15, all of which were in agriculture. The number of jobs in the secondary sector was 2,283 of which 1,355 or (59.4%) were in manufacturing and 875 (38.3%) were in construction. The number of jobs in the tertiary sector was 4,935. In the tertiary sector; 2,861 or 58.0% were in wholesale or retail sales or the repair of motor vehicles, 127 or 2.6% were in the movement and storage of goods, 419 or 8.5% were in a hotel or restaurant, 126 or 2.6% were in the information industry, 69 or 1.4% were the insurance or financial industry, 312 or 6.3% were technical professionals or scientists, 100 or 2.0% were in education and 43 or 0.9% were in health care.

In 2000, there were 5,399 workers who commuted into the municipality and 2,585 workers who commuted away. The municipality is a net importer of workers, with about 2.1 workers entering the municipality for every one leaving. About 3.4% of the workforce coming into Crissier are coming from outside Switzerland. Of the working population, 23.2% used public transportation to get to work, and 60.4% used a private car.

== Religion ==
From the 2000 census, 2,897 or 44.0% were Roman Catholic, while 1,735 or 26.4% belonged to the Swiss Reformed Church. Of the rest of the population, there were 157 members of an Orthodox church (or about 2.39% of the population), there were 11 individuals (or about 0.17% of the population) who belonged to the Christian Catholic Church, and there were 294 individuals (or about 4.47% of the population) who belonged to another Christian church. There were 9 individuals (or about 0.14% of the population) who were Jewish, and 376 (or about 5.72% of the population) who were Islamic. There were 11 individuals who were Buddhist, 9 individuals who were Hindu and 15 individuals who belonged to another church. 778 (or about 11.83% of the population) belonged to no church, are agnostic or atheist, and 427 individuals (or about 6.49% of the population) did not answer the question.

== Education ==
In Crissier about 2,191 or (33.3%) of the population have completed non-mandatory upper secondary education, and 698 or (10.6%) have completed additional higher education (either university or a Fachhochschule). Of the 698 who completed tertiary schooling, 50.7% were Swiss men, 21.9% were Swiss women, 16.3% were non-Swiss men and 11.0% were non-Swiss women.

In the 2009/2010 school year there were a total of 1,030 students in the Crissier school district. In the Vaud cantonal school system, two years of non-obligatory pre-school are provided by the political districts. During the school year, the political district provided pre-school care for a total of 803 children of which 502 children (62.5%) received subsidized pre-school care. The canton's primary school program requires students to attend for four years. There were 530 students in the municipal primary school program. The obligatory lower secondary school program lasts for six years and there were 448 students in those schools. There were also 52 students who were home schooled or attended another non-traditional school.

As of 2000, there were 58 students in Crissier who came from another municipality, while 461 residents attended schools outside the municipality.

== Notable people ==
- Louis Curchod (1826 in Crissier – 1889) a Swiss engineer, telegraph specialist and director of the Swiss Telegraph Service
- Frédy Girardet (born 1936) a Swiss chef who cooks in the French tradition, proprietor of a Michelin three star restaurant in Crissier opened in 1971 and sold in 1996
- Paulo Diogo (born 1975 in Crissier) a retired Swiss professional footballer of Portuguese descent
