= Villars-Sainte-Croix =

- Municipality
- Flag Coat of arms
- Location of Villars-Sainte-Croix
- Location within Switzerland Location within Canton of Vaud
- Coordinates: 46°34′N 06°34′E
- Country: Switzerland
- Canton: Vaud
- District: Ouest Lausannois

Government
  - Mayor: Syndic; Michel Jenny

Area
  - Total: 1.66 km^{2} (0.64 sq mi)
- Elevation: 509 m (1,670 ft)

Population (2003)
  - Total: 625
  - Density: 377/km^{2} (975/sq mi)
- Time zone: UTC+01:00 (CET)
  - Summer (DST): UTC+02:00 (CEST)
- Postal code: 1029
- SFOS number: 5651
- ISO 3166 code: CH-VD
- Surrounded by: Bussigny-près-Lausanne, Crissier, Mex
- Website: www.villars-sainte-croix.ch

Villars-Sainte-Croix is a municipality in the Swiss canton of Vaud, located in the district of Ouest Lausannois.

== History ==
The Order of St John owned the old village church and a hospital which is mentioned in records from before 1272. The buildings still existed as ruins in 1546. Both had been part of the commandry of La Chaux.

== Geography ==
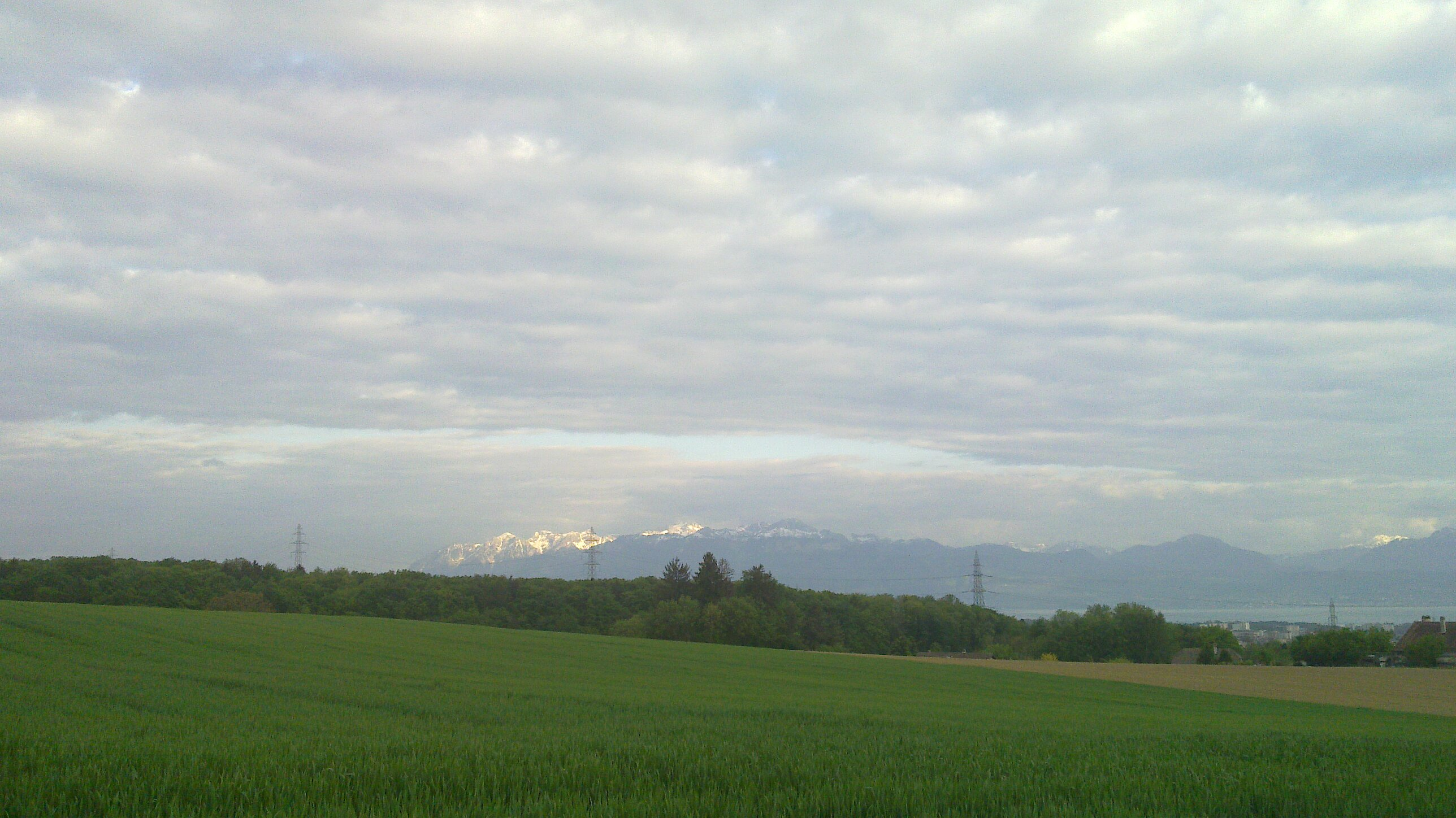
Countryside outside Villars-Sainte-Croix

Villars-Sainte-Croix has an area, as of 2009, of 1.7 square kilometers (0.66 mi^{2}). Of this area, 0.89 km^{2} (0.34 mi^{2}) or 53.9% is used for agricultural purposes, while 0.15 km^{2} (0.058 mi^{2}) or 9.1% is forested. Of the rest of the land, 0.62 km^{2} (0.24 mi^{2}) or 37.6% is settled (buildings or roads).

Of the built up area, industrial buildings made up 6.7% of the total area while housing and buildings made up 12.1% and transportation infrastructure made up 17.6%. Out of the forested land, 7.3% of the total land area is heavily forested and 1.8% is covered with orchards or small clusters of trees. Of the agricultural land, 43.6% is used for growing crops and 8.5% is pastures, while 1.8% is used for orchards or vine crops.

The municipality was part of the old Morges District until it was dissolved on 31 August 2006, and Villars-Sainte-Croix became part of the new district of Ouest Lausannois.

== Coat of arms ==
The blazon of the municipal coat of arms is Per pale Argent and Gules, a Maltese Cross counterchanged.

== Demographics ==
Villars-Sainte-Croix has a population (as of December 2020) of 960. As of 2008, 23.3% of the population are resident foreign nationals. Over the last 10 years (1999–2009 ) the population has changed at a rate of 19.8%. It has changed at a rate of 14.2% due to migration and at a rate of 5.3% due to births and deaths.

Most of the population (as of 2000) speaks French (530 or 88.0%), with Italian being second most common (31 or 5.1%) and German being third (25 or 4.2%).

Of the population in the municipality 97 or about 16.1% were born in Villars-Sainte-Croix and lived there in 2000. There were 293 or 48.7% who were born in the same canton, while 72 or 12.0% were born somewhere else in Switzerland, and 123 or 20.4% were born outside of Switzerland.

In 2008 there were 4 live births to Swiss citizens and 2 births to non-Swiss citizens, and in same time span there was 1 death of a Swiss citizen. Ignoring immigration and emigration, the population of Swiss citizens increased by 3 while the foreign population increased by 2. There were 2 Swiss men and 5 Swiss women who emigrated from Switzerland. At the same time, there were 4 non-Swiss men and 3 non-Swiss women who emigrated from Switzerland to another country. The total Swiss population change in 2008 (from all sources, including moves across municipal borders) was an increase of 11 and the non-Swiss population decreased by 3 people. This represents a population growth rate of 1.2%.

The age distribution, as of 2009, in Villars-Sainte-Croix is; 71 children or 10.5% of the population are between 0 and 9 years old and 73 teenagers or 10.8% are between 10 and 19. Of the adult population, 72 people or 10.6% of the population are between 20 and 29 years old. 90 people or 13.3% are between 30 and 39, 123 people or 18.2% are between 40 and 49, and 112 people or 16.5% are between 50 and 59. The senior population distribution is 84 people or 12.4% of the population are between 60 and 69 years old, 33 people or 4.9% are between 70 and 79, there are 16 people or 2.4% who are between 80 and 89, and there are 3 people or 0.4% who are 90 and older.

As of 2000, there were 239 people who were single and never married in the municipality. There were 312 married individuals, 13 widows or widowers and 38 individuals who are divorced.

As of 2000, there were 215 private households in the municipality, and an average of 2.7 persons per household. There were 35 households that consist of only one person and 10 households with five or more people. Out of a total of 223 households that answered this question, 15.7% were households made up of just one person and there was 1 adult who lived with their parents. Of the rest of the households, there are 67 married couples without children, 96 married couples with children There were 13 single parents with a child or children. There were 3 households that were made up of unrelated people and 8 households that were made up of some sort of institution or another collective housing.

In 2000 there were 90 single-family homes (or 62.9% of the total) out of a total of 143 inhabited buildings. There were 32 multi-family buildings (22.4%), along with 16 multi-purpose buildings that were mostly used for housing (11.2%) and 5 other use buildings (commercial or industrial) that also had some housing (3.5%). Of the single-family homes 3 were built before 1919, while 13 were built between 1990 and 2000. The greatest number of single-family homes (30) were built between 1981 and 1990. The most multi-family homes (13) were built between 1971 and 1980 and the next most (6) were built between 1981 and 1990. There was 1 multi-family house built between 1996 and 2000.

In 2000 there were 210 apartments in the municipality. The most common apartment size was 4 rooms of which there were 60. There were 10 single-room apartments and 86 apartments with five or more rooms. Of these apartments, a total of 170 apartments (81.0% of the total) were permanently occupied, while 40 apartments (19.0%) were seasonally occupied. As of 2009, the construction rate of new housing units was 3 new units per 1000 residents. The vacancy rate for the municipality, in 2010, was 0%.

The historical population is given in the following chart:

== Politics ==
In the 2007 federal election the most popular party was the SVP which received 26.71% of the vote. The next three most popular parties were the SP (20.3%), the FDP (19.04%) and the Green Party (9.88%). In the federal election, a total of 183 votes were cast, and the voter turnout was 46.0%.

== Economy ==
As of 2010, Villars-Sainte-Croix had an unemployment rate of 2.2%. As of 2008, there were 7 people employed in the primary economic sector and about 4 businesses involved in this sector. 392 people were employed in the secondary sector and there were 37 businesses in this sector. 462 people were employed in the tertiary sector, with 57 businesses in this sector. There were 323 residents of the municipality who were employed in some capacity, of which females made up 41.2% of the workforce.

In 2008 the total number of full-time equivalent jobs was 791. The number of jobs in the primary sector was 4, all of which were in agriculture. The number of jobs in the secondary sector was 375 of which 200 or (53.3%) were in manufacturing and 175 (46.7%) were in construction. The number of jobs in the tertiary sector was 412. In the tertiary sector; 213 or 51.7% were in wholesale or retail sales or the repair of motor vehicles, 72 or 17.5% were in the movement and storage of goods, 15 or 3.6% were in a hotel or restaurant, 77 or 18.7% were technical professionals or scientists, 7 or 1.7% were in education.

In 2000, there were 495 workers who commuted into the municipality and 264 workers who commuted away. The municipality is a net importer of workers, with about 1.9 workers entering the municipality for every one leaving. About 3.6% of the workforce coming into Villars-Sainte-Croix are coming from outside Switzerland. Of the working population, 10.2% used public transportation to get to work, and 76.5% used a private car.

== Religion ==
From the 2000 census, 234 or 38.9% were Roman Catholic, while 252 or 41.9% belonged to the Swiss Reformed Church. Of the rest of the population, there were 9 members of an Orthodox church (or about 1.50% of the population), and there were 18 individuals (or about 2.99% of the population) who belonged to another Christian church. There were 8 (or about 1.33% of the population) who were Islamic. 67 (or about 11.13% of the population) belonged to no church, are agnostic or atheist, and 23 individuals (or about 3.82% of the population) did not answer the question.

== Education ==
In Villars-Sainte-Croix about 246 or (40.9%) of the population have completed non-mandatory upper secondary education, and 95 or (15.8%) have completed additional higher education (either university or a Fachhochschule). Of the 95 who completed tertiary schooling, 56.8% were Swiss men, 24.2% were Swiss women, 11.6% were non-Swiss men and 7.4% were non-Swiss women.

In the 2009/2010 school year there were a total of 83 students in the Villars-Sainte-Croix school district. In the Vaud cantonal school system, two years of non-obligatory pre-school are provided by the political districts. During the school year, the political district provided pre-school care for a total of 803 children of which 502 children (62.5%) received subsidized pre-school care. The canton's primary school program requires students to attend for four years. There were 43 students in the municipal primary school program. The obligatory lower secondary school program lasts for six years and there were 40 students in those schools.

As of 2000, there were 35 students in Villars-Sainte-Croix who came from another municipality, while 80 residents attended schools outside the municipality.
