= Renens =

- Municipality
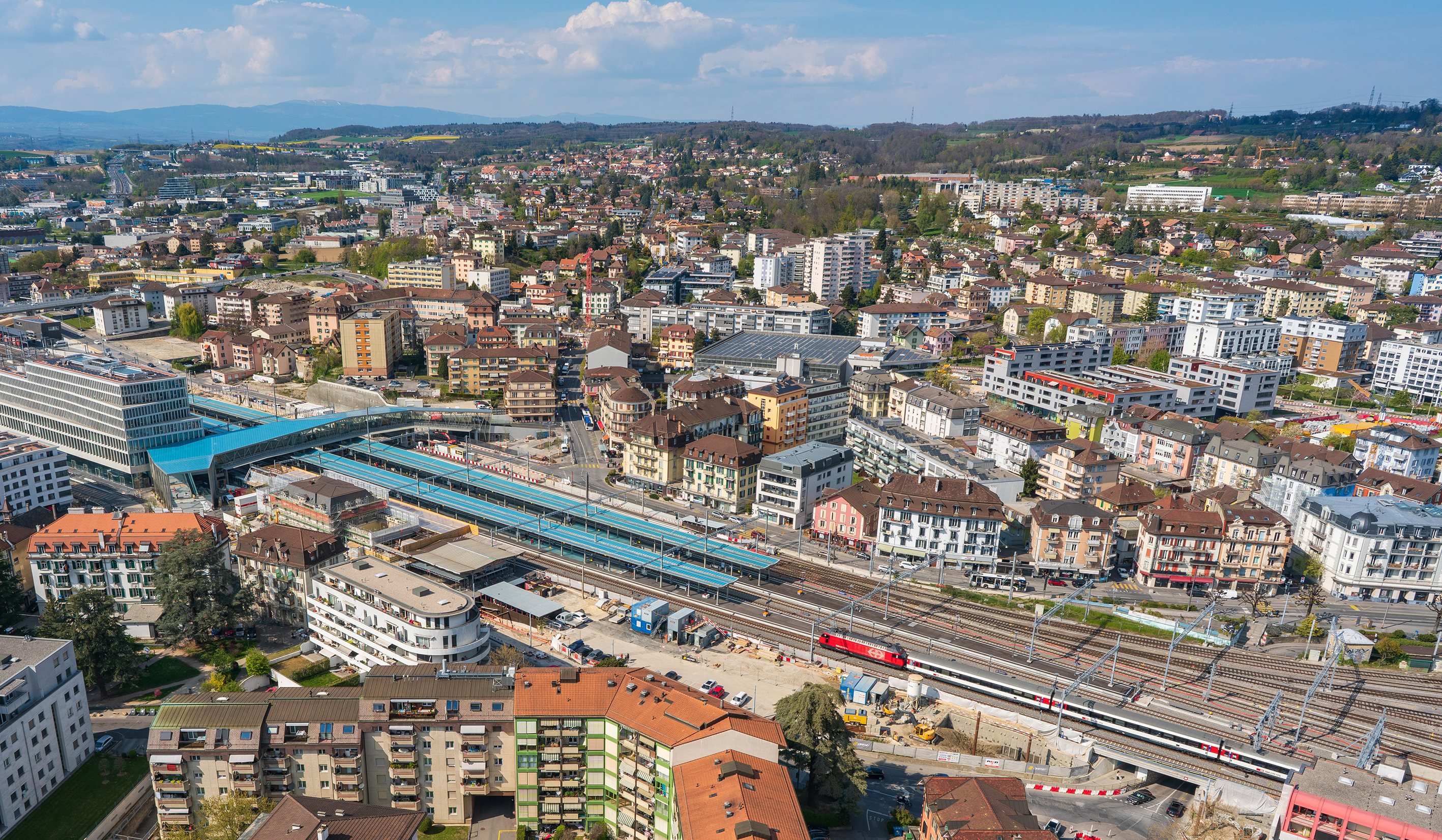
- Aerial view of Renens

- Flag Coat of arms
- Location of Renens
- Location within Switzerland Location within Canton of Vaud
- Coordinates: 46°32′N 6°35′E
- Country: Switzerland
- Canton: Vaud
- District: Ouest Lausannois a

Government
  - Mayor: Syndic; Marianne Huguenin POP (as of 2007)

Area
  - Total: 2.96 km^{2} (1.14 sq mi)
- Elevation: 415 m (1,362 ft)

Population (December 2003)
  - Total: 18,511
  - Density: 6,250/km^{2} (16,200/sq mi)
- Demonym: Les Renanais
- Time zone: UTC+01:00 (CET)
  - Summer (DST): UTC+02:00 (CEST)
- Postal code: 1020
- SFOS number: 5591
- ISO 3166 code: CH-VD
- Surrounded by: Lausanne, Crissier, Prilly
- Twin towns: Dietikon (Switzerland)
- Website: www.renens.ch

Renens (French pronunciation: [ʁə.n̪ɑ̃]) is a municipality in the canton of Vaud, Switzerland. It is located in the district of Ouest Lausannois, and is a suburb of the city of Lausanne. It is the fourth largest city in the canton. It is considered a very multiethnic town, as more than 50% of the inhabitants are resident foreign nationals from about a hundred countries.

== History ==
Renens is first mentioned around 888-896 as in villa Runingis. Neolithic tombs (near Bourdonnette) and a necropolis from the High Middle Ages (near Caudrey) have been discovered in the town.

In the Middle Ages Renens was owned by the cathedral chapter of Lausanne which created a benefice there between 1233 and 1303. In 1555 Claude de Praroman exchanged his old Vuarrens prebend with Bern against that of Renens for which he obtained the lordship rights. The house he already owned at 'En Plait' becomes his castle (Chateau de Renens). Lausanne bought the seigneury in 1750. The castle, sold in 1752 to Jean Pierre Audibert, passed successively to the Doxat, Sandoz, Sauter and Burckhardt families. There are rumors that Mozart stayed in this castle when he visited Lausanne.

Renens was around that time still a small village where a few families owned the countryside: the castle of 'Renens-sur-Roche' (18th century) where the Roëlls, Auberjonois and Guyots succeeded each other, and the 'Ferme des Tilleuls' (Tilia farm), built at the beginning of the 18th century by the Praroman family, where Pierre-Elie Bergier lived.

Renens became a municipality in 1798, attributed to the district of Lausanne (1798–2006) with its own municipal legislative Council from 1901. In the 1950s Renens became a city, and in 2006 the capital of the district of West-Lausanne. Since then, Renens continued to grow rapidly. In the 1980s and especially since the 1990s, there has been large-scale immigration to Renens, primarily from Portugal, Kosovo, the Albanian part of Macedonia and Spain. Since the 2000s, there has also been significant non-european immigration, among others from Turkey, Cape Verde, Angola and Vietnam.

== Geography ==
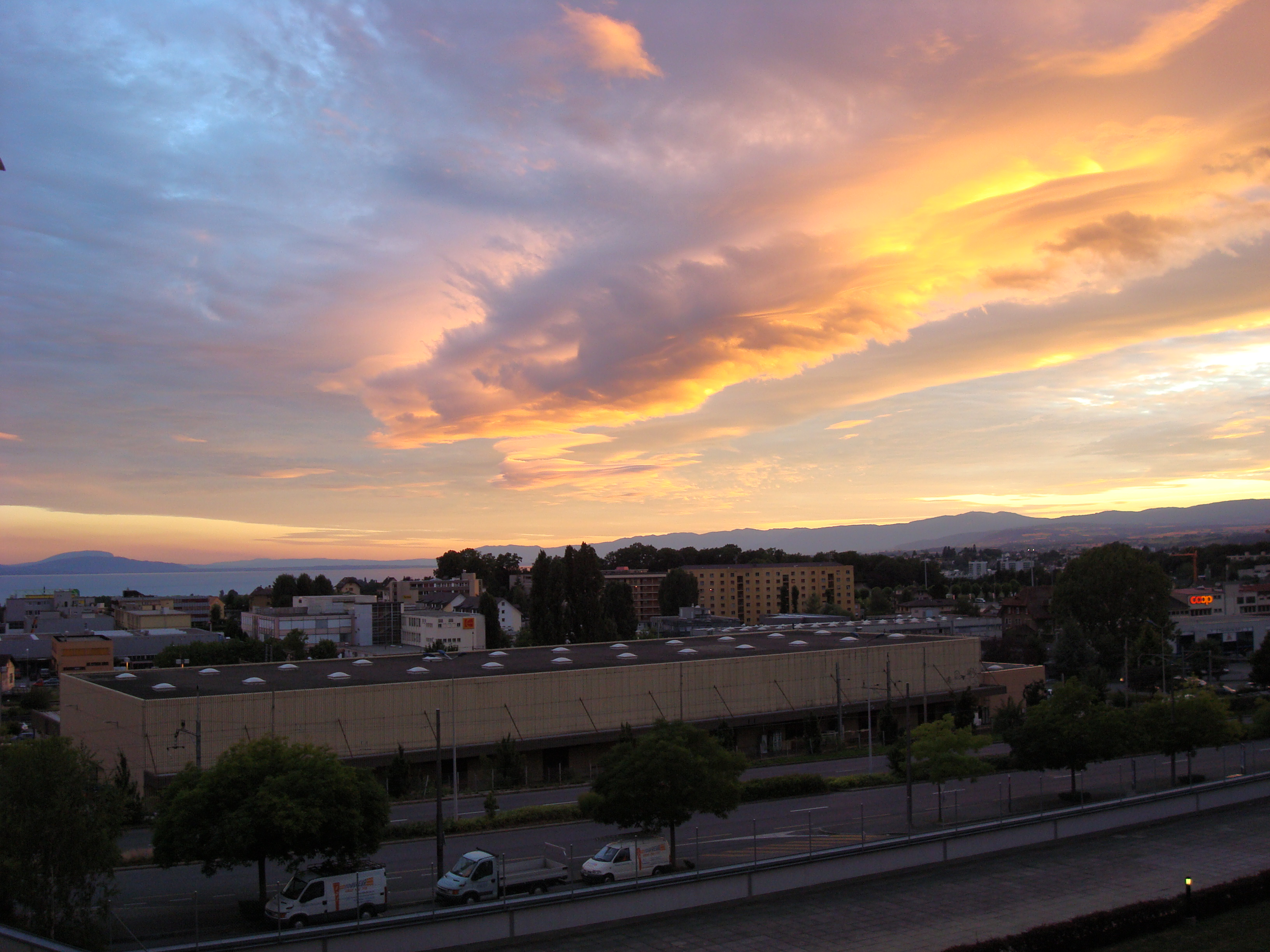
View of Renens at sunset

Renens has an area, as of 2009, of 2.96–2.95 square kilometers (1.14–1.14 mi^{2}) (depending on calculation method). Of this area, 0.1 km^{2} (0.039 mi^{2}) or 3.4% is used for agricultural purposes, while 0.07 km^{2} (0.027 mi^{2}) or 2.4% is forested. Of the rest of the land, 2.78 km^{2} (1.07 mi^{2}) or 93.9% is settled (buildings or roads).

Of the built up area, industrial buildings made up 13.9% of the total area while housing and buildings made up 41.6% and transportation infrastructure made up 28.7%. Power and water infrastructure as well as other special developed areas made up 3.4% of the area while parks, green belts and sports fields made up 6.4%. Out of the forested land, all of the forested land area is covered with heavy forests. Of the agricultural land, 1.0% is used for growing crops, while 1.7% is used for orchards or vine crops.

The municipality was part of the Lausanne District until it was dissolved on 31 August 2006, and Renens became part of the new district of Ouest Lausannois.

The municipality is the capital of the new district of Ouest lausannois. It is part of the agglomeration of Lausanne, and Lausanne Metro Line M1 terminates at Renens railway station. The Swiss Federal Railway line connects Renens to Lausanne more directly, as well as offering some longer-distance trains. Renens is located close to junctions 17 and 18 of the A1 motorway.

== Coat of arms ==
The blazon of the municipal coat of arms is Gules, two Pales wavy Argent, Chief of the same.

== Demographics ==
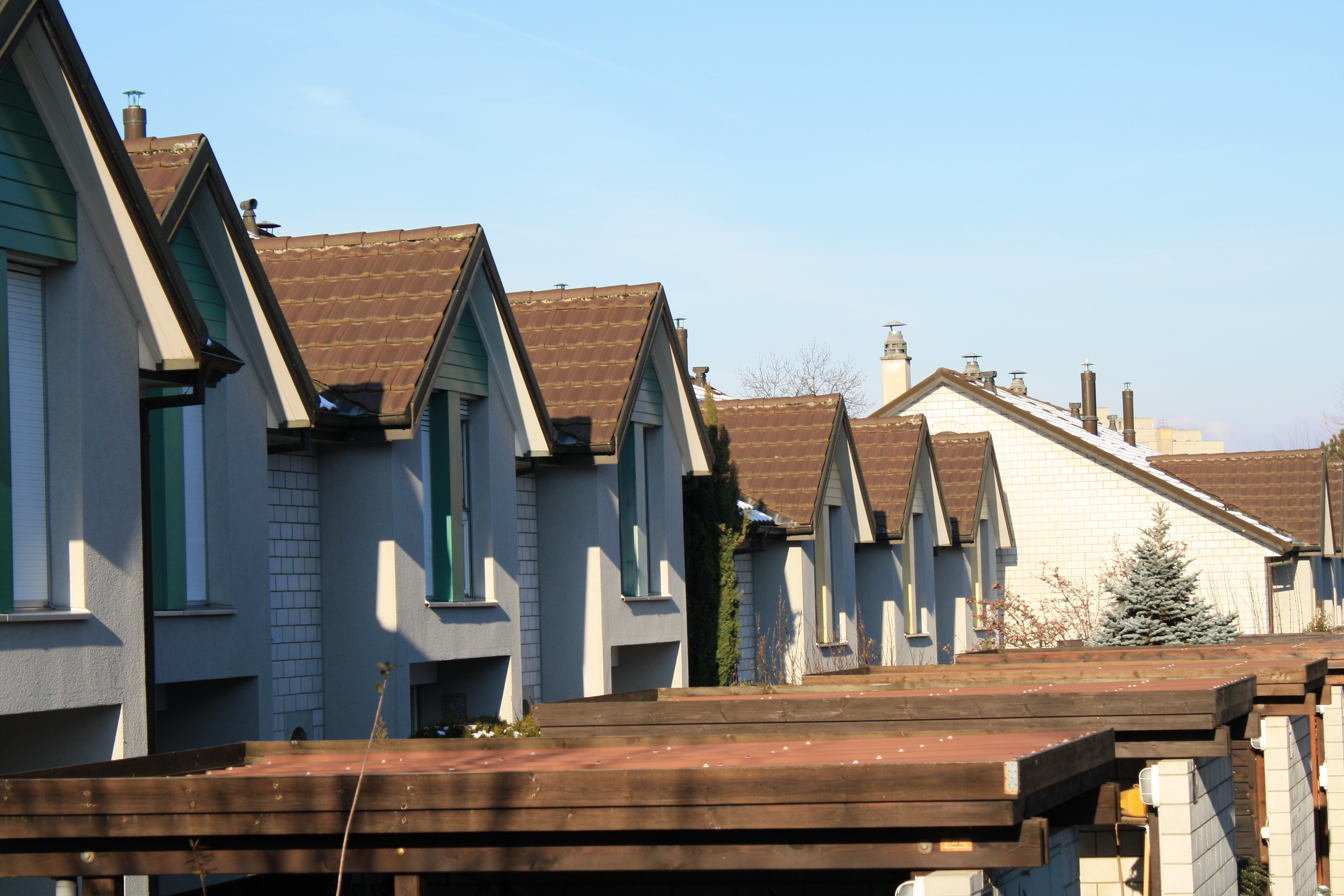
Row of houses in Renens

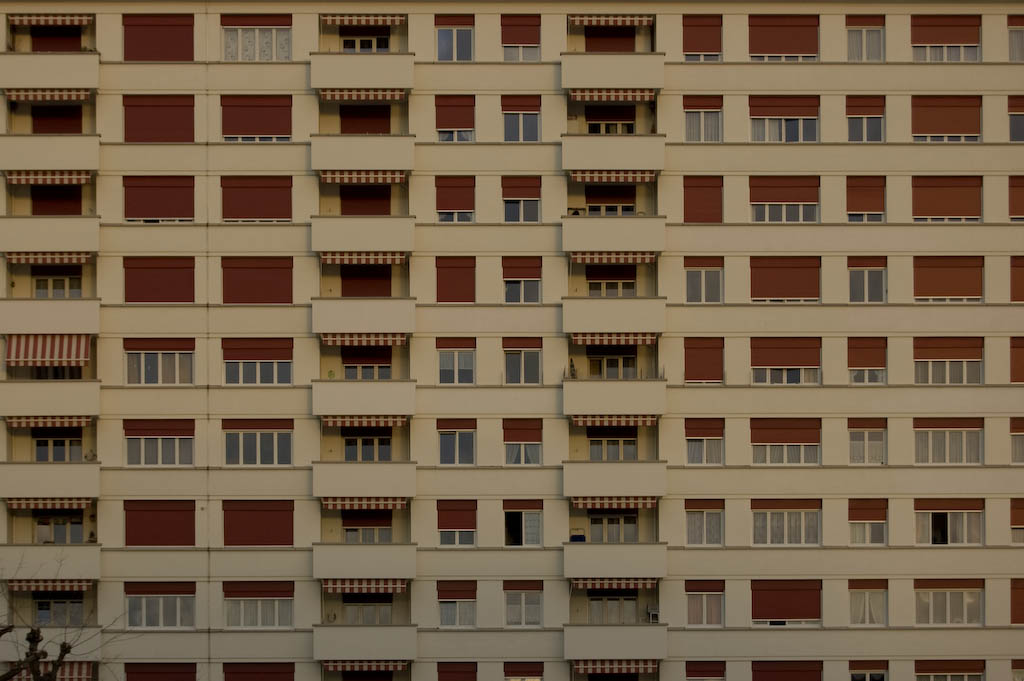
View of an apartment block in Renens

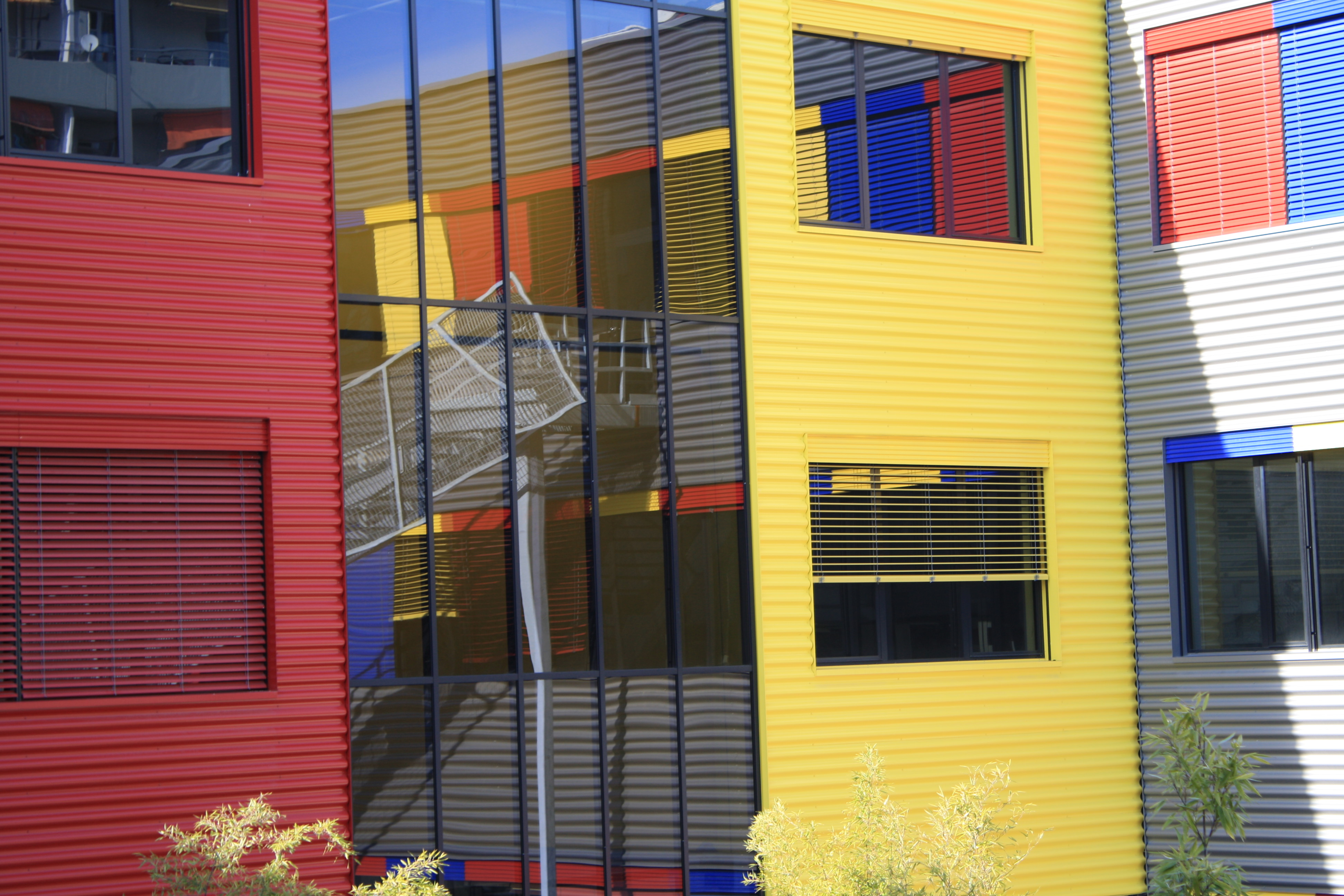
ECAL building in Renens

Renens has a population (as of December 2020) of 20,834. As of 2008, 51.2% of the population are resident foreign nationals. Between 1999 and 2009 the population increased by 14.4%.

Most of the population (as of 2000) spoke French (13,576 or 73.8%), with Italian being second most common (1,214 or 6.6%) and Portuguese being third (810 or 4.4%). There were 567 residents who speak German and 11 who spoke Romansh.

Of the population in the municipality 2,992 or about 16.3% were born in Renens and lived there in 2000. There were 4,431 or 24.1% who were born in the same canton, while 2,566 or 13.9% were born somewhere else in Switzerland, and 7,854 or 42.7% were born outside of Switzerland.

In 2008, there were 92 live births to Swiss citizens and 141 births to non-Swiss citizens, and in same time span there were 108 deaths of Swiss citizens and 29 non-Swiss citizen deaths. Ignoring immigration and emigration, the population of Swiss citizens decreased by 16 while the foreign population increased by 112. There were 3 Swiss men and 3 Swiss women who immigrated back to Switzerland. At the same time, there were 287 non-Swiss men and 286 non-Swiss women who immigrated from another country to Switzerland. The total Swiss population change in 2008 (from all sources, including moves across municipal borders) was an increase of 358 and the non-Swiss population increased by 208 people. This represents a population growth rate of 3.1%.

In 2009 the age distribution in Renens was the following: 2,091 residents or 10.9% of the population were nine years of age or younger; 2,102 (11.0%) were between 10 and 19; 3,103 (16.2%) were between 20 and 29 years old; 3,009 (15.7%) were between 30 and 39; 2,931 (15.3%) were between 40 and 49; 2,201 (11.5%) were between 50 and 59; 1,778 (9.3%) were between 60 and 69; 1,134 (5.9%) were between 70 and 79; 655 (3.4%) were between 80 and 89; and 118 (0.6%) were 90 and older.

In 2000 there were 7,576 people who were single and never married in the municipality. There were 8,731 married individuals, 913 widows or widowers and 1,186 individuals who are divorced.

In 2000 there were 8,196 private households in the municipality, and an average of 2.2 persons per household. There were 3,213 households that consist of only one person and 397 households with five or more people. Out of a total of 8,409 households that answered this question, 38.2% were households made up of just one person and there were 51 adults who lived with their parents. Of the rest of the households, there are 2,034 married couples without children, 2,245 married couples with children. There were 494 single parents with a child or children. There were 159 households that were made up of unrelated people and 213 households that were made up of some sort of institution or another collective housing.

In 2000 there were 600 single family homes (or 41.3% of the total) out of a total of 1,452 inhabited buildings. There were 496 multi-family buildings (34.2%), along with 248 multi-purpose buildings that were mostly used for housing (17.1%) and 108 other use buildings (commercial or industrial) that also had some housing (7.4%). Of the single family homes 60 were built before 1919, while 83 were built between 1990 and 2000. The greatest number of single family homes (170) were built between 1981 and 1990. The most multi-family homes (137) were built between 1946 and 1960 and the next most (89) were built before 1919. There were 17 multi-family houses built between 1996 and 2000.

In 2000 there were 8,959 apartments in the municipality. The most common apartment size was three rooms, of which there were 3,095. There were 919 single room apartments and 708 apartments with five or more rooms. Of these apartments, a total of 8,015 apartments (89.5% of the total) were permanently occupied, while 748 apartments (8.3%) were seasonally occupied and 196 apartments (2.2%) were empty. As of 2009, the construction rate of new housing units was 0 new units per 1000 residents. The vacancy rate for the municipality, in 2010, was 0.12%.

The historical population is given in the following chart:

== Politics ==
In the 2007 federal election the most popular party was the SP which received 23.9% of the vote. The next three most popular parties were the SVP (21.39%), the PdA Party (14.34%) and the Green Party (13.66%). In the federal election, a total of 2,897 votes were cast, and the voter turnout was 39.7%.

== Economy ==
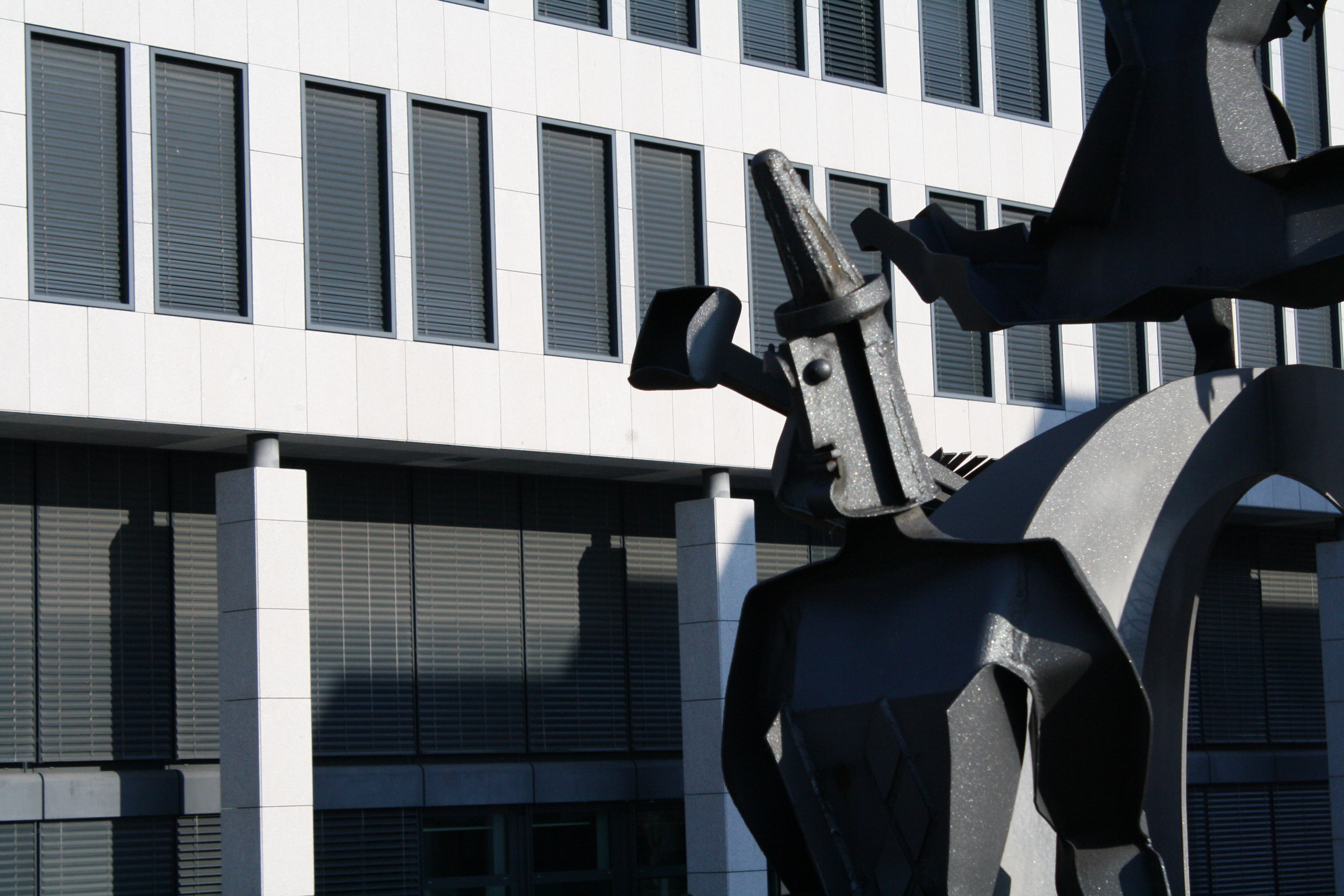
UBS building in Renens

As of 2010, Renens had an unemployment rate of 7.6%. As of 2008, there were 8 people employed in the primary economic sector and about 1 business involved in this sector. 2,338 people were employed in the secondary sector and there were 153 businesses in this sector. 7,493 people were employed in the tertiary sector, with 579 businesses in this sector. There were 9,293 residents of the municipality who were employed in some capacity, of which females made up 43.5% of the workforce.

In 2008, the total number of full-time equivalent jobs was 8,699. The number of jobs in the primary sector was 7, all of which were in agriculture. The number of jobs in the secondary sector was 2,245 of which 1,048 or (46.7%) were in manufacturing and 855 (38.1%) were in construction. The number of jobs in the tertiary sector was 6,447. In the tertiary sector; 1,795 or 27.8% were in wholesale or retail sales or the repair of motor vehicles, 1,452 or 22.5% were in the movement and storage of goods, 244 or 3.8% were in a hotel or restaurant, 470 or 7.3% were in the information industry, 735 or 11.4% were the insurance or financial industry, 390 or 6.0% were technical professionals or scientists, 299 or 4.6% were in education and 500 or 7.8% were in health care.

In 2000, there were 7,789 workers who commuted into the municipality and 7,087 workers who commuted away. The municipality is a net importer of workers, with about 1.1 workers entering the municipality for every one leaving. About 2.2% of the workforce coming into Renens are coming from outside Switzerland. Of the working population, 31.7% used public transportation to get to work, and 49.8% used a private car.

== Religion ==
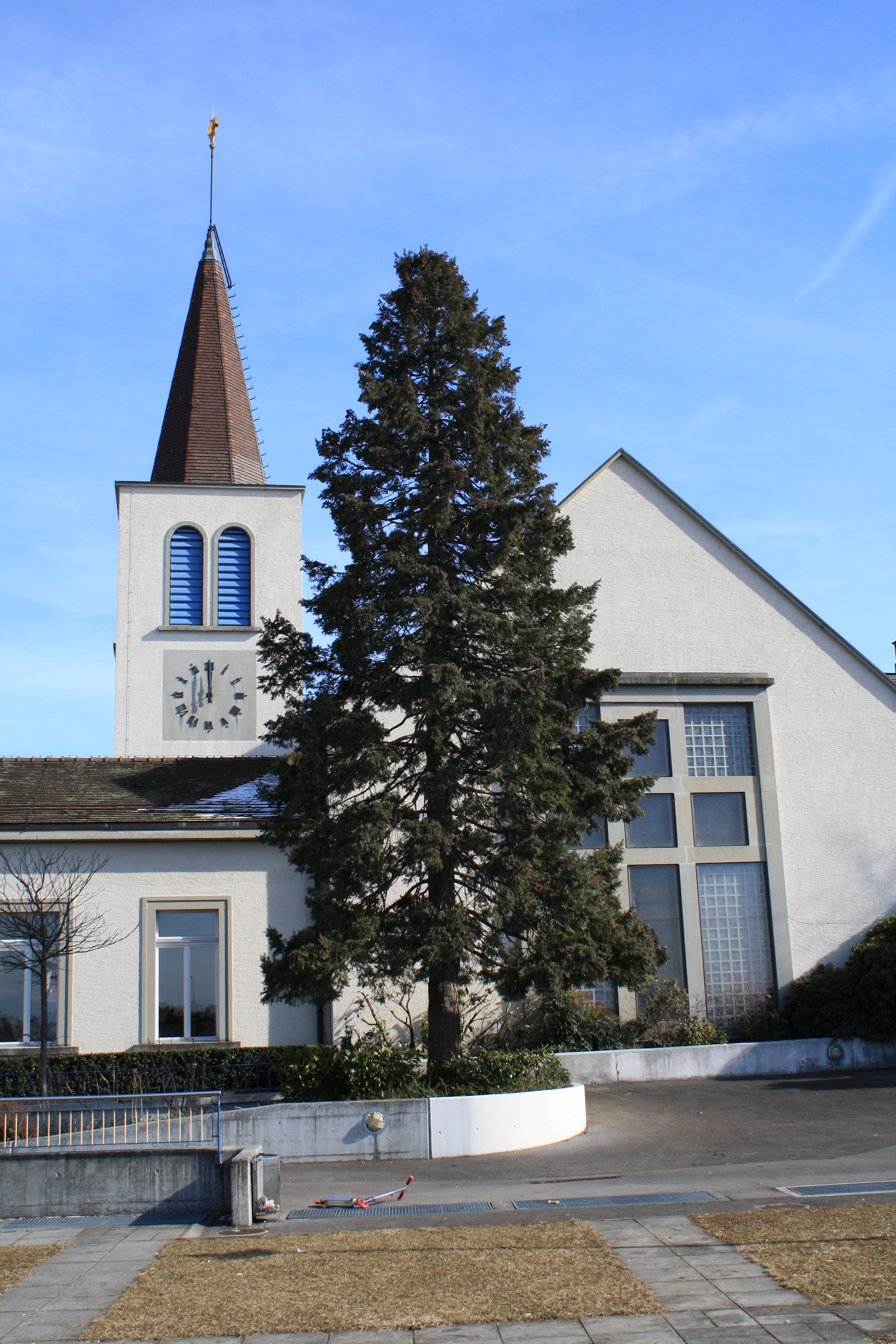
A Swiss Reformed church in Renens

From the 2000 census, 8,162 or 44.3% were Roman Catholic, while 3,952 or 21.5% belonged to the Swiss Reformed Church. Of the rest of the population, there were 740 members of an Orthodox church (or about 4.02% of the population), there were 14 individuals (or about 0.08% of the population) who belonged to the Christian Catholic Church, and there were 757 individuals (or about 4.11% of the population) who belonged to another Christian church. There were 1,662 Muslims (or about 9.03% of the population) and 20 individuals (or about 0.11% of the population) were Jewish . There were 65 individuals who were Buddhist, 159 individuals who were Hindu and 36 individuals who belonged to another church. 1,904 (or about 10.34% of the population) belonged to no church, are agnostic or atheist, and 1,301 individuals (or about 7.07% of the population) did not answer the question.

== Education ==
In Renens about 5,518 or (30.0%) of the population have completed non-mandatory upper secondary education, and 1,664 or (9.0%) have completed additional higher education (either university or a Fachhochschule). Of the 1,664 who completed tertiary schooling, 42.0% were Swiss men, 21.0% were Swiss women, 24.5% were non-Swiss men and 12.5% were non-Swiss women.

In the 2009/2010 school year there were a total of 2,355 students in the Renens (VD) school district. In the Vaud cantonal school system, two years of non-obligatory pre-school are provided by the political districts. During the school year, the political district provided pre-school care for a total of 803 children of which 502 children (62.5%) received subsidized pre-school care. The canton's primary school program requires students to attend for four years. There were 1,329 students in the municipal primary school program. The obligatory lower secondary school program lasts for six years and there were 916 students in those schools. There were also 110 students who were home schooled or attended another non-traditional school.

As of 2000, there were 93 students in Renens who came from another municipality, while 1,188 residents attended schools outside the municipality.

== Transportation ==
The municipality has a railway station, Renens VD, that sits at the junction of multiple major railway lines. It has regular service to Lausanne, Geneva, and points beyond. It is also the western terminus of the Lausanne Metro.

== Notable people ==
- Fabio Celestini (born 1975 in Lausanne) a Swiss professional footballer / football manager. He played in Renens from 1992 to 1995. He was trainer of FC Renens between 2011 and 2013, and president of the club in 2013–2014.
- Henri Dès (born 1940 in Renens) a French-language children's singer and songwriter, fourth in the 1970 Eurovision Song Contest
- Gabriel Reymond (1923–2021) racewalker, competed in the 1952 and 1960 Summer Olympics, lived in Renens
- Bigambo Rochat (born 1991 in Renens) a Swiss footballer
- Alfred Stucky (1892–1969) a swiss dam engineer who established his engineering firm, today part of Gruner AG, in Renens in 1926
- Frédéric Veseli (born 1992 in Renens) an Albanian professional footballer, over 130 club caps
