= Maigret and the Reluctant Witnesses =

1959 novel by Georges Simenon

Maigret and the Reluctant Witness (French: Maigret et les témoins récalcitrants) is a 1959 detective novel by the Belgian writer Georges Simenon featuring Jules Maigret of the French Judicial police. It was written in Echandens, Switzerland, on 16–23 October 1958 and first published by Presses de la Cité in 1959. The 53rd Maigret novel, it was translated into English by Daphne Woodward in 1959 by William Hobson in 2018, and has been adapted for television in French (twice), English, Japanese, and Czech.

== Synopsis ==
Maigret's investigation of a murder in the commune of Ivry-sur-Seine, a south-eastern inner suburb of Paris in the Val-de-Marne department, is complicated by the interferrence of the new breed of examining magistrate.

== Adaptations ==
=== Television ===
- Rupert Davies, BBC TV, 1 January 1962
- Kinya Aikawa, 警視と口の固い証人たち (Close-mouthed Witnesses), Asahi Broadcasting Corporation, 2 June 1978
- Jean Richard, Antenne 2, 22 July 1978.
- Radovan Lukavský, Czechoslovakian TV, Vzpurní svědkové (Rebellious witnesses),1983.
- Bruno Crémer, France 2, 5 November 1993.

== Gallery ==
Ivry-sur-Seine commune adjoining southeast Paris

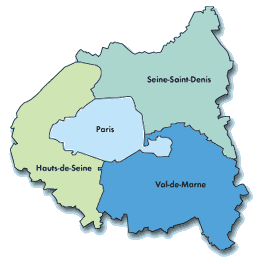
Val-de-Marne department
