= Velcro Companies =

Swiss corporation behind popular hook-and-loop fastener

Velcro IP Holdings LLC
- Velcro official logo and wordmark
- Trade name: Velcro Companies
- Formerly: Velcro SA.
- Type: Private
- Industry: Manufacturing: fastening systems
- Founded: 10 June 1941
- Founder: George de Mestral
- Headquarters: United Kingdom
- Number of locations: Manufacturing: 7 countries
- Area served: Worldwide
- Key people: Gabriella Parisse (CEO); William Hamilton (CFO)
- Products: Hook-and-loop fasteners, and other products
- Brands: VELCRO
- Number of employees: 2,500
- Subsidiaries: Alfatex Group
- Website: www.velcro.co.uk

Velcro IP Holdings LLC, trading as Velcro Companies and commonly referred to as Velcro is a British privately held company, founded by Swiss electrical engineer George de Mestral in the 1950s. It is the original manufacturer of hook-and-loop fasteners, which de Mestral invented.

== History ==
A microscopic view of the hook of a Burdock seed

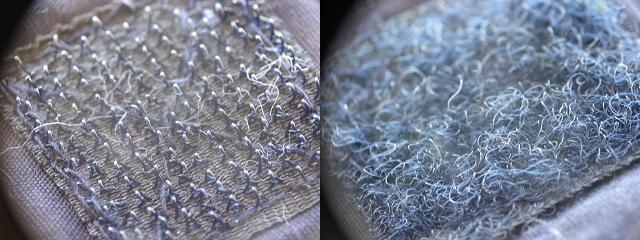
Hook-and-loop fastener, invented by de Mestral

Swiss electrical engineer George de Mestral who studied at EPFL invented his first touch fastener when, in 1941, he went for a walk in the Jura mountains, and wondered why burdock seeds clung to his woolen socks and coat, and also his dog Milka. He discovered it could be turned into something useful. He patented it in 1955, and subsequently refined and developed its practical manufacture until its commercial introduction in the late 1950s.

The fastener consisted of two components: a lineal fabric strip with tiny hooks that could 'mate' with another fabric strip with smaller loops, attaching temporarily, until pulled apart. Initially made of cotton, which proved impractical, the fastener was eventually constructed with nylon and polyester.

De Mestral gave the name Velcro, a portmanteau of the French words velours ('velvet') and crochet ('hook'), to his invention, as well as to the Swiss company he founded; Velcro SA.

The company continues to manufacture and market the fastening system. Originally envisioned as a fastener for clothing, today, Velcro is used across a wide array of industries and applications; including healthcare, the military, land vehicles, aircraft, and even spacecraft.

"Velcro" is used by some as a genericized trademark, and is additionally sometimes used as a verb. In 2017, Velcro released a "Don't Say Velcro" campaign in an attempt to keep their brand name distinctive from other hook-and-loop fasteners to help keep their trademark protection.
