= Mestral Castle =

Castle in Échichens, Switzerland

- Château de Mestral; Château de Saint-Saphorin-sur-Morges
- Échichens
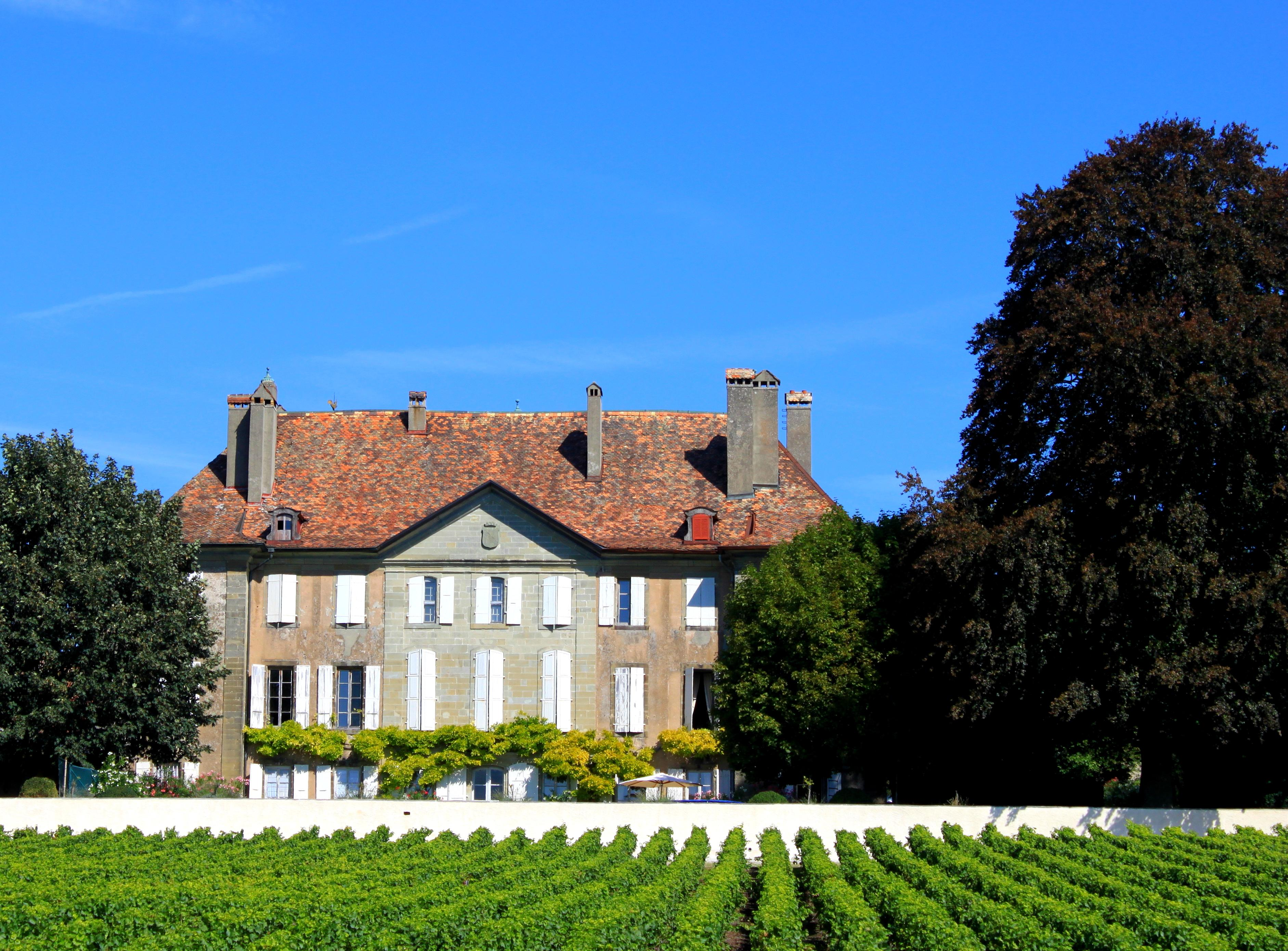
- Château de Saint-Saphorin

Site information
- Code: CH-VD
- Condition: Preserved

Location
- Location within Canton of Vaud Location within Switzerland
- Coordinates: 46°32′43.14″N 6°29′14.80″E
- Height: 526 m above the sea

Site history
- Built: 17th century

Swiss Cultural Property of National Significance

The Castle of Saint-Saphorin-sur-Morges, also called Mestral Castle, is a castle in the municipality of Échichens in the canton of Vaud in Switzerland. It is a Swiss heritage site of national significance.

== History ==
The current castle was built on the ruins of an old feudal castle which consisted of two buildings divided by a courtyard: one of them served as a dungeon while the other was used as housing for the local lord.

In 1727, General François-Louis de Pesmes de Saint-Saphorin, after a career as a soldier and a diplomat, retired to Saint-Saphorin where he was born. Previously, he had the castle rebuilt, which already belonged to his family, on the model of that of Vullierens. His daughter, Judith-Louise, married Gabriel-Henri de Mestral, then Lord of Pampigny.

The castle took the name of Mestral, and among the successive owners, the engineer Georges de Mestral, inventor of Velcro, inherited it on the death of his father in 1966.

== Viticulture ==
The castle is classified as cultural property of national importance. It is surrounded by a 4.6-hectare (11-acre) wine estate where the Grand Cru Saint-Saphorin-sur-Morges AOC La Côte is produced.

== See also ==
- List of castles in Switzerland
- Château
