= Bremblens =

- Municipality
- Flag Coat of arms
- Location of Bremblens
- Location within Switzerland Location within Canton of Vaud
- Coordinates: 46°33′N 06°31′E
- Country: Switzerland
- Canton: Vaud
- District: Morges

Government
  - Mayor: Syndic; Yves Cornu

Area
  - Total: 2.95 km^{2} (1.14 sq mi)
- Elevation: 464 m (1,522 ft)

Population (2003)
  - Total: 411
  - Density: 139/km^{2} (361/sq mi)
- Time zone: UTC+01:00 (CET)
  - Summer (DST): UTC+02:00 (CEST)
- Postal code: 1121
- SFOS number: 5622
- ISO 3166 code: CH-VD
- Surrounded by: Aclens, Bussigny-près-Lausanne, Échandens, Échichens, Lonay, Romanel-sur-Morges, Saint-Saphorin-sur-Morges
- Website: www.bremblens.ch

Bremblens (French pronunciation: [bʁɑ̃blɑ̃]) is a municipality in the Swiss canton of Vaud, located in the district of Morges.

== History ==
Bremblens was first mentioned in 1177.

== Geography ==
Bremblens has an area, as of 2009, of 2.9 square kilometers (1.1 mi^{2}). Of this area, 1.99 km^{2} (0.77 mi^{2}) or 68.6% is used for agricultural purposes, while 0.59 km^{2} (0.23 mi^{2}) or 20.3% is forested. Of the rest of the land, 0.35 km^{2} (0.14 mi^{2}) or 12.1% is settled (buildings or roads), 0.02 km^{2} (4.9 acres) or 0.7% is either rivers or lakes.

Of the built up area, housing and buildings made up 6.6% and transportation infrastructure made up 4.1%. Out of the forested land, 19.0% of the total land area is heavily forested and 1.4% is covered with orchards or small clusters of trees. Of the agricultural land, 55.2% is used for growing crops and 3.4% is pastures, while 10.0% is used for orchards or vine crops. All the water in the municipality is flowing water.

The municipality was part of the Morges District until it was dissolved on 31 August 2006, and Bremblens became part of the new district of Morges.

The municipality is located between the Venoge and Morges rivers.

== Coat of arms ==
The blazon of the municipal coat of arms is Per fess, 1. Argent, an eagle displayed Gules; 2. Gules a wavy bar Argent.

== Demographics ==
Bremblens has a population (as of December 2020) of 584. As of 2008, 13.0% of the population are resident foreign nationals. Over the last 10 years (1999–2009) the population has changed at a rate of 37%. It has changed at a rate of 29.7% due to migration and at a rate of 8.5% due to births and deaths.

Most of the population (as of 2000) speaks French (312 or 86.7%), with German being second most common (20 or 5.6%) and English being third (7 or 1.9%). There are 4 people who speak Italian.

Of the population in the municipality 82 or about 22.8% were born in Bremblens and lived there in 2000. There were 162 or 45.0% who were born in the same canton, while 61 or 16.9% were born somewhere else in Switzerland, and 44 or 12.2% were born outside of Switzerland.

In 2008 there were 5 live births to Swiss citizens and 1 birth to non-Swiss citizens, and in same time span there were 2 deaths of Swiss citizens. Ignoring immigration and emigration, the population of Swiss citizens increased by 3 while the foreign population increased by 1. There were 3 Swiss men and 2 Swiss women who immigrated back to Switzerland. At the same time, there were 5 non-Swiss men and 2 non-Swiss women who immigrated from another country to Switzerland. The total Swiss population change in 2008 (from all sources, including moves across municipal borders) was a decrease of 2 and the non-Swiss population increased by 3 people. This represents a population growth rate of 0.2%.

The age distribution, as of 2009, in Bremblens is; 59 children or 13.1% of the population are between 0 and 9 years old and 50 teenagers or 11.1% are between 10 and 19. Of the adult population, 43 people or 9.5% of the population are between 20 and 29 years old. 78 people or 17.3% are between 30 and 39, 72 people or 15.9% are between 40 and 49, and 62 people or 13.7% are between 50 and 59. The senior population distribution is 45 people or 10.0% of the population are between 60 and 69 years old, 27 people or 6.0% are between 70 and 79, there are 13 people or 2.9% who are between 80 and 89, and there are 3 people or 0.7% who are 90 and older.

As of 2000, there were 137 people who were single and never married in the municipality. There were 194 married individuals, 12 widows or widowers and 17 individuals who are divorced.

As of 2000, there were 140 private households in the municipality, and an average of 2.6 persons per household. There were 30 households that consist of only one person and 5 households with five or more people. Out of a total of 142 households that answered this question, 21.1% were households made up of just one person and there was 1 adult who lived with their parents. Of the rest of the households, there are 44 married couples without children, 55 married couples with children There were 8 single parents with a child or children. There were 2 households that were made up of unrelated people and 2 households that were made up of some sort of institution or another collective housing.

In 2000 there were 60 single family homes (or 62.5% of the total) out of a total of 96 inhabited buildings. There were 20 multi-family buildings (20.8%), along with 11 multi-purpose buildings that were mostly used for housing (11.5%) and 5 other use buildings (commercial or industrial) that also had some housing (5.2%). Of the single family homes 15 were built before 1919, while 11 were built between 1990 and 2000. The most multi-family homes (7) were built before 1919 and the next most (6) were built between 1971 and 1980. There were 2 multi-family houses built between 1996 and 2000.

In 2000 there were 144 apartments in the municipality. The most common apartment size was 4 rooms of which there were 41. There were 3 single room apartments and 71 apartments with five or more rooms. Of these apartments, a total of 135 apartments (93.8% of the total) were permanently occupied, while 6 apartments (4.2%) were seasonally occupied and 3 apartments (2.1%) were empty. As of 2009, the construction rate of new housing units was 2.2 new units per 1000 residents. The vacancy rate for the municipality, in 2010, was 0%.

The historical population is given in the following chart:

== Politics ==
In the 2007 federal election the most popular party was the SVP which received 27.9% of the vote. The next three most popular parties were the FDP (18.8%), the SP (16.6%) and the Green Party (15.58%). In the federal election, a total of 142 votes were cast, and the voter turnout was 48.1%.

== Economy ==
As of 2010, Bremblens had an unemployment rate of 1.9%. As of 2008, there were 41 people employed in the primary economic sector and about 10 businesses involved in this sector. 51 people were employed in the secondary sector and there were 8 businesses in this sector. 107 people were employed in the tertiary sector, with 20 businesses in this sector. There were 190 residents of the municipality who were employed in some capacity, of which females made up 37.4% of the workforce.

In 2008 the total number of full-time equivalent jobs was 175. The number of jobs in the primary sector was 31, all of which were in agriculture. The number of jobs in the secondary sector was 47 of which 5 or (10.6%) were in manufacturing and 42 (89.4%) were in construction. The number of jobs in the tertiary sector was 97. In the tertiary sector; 50 or 51.5% were in wholesale or retail sales or the repair of motor vehicles, 13 or 13.4% were in the movement and storage of goods, 5 or 5.2% were technical professionals or scientists, 2 or 2.1% were in education.

In 2000, there were 101 workers who commuted into the municipality and 141 workers who commuted away. The municipality is a net exporter of workers, with about 1.4 workers leaving the municipality for every one entering. Of the working population, 8.9% used public transportation to get to work, and 67.9% used a private car.

== Religion ==
From the 2000 census, 72 or 20.0% were Roman Catholic, while 218 or 60.6% belonged to the Swiss Reformed Church. Of the rest of the population, there were 4 members of an Orthodox church (or about 1.11% of the population), there was 1 individual who belongs to the Christian Catholic Church, and there were 6 individuals (or about 1.67% of the population) who belonged to another Christian church. There was 1 individual who was Islamic. There were 4 individuals who belonged to another church. 46 (or about 12.78% of the population) belonged to no church, are agnostic or atheist, and 11 individuals (or about 3.06% of the population) did not answer the question.

== Education ==
In Bremblens about 136 or (37.8%) of the population have completed non-mandatory upper secondary education, and 76 or (21.1%) have completed additional higher education (either university or a Fachhochschule). Of the 76 who completed tertiary schooling, 60.5% were Swiss men, 27.6% were Swiss women, 7.9% were non-Swiss men.

In the 2009/2010 school year there were a total of 67 students in the Bremblens school district. In the Vaud cantonal school system, two years of non-obligatory pre-school are provided by the political districts. During the school year, the political district provided pre-school care for a total of 631 children of which 203 children (32.2%) received subsidized pre-school care. The canton's primary school program requires students to attend for four years. There were 39 students in the municipal primary school program. The obligatory lower secondary school program lasts for six years and there were 28 students in those schools.

As of 2000, there were 15 students in Bremblens who came from another municipality, while 55 residents attended schools outside the municipality.
