= George de Mestral =

Swiss electrical engineer who invented the hook and loop fastener

- Born: 19 June 1907; Saint-Saphorin-sur-Morges, Lausanne, Switzerland
- Died: 8 February 1990 (aged 82); Commugny, Switzerland
- Occupation: Electrical engineer
- Known for: inventing Velcro
- Children: 3

George de Mestral (19 June 1907 – 8 February 1990) was a Swiss electrical engineer who invented the hook and loop fastener which he named Velcro.

== Biography ==
He was born to Albert de Mestral, an agronomist engineer, and Marthe de Goumoëns in Saint Saphorin sur Morges, near Lausanne, Switzerland. De Mestral designed and patented a toy airplane at age twelve. He attended the École polytechnique fédérale de Lausanne (EPFL). After graduation in 1930, he worked in the machine shop of an engineering company. He went for his favorite hobby of hunting and when he came back he discovered that his dog was covered with burs that had attached themselves to its fur. He then worked on inventing hook and loop fasteners for ten years starting in 1948. In 1955, he successfully patented hook and loop, eventually selling 60 million yards (about 55,000 km) a year through a multimillion-dollar company.

He made additional inventions, and his wife said that his asparagus peeler was "one stupid little thing that sold very well."

=== Marriage ===
De Mestral was married three times: in 1932 to Jeanne Schnyder (two sons: Henri and François), in 1949 to Monique Panchaud de Bottens, onetime fiancée of James Bond creator Ian Fleming (one son: Charles), and Helen Mary Dale. On his father's death in 1966, de Mestral inherited the family home in Saint Saphorin sur Morges, château Saint-Saphorin-sur-Morges (Mestral Castle).

=== Death ===
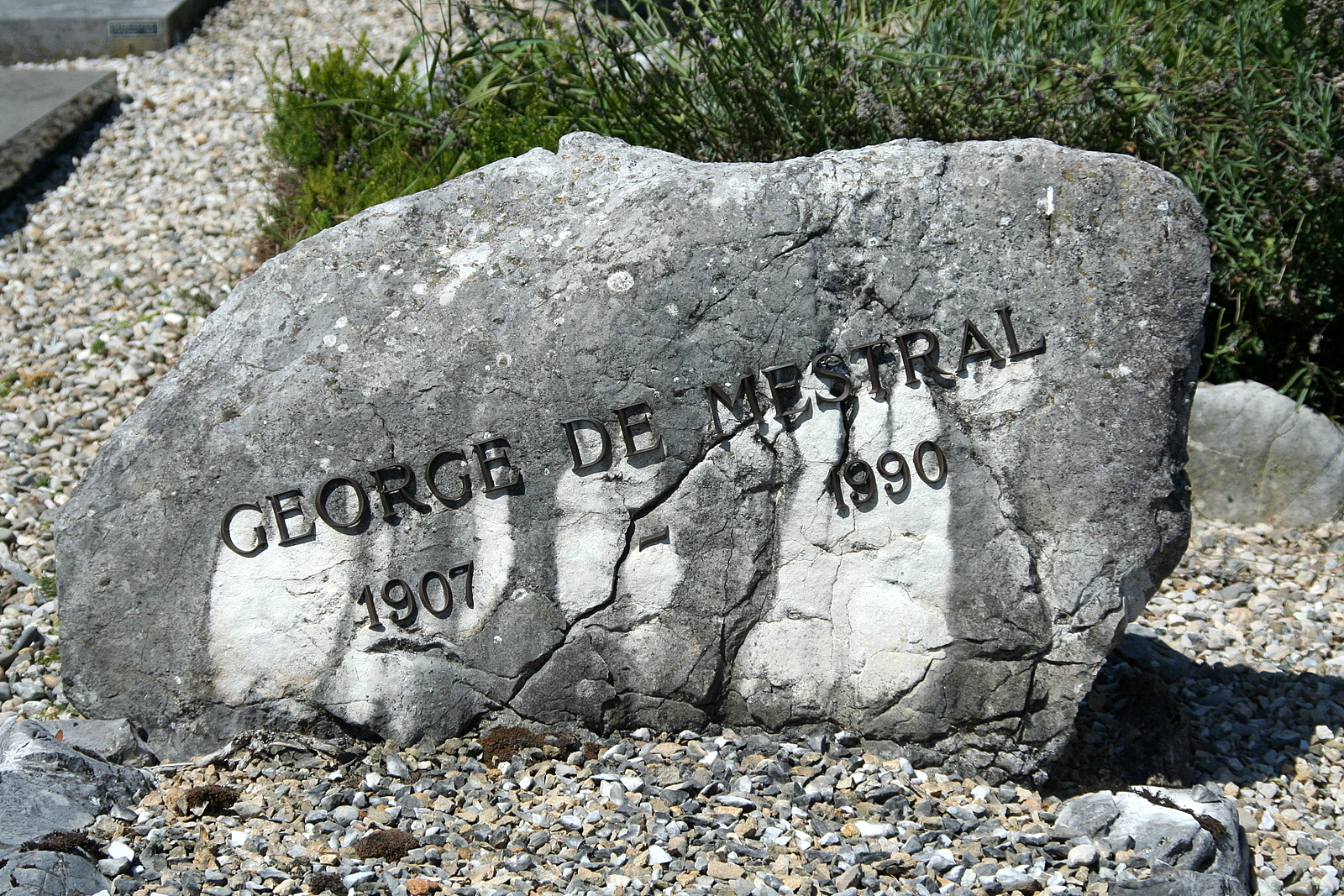
The grave in Commugny

De Mestral died in Commugny, Switzerland, where he is buried. The municipality posthumously named an avenue, L'avenue George de Mestral, in his honour.

== Honors and awards ==
He was inducted into the National Inventors Hall of Fame in 1999 for inventing hook and loop fasteners.

- He was made "Bourgeois d'Honneur" of Commugny.
- Honorary Member of the "Société Vaudoise des Ingénieurs et Architectes"
- Recipient of the French medal "Société d'Encouragement au Progrès"

== Invention of hook and loop ==
A microscopic view of a Burdock hook

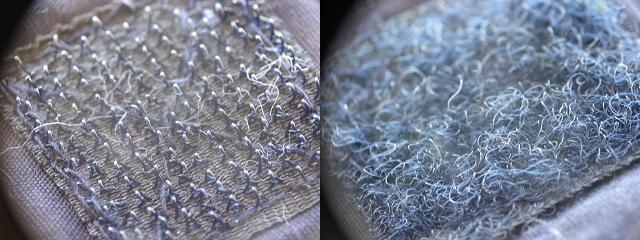
Velcro, the invention for which de Mestral is famous

De Mestral first conceptualised hook and loop after returning from a hunting trip with his dog in the Alps in 1941. After removing several of the burdock burrs (seeds) that kept sticking to his clothes and his dog's fur, he became curious as to how it worked. He examined them under a microscope, and noted hundreds of "hooks" that caught on anything with a loop, such as clothing, animal fur, or hair. He saw the possibility of binding two materials reversibly in a simple fashion, if he could figure out how to duplicate the hooks and loops.

Initially people refused to take him and his idea seriously. He took his idea to Lyon, which was then a centre of weaving, where he did manage to gain the help of one weaver, who made two cotton strips that worked. However, the cotton wore out quickly, so de Mestral turned to synthetic fibres. He settled on nylon as being the best synthetic after, through trial and error, he eventually discovered that nylon forms hooks that were perfect for the hook side of the fastener when sewn under hot infrared light. Though he had figured out how to make the hooks, he had yet to figure out a way to mechanise the process, and to make the looped side. Next he found that nylon thread, when woven in loops and heat-treated, retains its shape and is resilient, however, the loops had to be cut in just the right spot so that they could be fastened and unfastened many times. On the verge of giving up, a new idea came to him. He bought a pair of shears and trimmed the tops off the loops, thus creating hooks that would match up perfectly with the loops.

Mechanising the process of the weave of the hooks took eight years, and it took another year to create the loom that trimmed the loops after weaving them. In all, it took ten years to create a mechanised process that worked. He submitted his idea for patent in Switzerland in 1951 and the patent was granted in 1955. De Mestral expected a high demand immediately. After receiving patents, he subsequently opened shops in Germany, Switzerland, the United Kingdom, Sweden, Italy, the Netherlands, Belgium, and Canada. In 1957, he branched out to the textile centre of Manchester, New Hampshire in the United States.

De Mestral gave the name Velcro, a portmanteau of the French words velours ("velvet"), and crochet ("hook"), to his invention as well as his company, which continues to manufacture and market the fastening system.

However, hook and loop's integration into the textile industry took time, partly because of its appearance. Hook and loop in the early 1960s looked like it had been made from left-over bits of cheap fabric, an unappealing aspect for clothiers. The first notable use for Velcro® brand hook and loop came in the aerospace industry, where it helped astronauts manoeuvre in and out of bulky space suits. Eventually, skiers noted the similar advantages of a suit that was easier to get in and out of. Scuba and marine gear followed soon after.
