= Metaklett =

Fastening material made of steel

Metaklett (from German: Metall, "metal" and Klettband, "Velcro ribbon") is a fastening material made of steel that acts on a similar principle to conventional hook and loop fasteners. It was developed by Reinz-Dichtungs-GmbH, Technical University of Munich, Hölzel Stanz- und Feinwerktechnik GmbH & Co. KG and Koenig Verbindungstechnik GmbH. Metaklett is claimed to support shear strength 35 tonnes per square meter at temperatures up to 800 °C. It consists of two complementary strips of 0.2 mm thick perforated steel with catcher and holes. A second variant consists of two strips with protruding brushes and hooks. There is also a hybrid variant with one metal and one synthetic fleece ribbon.

In the context of the development Dr. Christoph Karl Hein compiled his dissertation "Systematic analysis to metallic hook-and-loop bondings".

== Sources ==
- Extreme steel 'Velcro' takes a 35-tonne load, New Scientist, 2009-09-04
- German-language website with technical and business details
- Systematische Untersuchungen zu metallischen Klettverbindungen - ISBN 978-3-89791-394-3
