= Aclens =

- Municipality
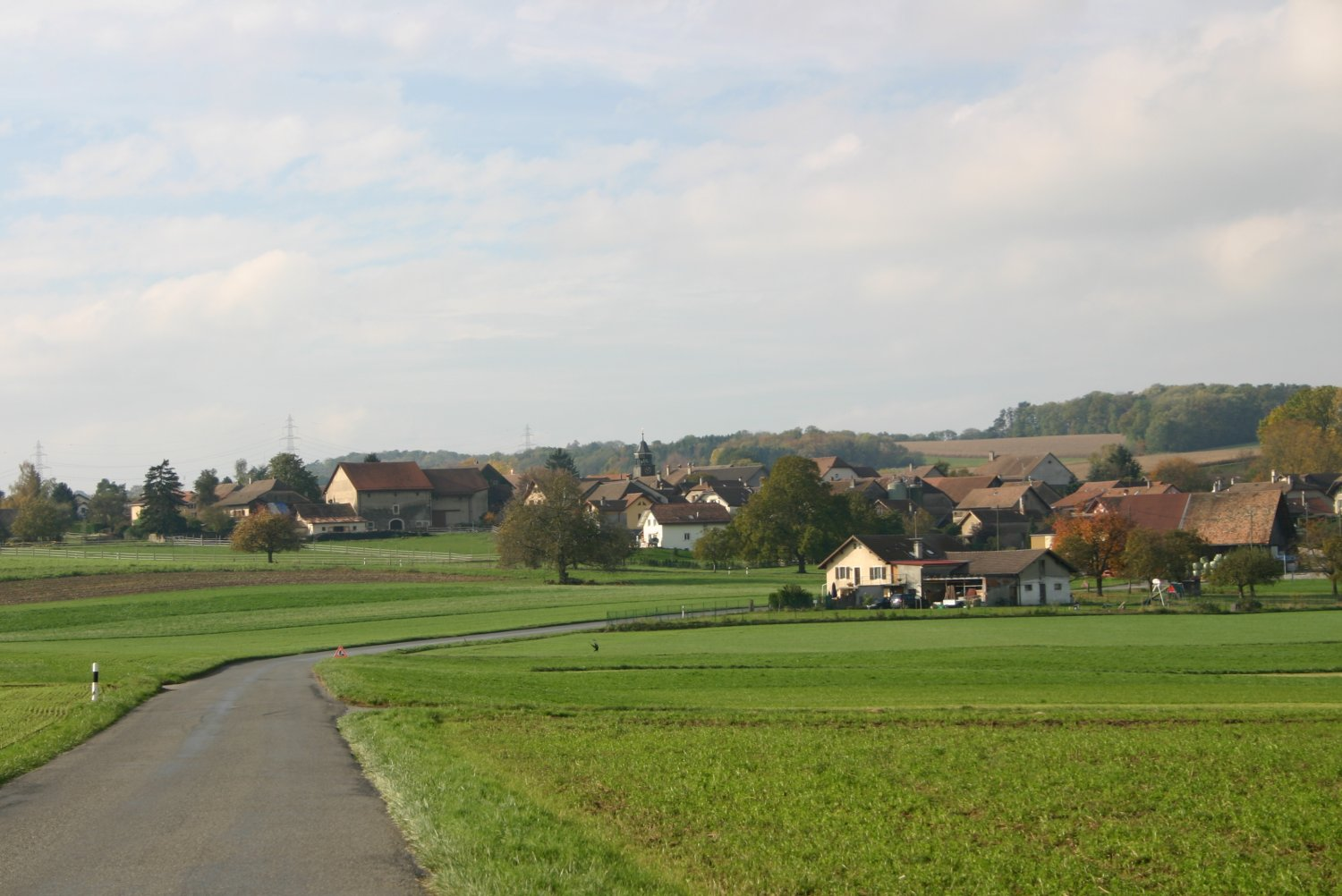
- Aclens

- Flag Coat of arms
- Location of Aclens
- Location within Switzerland Location within Canton of Vaud
- Coordinates: 46°34′N 06°31′E
- Country: Switzerland
- Canton: Vaud
- District: Morges

Government
  - Mayor: Syndic

Area
  - Total: 3.9 km^{2} (1.5 sq mi)
- Elevation: 461 m (1,512 ft)

Population (2003)
  - Total: 370
  - Density: 95/km^{2} (250/sq mi)
- Time zone: UTC+01:00 (CET)
  - Summer (DST): UTC+02:00 (CEST)
- Postal code: 1123
- SFOS number: 5621
- ISO 3166 code: CH-VD
- Surrounded by: Gollion, Vufflens-la-Ville, Bussigny-près-Lausanne, Bremblens, Romanel-sur-Morges, Saint-Saphorin-sur-Morges, Vullierens
- Website: www.aclens.ch

Aclens is a municipality in the Swiss canton of Vaud, located in the district of Morges.

== History ==
Aclens is first mentioned in 1002 as Astlegus.

== Geography ==
Aerial view (1964)

Aclens has an area, as of 2009, of 3.9 square kilometers (1.5 mi^{2}). Of this area, 2.68 km^{2} (1.03 mi^{2}) or 68.7% is used for agricultural purposes, while 0.53 km^{2} (0.20 mi^{2}) or 13.6% is forested. Of the rest of the land, 0.66 km^{2} (0.25 mi^{2}) or 16.9% is settled (buildings or roads), 0.01 km^{2} (2.5 acres) or 0.3% is either rivers or lakes and 0.02 km^{2} (4.9 acres) or 0.5% is unproductive land.

Of the built up area, industrial buildings made up 4.6% of the total area while housing and buildings made up 3.3% and transportation infrastructure made up 4.6%. Power and water infrastructure as well as other special developed areas made up 4.4% of the area Out of the forested land, all of the forested land area is covered with heavy forests. Of the agricultural land, 61.0% is used for growing crops and 4.1% is pastures, while 3.6% is used for orchards or vine crops. All the water in the municipality is flowing water.

The municipality was part of the old Morges District until it was dissolved on 31 August 2006, and Aclens became part of the new district of Morges.

The municipality is located on a high valley above the right bank of the Venoge river.

== Coat of arms ==
The blazon of the municipal coat of arms is Gules, a Fountain Gules and Argent fimbriated Argent, Chief of the same.

== Demographics ==
Aclens has a population (as of December 2020) of 531. As of 2008, 21.1% of the population are resident foreign nationals. Over the last 10 years (1999–2009 ) the population has changed at a rate of 27.5%. It has changed at a rate of 16.9% due to migration and at a rate of 10.3% due to births and deaths.

Most of the population (as of 2000) speaks French (323 or 89.0%), with German being second most common (22 or 6.1%) and Italian being third (6 or 1.7%).

Of the population in the municipality 99 or about 27.3% were born in Aclens and lived there in 2000. There were 134 or 36.9% who were born in the same canton, while 65 or 17.9% were born somewhere else in Switzerland, and 56 or 15.4% were born outside of Switzerland.

In 2008 there were 8 live births to Swiss citizens and 4 births to non-Swiss citizens, and in same time span there was 1 death of a Swiss citizen and 1 non-Swiss citizen death. Ignoring immigration and emigration, the population of Swiss citizens increased by 7 while the foreign population increased by 3. There was 1 Swiss man who emigrated from Switzerland. At the same time, there were 4 non-Swiss men and 6 non-Swiss women who immigrated from another country to Switzerland. The total Swiss population change in 2008 (from all sources, including moves across municipal borders) was an increase of 26 and the non-Swiss population increased by 15 people. This represents a population growth rate of 9.9%.

The age distribution, as of 2009, in Aclens is; 54 children or 11.8% of the population are between 0 and 9 years old and 52 teenagers or 11.4% are between 10 and 19. Of the adult population, 65 people or 14.2% of the population are between 20 and 29 years old. 76 people or 16.6% are between 30 and 39, 83 people or 18.1% are between 40 and 49, and 53 people or 11.6% are between 50 and 59. The senior population distribution is 32 people or 7.0% of the population are between 60 and 69 years old, 26 people or 5.7% are between 70 and 79, there are 16 people or 3.5% who are between 80 and 89, and there is 1 person who is 90 and older.

As of 2000, there were 150 people who were single and never married in the municipality. There were 181 married individuals, 11 widows or widowers and 21 individuals who are divorced.

As of 2000, there were 149 private households in the municipality, and an average of 2.4 persons per household. There were 47 households that consist of only one person and 8 households with five or more people. Out of a total of 154 households that answered this question, 30.5% were households made up of just one person. Of the rest of the households, there are 42 married couples without children, 48 married couples with children There were 10 single parents with a child or children. There were 2 households that were made up of unrelated people and 5 households that were made up of some sort of institution or another collective housing.

In 2000 there were 39 single family homes (or 40.2% of the total) out of a total of 97 inhabited buildings. There were 24 multi-family buildings (24.7%), along with 21 multi-purpose buildings that were mostly used for housing (21.6%) and 13 other use buildings (commercial or industrial) that also had some housing (13.4%). Of the single family homes 15 were built before 1919, while 5 were built between 1990 and 2000. The most multi-family homes (12) were built before 1919 and the next most (8) were built between 1971 and 1980. There were 2 multi-family houses built between 1996 and 2000.

In 2000 there were 165 apartments in the municipality. The most common apartment size was 4 rooms of which there were 50. There were 8 single room apartments and 37 apartments with five or more rooms. Of these apartments, a total of 136 apartments (82.4% of the total) were permanently occupied, while 27 apartments (16.4%) were seasonally occupied and 2 apartments (1.2%) were empty. As of 2009, the construction rate of new housing units was 0 new units per 1000 residents. The vacancy rate for the municipality, in 2010, was 0%.

The historical population is given in the following chart:

== Politics ==
In the 2007 federal election the most popular party was the SP which received 24.7% of the vote. The next three most popular parties were the Green Party (17.28%), the SVP (16.91%) and the FDP (13.35%). In the federal election, a total of 128 votes were cast, and the voter turnout was 50.0%.

== Economy ==
As of 2010, Aclens had an unemployment rate of 2.8%. As of 2008, there were 33 people employed in the primary economic sector and about 11 businesses involved in this sector. 234 people were employed in the secondary sector and there were 23 businesses in this sector. 932 people were employed in the tertiary sector, with 43 businesses in this sector. There were 196 residents of the municipality who were employed in some capacity, of which females made up 45.9% of the workforce.

In 2008 the total number of full-time equivalent jobs was 1,103. The number of jobs in the primary sector was 20, all of which were in agriculture. The number of jobs in the secondary sector was 228 of which 65 or (28.5%) were in manufacturing and 163 (71.5%) were in construction. The number of jobs in the tertiary sector was 855. In the tertiary sector; 134 or 15.7% were in wholesale or retail sales or the repair of motor vehicles, 680 or 79.5% were in the movement and storage of goods, 13 or 1.5% were in a hotel or restaurant, 22 or 2.6% were technical professionals or scientists, 2 or 0.2% were in education.

In 2000, there were 353 workers who commuted into the municipality and 131 workers who commuted away. The municipality is a net importer of workers, with about 2.7 workers entering the municipality for every one leaving. About 1.7% of the workforce coming into Aclens are coming from outside Switzerland. Of the working population, 9.7% used public transportation to get to work, and 63.8% used a private car.

== Religion ==
From the 2000 census, 101 or 27.8% were Roman Catholic, while 170 or 46.8% belonged to the Swiss Reformed Church. Of the rest of the population, there were 13 individuals (or about 3.58% of the population) who belonged to another Christian church. There were 10 (or about 2.75% of the population) who were Islamic. There were 1 individual who belonged to another church. 57 (or about 15.70% of the population) belonged to no church, are agnostic or atheist, and 17 individuals (or about 4.68% of the population) did not answer the question.

== Education ==
In Aclens about 142 or (39.1%) of the population have completed non-mandatory upper secondary education, and 48 or (13.2%) have completed additional higher education (either university or a Fachhochschule). Of the 48 who completed tertiary schooling, 56.3% were Swiss men, 35.4% were Swiss women.

In the 2009/2010 school year there were a total of 54 students in the Aclens school district. In the Vaud cantonal school system, two years of non-obligatory pre-school are provided by the political districts. During the school year, the political district provided pre-school care for a total of 631 children of which 203 children (32.2%) received subsidized pre-school care. The canton's primary school program requires students to attend for four years. There were 34 students in the municipal primary school program. The obligatory lower secondary school program lasts for six years and there were 20 students in those schools.

As of 2000, there were 11 students in Aclens who came from another municipality, while 60 residents attended schools outside the municipality.
