= Échichens =

- Municipality
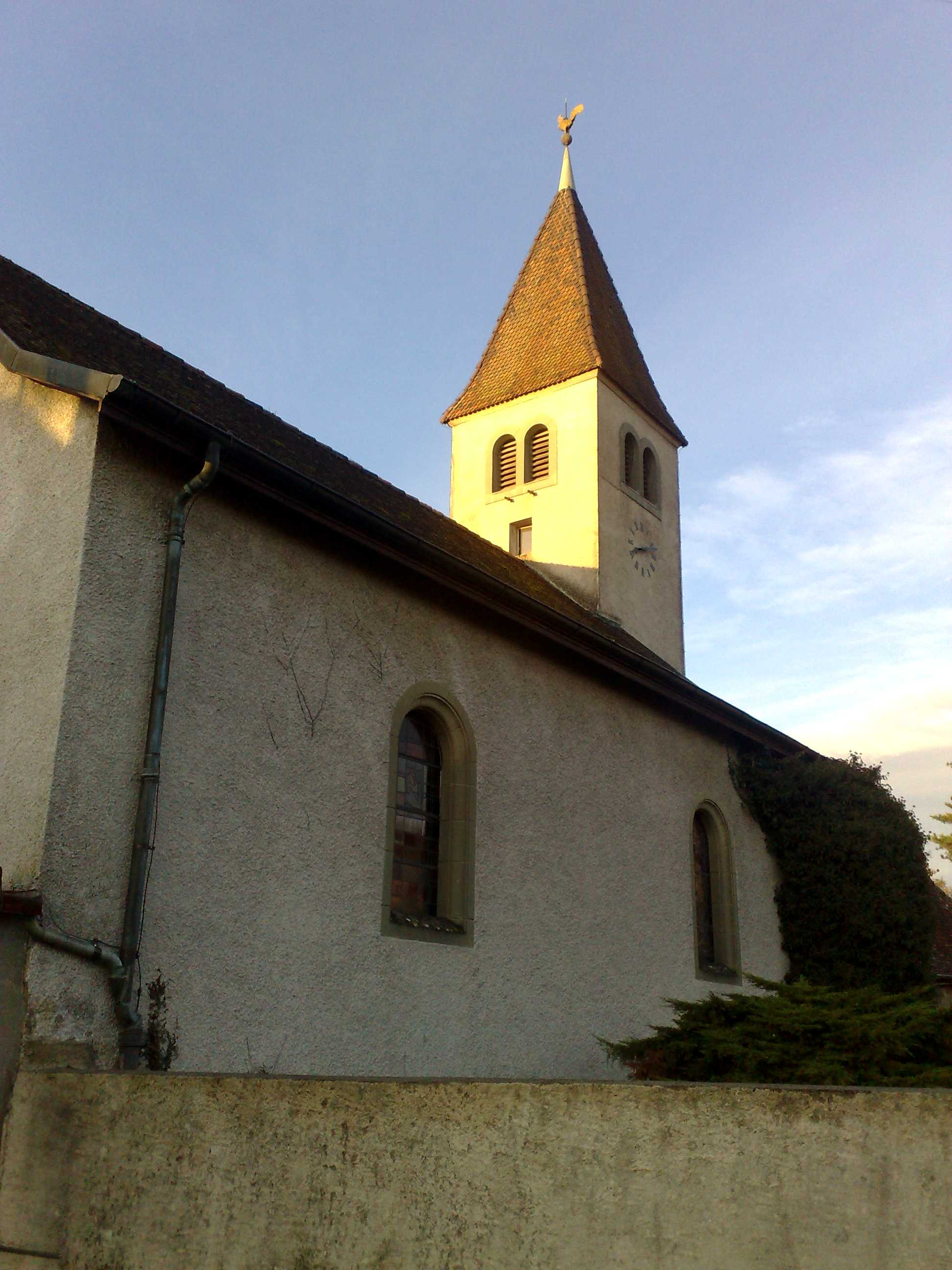
- Church of Saint-Saphorin-sur-Morges

- Flag Coat of arms
- Location of Échichens
- Location within Switzerland Location within Canton of Vaud
- Coordinates: 46°32′N 06°30′E
- Country: Switzerland
- Canton: Vaud
- District: Morges

Government
  - Mayor: Syndic; Philippe Jobin

Area
  - Total: 2.56 km^{2} (0.99 sq mi)
- Elevation: 466 m (1,529 ft)

Population (2003)
  - Total: 991
  - Density: 387/km^{2} (1,000/sq mi)
- Time zone: UTC+01:00 (CET)
  - Summer (DST): UTC+02:00 (CEST)
- Postal code: 1112
- SFOS number: 5634
- ISO 3166 code: CH-VD
- Surrounded by: Bremblens, Lonay, Monnaz, Morges, Saint-Saphorin-sur-Morges
- Twin towns: St-Fiacre-sur-Maine (France)
- Website: www.echichens.ch

Échichens (French pronunciation: [eʃiʃɑ̃]) is a municipality in the Swiss canton of Vaud, located in the district of Morges.

The municipalities of Colombier, Monnaz and Saint-Saphorin-sur-Morges merged on 1 July 2011 into the municipality of Échichens. People from Échichens are known as Échichanais (masculine) and Échichanaises (feminine) in French.

== History ==
Échichens is first mentioned in 1131 as Chichens. Colombier is first mentioned in 937 as Columbaris. Monnaz is first mentioned in 1200 as Monna. In 1221 it was mentioned as Muna. Saint-Saphorin-sur-Morges is first mentioned in 1171 as Sancti Simphoriani.

== Geography ==
Échichens has an area, as of 2009, of 2.6 square kilometers (1.0 mi^{2}). Of this area, 1.84 km^{2} (0.71 mi^{2}) or 71.3% is used for agricultural purposes, while 0.24 km^{2} (0.093 mi^{2}) or 9.3% is forested. Of the rest of the land, 0.55 km^{2} (0.21 mi^{2}) or 21.3% is settled (buildings or roads).

Of the built up area, housing and buildings made up 13.2% and transportation infrastructure made up 4.7%. while parks, green belts and sports fields made up 3.1%. Out of the forested land, 4.7% of the total land area is heavily forested and 4.7% is covered with orchards or small clusters of trees. Of the agricultural land, 46.9% is used for growing crops and 6.2% is pastures, while 18.2% is used for orchards or vine crops.

The municipality was part of the Morges District until it was dissolved on 31 August 2006, and Échichens became part of the new district of Morges.

The municipality is located on a vineyard covered hill above the Morges river and Lake Geneva. It consists of the village of Échichens and the hamlets of Joulens and Le Vernay.

== Coat of arms ==
Former coat of arms before merge

Before merge, the blazon of the municipal coat of arms was Azure, three ganders two and one Argent.

== Demographics ==
Échichens has a population (as of December 2020) of 3,127. As of 2008, 15.4% of the population are resident foreign nationals. Over the last 10 years (1999–2009) the population has changed at a rate of 0.4%. It has changed at a rate of 8.3% due to migration and at a rate of -8.1% due to births and deaths.

Most of the population (as of 2000) speaks French (997 or 89.1%), with German being second most common (44 or 3.9%) and Portuguese being third (22 or 2.0%). There are 11 people who speak Italian.

Of the population in the municipality 197 or about 17.6% were born in Échichens and lived there in 2000. There were 458 or 40.9% who were born in the same canton, while 212 or 18.9% were born somewhere else in Switzerland, and 212 or 18.9% were born outside of Switzerland.

In 2008 there were 7 live births to Swiss citizens and 4 births to non-Swiss citizens, and in same time span there were 21 deaths of Swiss citizens. Ignoring immigration and emigration, the population of Swiss citizens decreased by 14 while the foreign population increased by 4. There was 1 Swiss man and 2 Swiss women who emigrated from Switzerland. At the same time, there were 6 non-Swiss men and 6 non-Swiss women who immigrated from another country to Switzerland. The total Swiss population change in 2008 (from all sources, including moves across municipal borders) was a decrease of 1 and the non-Swiss population increased by 21 people. This represents a population growth rate of 2.0%.

The age distribution, as of 2009, in Échichens is; 98 children or 9.6% of the population are between 0 and 9 years old and 114 teenagers or 11.2% are between 10 and 19. Of the adult population, 99 people or 9.7% of the population are between 20 and 29 years old. 118 people or 11.6% are between 30 and 39, 159 people or 15.6% are between 40 and 49, and 151 people or 14.8% are between 50 and 59. The senior population distribution is 91 people or 8.9% of the population are between 60 and 69 years old, 84 people or 8.2% are between 70 and 79, there are 70 people or 6.9% who are between 80 and 89, and there are 37 people or 3.6% who are 90 and older.

As of 2000, there were 504 people who were single and never married in the municipality. There were 503 married individuals, 72 widows or widowers and 40 individuals who are divorced.

As of 2000, there were 357 private households in the municipality, and an average of 2.6 persons per household. There were 81 households that consist of only one person and 36 households with five or more people. Out of a total of 382 households that answered this question, 21.2% were households made up of just one person and there were 3 adults who lived with their parents. Of the rest of the households, there are 104 married couples without children, 148 married couples with children There were 13 single parents with a child or children. There were 8 households that were made up of unrelated people and 25 households that were made up of some sort of institution or another collective housing.

In 2000 there were 119 single family homes (or 54.3% of the total) out of a total of 219 inhabited buildings. There were 46 multi-family buildings (21.0%), along with 25 multi-purpose buildings that were mostly used for housing (11.4%) and 29 other use buildings (commercial or industrial) that also had some housing (13.2%). Of the single family homes 14 were built before 1919, while 10 were built between 1990 and 2000. The greatest number of single family homes (35) were built between 1981 and 1990. The most multi-family homes (11) were built between 1981 and 1990 and the next most (10) were built between 1961 and 1970. There were 3 multi-family houses built between 1996 and 2000.

In 2000 there were 391 apartments in the municipality. The most common apartment size was 4 rooms of which there were 131. There were 12 single room apartments and 141 apartments with five or more rooms. Of these apartments, a total of 330 apartments (84.4% of the total) were permanently occupied, while 51 apartments (13.0%) were seasonally occupied and 10 apartments (2.6%) were empty. As of 2009, the construction rate of new housing units was 0 new units per 1000 residents. The vacancy rate for the municipality, in 2010, was 0%.

== Historic population ==
The historical population is given in the following chart:

== Heritage sites of national significance ==
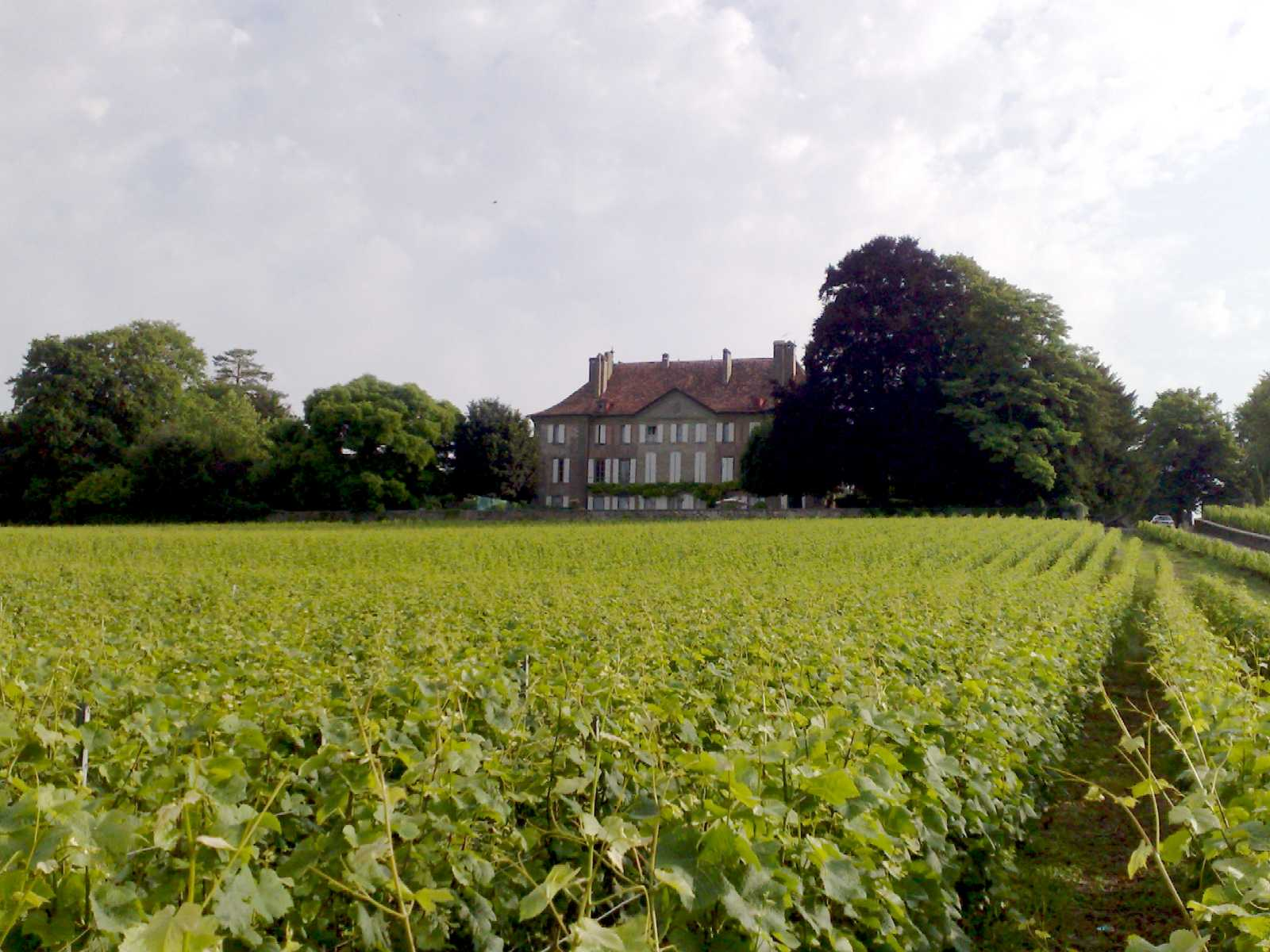
Mestral Castle

Mestral Castle is listed as a Swiss heritage site of national significance. The entire villages of Saint-Saphorin-sur-Morges and Colombier are part of the Inventory of Swiss Heritage Sites.

== Economy ==
As of 2010, Échichens had an unemployment rate of 3%. As of 2008, there were 33 people employed in the primary economic sector and about 8 businesses involved in this sector. 36 people were employed in the secondary sector and there were 6 businesses in this sector. 400 people were employed in the tertiary sector, with 21 businesses in this sector. There were 538 residents of the municipality who were employed in some capacity, of which females made up 42.0% of the workforce.

In 2008 the total number of full-time equivalent jobs was 328. The number of jobs in the primary sector was 17, all of which were in agriculture. The number of jobs in the secondary sector was 32 of which 18 or (56.3%) were in manufacturing and 14 (43.8%) were in construction. The number of jobs in the tertiary sector was 279. In the tertiary sector; 9 or 3.2% were in wholesale or retail sales or the repair of motor vehicles, 1 was in the movement and storage of goods, 5 or 1.8% were in a hotel or restaurant, 2 or 0.7% were in the information industry, 2 or 0.7% were the insurance or financial industry, 6 or 2.2% were technical professionals or scientists, 48 or 17.2% were in education and 202 or 72.4% were in health care.

In 2000, there were 248 workers who commuted into the municipality and 361 workers who commuted away. The municipality is a net exporter of workers, with about 1.5 workers leaving the municipality for every one entering. Of the working population, 13.6% used public transportation to get to work, and 55% used a private car.

== Religion ==
From the 2000 census, 329 or 29.4% were Roman Catholic, while 529 or 47.3% belonged to the Swiss Reformed Church. Of the rest of the population, there were 7 members of an Orthodox church (or about 0.63% of the population), and there were 147 individuals (or about 13.14% of the population) who belonged to another Christian church. There were 3 individuals (or about 0.27% of the population) who were Jewish, and 4 (or about 0.36% of the population) who were Islamic. There was 1 person who was Buddhist and 2 individuals who belonged to another church. 132 (or about 11.80% of the population) belonged to no church, are agnostic or atheist, and 38 individuals (or about 3.40% of the population) did not answer the question.

== Education ==
In Échichens about 334 or (29.8%) of the population have completed non-mandatory upper secondary education, and 229 or (20.5%) have completed additional higher education (either university or a Fachhochschule). Of the 229 who completed tertiary schooling, 48.0% were Swiss men, 31.9% were Swiss women, 11.4% were non-Swiss men and 8.7% were non-Swiss women.

In the 2009/2010 school year there were a total of 105 students in the Échichens school district. In the Vaud cantonal school system, two years of non-obligatory pre-school are provided by the political districts. During the school year, the political district provided pre-school care for a total of 631 children of which 203 children (32.2%) received subsidized pre-school care. The canton's primary school program requires students to attend for four years. There were 48 students in the municipal primary school program. The obligatory lower secondary school program lasts for six years and there were 56 students in those schools. There was also 1 student who was home schooled or attended another non-traditional school.

As of 2000, there were 26 students in Échichens who came from another municipality, while 130 residents attended schools outside the municipality.

== Sport ==
FC Echichens is the municipality's football team.
