= Échandens =

- Municipality
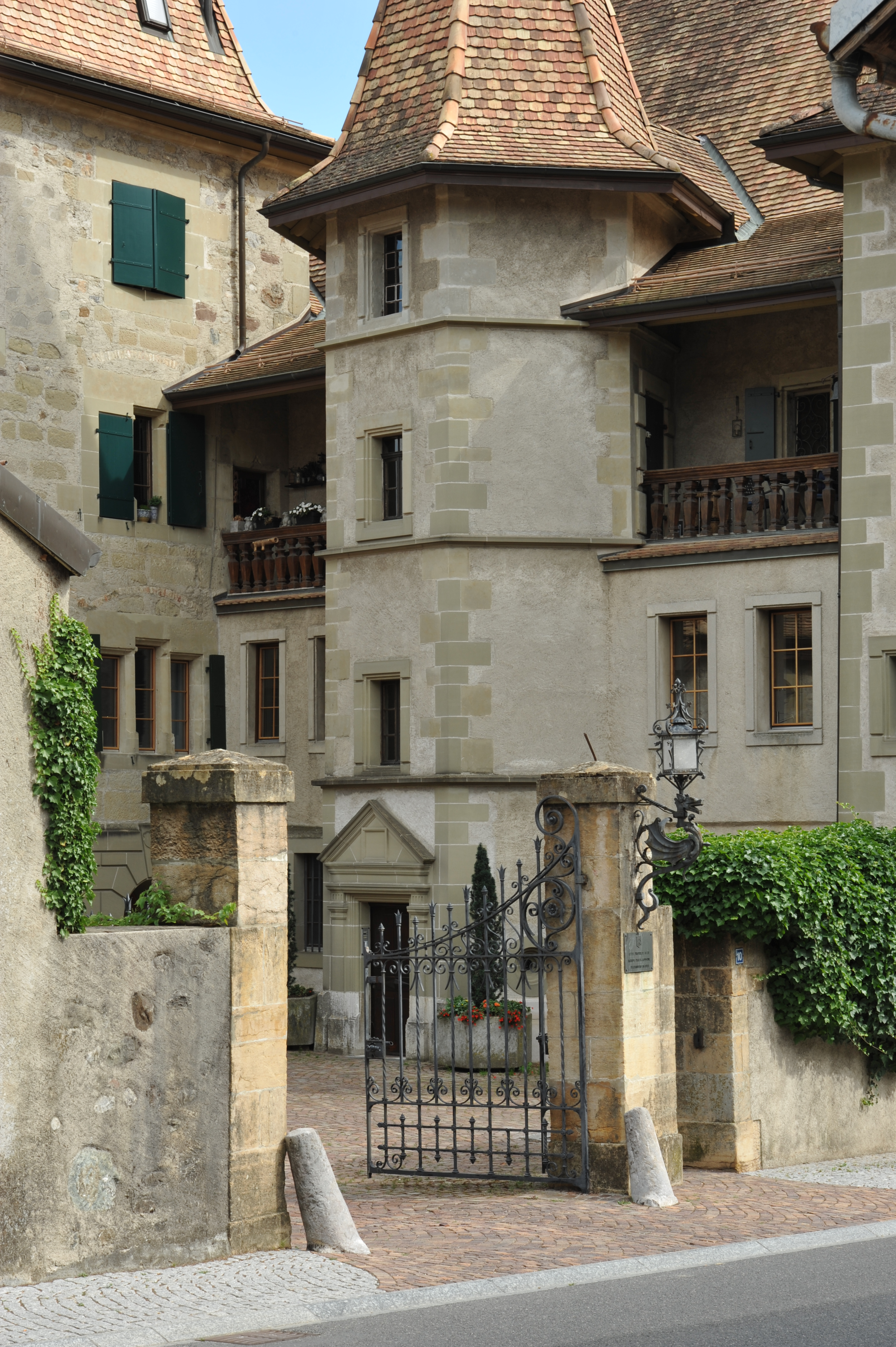
- Échandens Castle

- Flag Coat of arms
- Location of Échandens
- Location within Switzerland Location within Canton of Vaud
- Coordinates: 46°32′N 6°33′E
- Country: Switzerland
- Canton: Vaud
- District: Morges

Government
  - Mayor: Syndic; Jerome De Benedictis

Area
  - Total: 3.87 km^{2} (1.49 sq mi)
- Elevation: 432 m (1,417 ft)

Population (2003)
  - Total: 2,044
  - Density: 528/km^{2} (1,370/sq mi)
- Time zone: UTC+01:00 (CET)
  - Summer (DST): UTC+02:00 (CEST)
- Postal code: 1026
- SFOS number: 5633
- ISO 3166 code: CH-VD
- Surrounded by: Bremblens, Bussigny-près-Lausanne, Denges, Écublens, Lonay
- Website: www.echandens.ch

Échandens (French pronunciation: [eʃɑ̃dɑ̃]) is a municipality in the district of Morges of the canton of Vaud, Switzerland.

== History ==
Échandens is first mentioned in 1164 as Scandens.

== Geography ==
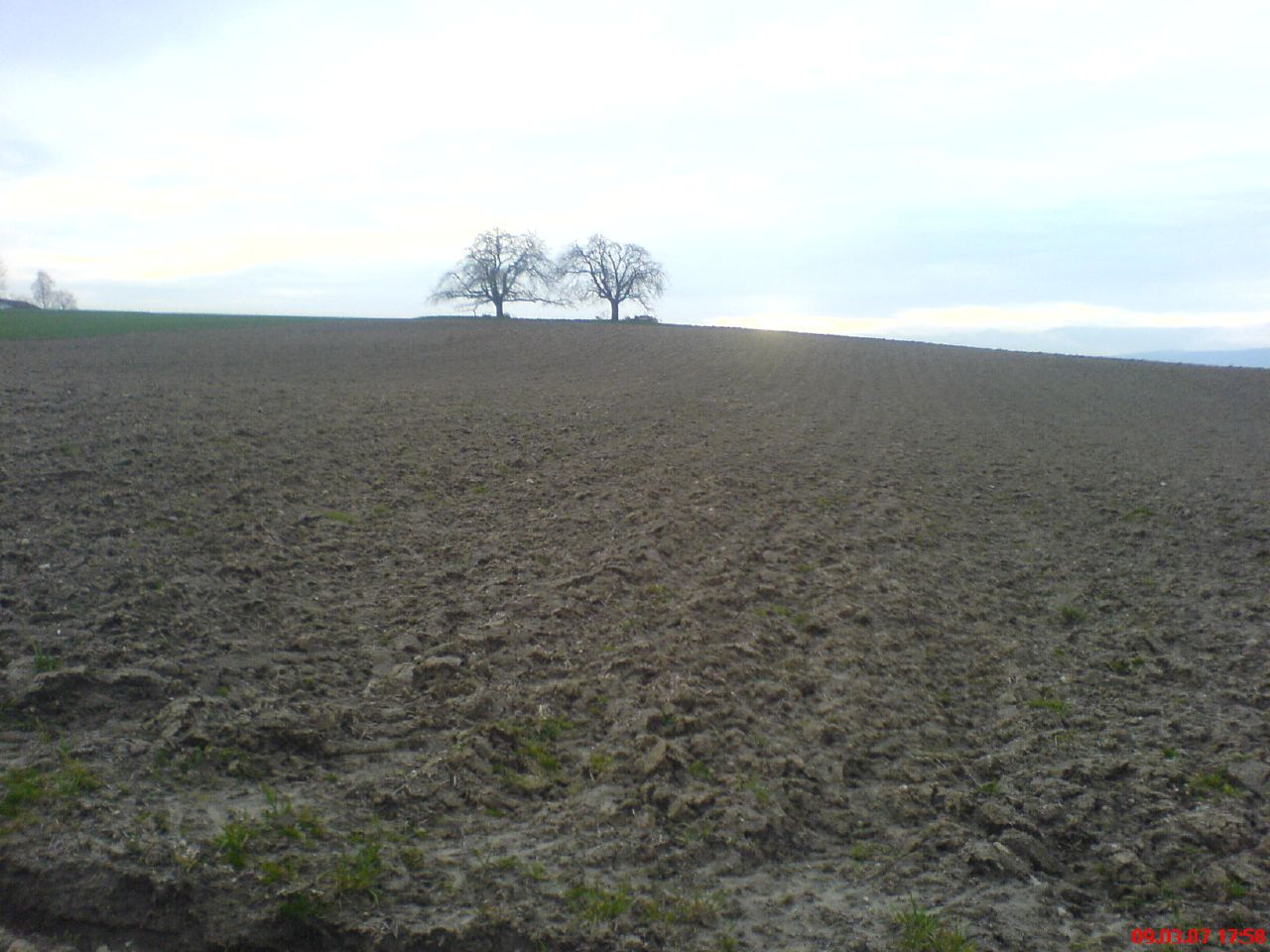
Fields outside Échandens

Échandens has an area, as of 2009, of 3.9 square kilometers (1.5 mi^{2}). Of this area, 2.03 km^{2} (0.78 mi^{2}) or 52.3% is used for agricultural purposes, while 0.7 km^{2} (0.27 mi^{2}) or 18.0% is forested. Of the rest of the land, 1.13 km^{2} (0.44 mi^{2}) or 29.1% is settled (buildings or roads), 0.03 km^{2} (7.4 acres) or 0.8% is either rivers or lakes.

Of the built up area, industrial buildings made up 3.6% of the total area while housing and buildings made up 13.9% and transportation infrastructure made up 8.5%. while parks, green belts and sports fields made up 2.3%. Out of the forested land, 15.7% of the total land area is heavily forested and 2.3% is covered with orchards or small clusters of trees. Of the agricultural land, 42.0% is used for growing crops, while 9.3% is used for orchards or vine crops. All the water in the municipality is flowing water.

The municipality was part of the Morges District until it was dissolved on 31 August 2006, and Échandens became part of the new district of Morges.

It consists of the village of Échandens and the hamlet of Les Abbesses.

== Coat of arms ==
The blazon of the municipal coat of arms is Gules, two Chevrons Argent.

== Demographics ==
Échandens has a population (as of December 2020) of 2,735. As of 2008, 17.1% of the population are resident foreign nationals. Over the last 10 years (1999–2009 ) the population has changed at a rate of 2.8%. It has changed at a rate of -1.2% due to migration and at a rate of 3.9% due to births and deaths.

Most of the population (as of 2000) speaks French (1,804 or 86.5%), with German being second most common (121 or 5.8%) and Italian being third (40 or 1.9%). There is 1 person who speaks Romansh.

Of the population in the municipality 388 or about 18.6% were born in Échandens and lived there in 2000. There were 875 or 42.0% who were born in the same canton, while 388 or 18.6% were born somewhere else in Switzerland, and 386 or 18.5% were born outside of Switzerland.

In 2008 there were 10 live births to Swiss citizens and 2 births to non-Swiss citizens, and in same time span there were 11 deaths of Swiss citizens and 1 non-Swiss citizen death. Ignoring immigration and emigration, the population of Swiss citizens decreased by 1 while the foreign population increased by 1. There were 6 Swiss men and 1 Swiss woman who emigrated from Switzerland. At the same time, there were 12 non-Swiss men and 3 non-Swiss women who immigrated from another country to Switzerland. The total Swiss population change in 2008 (from all sources, including moves across municipal borders) was a decrease of 6 and the non-Swiss population increased by 12 people. This represents a population growth rate of 0.3%.

The age distribution, as of 2009, in Échandens is; 196 children or 9.2% of the population are between 0 and 9 years old and 262 teenagers or 12.3% are between 10 and 19. Of the adult population, 220 people or 10.3% of the population are between 20 and 29 years old. 261 people or 12.2% are between 30 and 39, 320 people or 15.0% are between 40 and 49, and 291 people or 13.6% are between 50 and 59. The senior population distribution is 329 people or 15.4% of the population are between 60 and 69 years old, 182 people or 8.5% are between 70 and 79, there are 67 people or 3.1% who are between 80 and 89, and there are 9 people or 0.4% who are 90 and older.

As of 2000, there were 810 people who were single and never married in the municipality. There were 1,068 married individuals, 77 widows or widowers and 130 individuals who are divorced.

As of 2000, there were 828 private households in the municipality, and an average of 2.5 persons per household. There were 211 households that consist of only one person and 59 households with five or more people. Out of a total of 853 households that answered this question, 24.7% were households made up of just one person and there were 3 adults who lived with their parents. Of the rest of the households, there are 253 married couples without children, 310 married couples with children. There were 38 single parents with a child or children. There were 13 households that were made up of unrelated people and 25 households that were made up of some sort of institution or another collective housing.

In 2000 there were 355 single family homes (or 71.0% of the total) out of a total of 500 inhabited buildings. There were 89 multi-family buildings (17.8%), along with 37 multi-purpose buildings that were mostly used for housing (7.4%) and 19 other use buildings (commercial or industrial) that also had some housing (3.8%). Of the single family homes 19 were built before 1919, while 31 were built between 1990 and 2000. The greatest number of single family homes (139) were built between 1971 and 1980. The most multi-family homes (22) were built between 1961 and 1970 and the next most (21) were built between 1971 and 1980. There was 1 multi-family house built between 1996 and 2000.

In 2000 there were 867 apartments in the municipality. The most common apartment size was 4 rooms of which there were 231. There were 35 single room apartments and 321 apartments with five or more rooms. Of these apartments, a total of 806 apartments (93.0% of the total) were permanently occupied, while 40 apartments (4.6%) were seasonally occupied and 21 apartments (2.4%) were empty. As of 2009, the construction rate of new housing units was 6.1 new units per 1000 residents. The vacancy rate for the municipality, in 2010, was 0.55%.

The historical population is given in the following chart:

== Politics ==
In the 2007 federal election the most popular party was the SVP which received 22.16% of the vote. The next three most popular parties were the FDP (17.33%), the SP (16.99%) and the Green Party (15.34%). In the federal election, a total of 704 votes were cast, and the voter turnout was 51.7%.

== Economy ==
As of 2010, Échandens had an unemployment rate of 3%. As of 2008, there were 54 people employed in the primary economic sector and about 8 businesses involved in this sector. 456 people were employed in the secondary sector and there were 38 businesses in this sector. 591 people were employed in the tertiary sector, with 102 businesses in this sector. There were 1,101 residents of the municipality who were employed in some capacity, of which females made up 42.9% of the workforce.

In 2008 the total number of full-time equivalent jobs was 969. The number of jobs in the primary sector was 30, all of which were in agriculture. The number of jobs in the secondary sector was 440 of which 72 or (16.4%) were in manufacturing and 368 (83.6%) were in construction. The number of jobs in the tertiary sector was 499. In the tertiary sector; 260 or 52.1% were in wholesale or retail sales or the repair of motor vehicles, 12 or 2.4% were in the movement and storage of goods, 22 or 4.4% were in a hotel or restaurant, 15 or 3.0% were in the information industry, 7 or 1.4% were the insurance or financial industry, 43 or 8.6% were technical professionals or scientists, 1 was in education and 3 or 0.6% were in health care.

In 2000, there were 775 workers who commuted into the municipality and 881 workers who commuted away. The municipality is a net exporter of workers, with about 1.1 workers leaving the municipality for every one entering. About 2.1% of the workforce coming into Échandens are coming from outside Switzerland. Of the working population, 14.4% used public transportation to get to work, and 66.8% used a private car.

== Religion ==
From the 2000 census, 575 or 27.6% were Roman Catholic, while 1,106 or 53.0% belonged to the Swiss Reformed Church. Of the rest of the population, there were 22 members of an Orthodox church (or about 1.06% of the population), and there were 76 individuals (or about 3.65% of the population) who belonged to another Christian church. There were 9 individuals (or about 0.43% of the population) who were Jewish, and 12 (or about 0.58% of the population) who were Islamic. 243 (or about 11.65% of the population) belonged to no church, are agnostic or atheist, and 79 individuals (or about 3.79% of the population) did not answer the question.

== Education ==
In Échandens about 832 or (39.9%) of the population have completed non-mandatory upper secondary education, and 379 or (18.2%) have completed additional higher education (either university or a Fachhochschule). Of the 379 who completed tertiary schooling, 56.5% were Swiss men, 28.8% were Swiss women, 10.0% were non-Swiss men and 4.7% were non-Swiss women.

In the 2009/2010 school year there were a total of 233 students in the Échandens school district. In the Vaud cantonal school system, two years of non-obligatory pre-school are provided by the political districts. During the school year, the political district provided pre-school care for a total of 631 children of which 203 children (32.2%) received subsidized pre-school care. The canton's primary school program requires students to attend for four years. There were 112 students in the municipal primary school program. The obligatory lower secondary school program lasts for six years and there were 119 students in those schools. There were also 2 students who were home schooled or attended another non-traditional school.

As of 2000, there were 38 students in Échandens who came from another municipality, while 201 residents attended schools outside the municipality.
