= Saint-Saphorin-sur-Morges =

- Former municipality
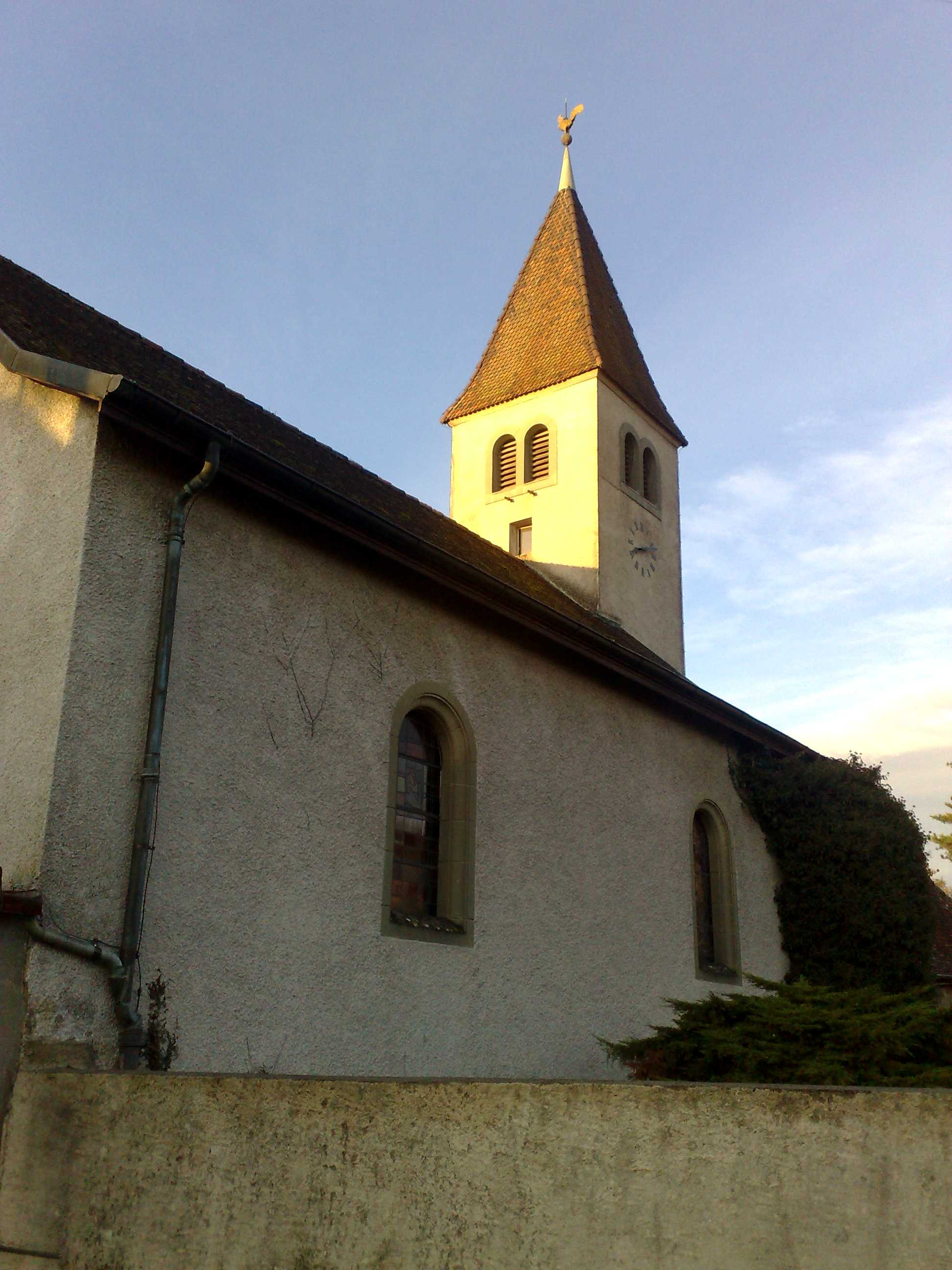
- Church of Saint-Saphorin-sur-Morges

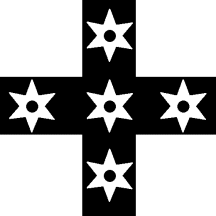
- Flag Coat of arms
- Location of Saint-Saphorin-sur-Morges
- Location within Switzerland Location within Canton of Vaud
- Coordinates: 46°33′N 06°29′E
- Country: Switzerland
- Canton: Vaud
- District: Morges

Government
  - Mayor: Daniel Charbon

Area
  - Total: 3.85 km^{2} (1.49 sq mi)
- Elevation: 530 m (1,740 ft)

Population (2009)
  - Total: 453
  - Density: 118/km^{2} (305/sq mi)
- Time zone: UTC+01:00 (CET)
  - Summer (DST): UTC+02:00 (CEST)
- Postal code: 1113
- SFOS number: 5647
- ISO 3166 code: CH-VD
- Surrounded by: Aclens, Bremblens, Colombier, Echichens, Monnaz, Romanel-sur-Morges, Vullierens
- Website: Profile (in French), SFSO statistics

Saint-Saphorin-sur-Morges is a former municipality in the Swiss canton of Vaud, located in the district of Morges.

The villages of Colombier, Monnaz and Saint-Saphorin-sur-Morges merged on 1 July 2011 into the municipality of Echichens.

== History ==
Saint-Saphorin-sur-Morges is first mentioned in 1171 as Sancti Simphoriani.

== Geography ==
Saint-Saphorin-sur-Morges has an area, as of 2009, of 3.8 square kilometers (1.5 mi^{2}). Of this area, 3.36 km^{2} (1.30 mi^{2}) or 88.7% is used for agricultural purposes, while 0.17 km^{2} (0.066 mi^{2}) or 4.5% is forested. Of the rest of the land, 0.27 km^{2} (0.10 mi^{2}) or 7.1% is settled (buildings or roads).

Of the built up area, housing and buildings made up 4.7% and transportation infrastructure made up 2.4%. Out of the forested land, 2.6% of the total land area is heavily forested and 1.8% is covered with orchards or small clusters of trees. Of the agricultural land, 80.2% is used for growing crops and 4.0% is pastures, while 4.5% is used for orchards or vine crops.

The village is located in a high valley between the Venoge and the Morges rivers.

== Coat of arms ==
The blazon of the municipal coat of arms is Argent, on a Cross Sable five Mullets of Six pierced of the first.

== Demographics ==
Saint-Saphorin-sur-Morges had a population (as of 2009) of 453. As of 2008, 13.0% of the population are resident foreign nationals. Over the last 10 years (1999–2009 ) the population has changed at a rate of 22.8%. It has changed at a rate of 17.3% due to migration and at a rate of 4.9% due to births and deaths.

Most of the population (as of 2000) speaks French (344 or 90.3%), with German being second most common (13 or 3.4%) and Swedish being third (6 or 1.6%). There are 2 people who speak Italian and 3 people who speak Romansh.

Of the population in the village 94 or about 24.7% were born in Saint-Saphorin-sur-Morges and lived there in 2000. There were 171 or 44.9% who were born in the same canton, while 54 or 14.2% were born somewhere else in Switzerland, and 50 or 13.1% were born outside of Switzerland.

In 2008 there were 0 live births to Swiss citizens or resident non-citizens. Ignoring immigration and emigration, the population of Swiss citizens remained the same while the foreign population remained the same. There were 3 Swiss men and 1 Swiss woman who emigrated from Switzerland. At the same time, there was 1 non-Swiss man and 1 non-Swiss woman who immigrated from another country to Switzerland. The total Swiss population change in 2008 (from all sources, including moves across municipal borders) was an increase of 11 and the non-Swiss population increased by 4 people. This represents a population growth rate of 3.7%.

The age distribution of the population (as of 2000) is children and teenagers (0–19 years old) make up 32.3% of the population, while adults (20–64 years old) make up 57% and seniors (over 64 years old) make up 10.8%.

As of 2000, there were 157 people who were single and never married in the village. There were 204 married individuals, 13 widows or widowers and 7 individuals who are divorced.

As of 2000 the average number of residents per living room was 0.59 which is about equal to the cantonal average of 0.61 per room. In this case, a room is defined as space of a housing unit of at least 4 m^{2} (43 sq ft) as normal bedrooms, dining rooms, living rooms, kitchens and habitable cellars and attics. About 54.6% of the total households were owner occupied, or in other words did not pay rent (though they may have a mortgage or a rent-to-own agreement).

As of 2000, there were 135 private households in the village, and an average of 2.8 persons per household. There were 28 households that consist of only one person and 16 households with five or more people. Out of a total of 135 households that answered this question, 20.7% were households made up of just one person and there were 2 adults who lived with their parents. Of the rest of the households, there are 36 married couples without children, 66 married couples with children There were 3 single parents with a child or children.

In 2000 there were 52 single family homes (or 54.2% of the total) out of a total of 96 inhabited buildings. There were 21 multi-family buildings (21.9%), along with 18 multi-purpose buildings that were mostly used for housing (18.8%) and 5 other use buildings (commercial or industrial) that also had some housing (5.2%). Of the single family homes 9 were built before 1919, while 23 were built between 1990 and 2000. The most multi-family homes (12) were built before 1919 and the next most (2) were built between 1919 and 1945. There was 1 multi-family house built between 1996 and 2000.

In 2000 there were 136 apartments in the village. The most common apartment size was 4 rooms of which there were 34. There were single room apartments and 67 apartments with five or more rooms. Of these apartments, a total of 130 apartments (95.6% of the total) were permanently occupied, while 3 apartments (2.2%) were seasonally occupied and 3 apartments (2.2%) were empty. As of 2009, the construction rate of new housing units was 19.9 new units per 1000 residents. The vacancy rate for the village, in 2010, was 4.71%.

The historical population is given in the following chart:

== Heritage sites of national significance ==
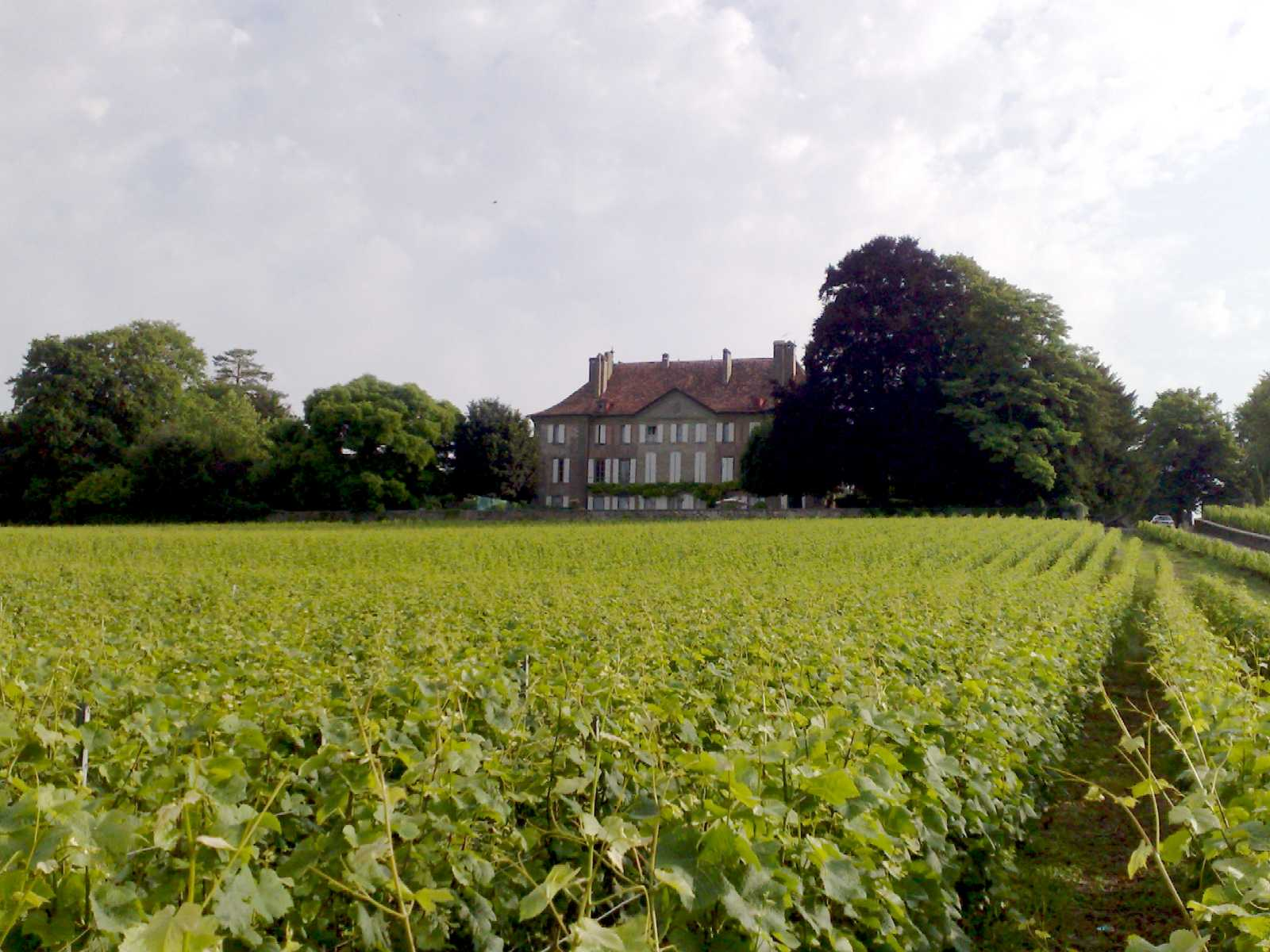
Mestral Castle.

Mestral Castle is listed as a Swiss heritage site of national significance. The entire village of Saint-Saphorin-sur-Morges is part of the Inventory of Swiss Heritage Sites.

== Politics ==
In the 2007 federal election the most popular party was the SVP which received 37.1% of the vote. The next three most popular parties were the LPS Party (14.53%), the SP (13.74%) and the FDP (13.46%). In the federal election, a total of 121 votes were cast, and the voter turnout was 49.2%.

== Economy ==
As of 2010, Saint-Saphorin-sur-Morges had an unemployment rate of 1.2%. As of 2008, there were 31 people employed in the primary economic sector and about 15 businesses involved in this sector. 8 people were employed in the secondary sector and there was 1 business in this sector. 17 people were employed in the tertiary sector, with 8 businesses in this sector. There were 169 residents of the village who were employed in some capacity, of which females made up 41.4% of the workforce.

In 2008 the total number of full-time equivalent jobs was 37. The number of jobs in the primary sector was 18, all of which were in agriculture. The number of jobs in the secondary sector was 7, all of which were in manufacturing. The number of jobs in the tertiary sector was 12. In the tertiary sector; 1 was in the sale or repair of motor vehicles, 3 or 25.0% were in a hotel or restaurant, 2 or 16.7% were in the information industry, 1 was a technical professional or scientist, 3 or 25.0% were in education.

In 2000, there were 12 workers who commuted into the village and 142 workers who commuted away. The village is a net exporter of workers, with about 11.8 workers leaving the village for every one entering. Of the working population, 10.1% used public transportation to get to work, and 75.1% used a private car.

== Religion ==
From the 2000 census, 87 or 22.8% were Roman Catholic, while 211 or 55.4% belonged to the Swiss Reformed Church. Of the rest of the population, there were 2 members of an Orthodox church (or about 0.52% of the population), and there were 24 individuals (or about 6.30% of the population) who belonged to another Christian church. There were 2 individuals (or about 0.52% of the population) who were Jewish, and there was 1 individual who was Islamic. 33 (or about 8.66% of the population) belonged to no church, are agnostic or atheist, and 33 individuals (or about 8.66% of the population) did not answer the question.

== Education ==
In Saint-Saphorin-sur-Morges about 123 or (32.3%) of the population have completed non-mandatory upper secondary education, and 83 or (21.8%) have completed additional higher education (either University or a Fachhochschule). Of the 83 who completed tertiary schooling, 45.8% were Swiss men, 28.9% were Swiss women, 18.1% were non-Swiss men and 7.2% were non-Swiss women.

As of 2000, there were 14 students in Saint-Saphorin-sur-Morges who came from another village, while 56 residents attended schools outside the village.
