= Dorigny =

Dorigny may refer to:

== Surname ==
- Michel Dorigny (1617-1663), French painter and engraver, father of Nicolas and Louis (Ludovico) Dorigny
- Ludovico Dorigny (1654-1742), French painter and engraver
- Nicolas Dorigny (1658-1746), French engraver

== Places ==
- Dorigny, name of the place where the main campuses of the University of Lausanne (UNIL) and the Swiss Federal Institute of Technology in Lausanne (EPFL) are located. See Lausanne campus.
  - Quartier Dorigny, one of the five areas of the main campus of the University of Lausanne served by the Lausanne Metro line 1 from UNIL-Dorigny station
  - Grange de Dorigny, the theatre of the University of Lausanne
  - Ferme de Dorigny ("Farm of Dorigny"), a building of the University of Lausanne, home of the Jean Monnet Foundation for Europe
  - Château de Dorigny ("Castle of Dorigny"), a building of the University of Lausanne
- Mont-d'Origny in northern France
