= Écublens, Vaud =

Écublens
- Municipality
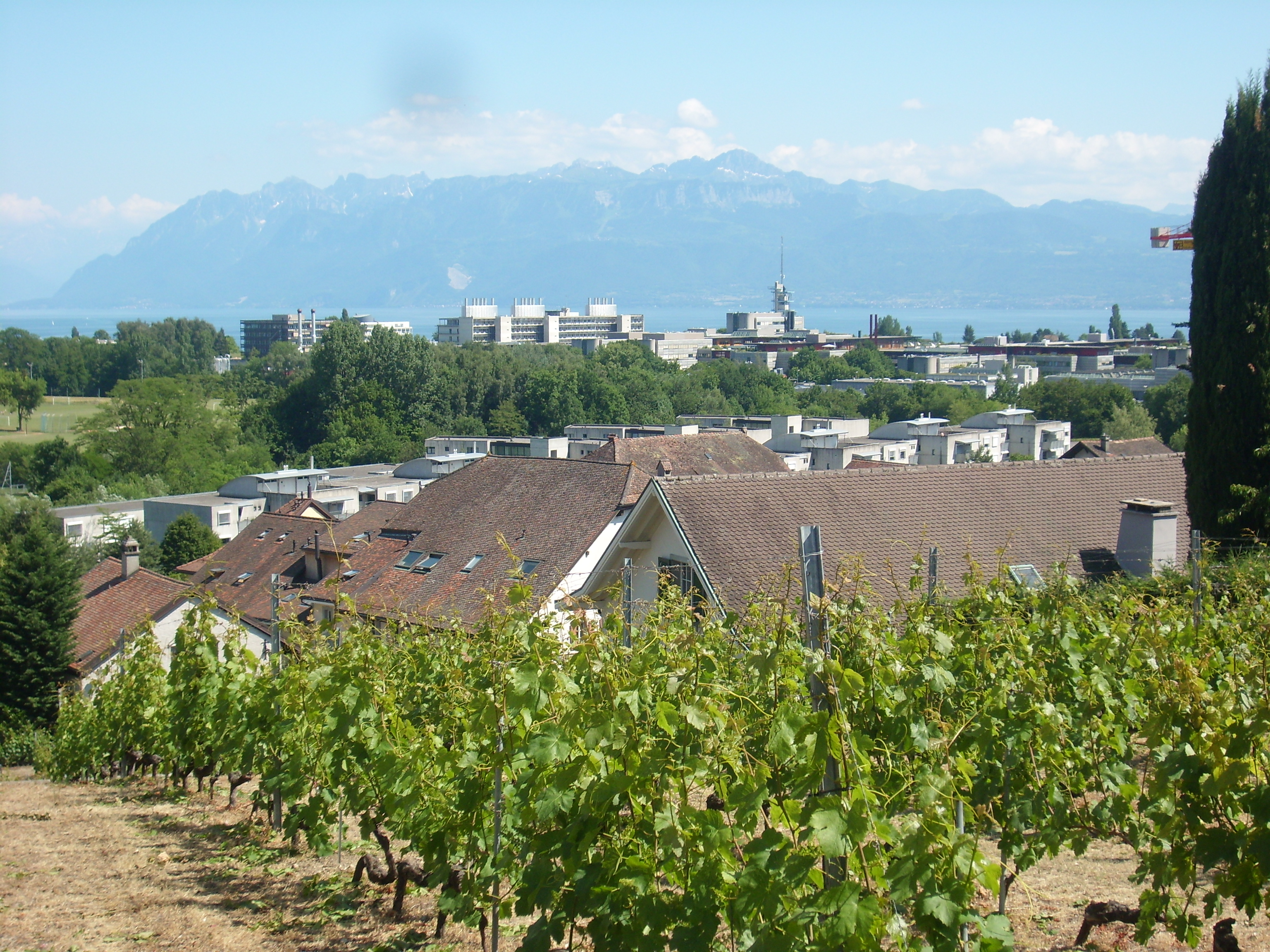
- Écublens

- Flag Coat of arms
- Location of Écublens
- Location within Switzerland Location within Canton of Vaud
- Coordinates: 46°32′N 06°34′E
- Country: Switzerland
- Canton: Vaud
- District: Ouest Lausannois

Government
  - Mayor: Syndic; Christian Maeder

Area
  - Total: 5.71 km^{2} (2.20 sq mi)
- Elevation: 428 m (1,404 ft)

Population (2003)
  - Total: 10,013
  - Density: 1,750/km^{2} (4,540/sq mi)
- Time zone: UTC+01:00 (CET)
  - Summer (DST): UTC+02:00 (CEST)
- Postal code: 1024
- SFOS number: 5635
- ISO 3166 code: CH-VD
- Surrounded by: Bussigny-près-Lausanne, Chavannes-près-Renens, Crissier, Denges, Échandens, Lausanne, Renens, Saint-Sulpice
- Website: www.ecublens.ch

Écublens (French pronunciation: [ekyblɑ̃]) is a municipality in Switzerland in the canton of Vaud, located in the district of Ouest Lausannois. It is a suburb of Lausanne and is served by the Lausanne metro line 1 and several bus lines. The nearest train station is Renens.

== History ==
A Hallstatt era grave was discovered in Dorigny. Three Bronze Age graves were found in Valeyre and several La Tène culture graves have been found in Bassenges and Valeyre. A motte (a raised earthen, fortified hill) of an unknown age is found at a place in the municipality which is known as Chateau-de-la-Motte. A connection between the motte and nearby Roman era artifacts has not been established.

Écublens is first mentioned around 958-59 as in villa Escublens. In 964 it was mentioned as Scubilingis in a document recording the property of the cathedral of Lausanne. This document mentions that Scubilingis is situated near Renens.

In the 10th century Écublens was part of the territory of Renens. Under Bernese rule it was part of the bailiwick of Lausanne and was administered by that court. In 1156, a chapel was built in Écublens which was under the authority of the Priory of Saint-Sulpice. In 1228 the parish church of St. Peter is first mentioned. By 1453 the parish church was again under the authority of the church of Saint-Sulpice.

On 9 May 1476, Charles the Bold, the Duke of Burgundy, gathered his army in Écublens after his defeat at the Battle of Grandson, in preparation for the Battle of Morat. The area was under the Bernese Occupation from 1536 until 1798, when French troops arrived. On 12 May 1800, Napoleon inspected two divisions of his troops in Écublens on his way to the Great St Bernard Pass during his Italian campaign of 1800.

After the Protestant Reformation included the parish of Écublens was created, which included Saint-Sulpice and the village of Chavannes. They remained part of the parish until 1966.

In 1803 it was made the district capital. In 1909 the General Council was replaced by a local council.

During World War II a small aerodrome was operated in Écublens. As part of the nation's planning for post-war development of aviation, Lausanne planned to expand this facility into one of five regional airports forming a second-tier of airports in the country. This development would permit the disposal of the nearby Blécherett Aerodrome as that location was deemed to be unfeasible for expansion. This plan was not fulfilled, and the Écublens aerodrome fell into disuse. There was an effort in the 1950s to revive the plan and build an 1100 m runway along with facilities for regional and air taxi operations as the Lausanne-Ecublens Regional Airport (French: Aéroport régional Lausanne-Ecublens). A two-stage proposal foresaw paving at least one of the smaller grass surface runways as well to support recreational and executive use, but ultimately this plan as well was shelved.

Strong growth in the agricultural industry in the 1960s fueled to a population explosion mostly through immigration. In addition, the municipality grew due to the influx of several large companies: in 1959, Socsil AG, in 1962, Socorex Isba AG, in 1964 Nokia-Maillefer Sapal AG, in 1970, ARL AG (Laboratory), in 1972, Leduc-Thévenaz Sirec AG and in 1979 the administration of Migros Vaud.

In the vicinity of the castle built by Etienne de Loys in 1770, the University of Lausanne built the Cantonal and University Library in 1970. In 1977, this was followed by the École Polytechnique Fédérale de Lausanne. Together they now occupy a fifth of the municipal area.

== Geography ==
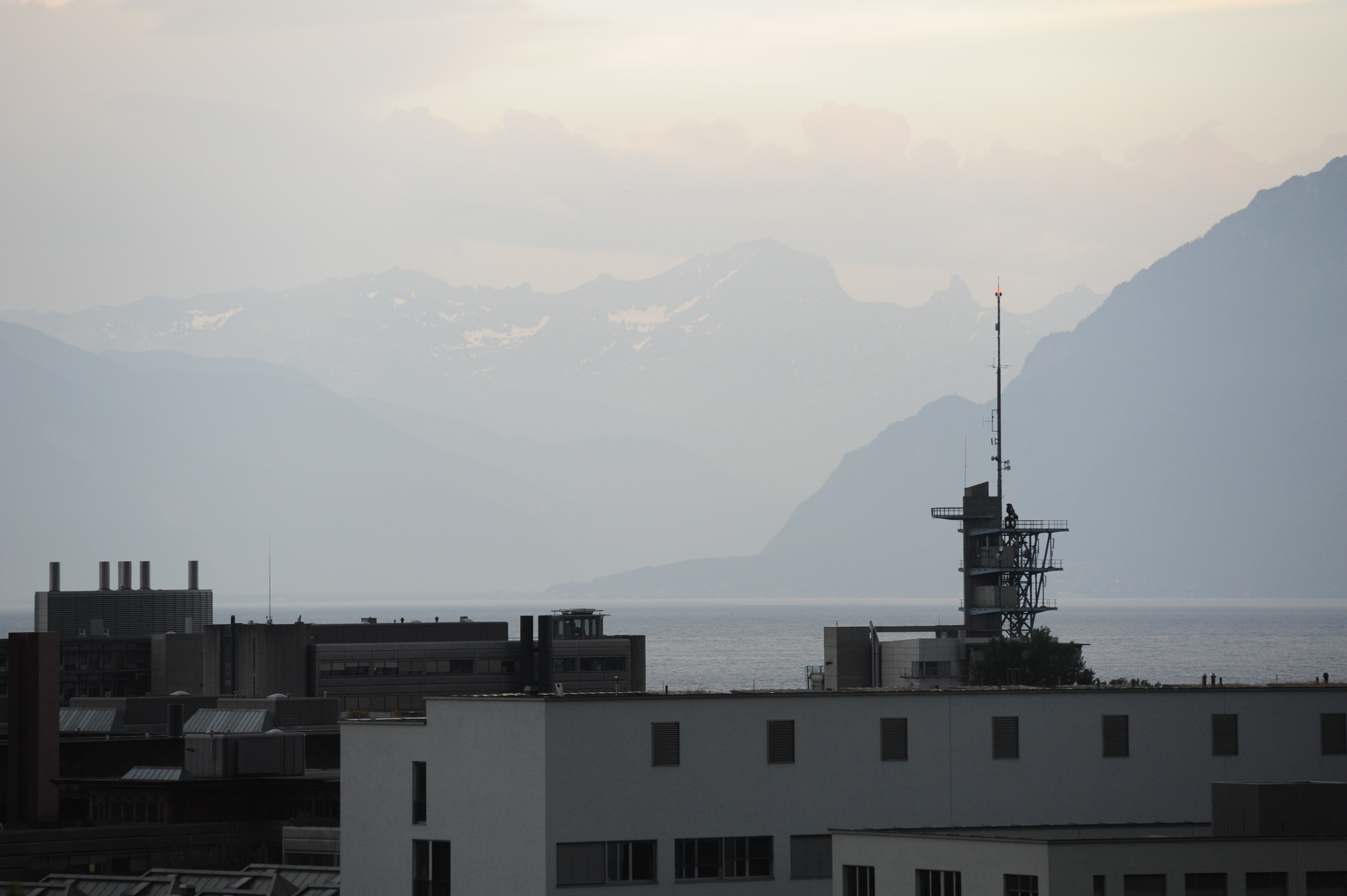
View from Écublens over the EPFL campus and Lake Léman.

Aerial view (1960)

Écublens has an area, as of 2009, of 5.7 square kilometers (2.2 mi^{2}). Of this area, 1.56 km^{2} (0.60 mi^{2}) or 27.3% is used for agricultural purposes, while 0.66 km^{2} (0.25 mi^{2}) or 11.6% is forested. Of the rest of the land, 3.4 km^{2} (1.3 mi^{2}) or 59.5% is settled (buildings or roads), 0.04 km^{2} (9.9 acres) or 0.7% is either rivers or lakes and 0.03 km^{2} (7.4 acres) or 0.5% is unproductive land.

Of the built up area, industrial buildings made up 9.5% of the total area while housing and buildings made up 27.8% and transportation infrastructure made up 16.6%. Power and water infrastructure as well as other special developed areas made up 1.2% of the area while parks, green belts and sports fields made up 4.4%. Out of the forested land, all of the forested land area is covered with heavy forests. Of the agricultural land, 22.8% is used for growing crops and 2.3% is pastures, while 2.3% is used for orchards or vine crops. All the water in the municipality is flowing water.

The municipality was part of the Morges District until it was dissolved on 31 August 2006, and Écublens became part of the new district of Ouest Lausannois.

The municipality includes the village of Le Motty, which is the administrative and religious center of the municipality, the rural village of Renges, and the hamlets of Bassenges, Villars, Epenex and Dorigny. Écublens is located on a moraine. Three rivers run through the municipality: the Venoge, Sorge and Chamberonne. Écublens contains the campuses of the University of Lausanne (since 1970) and the École Polytechnique Fédérale de Lausanne (since 1978).

== Coat of arms ==
The blazon of the municipal coat of arms is Per pale Azure and Gules, a bend Or overall.

== Demographics ==
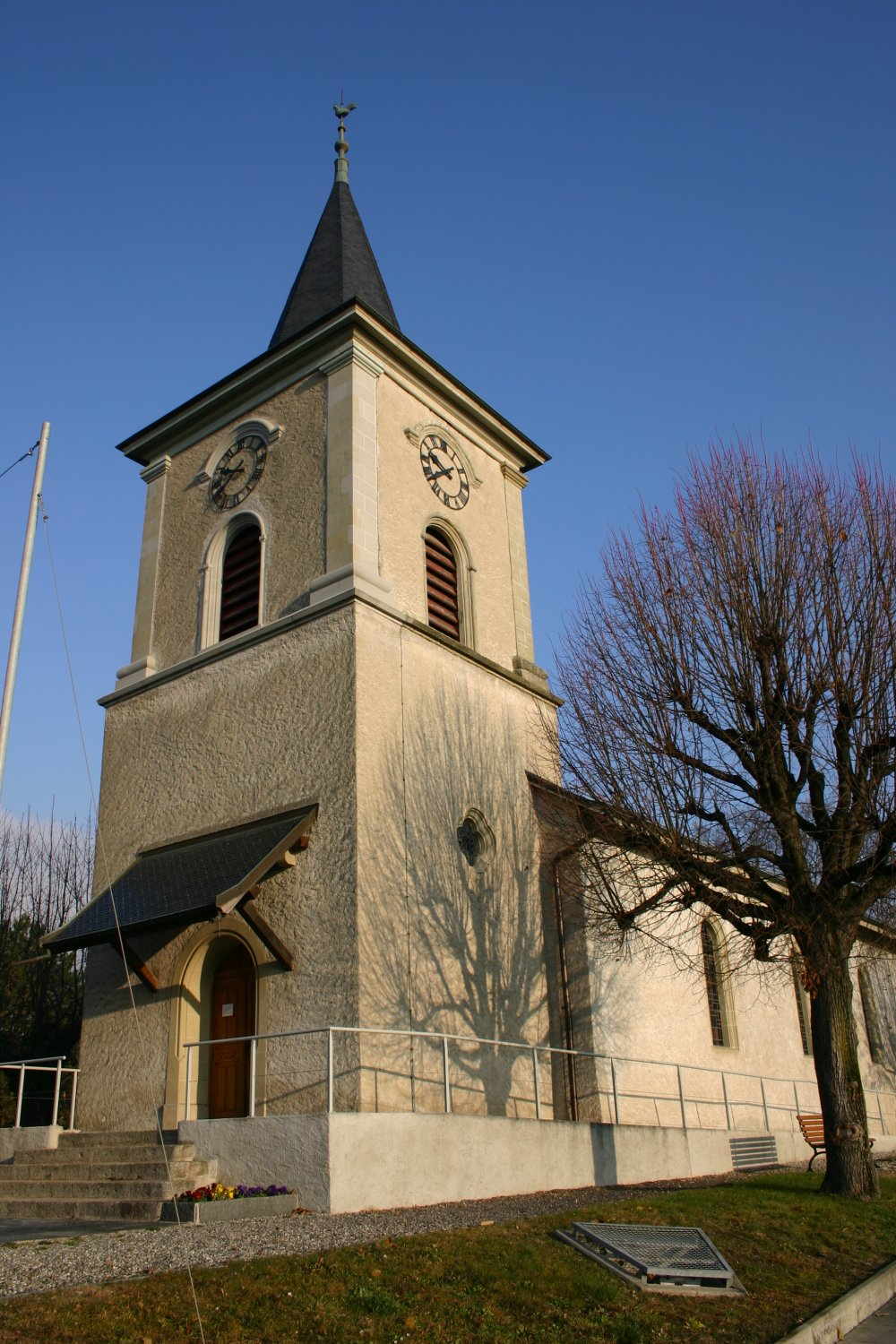
Church of Écublens

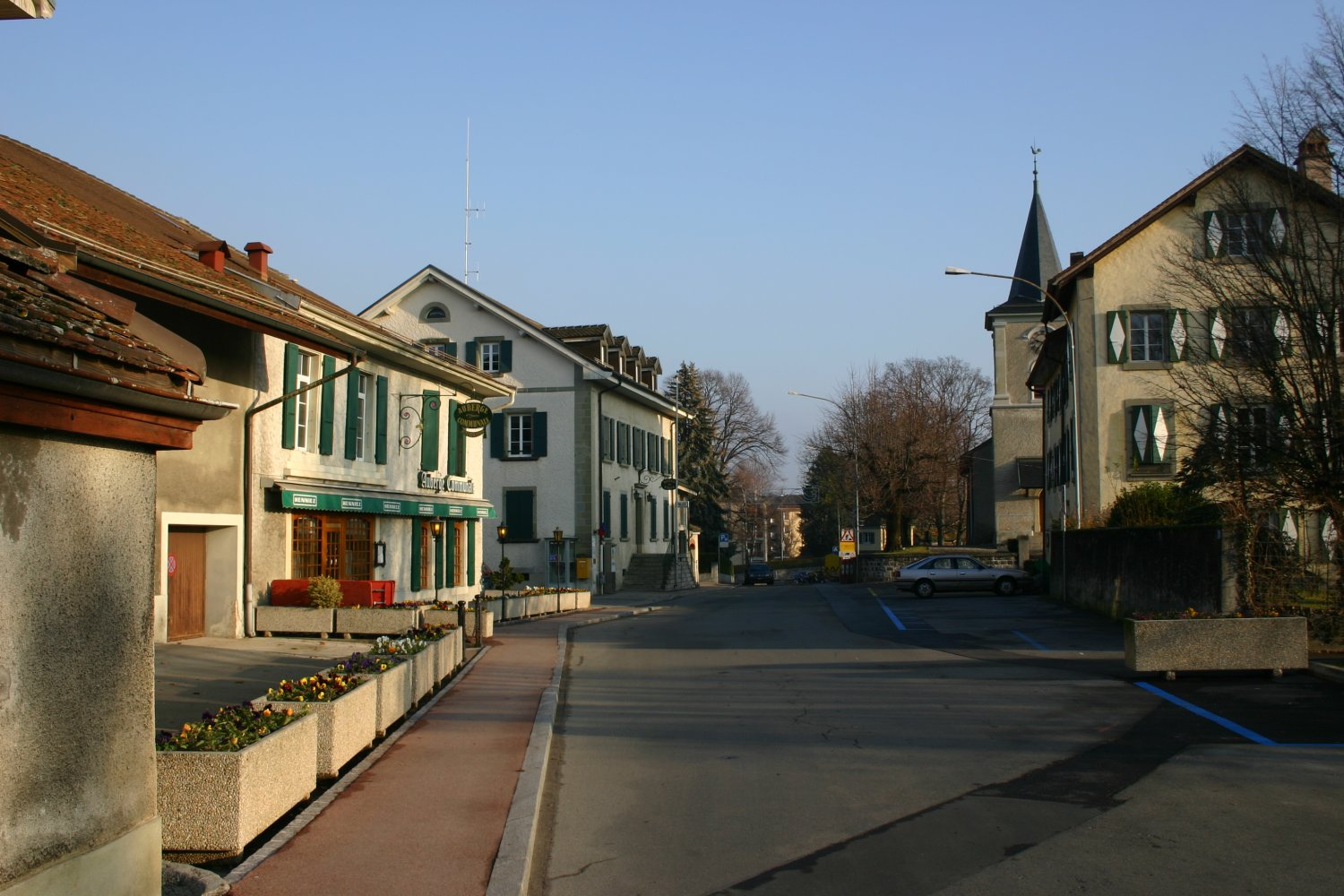
View of the village square also known as the Motty.

Écublens has a population (as of December 2020) of 13,157. As of 2008, 43.3% of the population are resident foreign nationals. Over the last 10 years (1999–2009) the population has changed at a rate of 13.1%. It has changed at a rate of 7.8% due to migration and at a rate of 6.1% due to births and deaths.

Most of the population (as of 2000) speaks French (7,825 or 76.5%), with Italian being second most common (667 or 6.5%) and German being third (467 or 4.6%). There are 4 people who speak Romansh.

Of the population in the municipality 1,718 or about 16.8% were born in Écublens and lived there in 2000. There were 2,916 or 28.5% who were born in the same canton, while 1,626 or 15.9% were born somewhere else in Switzerland, and 3,686 or 36.0% were born outside of Switzerland.

In 2008 there were 67 live births to Swiss citizens and 72 births to non-Swiss citizens, and in same time span there were 56 deaths of Swiss citizens and 8 non-Swiss citizen deaths. Ignoring immigration and emigration, the population of Swiss citizens increased by 11 while the foreign population increased by 64. There was 1 Swiss man who immigrated back to Switzerland and 4 Swiss women who emigrated from Switzerland. At the same time, there were 135 non-Swiss men and 110 non-Swiss women who immigrated from another country to Switzerland. The total Swiss population change in 2008 (from all sources, including moves across municipal borders) was an increase of 168 and the non-Swiss population increased by 81 people. This represents a population growth rate of 2.4%.

The age distribution, as of 2009, in Écublens is; 1,168 children or 10.7% of the population are between 0 and 9 years old and 1,235 teenagers or 11.3% are between 10 and 19. Of the adult population, 1,720 people or 15.8% of the population are between 20 and 29 years old. 1,700 people or 15.6% are between 30 and 39, 1,647 people or 15.1% are between 40 and 49, and 1,417 people or 13.0% are between 50 and 59. The senior population distribution is 1,073 people or 9.8% of the population are between 60 and 69 years old, 599 people or 5.5% are between 70 and 79, there are 281 people or 2.6% who are between 80 and 89, and there are 69 people or 0.6% who are 90 and older.

As of 2000, there were 4,387 people who were single and never married in the municipality. There were 4,740 married individuals, 463 widows or widowers and 637 individuals who are divorced.

As of 2000, there were 4,439 private households in the municipality, and an average of 2.2 persons per household. There were 1,676 households that consist of only one person and 191 households with five or more people. Out of a total of 4,527 households that answered this question, 37.0% were households made up of just one person and there were 18 adults who lived with their parents. Of the rest of the households, there are 1,066 married couples without children, 1,353 married couples with children There were 244 single parents with a child or children. There were 82 households that were made up of unrelated people and 88 households that were made up of some sort of institution or another collective housing.

In 2000 there were 363 single family homes (or 44.4% of the total) out of a total of 818 inhabited buildings. There were 298 multi-family buildings (36.4%), along with 104 multi-purpose buildings that were mostly used for housing (12.7%) and 53 other use buildings (commercial or industrial) that also had some housing (6.5%). Of the single family homes 44 were built before 1919, while 55 were built between 1990 and 2000. The greatest number of single family homes (74) were built between 1946 and 1960. The most multi-family homes (67) were built between 1961 and 1970 and the next most (62) were built between 1971 and 1980. There were 5 multi-family houses built between 1996 and 2000.

In 2000 there were 4,830 apartments in the municipality. The most common apartment size was 3 rooms of which there were 1,752. There were 524 single room apartments and 421 apartments with five or more rooms. Of these apartments, a total of 4,251 apartments (88.0% of the total) were permanently occupied, while 449 apartments (9.3%) were seasonally occupied and 130 apartments (2.7%) were empty. As of 2009, the construction rate of new housing units was 9.1 new units per 1000 residents. The vacancy rate for the municipality, in 2010, was 0.11%.

The historical population is given in the following chart:

== Heritage sites of national significance ==
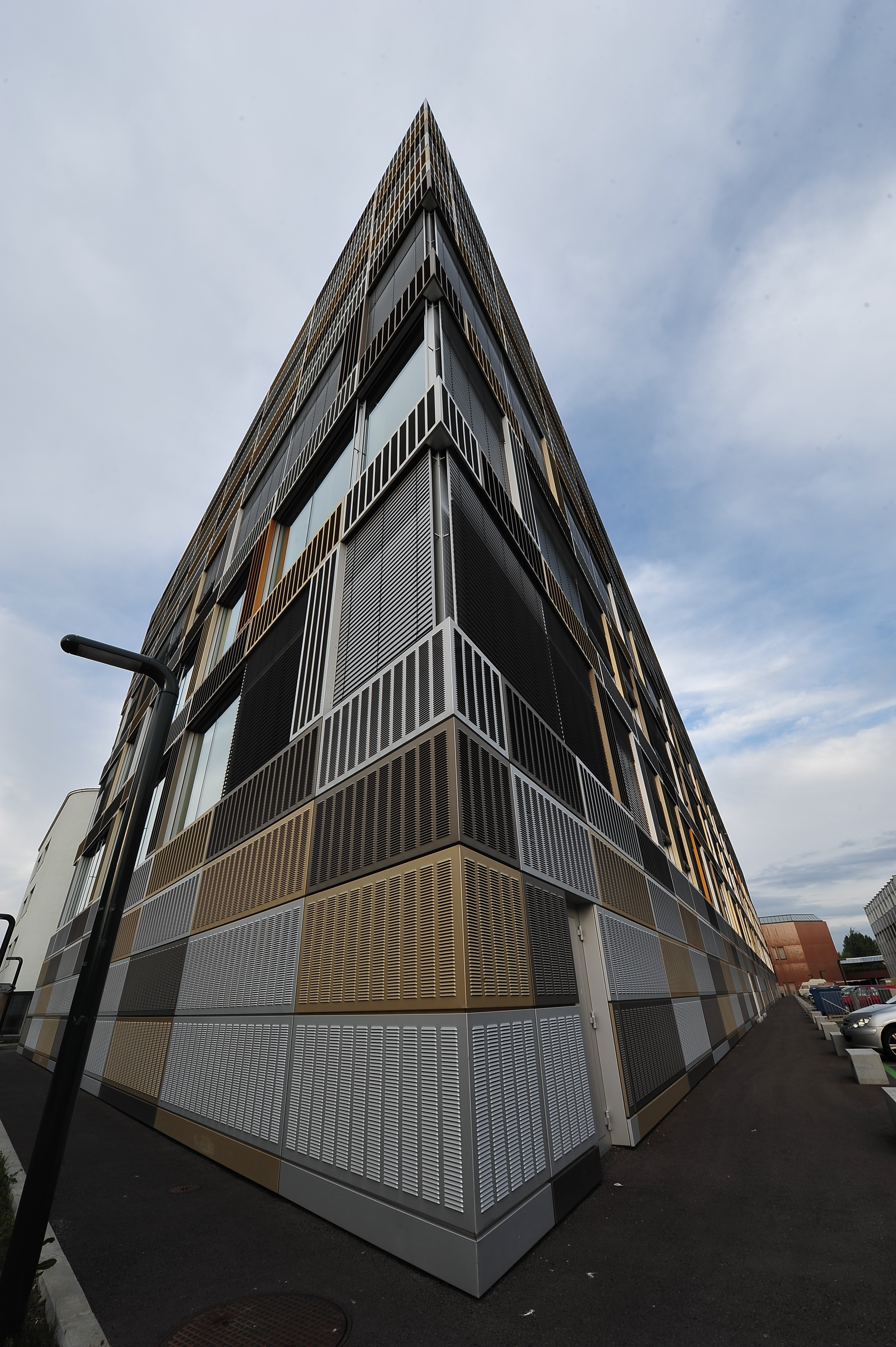
A building of the EPFL in Écublens

The Archives of Modern Construction at the École Polytechnique Fédérale de Lausanne (EPFL), the Cantonal and University Library of Lausanne and University of Lausanne manuscripts department and the Jean Monnet Foundation for Europe are listed as Swiss heritage site of national significance.

== Politics ==
In the 2007 federal election the most popular party was the SVP which received 24.95% of the vote. The next three most popular parties were the SP (24.61%), the Green Party (14.18%) and the FDP (11.25%). In the federal election, a total of 1,956 votes were cast, and the voter turnout was 40.4%.

== Economy ==
As of 2010, Écublens had an unemployment rate of 5%. As of 2008, there were 22 people employed in the primary economic sector and about 8 businesses involved in this sector. 2,734 people were employed in the secondary sector and there were 143 businesses in this sector. 9,226 people were employed in the tertiary sector, with 373 businesses in this sector. There were 5,381 residents of the municipality who were employed in some capacity, of which females made up 42.8% of the workforce.

In 2008 the total number of full-time equivalent jobs was 10,353. The number of jobs in the primary sector was 14, of which 13 were in agriculture and 1 was in forestry or lumber production. The number of jobs in the secondary sector was 2,617 of which 2,033 or (77.7%) were in manufacturing and 478 (18.3%) were in construction. The number of jobs in the tertiary sector was 7,722. In the tertiary sector; 984 or 12.7% were in wholesale or retail sales or the repair of motor vehicles, 173 or 2.2% were in the movement and storage of goods, 248 or 3.2% were in a hotel or restaurant, 180 or 2.3% were in the information industry, 226 or 2.9% were the insurance or financial industry, 944 or 12.2% were technical professionals or scientists, 4,100 or 53.1% were in education and 391 or 5.1% were in health care.

In 2000, there were 5,896 workers who commuted into the municipality and 4,007 workers who commuted away. The municipality is a net importer of workers, with about 1.5 workers entering the municipality for every one leaving. About 1.7% of the workforce coming into Écublens are coming from outside Switzerland, while 0.0% of the locals commute out of Switzerland for work. Of the working population, 23% used public transportation to get to work, and 57.9% used a private car.

The École Polytechnique Fédérale de Lausanne (EPFL) and its Swiss Tech Convention Center are located in Écublens.

== Religion ==
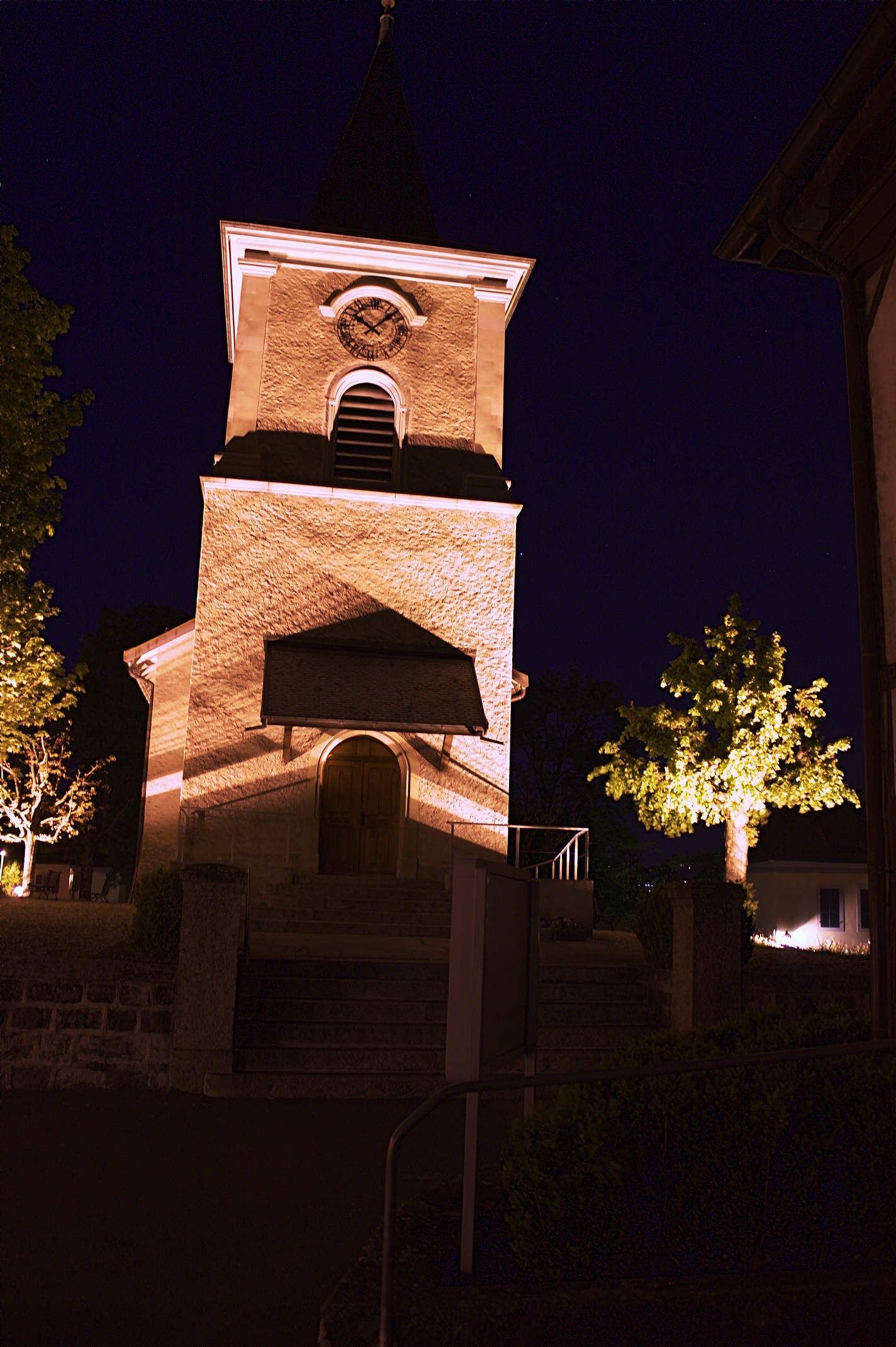
Church of Écublens by night

From the 2000 census, 4,308 or 42.1% were Roman Catholic, while 2,946 or 28.8% belonged to the Swiss Reformed Church. Of the rest of the population, there were 284 members of an Orthodox church (or about 2.78% of the population), there were 7 individuals (or about 0.07% of the population) who belonged to the Christian Catholic Church, and there were 429 individuals (or about 4.19% of the population) who belonged to another Christian church. There were 8 individuals (or about 0.08% of the population) who were Jewish, and 544 (or about 5.32% of the population) who were Islamic. There were 41 individuals who were Buddhist, 19 individuals who were Hindu and 20 individuals who belonged to another church. 1,323 (or about 12.94% of the population) belonged to no church, are agnostic or atheist, and 507 individuals (or about 4.96% of the population) did not answer the question.

== Education ==
In Écublens about 3,597 or (35.2%) of the population have completed non-mandatory upper secondary education, and 1,294 or (12.7%) have completed additional higher education (either university or a Fachhochschule). Of the 1,294 who completed tertiary schooling, 42.5% were Swiss men, 21.8% were Swiss women, 22.8% were non-Swiss men and 12.9% were non-Swiss women.

In the 2009/2010 school year there were a total of 1,204 students in the Écublens school district. In the Vaud cantonal school system, two years of non-obligatory pre-school are provided by the political districts. During the school year, the political district provided pre-school care for a total of 803 children of which 502 children (62.5%) received subsidized pre-school care. The canton's primary school program requires students to attend for four years. There were 625 students in the municipal primary school program. The obligatory lower secondary school program lasts for six years and there were 548 students in those schools. There were also 31 students who were home schooled or attended another non-traditional school.

As of 2000, there were 1,901 students in Écublens who came from another municipality, while 762 residents attended schools outside the municipality.

== Notable people ==
Well-known citizens of Écublens include Treytorrens de Loys, who commanded a division during the First World War, and François de Loys.

During his exile in Switzerland, Lenin stayed briefly in Écublens several times.

== See also ==
- Dorigny
