= R5 (RER Vaud) =

Railway service in Switzerland

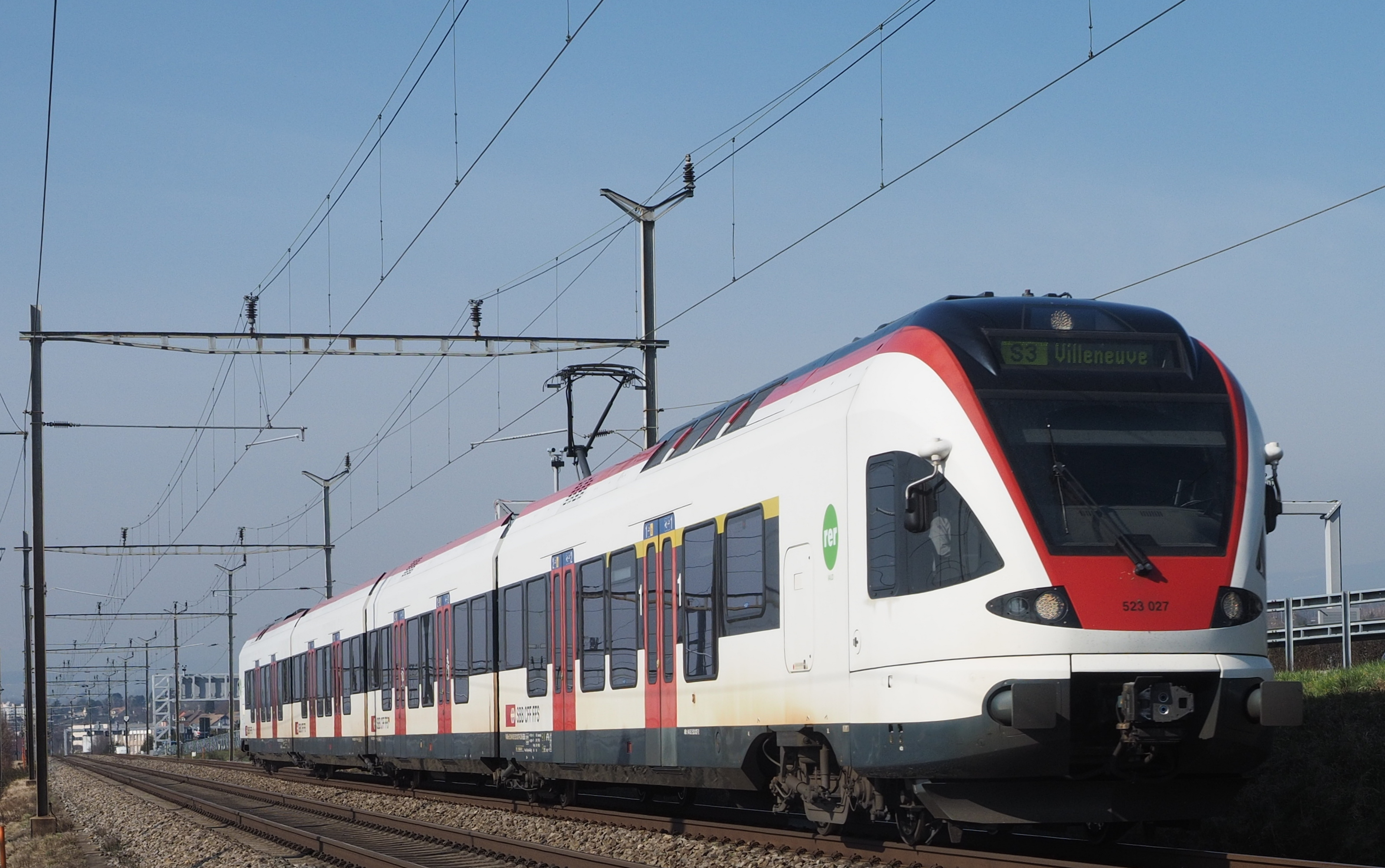
- A Villeneuve-bound S3 at Denges-Echandens in 2015; the S3 became the S5 in December 2022

Overview
- Predecessor: S3; S6
- First service: 11 December 2022
- Current operator(s): Swiss Federal Railways

Route
- Termini: Allaman; Palézieux
- Stops: 17
- Distance travelled: 42.1 kilometres (26.2 mi)
- Average journey time: 49 minutes
- Service frequency: Hourly
- Line(s) used: Lausanne–Bern; Lausanne–Geneva

The R5 is a railway service of RER Vaud that provides hourly service between Allaman and Palézieux in the Swiss canton of Vaud. Swiss Federal Railways, the national railway company of Switzerland, operates the service. The service was previously known as the S5.

== Operations ==
The R5 operates every hour between Allaman and Palézieux, using the Lausanne–Geneva and Lausanne–Bern lines. It makes all local stops. It is paired with the R6, providing half-hourly service between the two cities.

== History ==
RER Vaud introduced the S5 designation with the December 2015 timetable change, replacing the S11, which had operated between Lausanne and Yverdon-les-Bains, just south of Grandson. The new S5 operated from Grandson via Lausanne to Palézieux, on the Lausanne–Bern line. With the December 2020 timetable change the eastern terminus was changed from Palézieux to Aigle, replacing the S3, with limited service beyond to Bex and St-Maurice. In December 2021, SBB extended the S5 on weekdays from Aigle to Bex.

The RER Vaud lines were substantially reorganized for the December 2022 timetable change. The "new" S5 was a combination of the former S3 and S6, making local stops on the Simplon line between Allaman and Palézieux. On 10 December 2023, all RER Vaud lines were renamed as "R" and a number, instead of "S."
