= Creation of the World (Raphael) =

Mosaic by Raphael

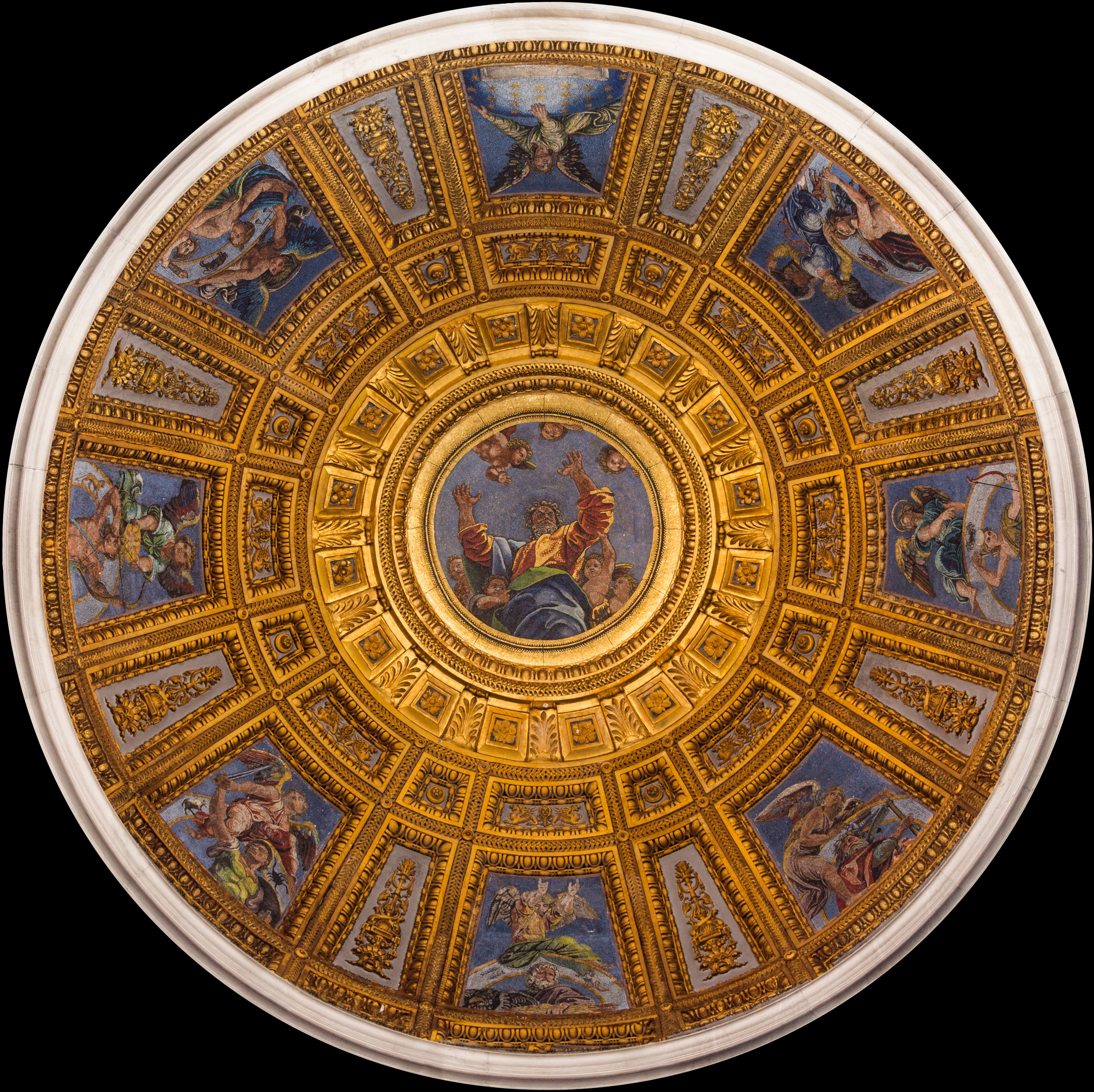
- Artist: Raphael
- Year: 1516
- Type: Mosaics
- Location: Chigi Chapel, Rome

Creation of the World is a mosaic composition in the dome of the Chigi Chapel in Santa Maria del Popolo, Rome, designed by Raphael. The chapel itself was designed by Raphael for his friend and patron, banker Agostino Chigi as a private chapel and family burial place. The dome was decorated with mosaics, a somewhat unusual and old-fashioned technique in the 16th century. Raphael's cartoons were executed by a Venetian craftsman, Luigi da Pace in 1516. The original cartoons were lost but some preparatory drawings, that confirm the originality of the work, survived in the Ashmolean Museum, Oxford. There are two studies for the figure of God and one for the angel above Jupiter. Another drawing in the Palais des Beaux-Arts in Lille shows the planet Mars with an angel. This is probably a creative drawing by a pupil suggested by its inferior quality. Luigi da Pace signed and dated the work at the corner of the panel of Venus:

"LV[dovicus] D[e] P[ace] V[enetus] F[ecit] 1516"

== Description ==
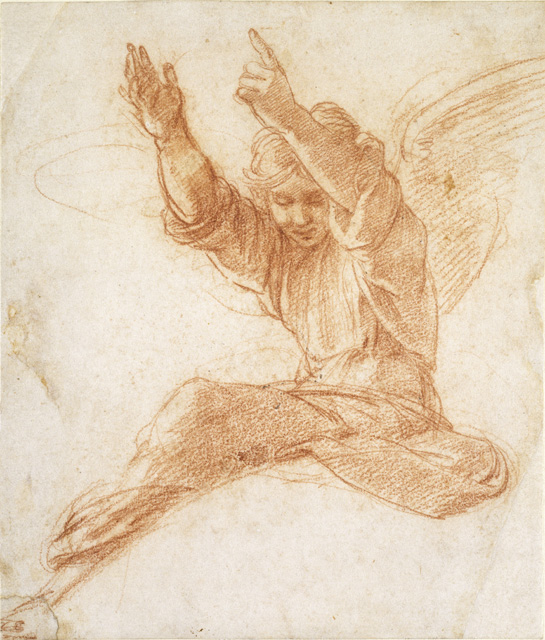
Preparatory drawing by Raphael

The central roundel represents God, the Father, surrounded by putti, effectively foreshortened in an impetuous gesture, harking back to Michelangelo, which seems to give rise to the entire motion of the universe below. Eight mosaic panels show the Sun, the Moon, the starry sky and the six known planets as pagan deities depicted in half-length, each accompanied by an angel with colourful feathered wings. The figures are accompanied by the signs of the zodiac.

The sequence of the panels is as follows: the sky; Mercury, the god holding the caduceus (with Virgo and Gemini); Luna, the crescent moon jewelled goddess holding a bow (with Cancer); Saturn, the bearded god holding the scythe (with Aquarius and Capricorn); Jupiter, the king of the gods with his eagle holding a thunderbolt (with Sagittarius and Pisces); Mars, the god of war holding a sword and a shield (with Scorpio and Aries); Sol, the sun-jewelled god holding a bow (with Leo); Venus, the goddess of love with Cupid holding a torch as the Evening Star (with Taurus and Libra). A French engraver, Nicolas Dorigny created a series of plates depicting the mosaics in 1695 for Louis, Duke of Burgundy.

The mosaic panels are surrounded by richly gilded stucco decoration. The blue background creates an optical illusion giving the impression of an architectural framework opening to the sky above the chapel. The panels look like illusionistic skylights between the gilt stucco ribs while God is standing on the edge of the central oculus.

The traditional interpretation of the dome is that the composition shows the Creation of the World. Another (disputed) interpretation claims that it represents the cosmos as described by Plato in a Christianized Neoplatonist form. This idea had a widespread popularity in the Renaissance. In this case the dome is a depiction of the Realm of the Soul after Death with God, the Father receiving the soul (of Agostino Chigi) in his new home. The presence of the signs of the zodiac corroborates this interpretation because the signs were symbols of the passage of time in eternity, and they appeared in antique funeral art around the image of the departed.

Nicole Riegel emphasized the role of the angels in the composition: "In view of the important, anything but accessory position of the angels in the panels, there is an unmistakable effort for a reconciliation or interfusion of the Pagan and Christian life view."

C. S. Lewis, in his book The Discarded Image, refers to the influence of On the Consolation of Philosophy by Boethius: "The noblest descendant of this passage, however, is not in words. At Florence in Santa Maria del Popolo the cupola above Chigi's tomb sets the whole Boethian image of the wheel and the hub, of Destiny and Providence, before our eyes. On the utmost circumference the planets, the dispensers of fate, are depicted. On a smaller circle, within and above them, are the Intelligences that move them. At the centre, with hands upraised in guidance, sits the Unmoved Mover."

== Gallery ==
Raphaelis Sanctii Urbinatis Planetarium (Nicolas Dorigny)

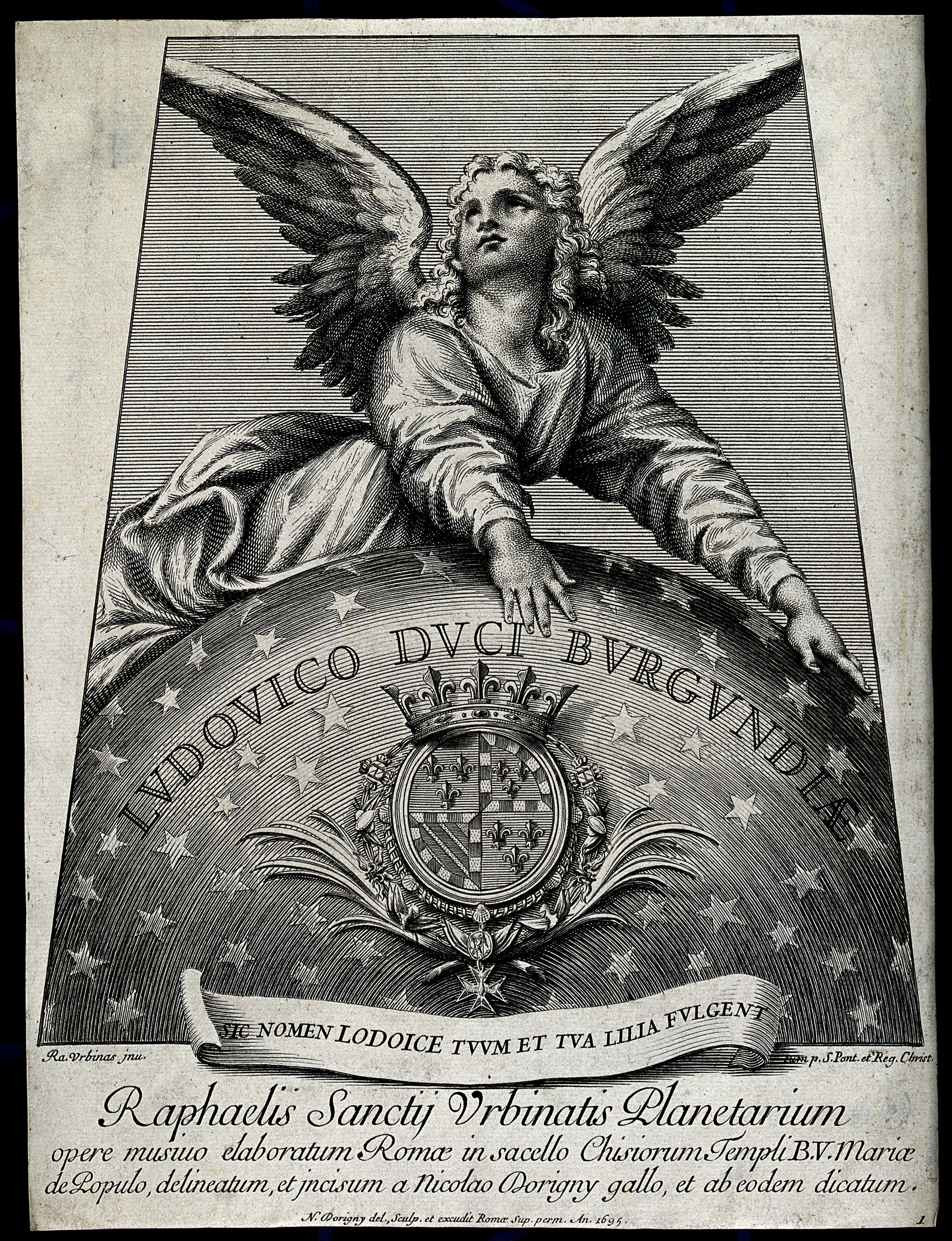

Title page

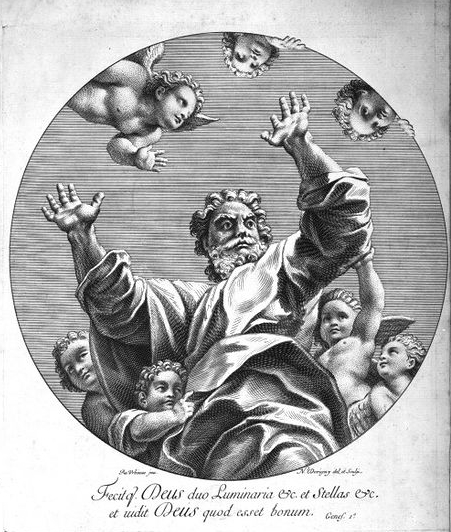

God, the Father

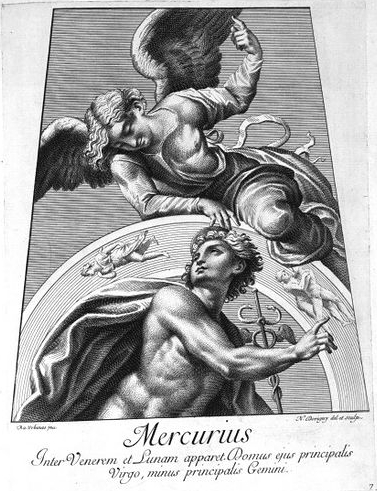

Mercury

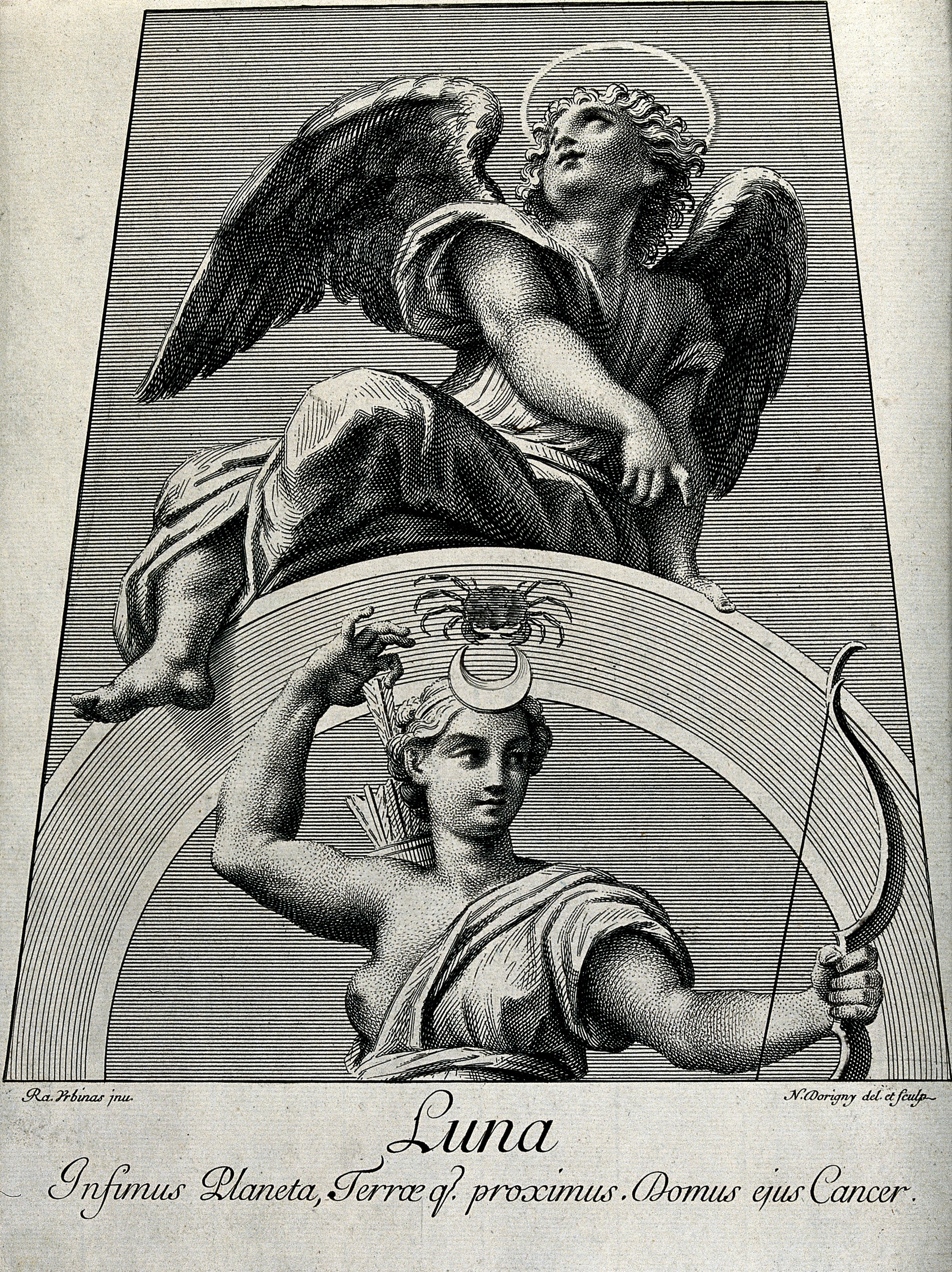

Luna

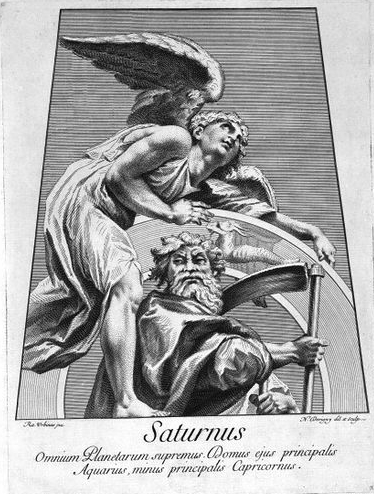

Saturn

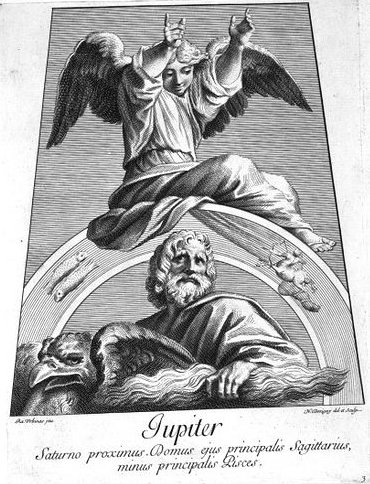

Jupiter

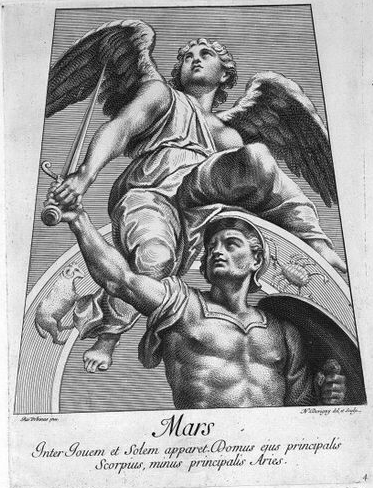

Mars

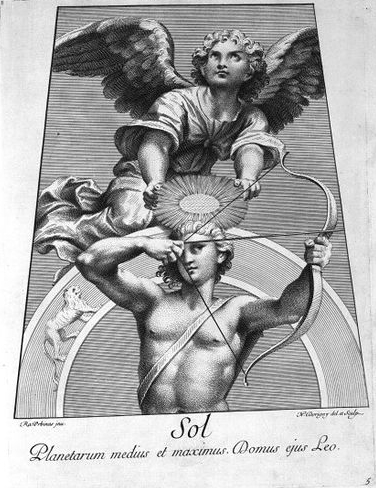

Sol

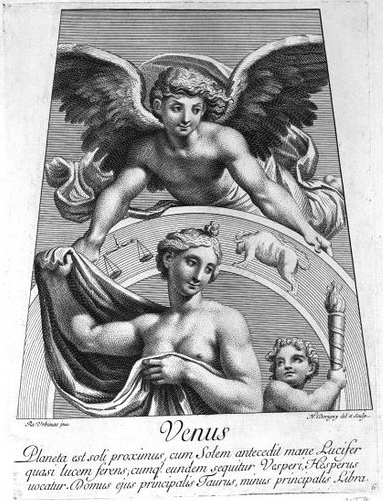

Venus
