= Morges-St-Jean railway station =

Railway station in Morges, Switzerland

Morges-St-Jean
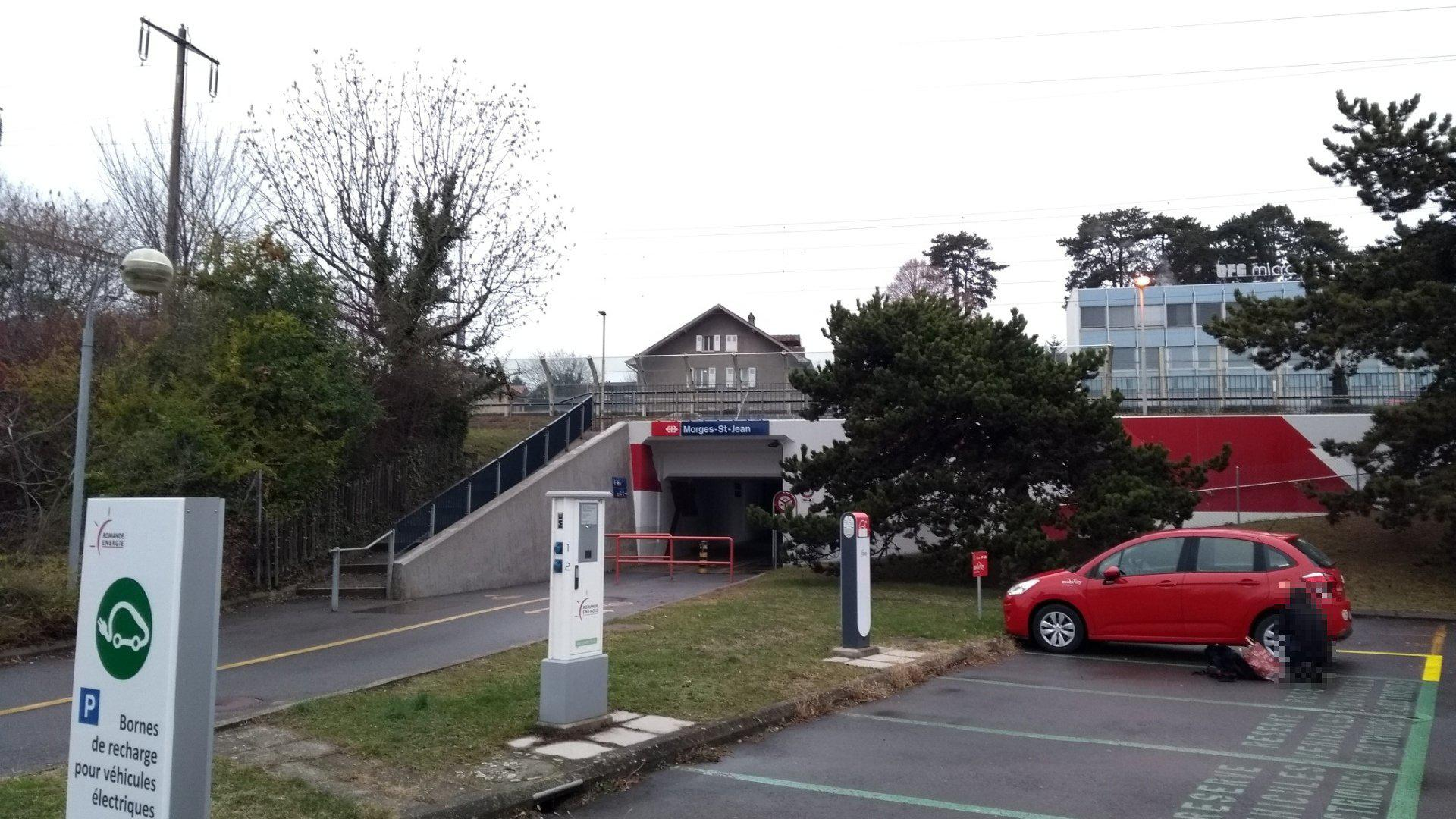
- The station platform in 2018

General information
- Location: Morges; Switzerland
- Coordinates: 46°31′06″N 6°30′29″E
- Elevation: 380 m (1,250 ft)
- Owner: Swiss Federal Railways
- Line: Lausanne–Geneva line
- Distance: 11.2 km (7.0 mi) from Lausanne
- Platforms: 2 side platforms
- Tracks: 2
- Train operators: Swiss Federal Railways
- Connections: MBC bus line

Construction
- Accessible: No

Other information
- Station code: 8501047 (STJ)
- Fare zone: 30 (mobilis)

Passengers
- 2023: 580 per weekday (SBB)

Services
Preceding station	RER Vaud	Following station
Morges towards Allaman	R9	Lonay-Préverenges towards Murten/Morat
Location

Morges-St-Jean railway station (French: Gare de Morges-St-Jean) is a railway station in the municipality of Morges, in the Swiss canton of Vaud. It is an intermediate stop on the standard gauge Lausanne–Geneva line of Swiss Federal Railways.

== Services ==
As of the December 2024 timetable change, the following services stop at Morges-St-Jean:

- RER Vaud R9: hourly service between Allaman and Murten/Morat.
