= Lausanne Airfield =

Lausanne Airfield Aérodrome de Lausanne-Blécherette
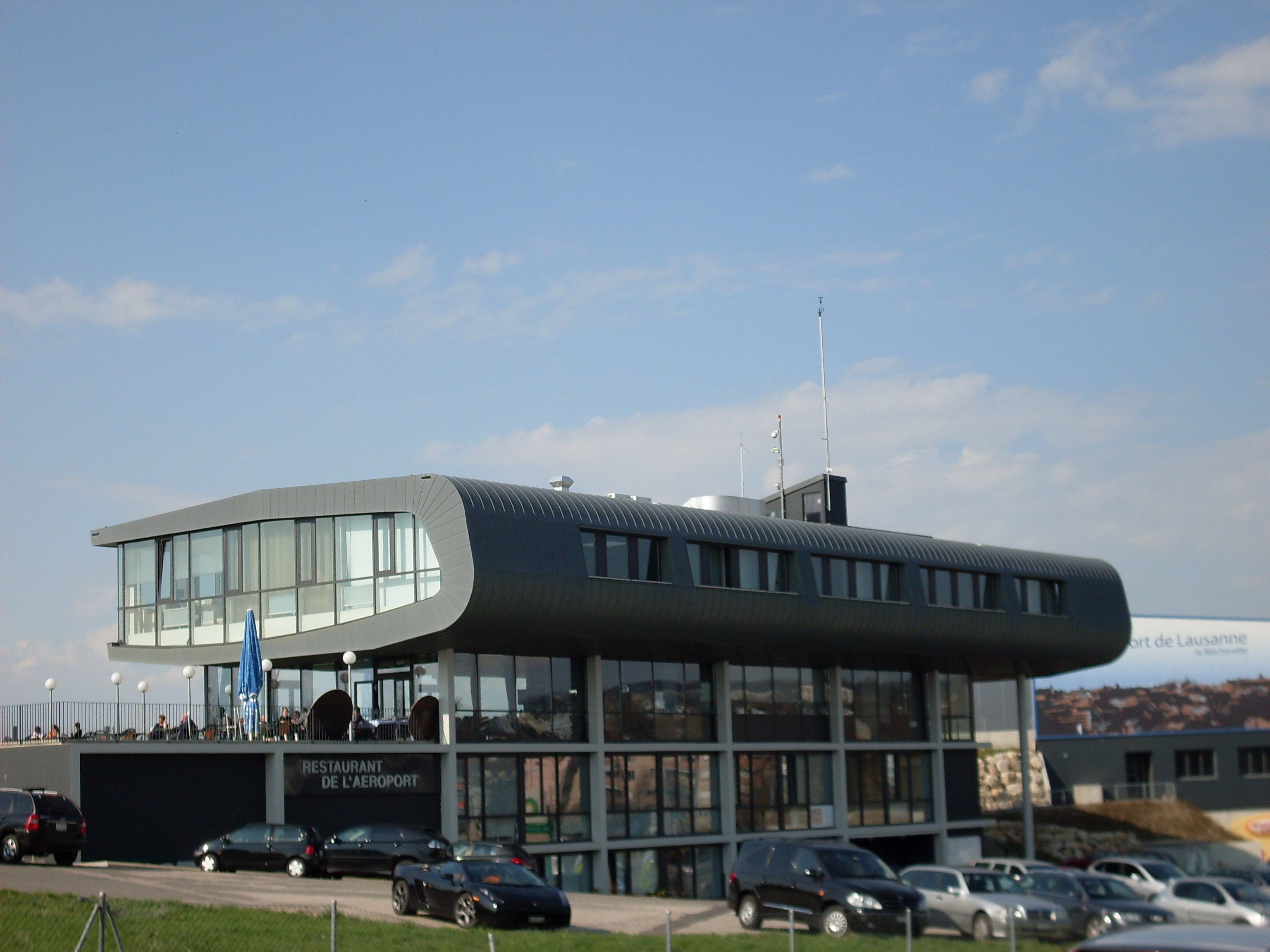
- IATA: none; ICAO: LSGL; WMO: 06710

Summary
- Serves: Lausanne, Switzerland
- Elevation AMSL: 622 m (2,041 ft)
- Coordinates: 46°32′43″N 6°37′00″E
- Website: lausanne-airport.ch
- Interactive map of Lausanne Airfield

Runways
Direction	Length		Surface
Direction	m	ft	Surface
18/36	775	2,542	Asphalt
- Source: Airport Website

Lausanne Airfield, (Note: French: Aéroport de Lausanne, German: Flughafen Lausanne, Italian: Aeroporto di Losanna) also known as Lausanne-Blécherette Airport, (Note: French: Aéroport de Lausanne-Blécherette, German: Flugplatz Lausanne-La Blécherette) is a small civil aerodrome located in the north of Lausanne, Switzerland. It has no scheduled commercial traffic and is used for general aviation. It also serves as a base for Swiss rescue services.

== History ==
The city established a runway in 1910. Henri Speckner was the first pilot to land here. A year later it created one of the first civil airfields in Switzerland around the runway. A hangar for maintenance of aircraft was built west of the runway in 1914, next to a farm. Due to increasing use of the airport another one was built in 1922. Since 1933 operations have been controlled by Aéroport de la région lausannoise "La Blécherette" S.A.

At the close of World War II, Lausanne's municipal government made plans to develop a proper regional airport for the city. Blécherette was deemed unfit for such development and thus provision was made to expand the nearby field in Écublens and dispose of Blécherette. However, efforts to begin such development ultimately failed to materialize and Ecublens fell out of use, leaving Lausanne-Blécherette as the only remaining operational aerodrome for the city. The nearest airport with scheduled service is Geneva Airport, which is connected to Lausanne via rail.

== Infrastructure ==
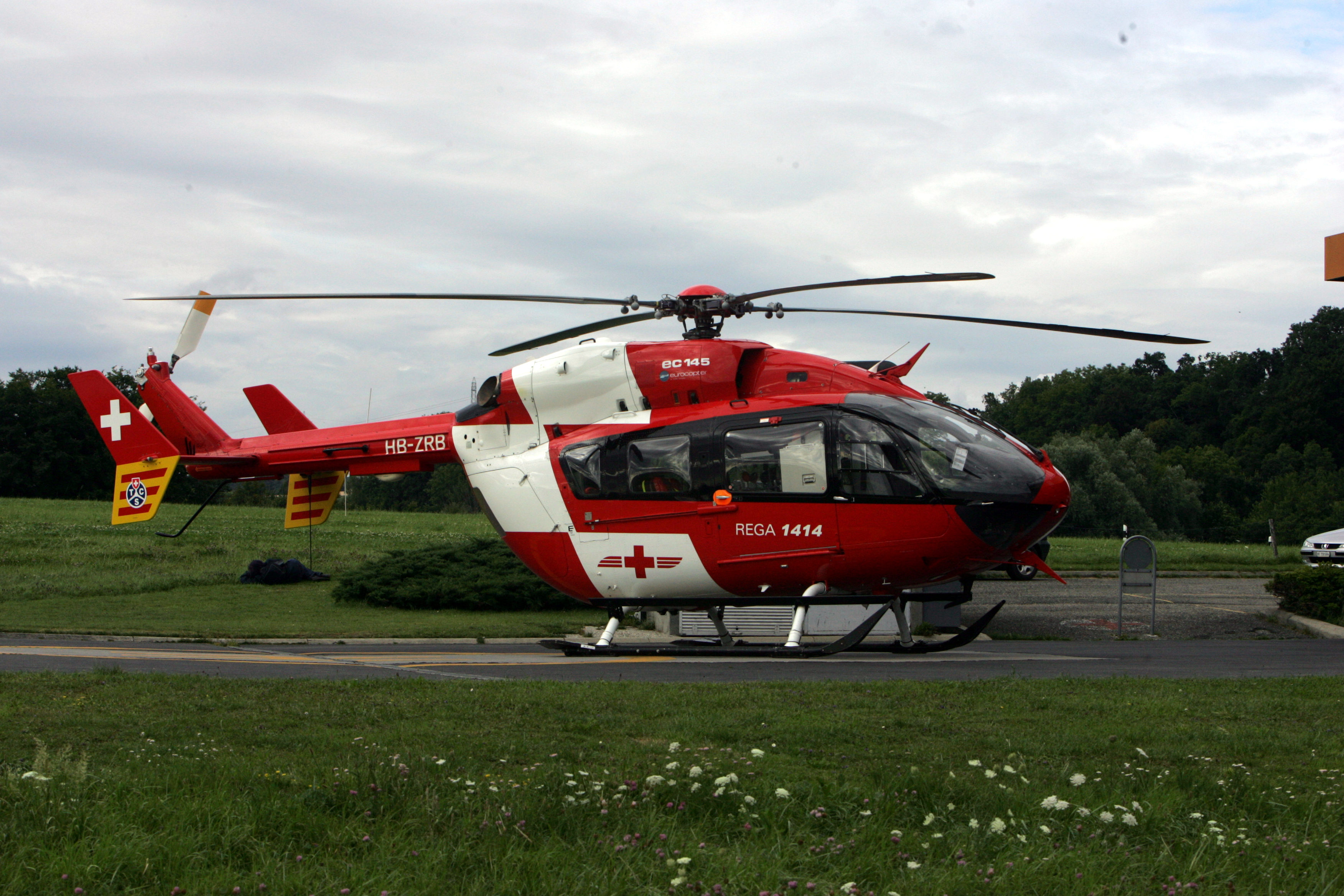
Eurocopter EC145 of Swiss rescue services based at Lausanne Airport

=== Facilities ===
The airfield features two maintenance hangars as well as a main building containing a restaurant. There is also a Boeing 737 simulator available.

=== Runway ===
In May 2000 the grass runway was replaced by a paved one (36/18). The runway has a slope, which means the maximum length for takeoff/landing varies depending on the direction between 775 and 805 m.

== Ground transport ==
Lausanne Airfield can be reached via the A9 motorway or public bus lines 1 and 21 of Transports publics de la région lausannoise. By car it's a ten-minute drive from the city centre.

== See also ==
- Transport in Switzerland
