= Denges =

- Municipality
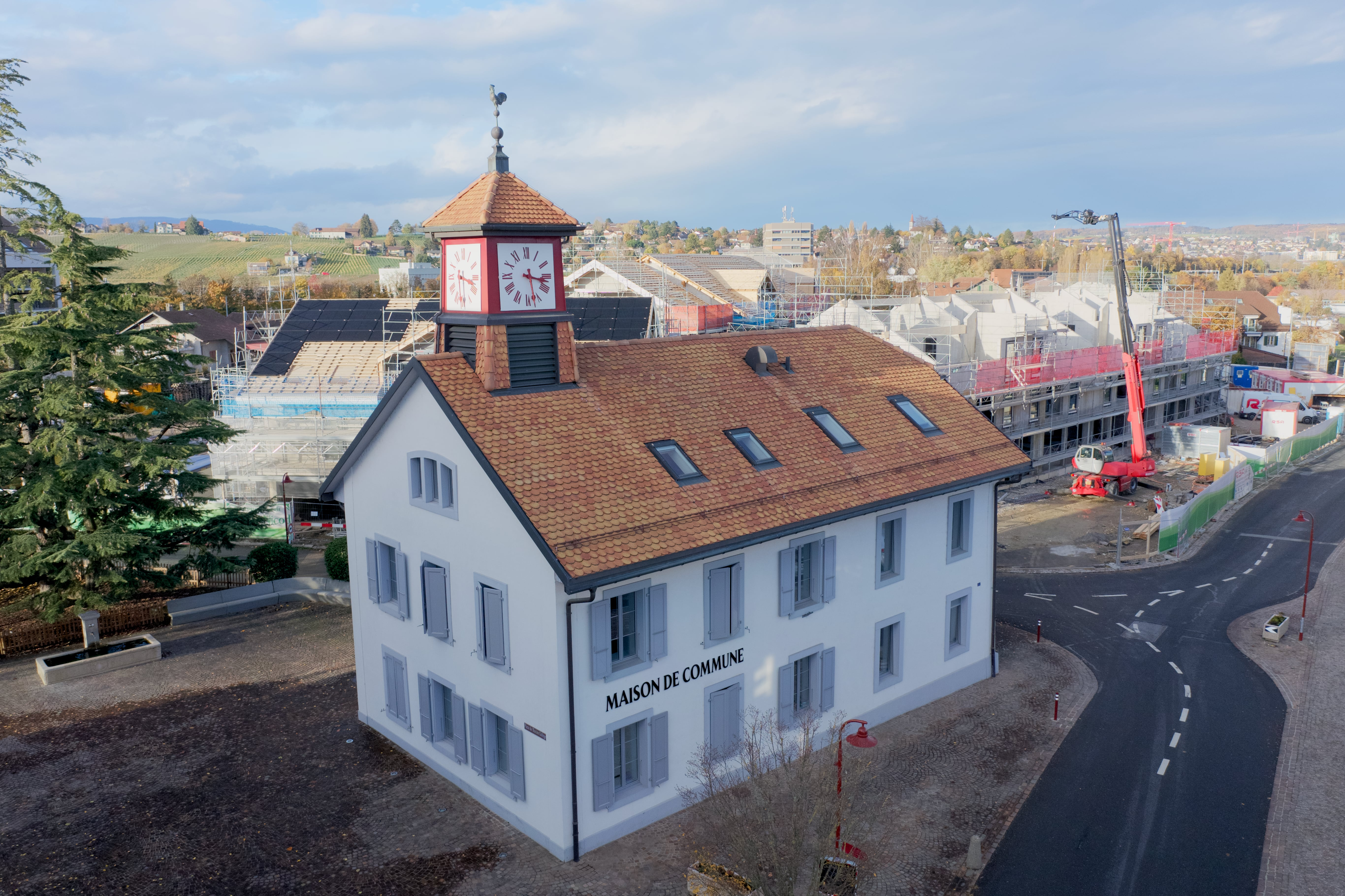
- Maison de commune

- Flag Coat of arms
- Location of Denges
- Location within Switzerland Location within Canton of Vaud
- Coordinates: 46°31′N 06°32′E
- Country: Switzerland
- Canton: Vaud
- District: Morges

Government
  - Mayor: Syndic; Francis Monnin

Area
  - Total: 1.67 km^{2} (0.64 sq mi)
- Elevation: 399 m (1,309 ft)

Population (2003)
  - Total: 1,205
  - Density: 722/km^{2} (1,870/sq mi)
- Time zone: UTC+01:00 (CET)
  - Summer (DST): UTC+02:00 (CEST)
- Postal code: 1026
- SFOS number: 5632
- ISO 3166 code: CH-VD
- Surrounded by: Échandens, Écublens, Lonay, Préverenges, Saint-Sulpice
- Website: www.denges.ch

Denges (French pronunciation: [dɑ̃ʒ]) is a municipality in the Swiss canton of Vaud, located in the district of Morges.

== History ==
Denges is first mentioned around 1107-11 as apud Dangias. In 1164 it was mentioned as Denges.

== Geography ==
Denges has an area, as of 2009, of 1.7 square kilometers (0.66 mi^{2}). Of this area, 0.82 km^{2} (0.32 mi^{2}) or 49.4% is used for agricultural purposes, while 0.09 km^{2} (0.035 mi^{2}) or 5.4% is forested. Of the rest of the land, 0.75 km^{2} (0.29 mi^{2}) or 45.2% is settled (buildings or roads), 0.02 km^{2} (4.9 acres) or 1.2% is either rivers or lakes.

Of the built up area, industrial buildings made up 6.0% of the total area while housing and buildings made up 13.9% and transportation infrastructure made up 22.9%. while parks, green belts and sports fields made up 1.8%. Out of the forested land, all of the forested land area is covered with heavy forests. Of the agricultural land, 30.7% is used for growing crops, while 18.1% is used for orchards or vine crops. All the water in the municipality is flowing water.

The municipality was part of the old Morges District until it was dissolved on 31 August 2006, and Denges became part of the new district of Morges.

The municipality is located on the right bank of the Venoge river.

== Coat of arms ==
The blazon of the municipal coat of arms is Per fess Argent and Gules, an arched Bridge Sable lined of the first overall.

== Demographics ==
Denges has a population (as of December 2020) of 1,725. As of 2008, 27.4% of the population are resident foreign nationals. Over the last 10 years (1999–2009 ) the population has changed at a rate of 44.8%. It has changed at a rate of 37.7% due to migration and at a rate of 8.2% due to births and deaths.

Most of the population (as of 2000) speaks French (936 or 84.4%), with Portuguese being second most common (59 or 5.3%) and German being third (31 or 2.8%). There are 30 people who speak Italian.

Of the population in the municipality 204 or about 18.4% were born in Denges and lived there in 2000. There were 402 or 36.2% who were born in the same canton, while 143 or 12.9% were born somewhere else in Switzerland, and 334 or 30.1% were born outside of Switzerland.

In 2008 there were 11 live births to Swiss citizens and 5 births to non-Swiss citizens, and in same time span there were 5 deaths of Swiss citizens and 1 non-Swiss citizen death. Ignoring immigration and emigration, the population of Swiss citizens increased by 6 while the foreign population increased by 4. There was 1 Swiss man and 1 Swiss woman who immigrated back to Switzerland. At the same time, there was 1 non-Swiss man who emigrated from Switzerland to another country and 13 non-Swiss women who immigrated from another country to Switzerland. The total Swiss population change in 2008 (from all sources, including moves across municipal borders) was a decrease of 15 and the non-Swiss population increased by 22 people. This represents a population growth rate of 0.5%.

The age distribution, as of 2009, in Denges is; 209 children or 13.5% of the population are between 0 and 9 years old and 200 teenagers or 12.9% are between 10 and 19. Of the adult population, 186 people or 12.0% of the population are between 20 and 29 years old. 245 people or 15.8% are between 30 and 39, 282 people or 18.2% are between 40 and 49, and 197 people or 12.7% are between 50 and 59. The senior population distribution is 130 people or 8.4% of the population are between 60 and 69 years old, 69 people or 4.5% are between 70 and 79, there are 29 people or 1.9% who are between 80 and 89.

As of 2000, there were 475 people who were single and never married in the municipality. There were 531 married individuals, 27 widows or widowers and 76 individuals who are divorced.

As of 2000, there were 456 private households in the municipality, and an average of 2.4 persons per household. There were 150 households that consist of only one person and 38 households with five or more people. Out of a total of 471 households that answered this question, 31.8% were households made up of just one person and there was 1 adult who lived with their parents. Of the rest of the households, there are 121 married couples without children, 155 married couples with children There were 23 single parents with a child or children. There were 6 households that were made up of unrelated people and 15 households that were made up of some sort of institution or another collective housing.

In 2000 there were 91 single family homes (or 53.2% of the total) out of a total of 171 inhabited buildings. There were 52 multi-family buildings (30.4%), along with 18 multi-purpose buildings that were mostly used for housing (10.5%) and 10 other use buildings (commercial or industrial) that also had some housing (5.8%). Of the single family homes 12 were built before 1919, while 5 were built between 1990 and 2000. The greatest number of single family homes (24) were built between 1971 and 1980. The most multi-family homes (15) were built before 1919 and the next most (11) were built between 1981 and 1990. There were 2 multi-family houses built between 1996 and 2000.

In 2000 there were 512 apartments in the municipality. The most common apartment size was 4 rooms of which there were 152. There were 30 single room apartments and 91 apartments with five or more rooms. Of these apartments, a total of 433 apartments (84.6% of the total) were permanently occupied, while 52 apartments (10.2%) were seasonally occupied and 27 apartments (5.3%) were empty. As of 2009, the construction rate of new housing units was 0.6 new units per 1000 residents. The vacancy rate for the municipality, in 2010, was 0%.

The historical population is given in the following chart:

== Politics ==
In the 2007 federal election the most popular party was the SP which received 26.99% of the vote. The next three most popular parties were the SVP (19.6%), the Green Party (15.79%) and the FDP (12.35%). In the federal election, a total of 395 votes were cast, and the voter turnout was 46.6%.

== Economy ==
As of 2010, Denges had an unemployment rate of 5.5%. As of 2008, there were 40 people employed in the primary economic sector and about 4 businesses involved in this sector. 241 people were employed in the secondary sector and there were 19 businesses in this sector. 339 people were employed in the tertiary sector, with 53 businesses in this sector. There were 611 residents of the municipality who were employed in some capacity, of which females made up 39.3% of the workforce.

In 2008 the total number of full-time equivalent jobs was 552. The number of jobs in the primary sector was 26, all of which were in agriculture. The number of jobs in the secondary sector was 230 of which 204 or (88.7%) were in manufacturing and 25 (10.9%) were in construction. The number of jobs in the tertiary sector was 296. In the tertiary sector; 83 or 28.0% were in wholesale or retail sales or the repair of motor vehicles, 101 or 34.1% were in the movement and storage of goods, 13 or 4.4% were in a hotel or restaurant, 32 or 10.8% were in the information industry, 13 or 4.4% were technical professionals or scientists, 7 or 2.4% were in education and 9 or 3.0% were in health care.

In 2000, there were 561 workers who commuted into the municipality and 486 workers who commuted away. The municipality is a net importer of workers, with about 1.2 workers entering the municipality for every one leaving. Of the working population, 12.4% used public transportation to get to work, and 66.3% used a private car.

== Religion ==
From the 2000 census, 380 or 34.3% were Roman Catholic, while 406 or 36.6% belonged to the Swiss Reformed Church. Of the rest of the population, there were 21 members of an Orthodox church (or about 1.89% of the population), there was 1 individual who belongs to the Christian Catholic Church, and there were 50 individuals (or about 4.51% of the population) who belonged to another Christian church. There were 2 individuals (or about 0.18% of the population) who were Jewish, and 39 (or about 3.52% of the population) who were Islamic. There were 3 individuals who belonged to another church. 179 (or about 16.14% of the population) belonged to no church, are agnostic or atheist, and 53 individuals (or about 4.78% of the population) did not answer the question.

== Education ==
In Denges about 402 or (36.2%) of the population have completed non-mandatory upper secondary education, and 131 or (11.8%) have completed additional higher education (either university or a Fachhochschule). Of the 131 who completed tertiary schooling, 58.0% were Swiss men, 24.4% were Swiss women, 11.5% were non-Swiss men and 6.1% were non-Swiss women.

In the 2009/2010 school year there were a total of 236 students in the Denges school district. In the Vaud cantonal school system, two years of non-obligatory pre-school are provided by the political districts. During the school year, the political district provided pre-school care for a total of 631 children of which 203 children (32.2%) received subsidized pre-school care. The canton's primary school program requires students to attend for four years. There were 139 students in the municipal primary school program. The obligatory lower secondary school program lasts for six years and there were 92 students in those schools. There were also 5 students who were home schooled or attended another non-traditional school.

As of 2000, there were 58 students in Denges who came from another municipality, while 107 residents attended schools outside the municipality.

== Transportation ==
The municipality has a railway station, Denges-Echandens, on the Lausanne–Geneva line. It has regular service to Allaman and Lausanne.
