= Lonay-Préverenges railway station =

Railway station in Lonay, Switzerland

Lonay-Préverenges
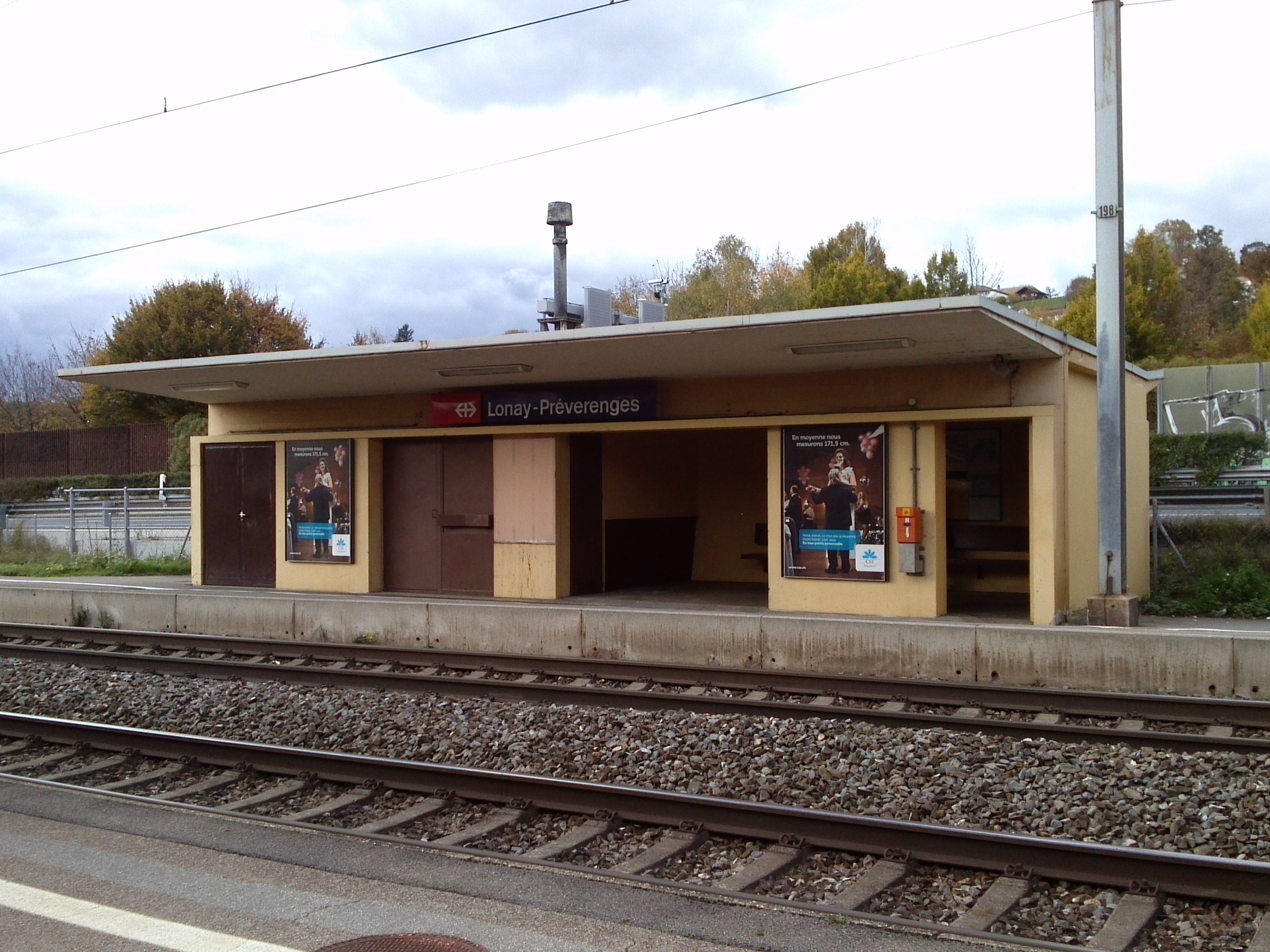
- The station platform in 2018

General information
- Location: Lonay; Switzerland
- Coordinates: 46°31′23″N 6°31′10″E
- Elevation: 386 m (1,266 ft)
- Owner: Swiss Federal Railways
- Line: Lausanne–Geneva line
- Distance: 10.1 km (6.3 mi) from Lausanne
- Platforms: 2 side platforms
- Tracks: 2
- Train operators: Swiss Federal Railways
- Connections: MBC buses

Construction
- Parking: Yes
- Accessible: No

Other information
- Station code: 8501048 (LON)
- Fare zone: 33 (mobilis)

Passengers
- 2023: 310 per weekday (SBB)

Services
Preceding station	RER Vaud	Following station
Morges towards Allaman	R8	Denges-Echandens towards Payerne
Morges-St-Jean towards Allaman	R9	Renens VD towards Murten/Morat
Location

Lonay-Préverenges railway station (French: Gare de Lonay-Préverenges) is a railway station in the municipality of Lonay, in the Swiss canton of Vaud. It is an intermediate stop on the standard gauge Lausanne–Geneva line of Swiss Federal Railways.

== Services ==
As of the December 2024 timetable change, the following services stop at Lonay-Préverenges:

- RER Vaud R8 / R9: half-hourly service between Allaman and Payerne, with every other train continuing from Payerne to Murten/Morat.
