= Bonaventura Lamberti =

Italian painter

Bonaventura Lamberti (c. 1653 – 19 September 1721) was an Italian painter of the Baroque period, active mainly in Rome. He was born at Carpi, and after some years working at Modena, he became a pupil of the painter Carlo Cignani in Rome. There, he became attached to the household of the Marchese Gabrieli. In Rome, he painted St. Francis of Paola resuscitating a dead Child for the church of the Santo Spirito dei Napoletani. He painted some cartoons used for mosaics for St. Peter's Basilica by Ottaviani. His Virgin showing the Infant Saviour to St. Jerome was engraved by Ludovico Dorigny. Among those who worked with him was Marco Benefial. He died in Rome.
