= Nicolas Dorigny =

French engraver

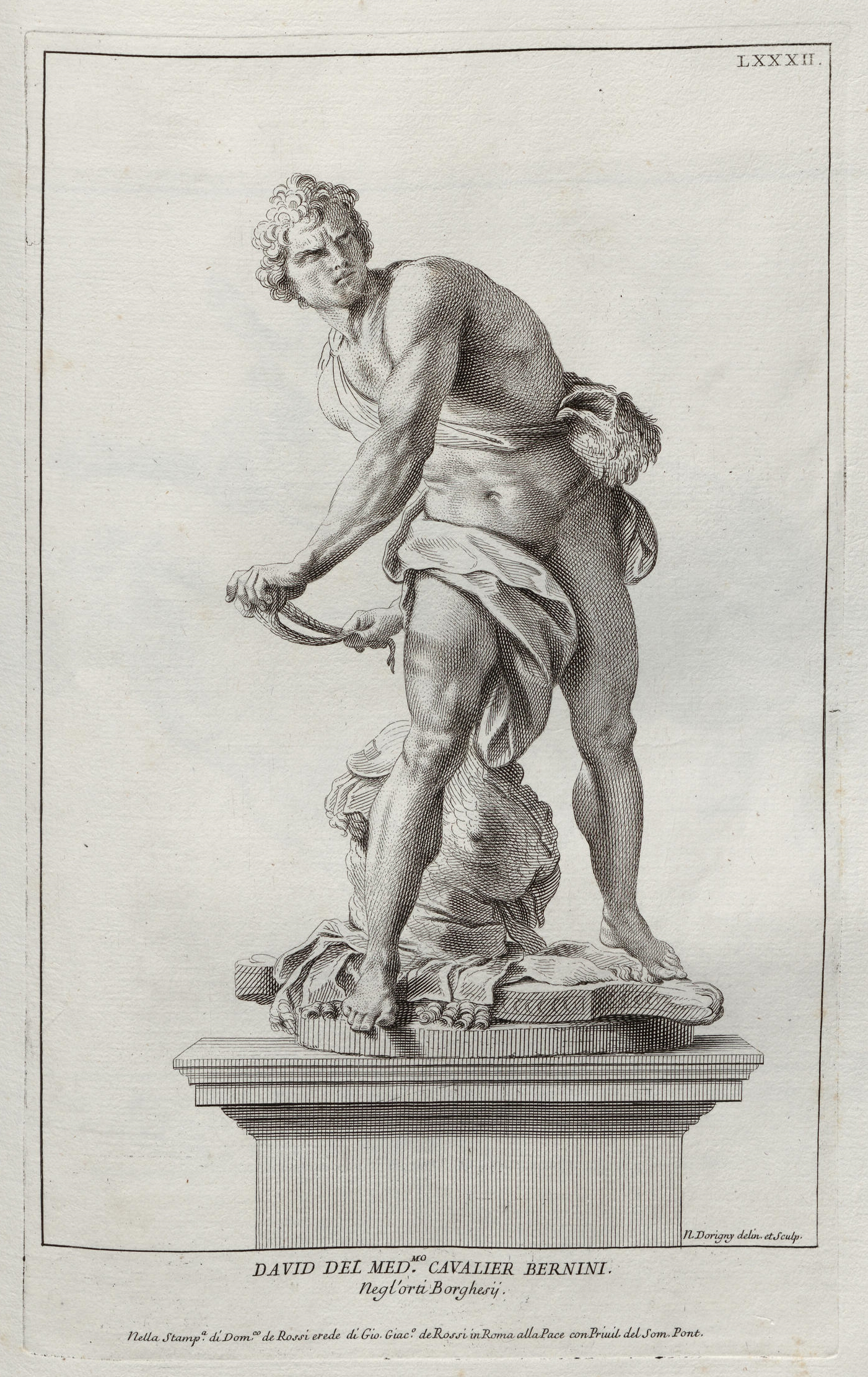
Bernini's David in an engraving by Nicolas Dorigny, 1704.

Sir Nicolas Dorigny was a French engraver, the youngest son of Michel Dorigny, and was born in Paris in 1652 or 1658. His education prepared him for the legal field, and he followed that profession until he was thirty years of age, when, as a result of deafness, he turned to the arts. He died in 1746.

== Career ==
Dorigny visited Italy, where he remained for twenty-eight years. His first plates were executed with the point. He is better known, however, for his technique unifying the point and the graver, characteristic of his later productions. He took for his model the admirable works of Gérard Audran.

Although he may not have equalled that celebrated artist, either in the style of his drawing, or in the picturesque effect of his light and shade, his prints will always be esteemed both for their merit as engravings and for the importance of the subjects which he chose.

In 1711, he was invited to England by Queen Anne to engrave the Cartoons of Raphael at Hampton Court, which he finished in 1719, and in the following year he was knighted by King George I. While he was in England he painted some portraits of the nobility, but with no great success. He returned to France in 1725, and was received into the Academy in the same year. He exhibited some pictures of sacred subjects at the Salon from 1739 to 1743, and died in Paris in 1746.

== Works ==
The following are his principal prints

- Nine plates of the six planets, the sky and the Sun and Moon; after the Creation of the World mosaic panels by Raphael in the Chigi Chapel in Santa Maria del Popolo.
- The Cartoons at Hampton Court; after the same; eight plates, including the title.
- The Transfiguration; after the same.
- The History of Cupid and Psyche, and the Triumph of Galatea, twelve plates, including the title; after the paintings from the designs of Raphael, in the Farnesina.
- The Descent from the Cross; after Danielle da Volterra.
- St Peter and St. John healing the Lame Man at the Gate of the Temple; after L. Cigoli.
- The Martyrdom of St. Sebastian; after Domenichino.
- The Martyrdom of St. Petronilla; after Guercino.
- St Francis kneeling before the Virgin and Child; after A. Carracci.
- St Catharine in Meditation; after Carlo Cignani.
- St Peter walking on the Sea; after Lanfranco.
- The Virgin and Child, with St. Charles Borromeo and St. Liborius; after B. Lamberti.
- The Trinity; after Guido Reni.
- The Birth of the Virgin; after Carlo Maratti.
- The Adoration of the Magi; after the same.
- The Virgin and Child, with St. Charles Borromeo and St. Ignatius; after the same.
- Eight plates of the paintings in the Cupola of St. Agnes; after Ciro Ferri.
