= Michel Dorigny =

French painter and engraver (1617–1663)

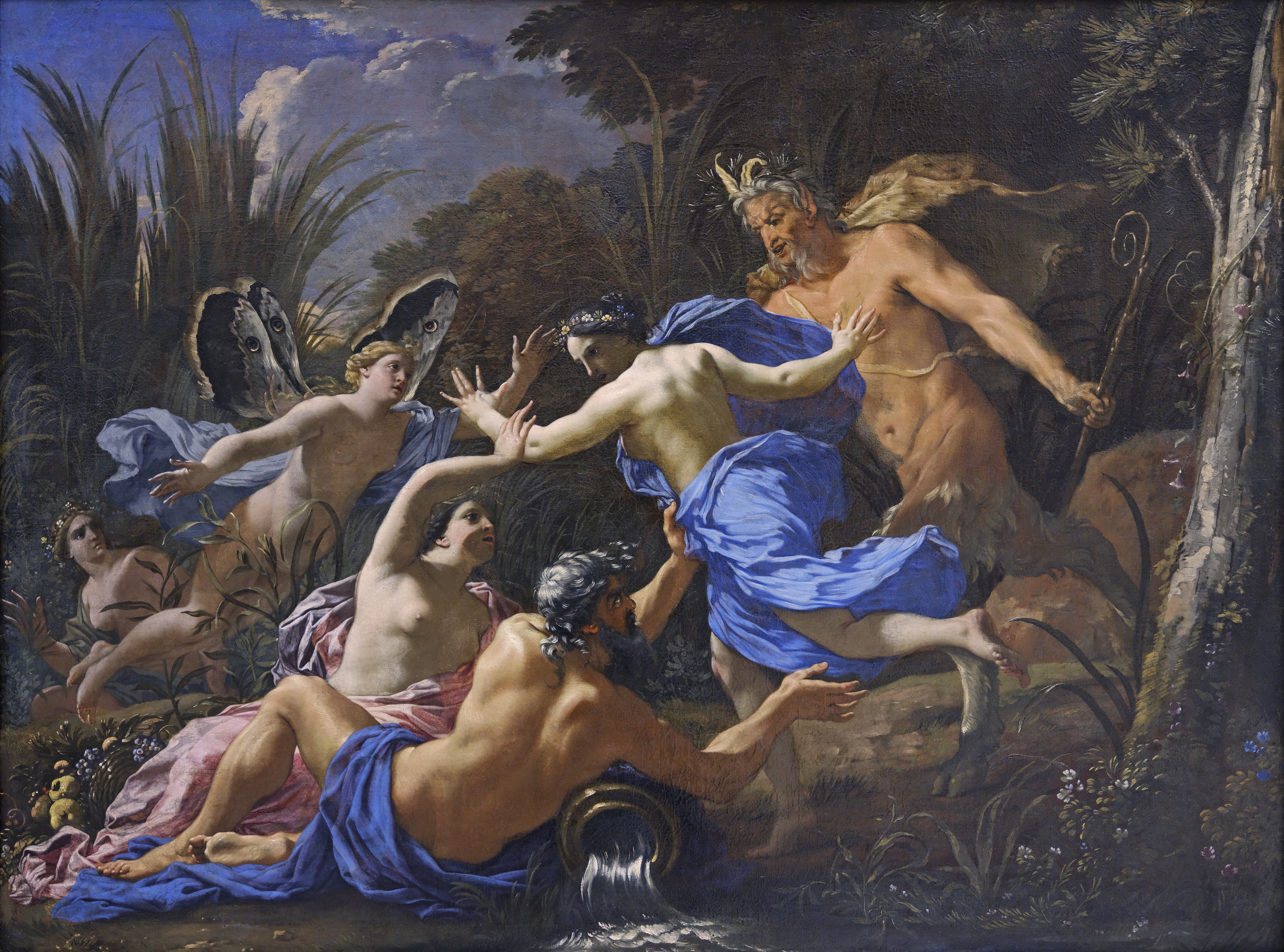
Pan and Syrinx

Michel Dorigny (1616 – 20 February 1665) was a French painter and engraver.

== Biography ==
Dorigny was born in Saint-Quentin. According to the Netherlands Institute for Art History, he was a pupil of Georges Lallemand and Simon Vouet. He trained at the Académie de peinture et de sculpture and became the teacher and father to the painters Nicolas and Louis Dorigny. According to Roger de Piles, he married Vouet's daughter and was himself professor of the Academy when he died in Paris.
