= Denges-Echandens railway station =

Railway station in Denges, Switzerland

Denges-Echandens
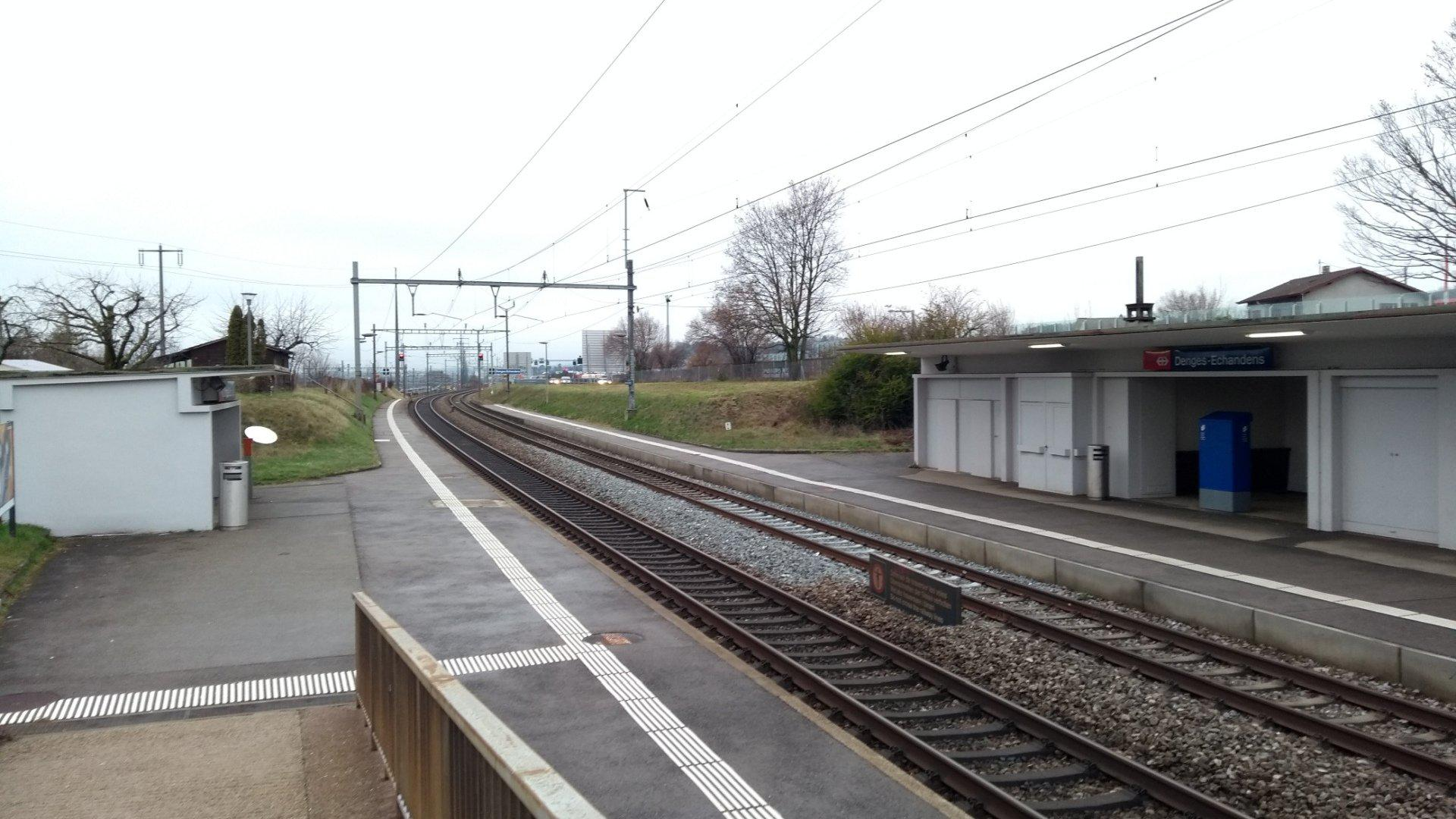
- The station in 2018

General information
- Location: Denges; Switzerland
- Coordinates: 46°31′45″N 6°32′26″E
- Elevation: 398 m (1,306 ft)
- Owner: Swiss Federal Railways
- Lines: Jura Foot line; Lausanne–Geneva line
- Distance: 8.4 km (5.2 mi) from Lausanne
- Platforms: 2 side platforms
- Tracks: 2
- Train operators: Swiss Federal Railways
- Connections: MBC bus line

Construction
- Parking: Yes (13 spaces)
- Accessible: No

Other information
- Station code: 8501045 (DEN)
- Fare zone: 33 (mobilis)

Passengers
- 2023: 380 per weekday (SBB)

Services
Preceding station	RER Vaud	Following station
Lonay-Préverenges towards Allaman	R8	Renens VD towards Payerne
Location

Denges-Echandens railway station (French: Gare de Denges-Echandens) is a railway station in the municipality of Denges, in the Swiss canton of Vaud. It is located at the junction of the standard gauge Jura Foot and Lausanne–Geneva lines of Swiss Federal Railways.

== Services ==
As of the December 2024 timetable change, the following services stop at Denges-Echandens:

- RER Vaud R8: hourly service between Allaman and Payerne.
