= Ludovico Dorigny =

French painter

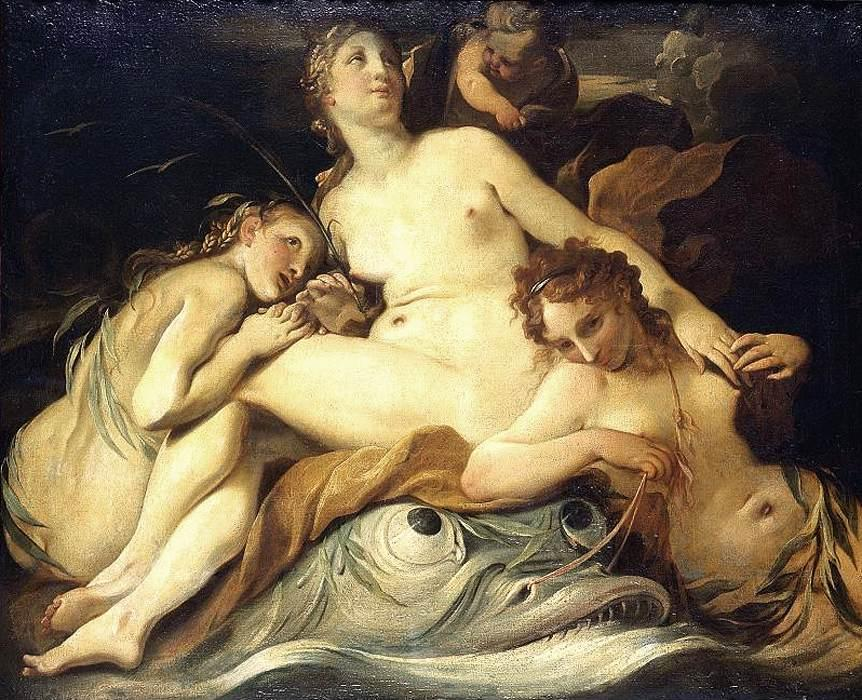
- Louis Dorigny, Galatea, late-17th century, priv. col.
- Born: 1654; Paris, France
- Died: 17 October 1742 (aged 87–88); Venice, Republic of Venice
- Education: Charles Le Brun
- Known for: Painting, Drawing
- Movement: Baroque

Ludovico Dorigny (1654 – 17 October 1742) was a French painter and engraver. Trained in his native country, he spent most of his life and career in Verona, Italy.

== Life and career ==
Born Louis Dorigny into a family of Parisian artists, Dorigny was the grandson of painter Simon Vouet and the son of engraver Michel Dorigny. As a boy he apprenticed with the painter Charles Le Brun and in his teens was commissioned to create works for Cardinal Richelieu and Louis XIV of France. He adopted the italianized version of his name, Ludovico, during his early years in Italy and it is by that name that he is chiefly known.

In 1671, at the age of 17, Dorigny came to Italy to study the Italian masters. He traveled back and forth between France and Italy over the next seven years, ultimately settling in Venice in 1678. He spent the next decade in that city where his works were in high demand by the nobility. In that city he also contributed works to the Chiesa degli Scalzi, painted the ceiling of the San Silvestro, and contributed decorations to the Palazzo Museli.

In 1688 Dorigny moved to Verona, where he remained until his death 54 years later. He visited his family in Paris in 1704 and in 1711 traveled to Vienna, where he decorated the Winter Palace of Prince Eugene of Savoy. He also contributed works to the Udine Cathedral and the Trento Cathedral.

Dorigny died at Venice on 17 October 1742.

== Gallery ==
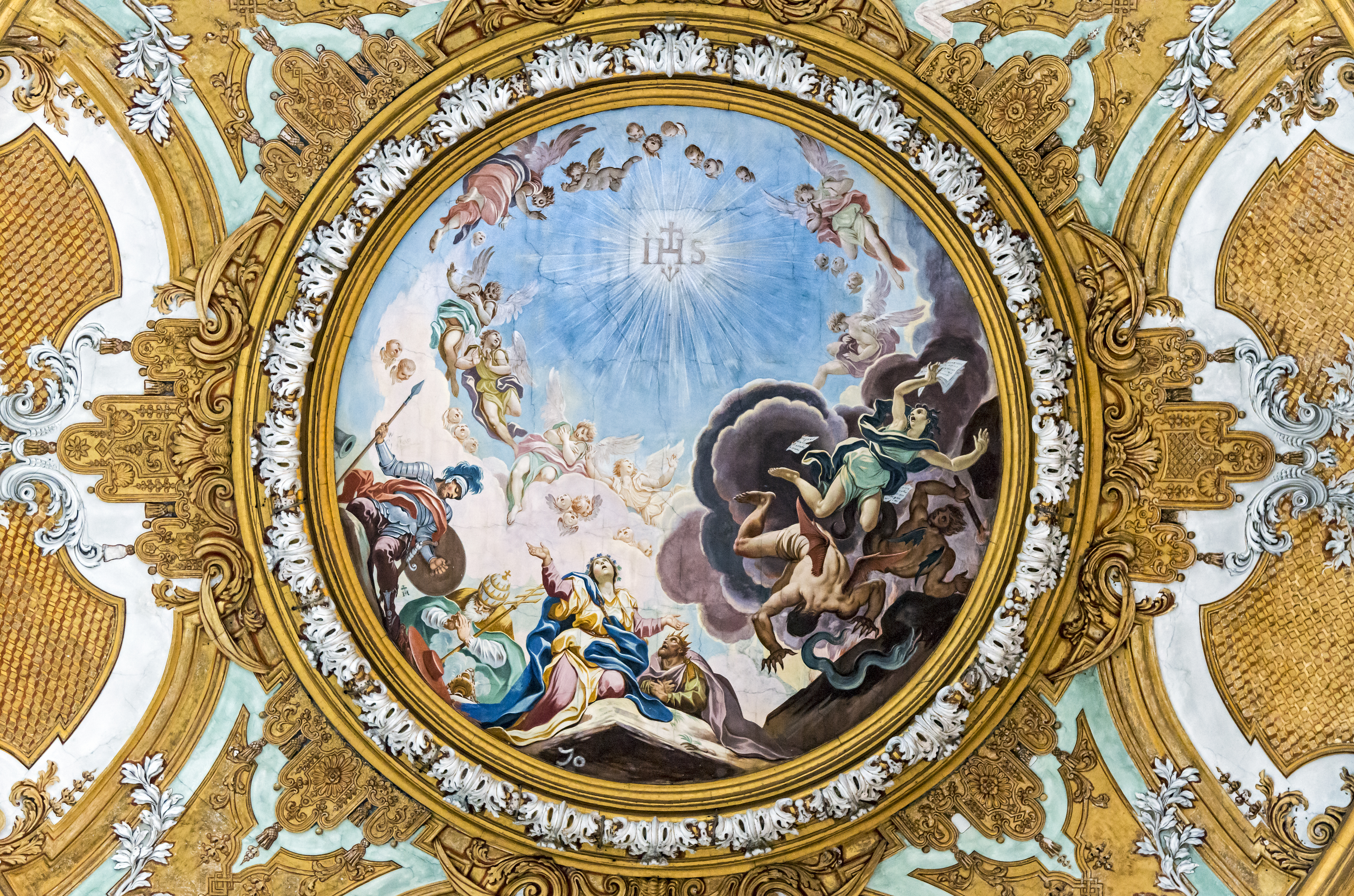
Ceiling of I Gesuiti, Venice

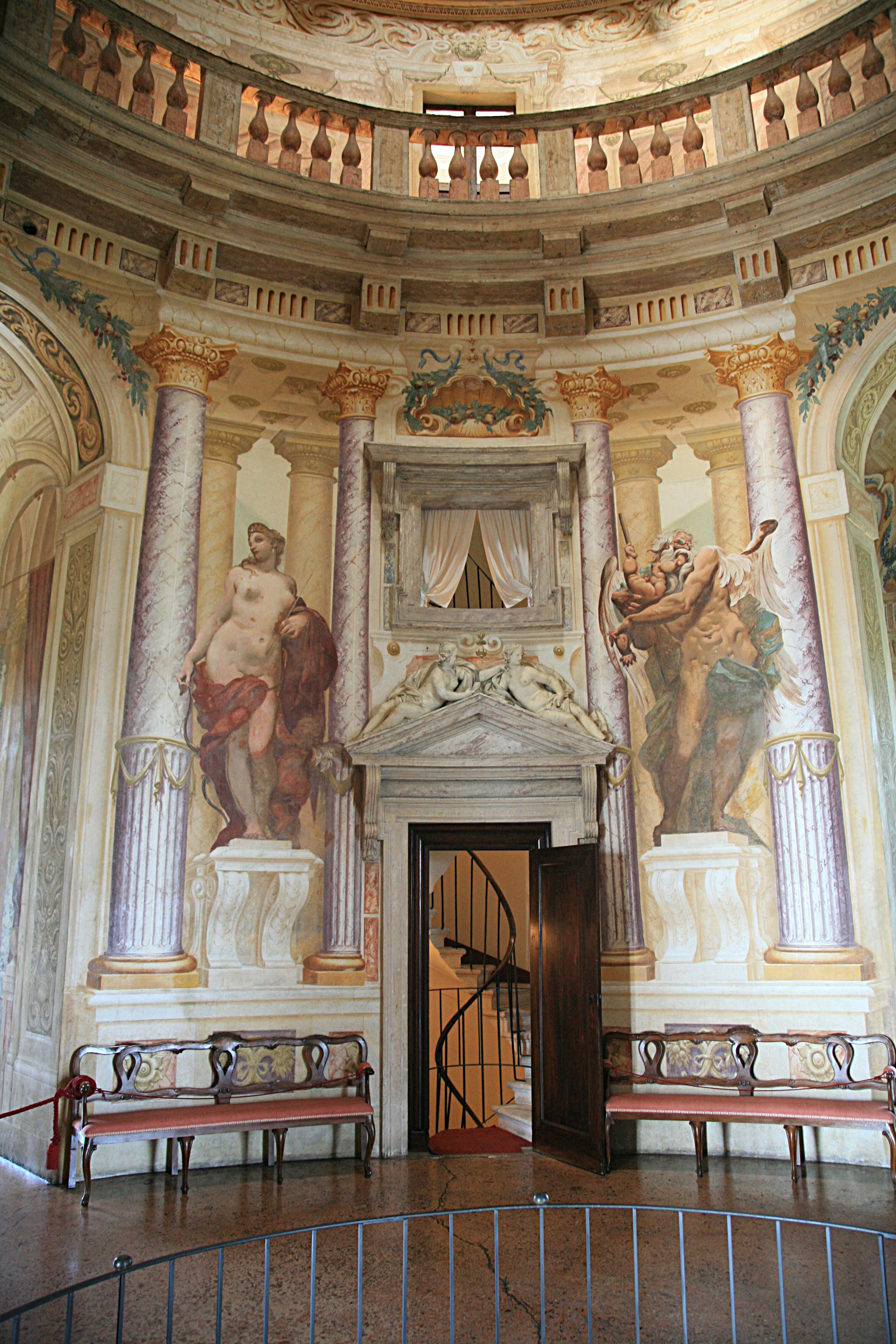
Trompe-l'œil in Villa Capra "La Rotonda" in Vicenza

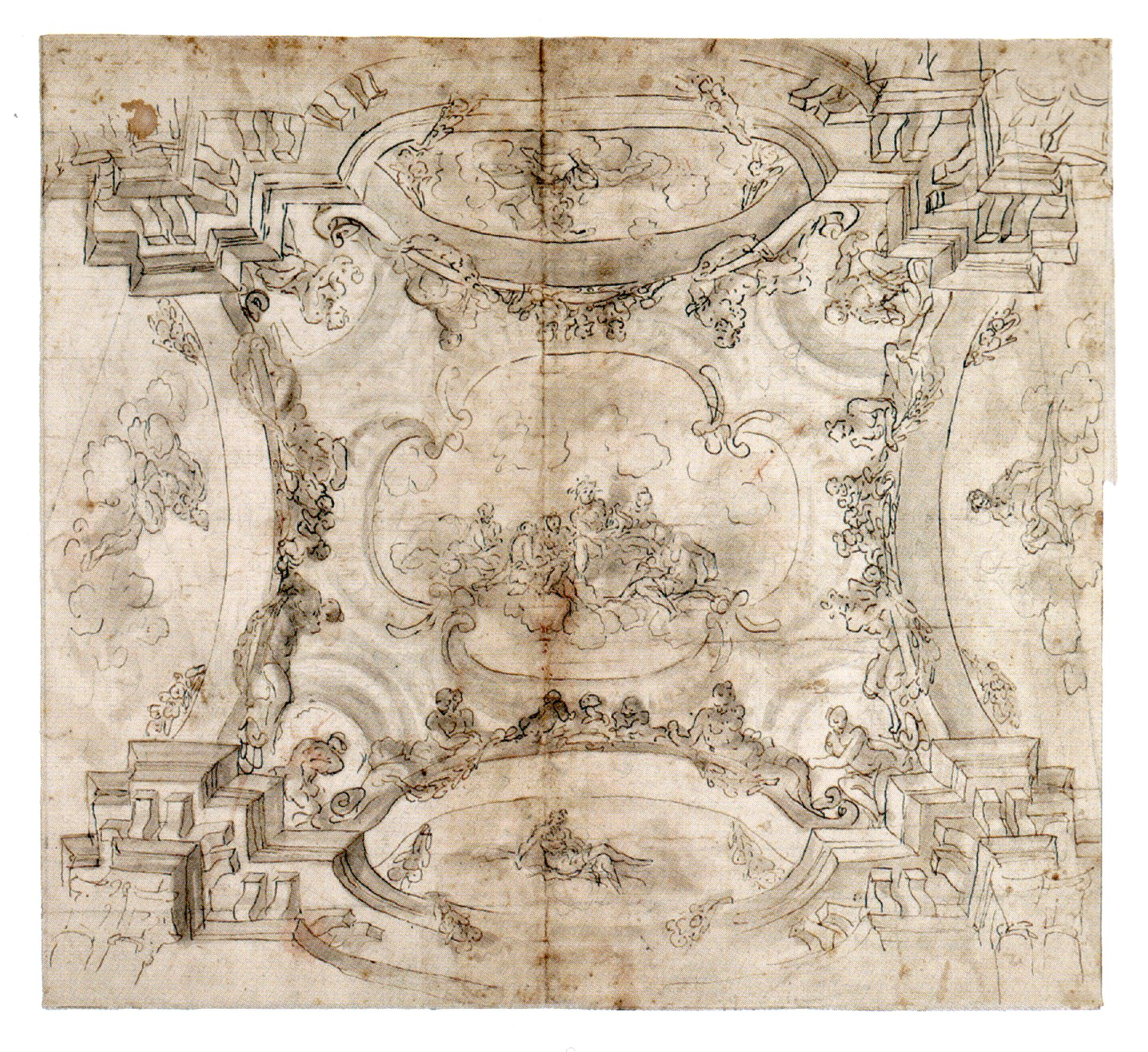
Apollo and Muses, drawing, Zagreb
