= Alfred Stucky =

Swiss engineer (1892–1969)

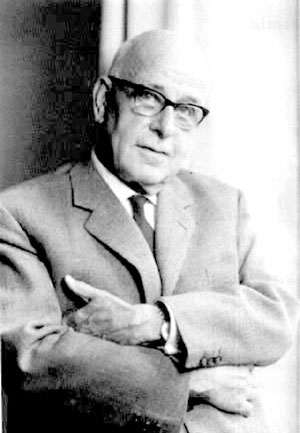
- Born: Alfred Stucky; 16 March 1892; La Chaux-de-Fonds
- Died: 6 September 1969 (aged 77); Lausanne
- Spouse: Nelly Mathis
- Children: 1
- Engineering career
- Discipline: Civil
- Institutions: Lausanne School of Engineering
- Projects: Montsalvens dam
- Significant design: Arch dams
- Significant advance: Elastic deformation

Alfred Stucky (16 March 1892 at La Chaux-de-Fonds - 6 September 1969 in Lausanne) was a Swiss engineer and academic who worked on hydraulic dam designs, specialising in arch dams. He founded the engineering firm Stucky SA in 1926; based in Renens in Switzerland, it has been part of the Gruner AG group since 2013.

== Education and early career ==
Drawn to technology from an early age, Stucky initially trained as a mechanic and later enrolled at the Swiss Federal Institute of Technology, Zurich to study civil engineering, and became interested in hydraulics.

He had internships with the Meyer office in Spiez, working on construction of the Zweisimmen to Lenk railway line, then with the company Favetto, Bosshard, Steiner & Co, which hired him during construction of the Lake Brienz railway.

== Lausanne School of Engineering and Stucky SA ==
From around 1915 (Note: Gruner sources suggest 1915; in his curriculum vitae in his 1922 doctoral thesis, Stucky said 1916.) to 1923, Stucky worked at the Basel office of Gruner AG, first as an assistant and later as head engineer and joint partner. At Gruner he developed calculation methods and introduced the parabolic shape and the notion of elastic deformation in double curvature arch dams during design of an arch dam impounding the Lac de Montsalvens reservoir in the Canton of Fribourg in Switzerland. He completed a doctoral thesis on arch dams in 1922. During construction of the Montsalvens dam, he met Jean Landry (fr:Jean Landry (ingénieur)), director of the School of Engineering of the University of Lausanne (today the École Polytechnique Fédérale de Lausanne), who offered him a position as lecturer in 1927. In the meantime, Stucky left Gruner and founded his own company, Stucky SA, in 1926 (after his death, it became part of the Gruner AG group in 2013, and rebranded to Gruner in 2022).

At the Lausanne School of Engineering, he founded the Hydraulic Testing Laboratory in 1928, then in 1935 the Geotechnical Laboratory. He was appointed a full professor in 1938. When Landry died in 1940, Stucky succeeded him as the head of the school. In 1943, he chaired the new school of architecture in the Canton of Vaud.

During his career, he participated in the construction of 38 dams, including 20 in Switzerland. Swiss dam projects included Dixence and Grande-Dixence, Mauvoisin (1951), Moiry (1954), and Luzzone (1958). He worked on dams in Greece, Iran (the Latyan dam), Romania, Algeria (the Beni-Bahdel and Meffrouch dams), Morocco and Tunisia (the Beni M'Tir or Ben Metir dam).

== Publications ==
In addition to his thesis, Stucky contributed to about 40 technical publications, including a reference work for specialists in concrete dams published in 1957 with Maurice-H. Derron, and a 1961 article (written with his son Jean-Pierre Stucky and E. Schnitzler), summarising his work on the Swiss dams of Châtelot, Mauvoisin, Moiry, Malvaglia, Nalps, Luzzone, Limmern and Tourtemagne.

== Personal life ==
He married Nelly Mathis, the daughter of an architect. They had a son, Jean-Pierre Stucky, who also taught in the civil engineering department of the École Polytechnique Fédérale in Lausanne, specialising in reinforced concrete. Alfred Stucky died of bronchopneumonia in Lausanne on 6 September 1969, aged 77.

== Legacy ==
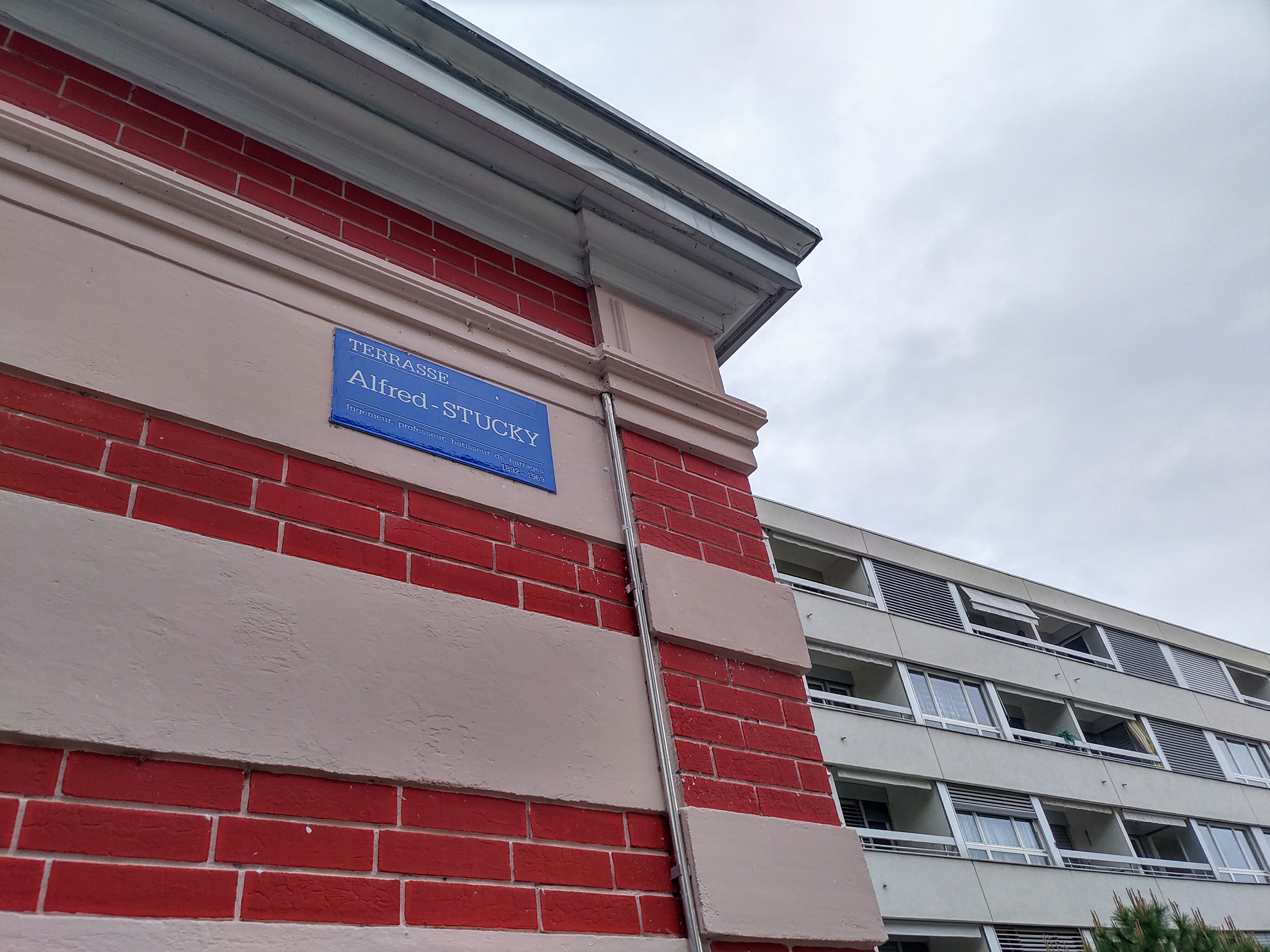
Terrasse Alfred-Stucky Lausanne

A street in Lausanne, Terrasse Alfred Stucky, bears his name.

The École Polytechnique Fédérale de Lausanne commemorates Stucky with the Alfred Stucky Award, awarded to civil engineering students for the best Masters thesis.
