= Gruner AG =

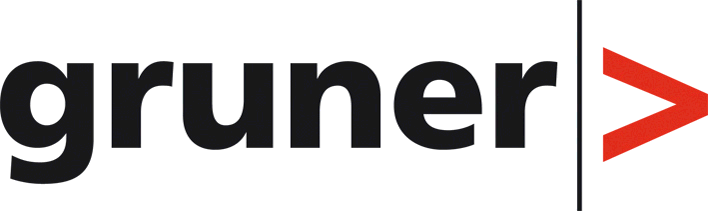
- Company type: Joint-stock company
- Industry: Engineers and planners
- Founded: 1862
- Headquarters: Basel, Switzerland
- Key people: Thomas Ernst (President of the Board of Directors) Olivier Aebi, CEO
- Number of employees: over 1100 employees (January 2024)
- Website: http://www.gruner.ch/en

Gruner AG, with headquarters in Basel, is a Swiss engineering services company for private and public clients. In the Building Construction, Infrastructure and Energy business areas, Gruner advises and supports clients from strategic planning and commissioning through to the management of buildings building construction and infrastructure. With around 1100 employees from 49 nations, Gruner is represented at over 30 sites in Switzerland, Europe and internationally.

== History ==
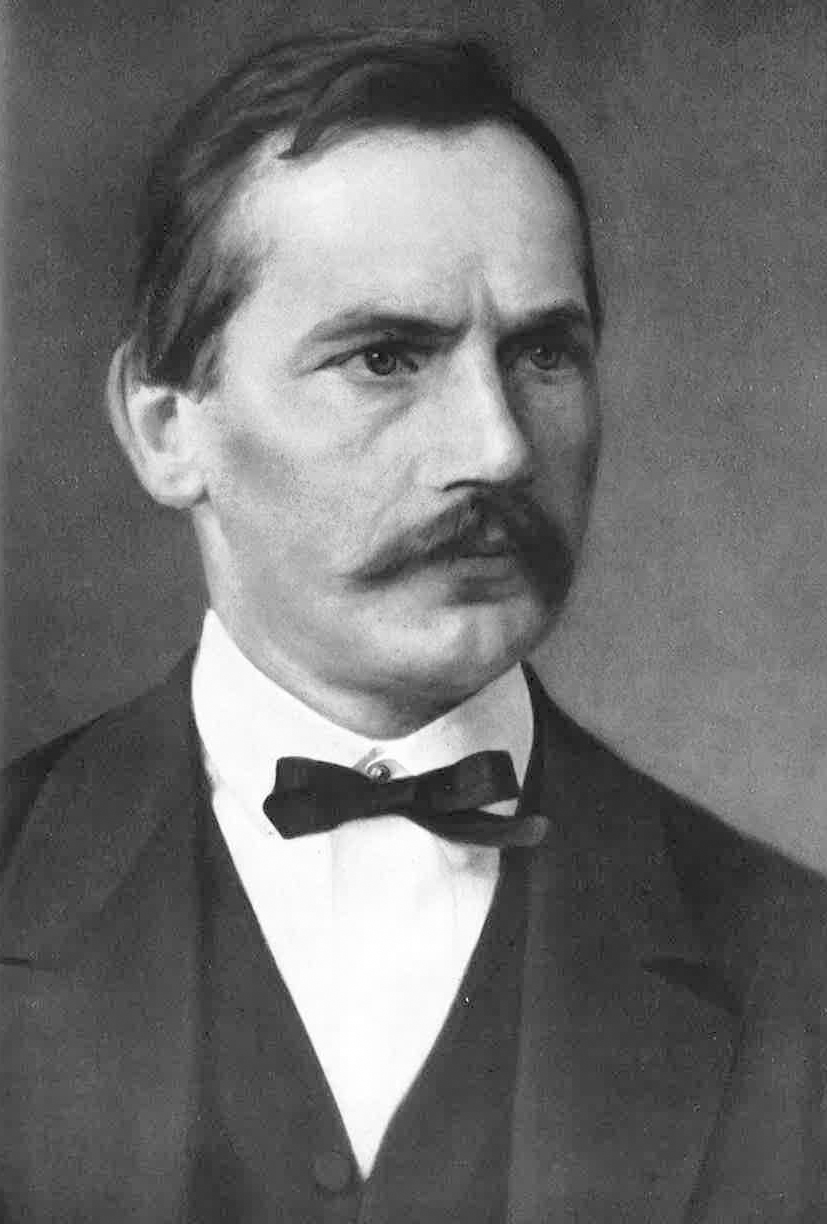
Carl Heinrich Gruner

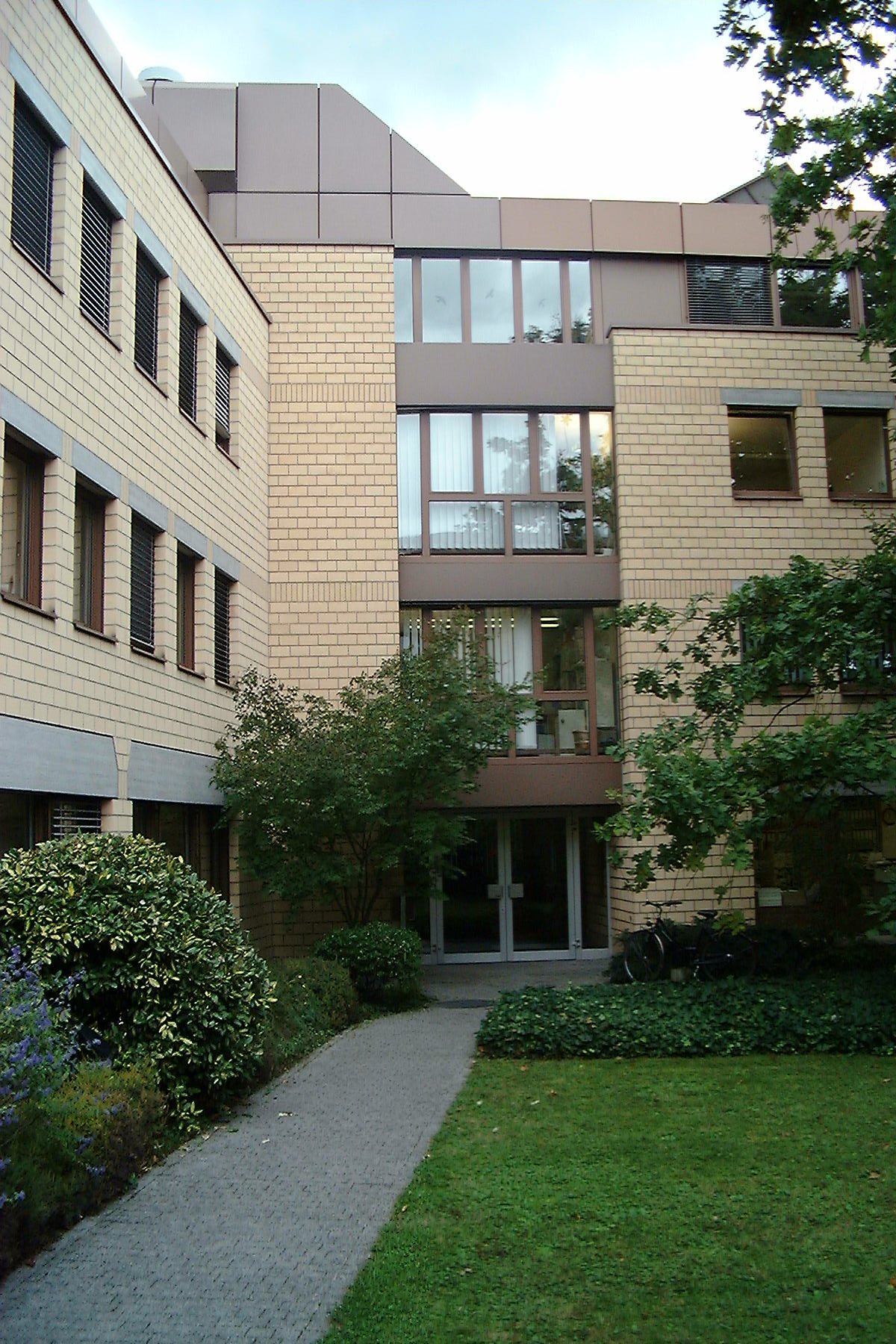
Gruner AG headquarters in Gellertstrasse, Basel

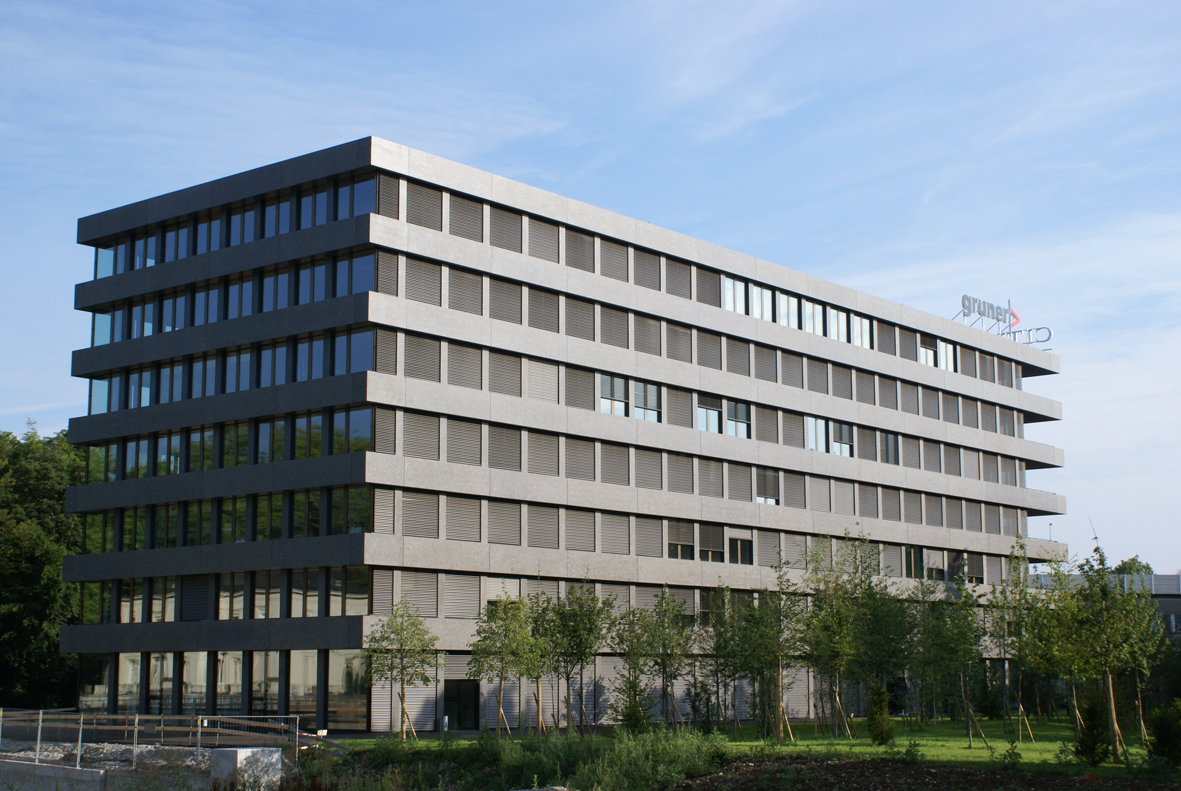
Citygate completed in 2010 as the second site in Basel

It was founded in 1862 by Carl Heinrich Gruner in Basel with a focus on water supply. He specialized in setting up gas stations and urban water utilities. The era of hydraulic engineering was started by Henry Eduard Gruner under the name of "Ingenieurbüro Dr. Gruner" in 1898. The next 40 years, the company was almost exclusively involved in the field of hydraulic engineering, hydropower plants and high dams worldwide. In the 1930s, his son, Edward Gruner drafted the idea of the Gotthard Base Tunnel, which he published in 1947 in his essay titled "Journey through the Gotthard Base Tunnel." George Gruner, the grandson of the founder, joined the office in 1938. This marked the onset of civil engineering activities in construction works. In 1942 was the foundation of Ingenieurbüro Dr. HE Gruner + Sohn (Engineering Office). In 1948, the company was renamed to Gebrüder Gruner, following the death of their father, Henry. This was followed by civil engineering work. In 1950, transportation planning was included as a new business area. In 1970, the company was restructured into a corporation (Gruner AG). In 1974 was the establishment of the subsidiary, Gruneko AG, which focused on energy economics and covered the areas of facilities engineering and energy installations.

In 1979, Böhringer AG became part of the Gruner Group in the business areas of local and regional civil engineering, utilities and waste management. 1980 witnessed the establishment of the Environmental Division. The companies, Tausky Leu Müller, Heinzelmann AG and Uli Lippuner AG became members of the Gruner Group between 1985 and 1990. In 1992, the subsidiary, Lüem AG was founded. In 1993, Gruner + Partner GmbH was founded in Leipzig. In the year 2000 was the establishment of the General Planning and Safety Divisions. The subsidiary, Tausky Leu Mueller, Bauingenieure AG was renamed to Gruner AG Ingenieure und Planer (Consulting Engineers) in 2001. Frey Strub AG became a subsidiary of Heinzelmann AG in 2001. Heinzelmann AG was renamed to Gruner Ingenieure AG in 2005. Likewise, in 2005, Berchtold + Eicher Bauingenieure AG became a member of the Gruner Group. Roschi + Partner AG, operating in facilities engineering and energy consultancy, was integrated into the Gruner Group in 2006. The companies of the Wepf Group were merged with Gruner + Wepf Ingenieure AG, St. Gallen and Gruner + Wepf Ingenieure AG, Zurich in 2008. Similarly, Gruner GmbH was founded in Vienna to increase its presence in Austria. The engineering firm, H. Tanner became a subsidiary of Gruner AG Ingenieure AG in 2009. That same year, Gruner International Ltd. was established to enhance international business. Kiwi Systemingenieure und Berater AG became a member of the Gruner Group in 2011. With the founding of Gruner Peru S.A.C. in Lima, the Group gains its first foothold in Peru. In 2012 the Gruner Group celebrates 150 years in business. In 2013 Stucky SA is integrated into the Gruner Group. The two time-honoured companies have historical links: Alfred Stucky, who founded the engineering company bearing his name in 1926, worked at Gruner in Basel from 1917 to 1923, first as an assistant and later as head engineer and joint partner. In the same year Gruner establishes a company in Stuttgart for the provision of fire safety solutions: Gruner GmbH Stuttgart. In 2014 the member companies of the Gruner Group in locations all around the world all operate under the Gruner brand, since 2022 also Stucky SA.

== Sites ==
- Switzerland: Aarau, Appenzell, Basel, Berneck, Brugg, Degersheim, Flawil, Fribourg, Köniz, Luzern, Martigny, Oberwil BL, Renens VD, Roggwil TG, Stein AG, St. Gallen, Teufen AR, Wil SG, Zollikofen, Zug, Zurich
- Europe/International: Ankara (TR), Belgrade (SR), Berlin (D), Chemnitz (D), Cologne (D), Hamburg (D), Kiel (D), Leipzig (D), Munich (D), Stuttgart (D), Tbilisi (GE), Vienna (A)

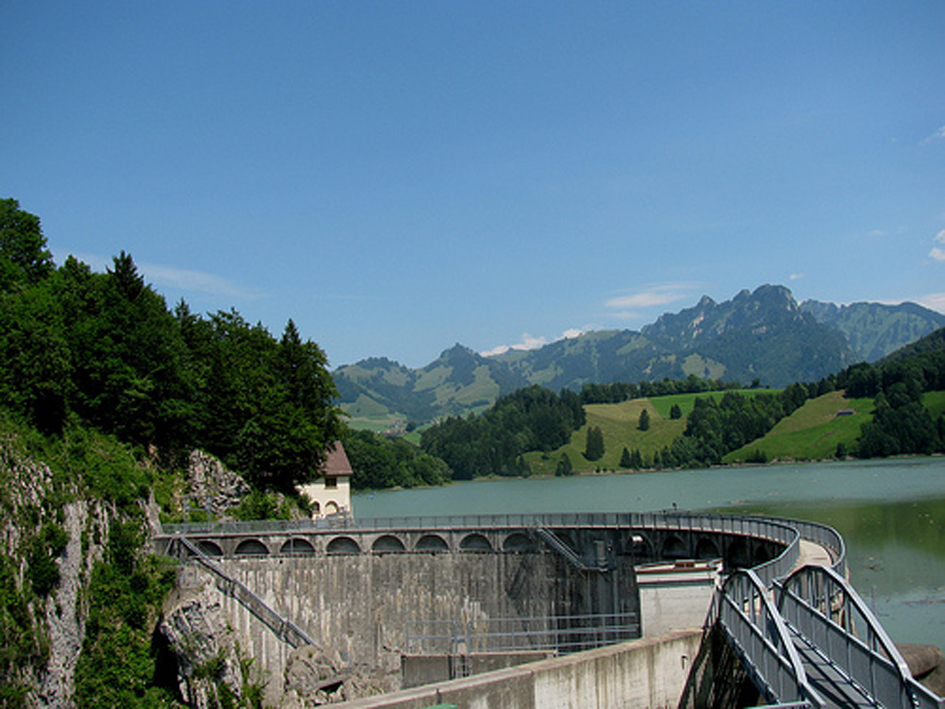
Montsalvens arch dam (civil engineering)

== Projects ==
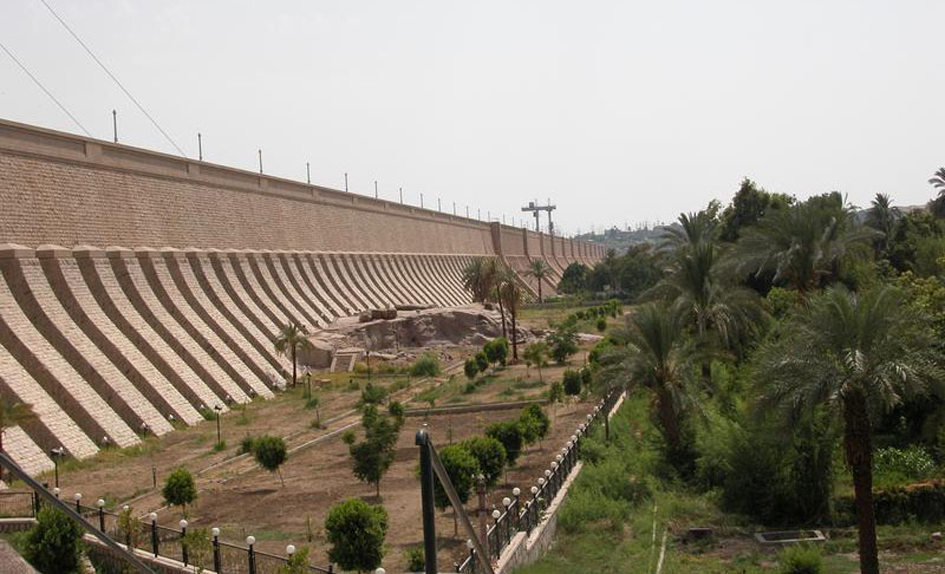
The Aswan high dam

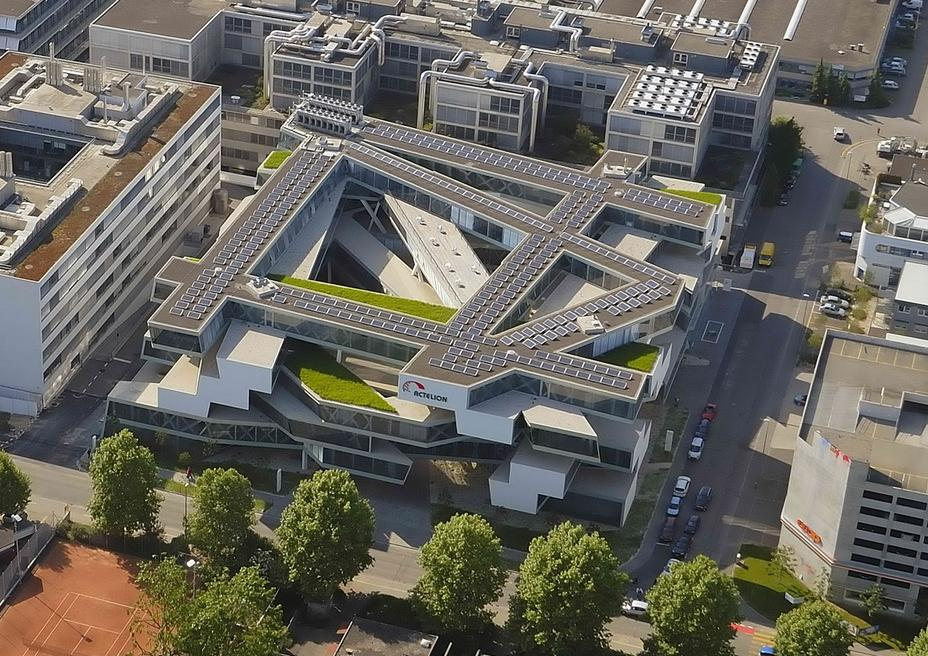
Aerial view of the Actelion building in Allschwil, Switzerland

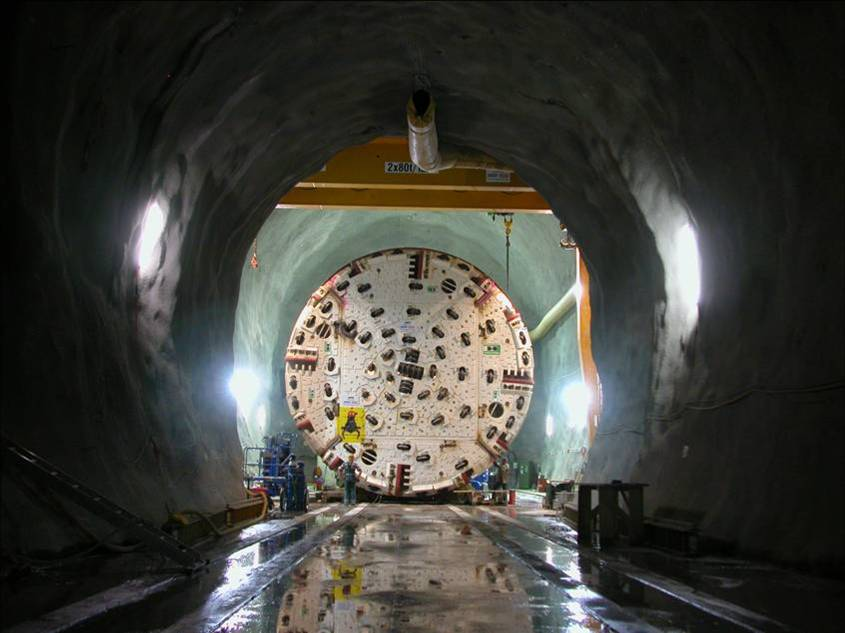
The Gotthard base tunnel under construction

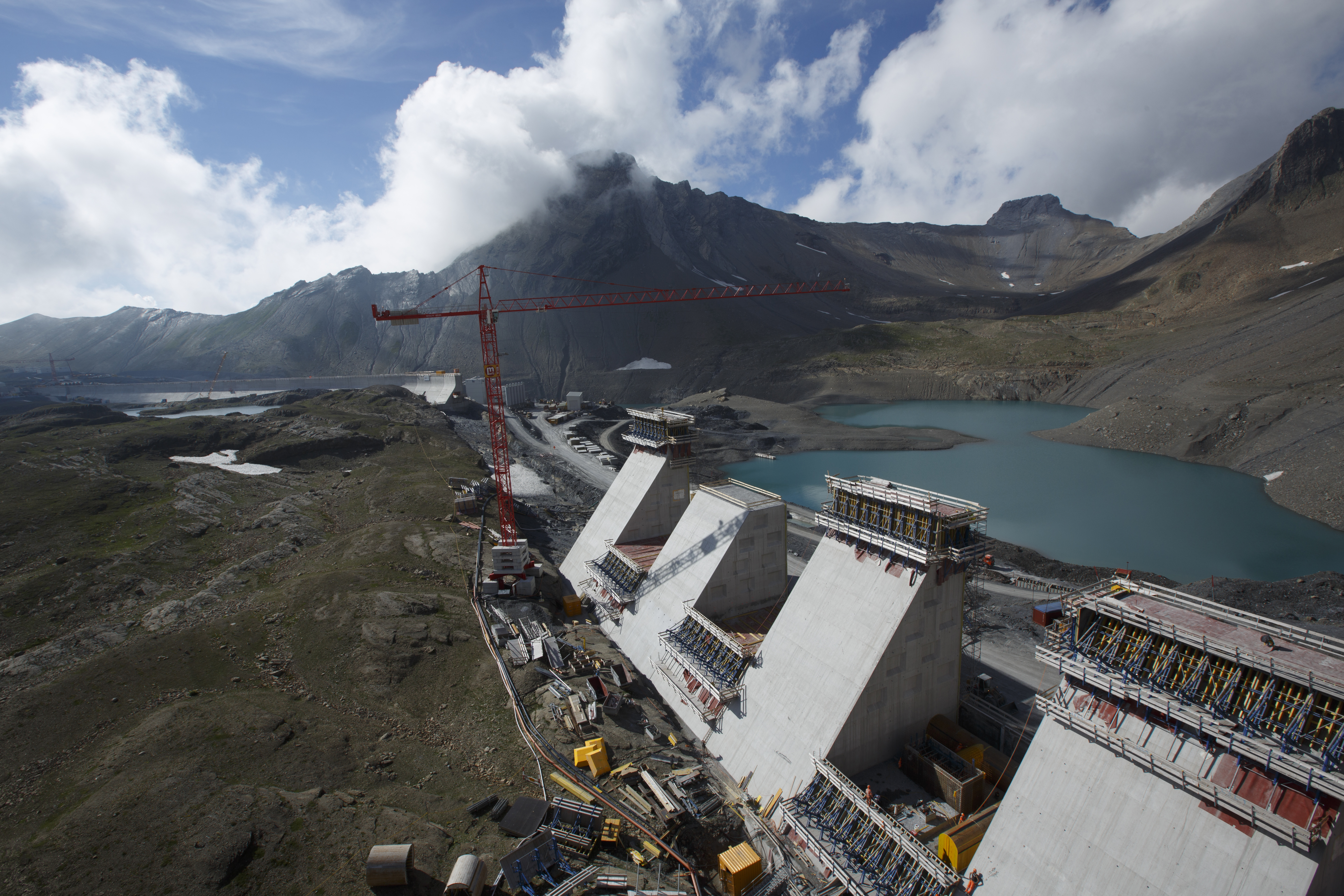
Muttsee dam, Glarus Alps

- Montsalvens arch dam, 1920
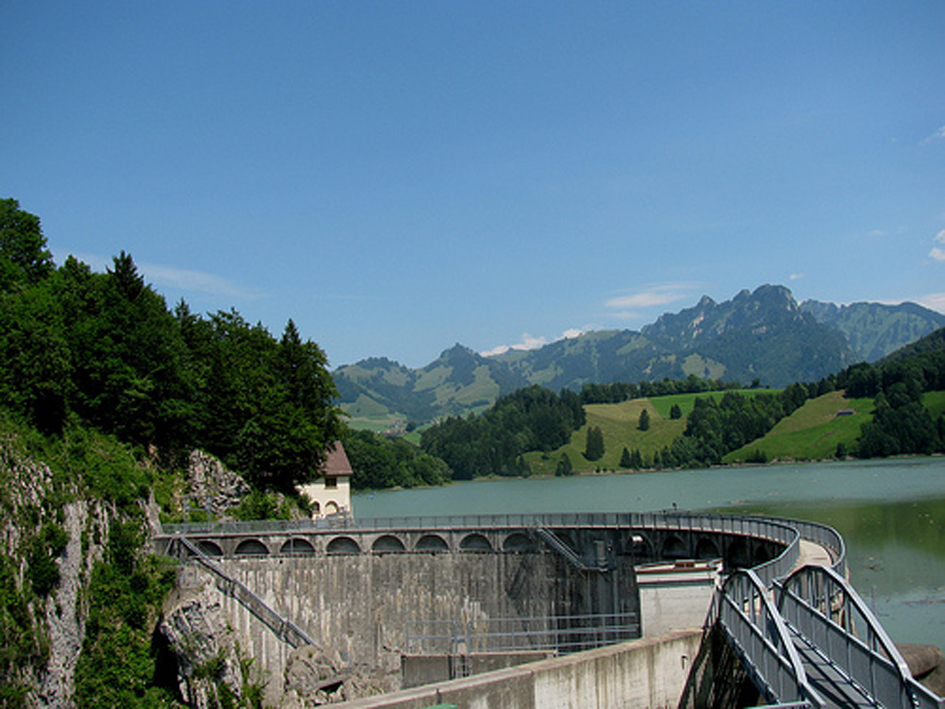
  Montsalvens arch dam, 1920
- Rheinkraftwerk Albbruck-Dogern, 1933/2009
- EuroAirport Basel-Mulhouse-Freiburg, 1949/1969
- Aswan High Dam, 1952
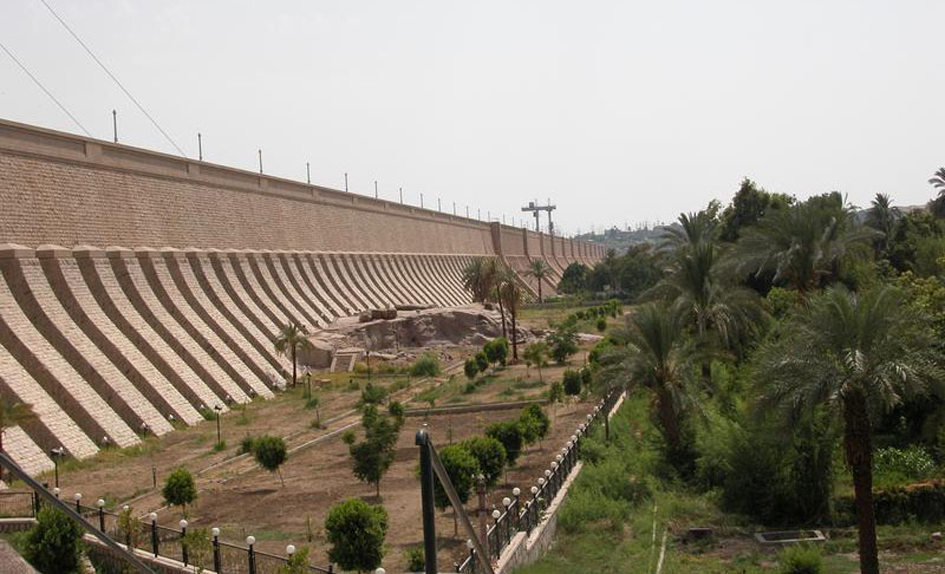
  Aswan high dam, 1952
- Konar Dam, India, 1964
- Ciba high-rise building, Basel, 1964
- Waste incinerator (WI), Basel, 1967-1969
- Bank for International Settlements - BIZ, Basel, 1976
- Cement Factory Al Ain, UAE, 1978-1980
- Laboratory building, Abu Dhabi, 1982
- Schilthorn, 1988
- Geothermal Riehen, 1988
- Central heating plant, Basel, 1988/1989
- Pradella power station, 1990
- Wastewater Treatment Plant (WWTP) Sissach, 1990-1994
- Canton hospital Liestal, 1990-2002
- Nordtangente highway, Basel, 1994
- Gotthard Base Tunnel north, 1994-2010
- Central railway parking Basel, 1995-1999
- Chienberg tunnel, Sissach, 1996-2004
- Rhine bridge Laufenburg, 2002-2004
- Ultra-Brag AG, Basel, 2007-2009
- Futuro, Liestal, 2007-2009
- Actelion Pharmaceuticals Ltd, Allschwil, 2007/2011
- West Zurich, 2008-2011
- Prime Tower, Zurich, 2009/2010
- New building of Basel Fair, 2010-2013
- Muttsee dam, Glarner Alps, 2009-2015
- The circle @ Zurich Airport, 2015-2018
- Cambambe arch dam, Angola, 2013
- Grosspeter Tower, Basel, 2013-2016
- Children's Hospital Zurich, 2012-2021
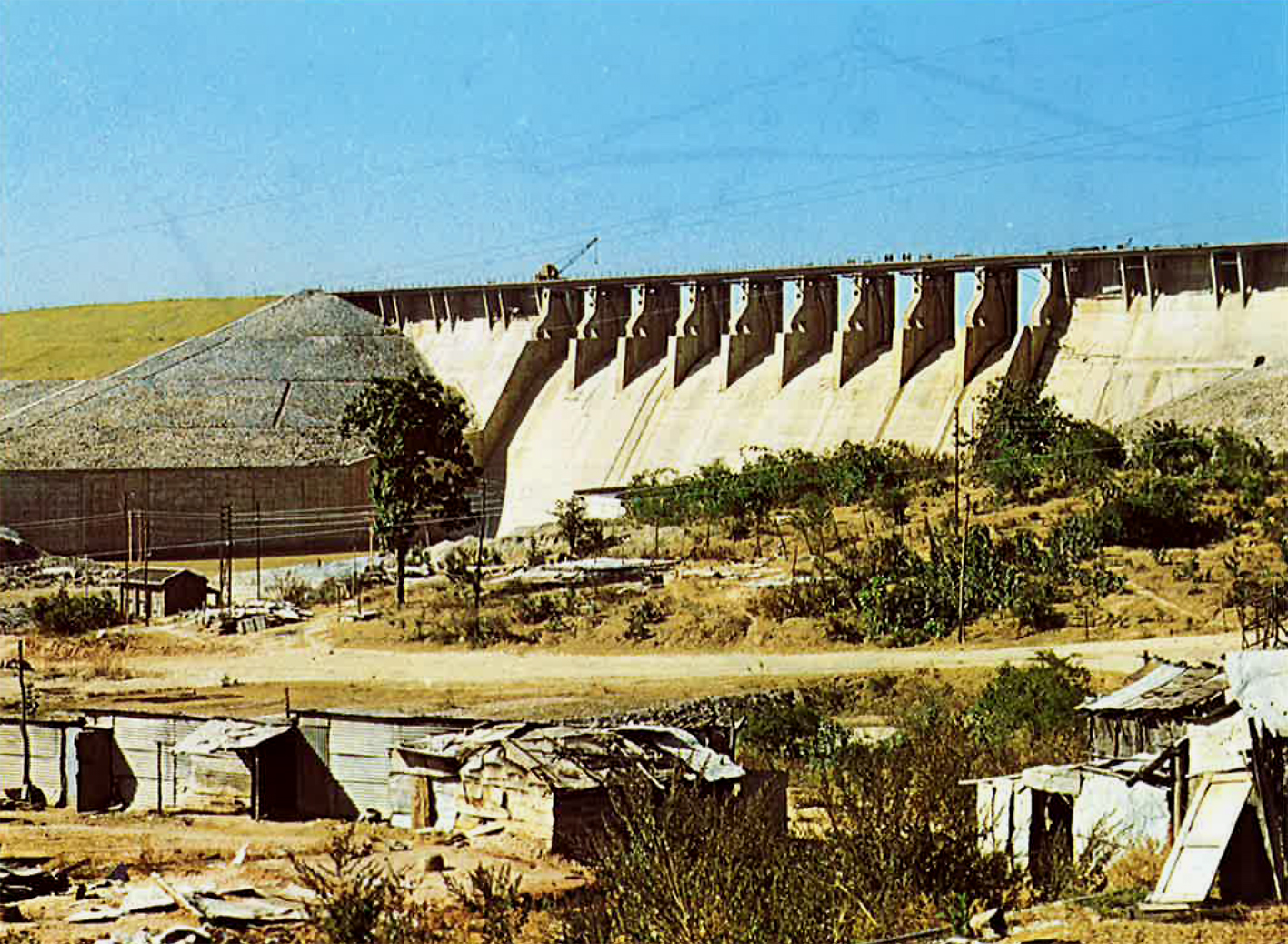
Konar dam, India,1964

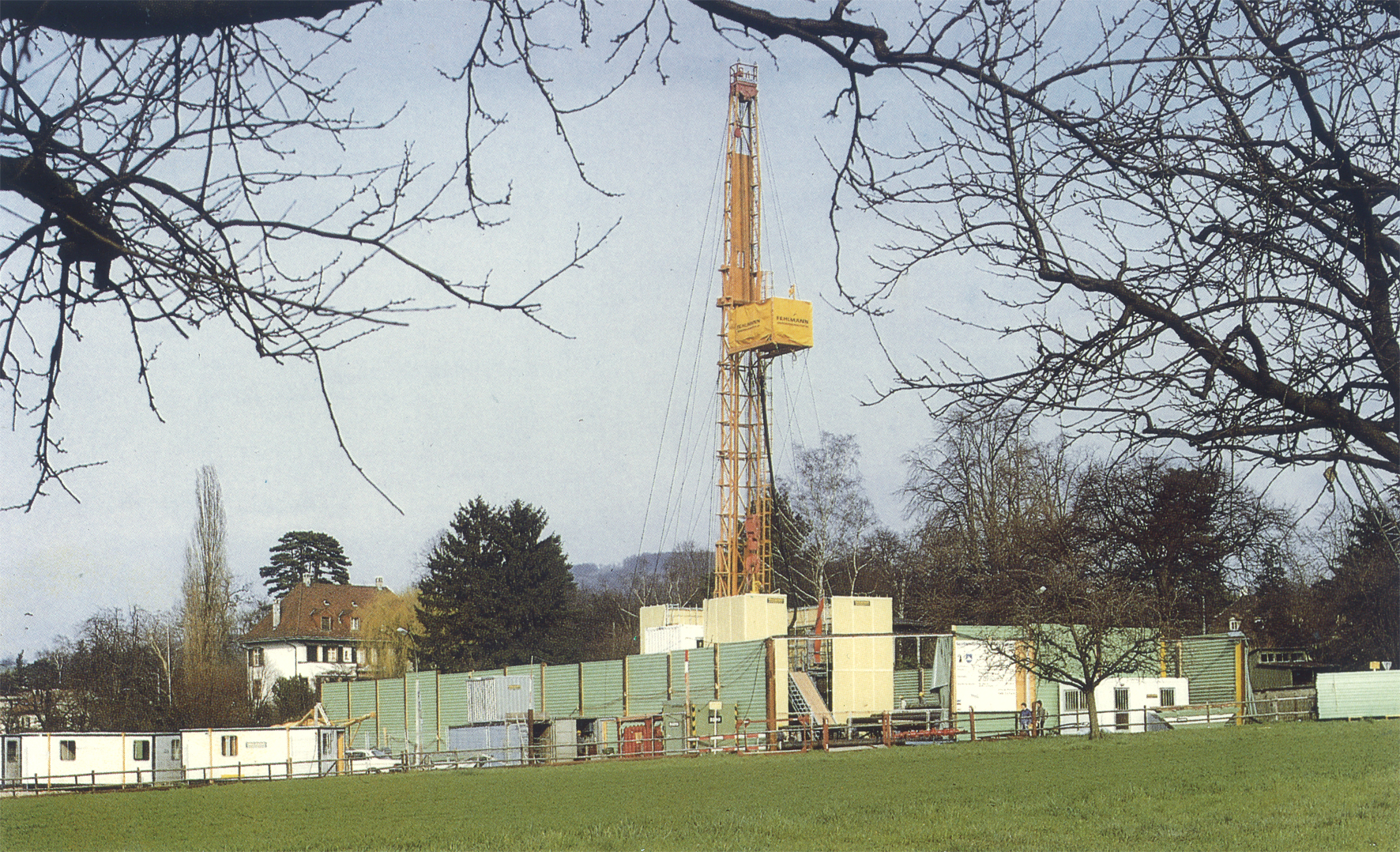
Geothermal Riehen, 1988

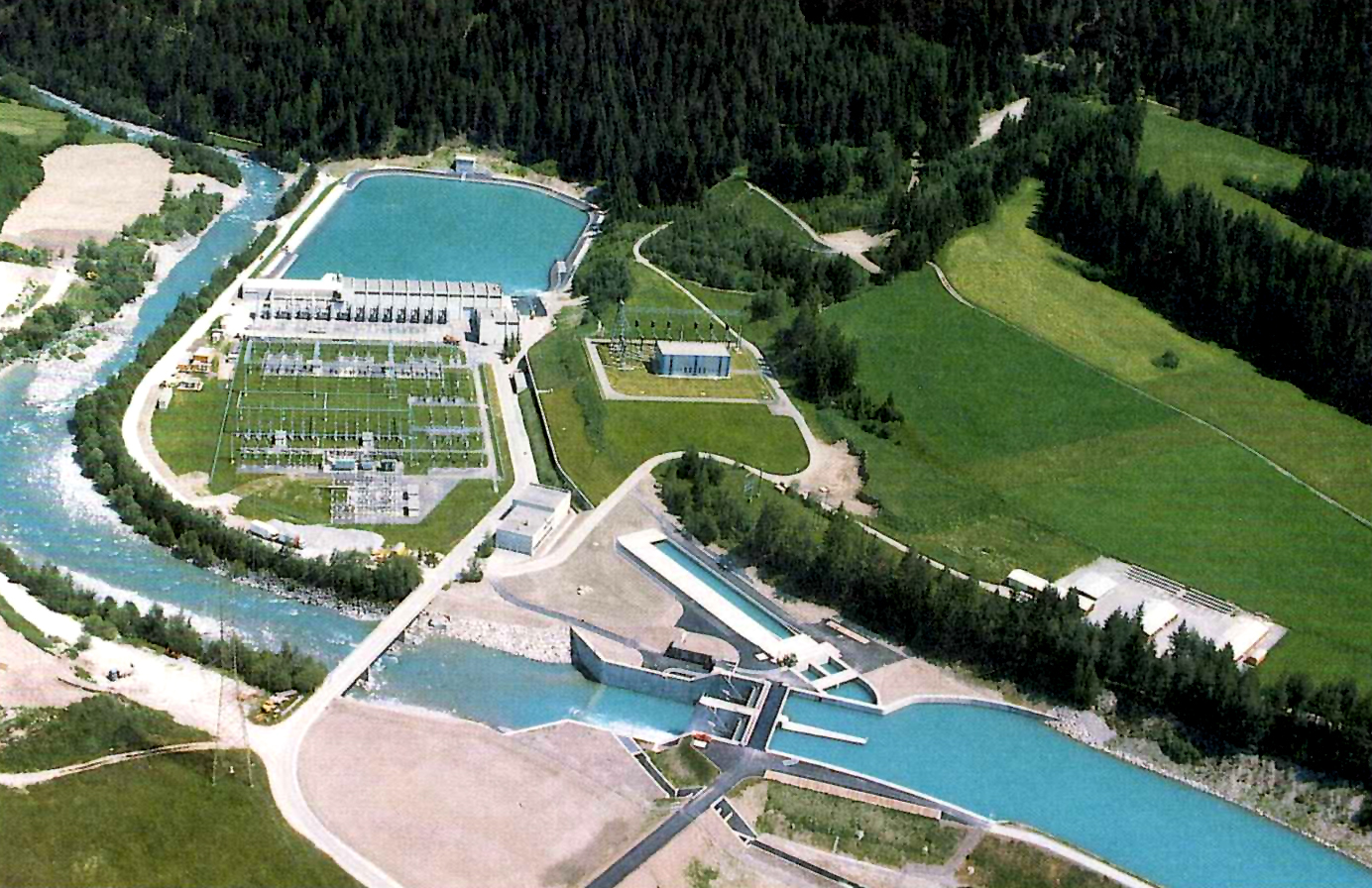
Pradella power station, 1990

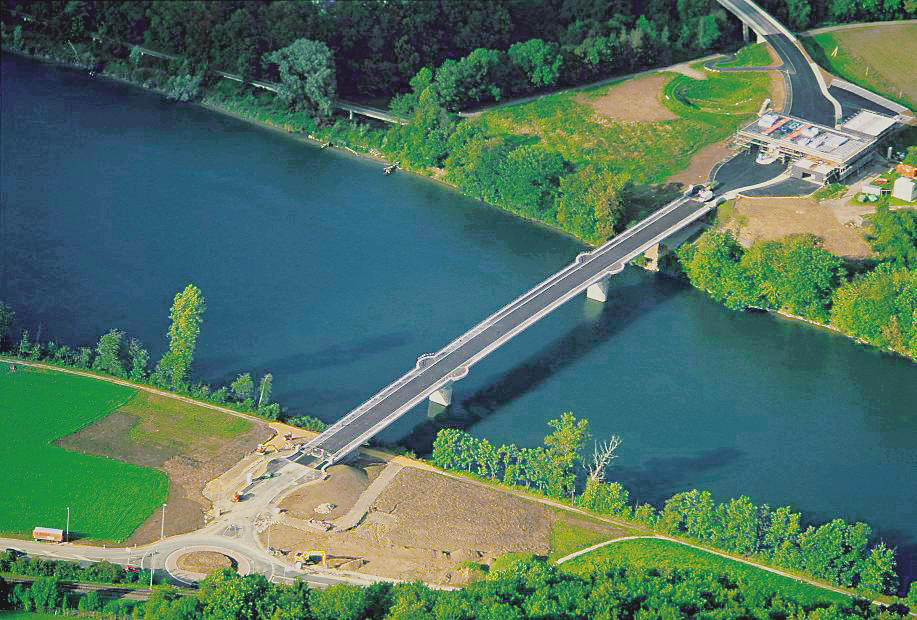
Rhine bridge Laufenburg, 2002-2004

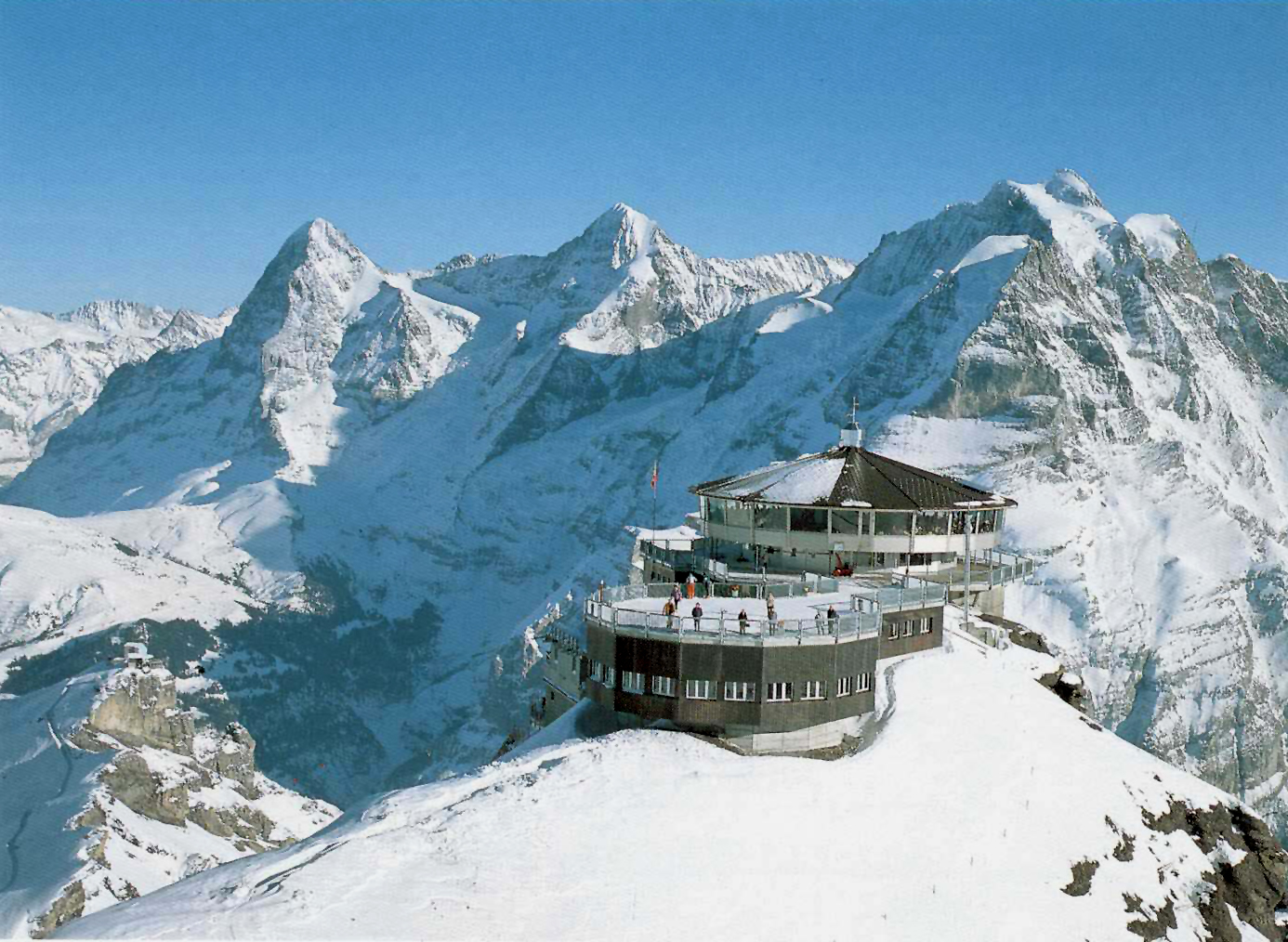
The summit station on Schilthorn, 1988

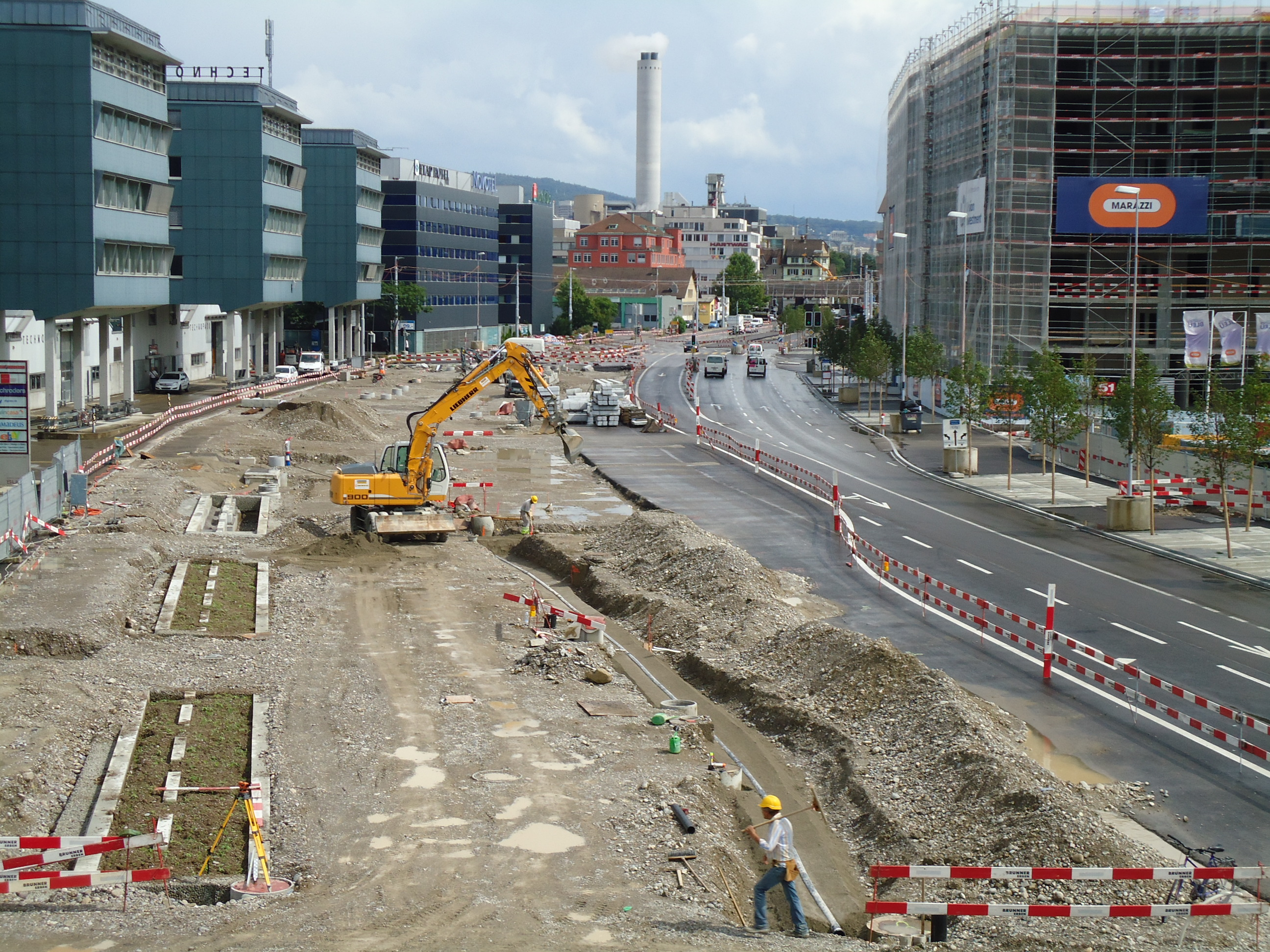
West Zurich, 2008-2011
