= Kebar =

== Geography ==
- Kebar Dam, an early arch dam in Iran, located by the Kebar River
- Kebar or Chebar River, also known as Kebar Canal, in the vicinity of Tel Abib, mentioned in the Biblical book of Ezekiel
- Kebar Valley, located in Southwest Papua
- Kebar District, a Town and District located in the Tambrauw Regency of Southwest Papua
- Djebel el Kébar, District mountain in central Tunisia

== Other ==
- Mpur language, also known as Kebar, a language of West Papua
- Kebar airport, located in West Papua
- SS West Kebar, an American cargo ship sunk in World War II
- KEBAR, a record label of the Jamaican duo Keith & Tex
