= Arch dam =

Type of curved concrete dam

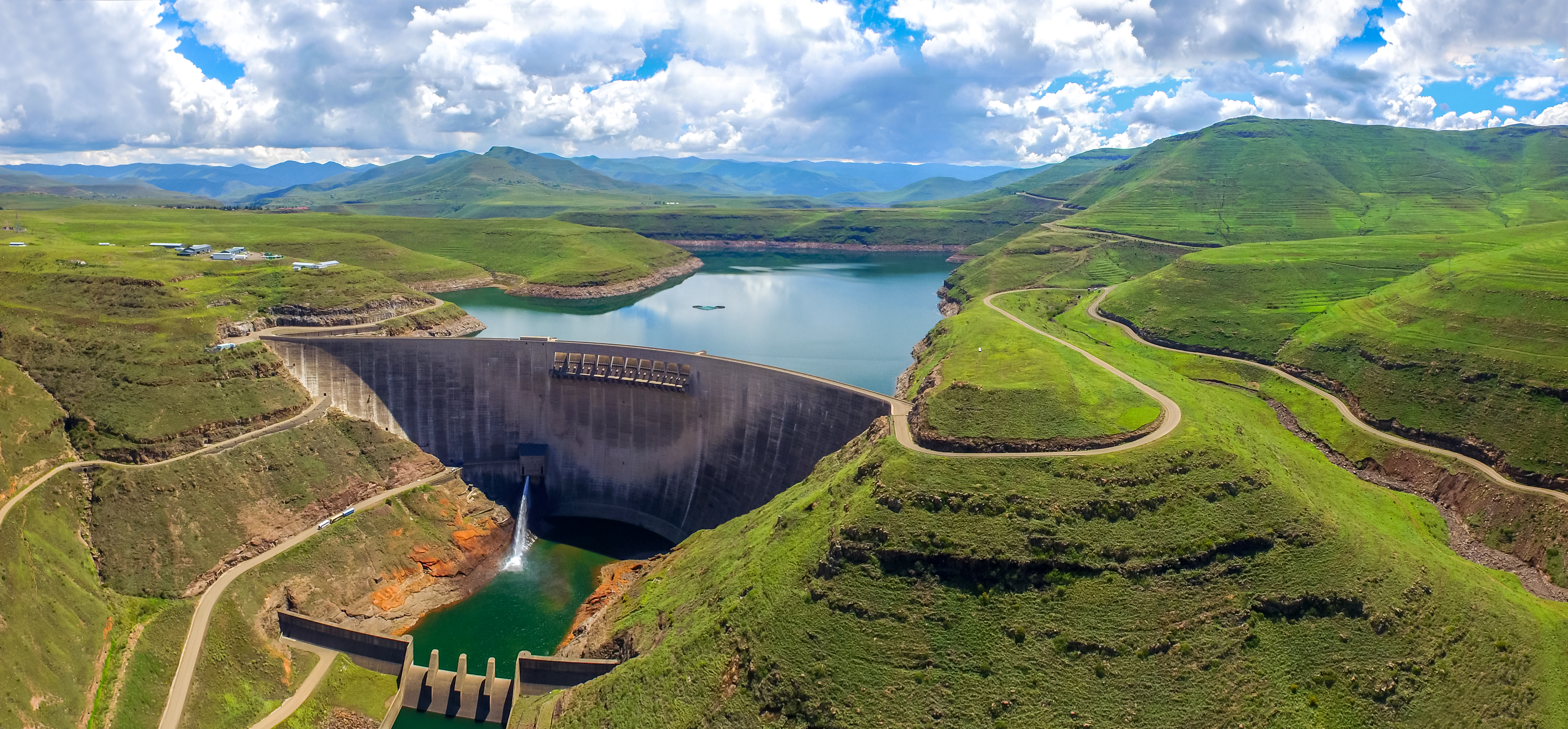
The Katse Dam, a 185 m high concrete arch dam in Lesotho

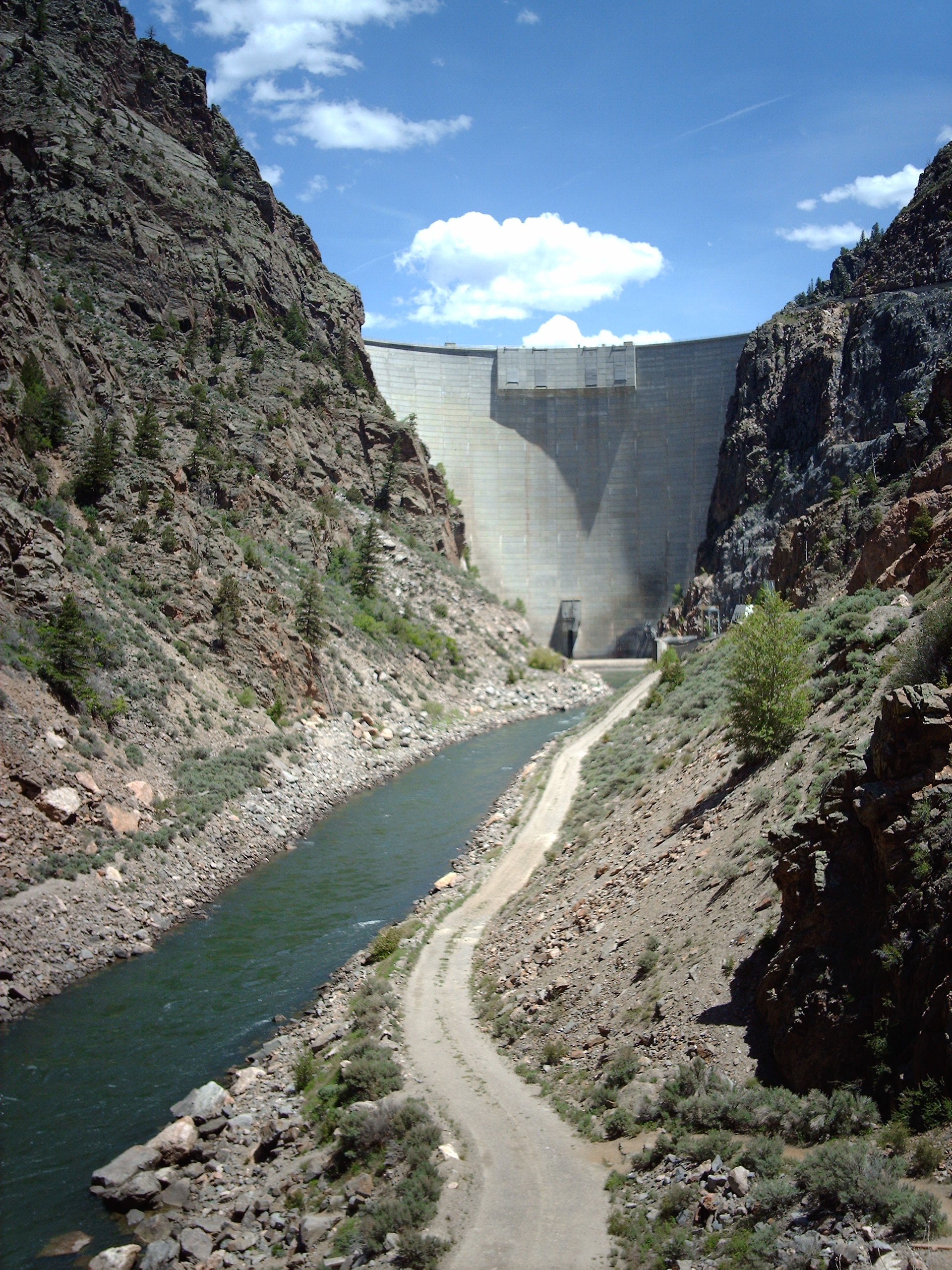
The Morrow Point Dam is a double-curvature arch dam

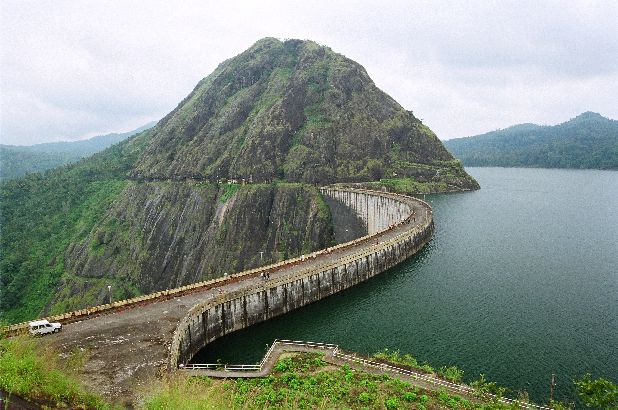
The Idukki Dam in Kerala, India, is a double-curvature arch dam.

An arch dam is a concrete dam that is curved upstream in plan. The arch dam is designed so that the force of the water against it, known as hydrostatic pressure, presses against the arch, causing the arch to straighten slightly and strengthening the structure as it pushes into its foundation or abutments. An arch dam is most suitable for narrow canyons or gorges with steep walls of stable rock to support the structure and stresses. Since they are thinner than any other dam type, they require much less construction material, making them economical and practical in remote areas.

== History ==
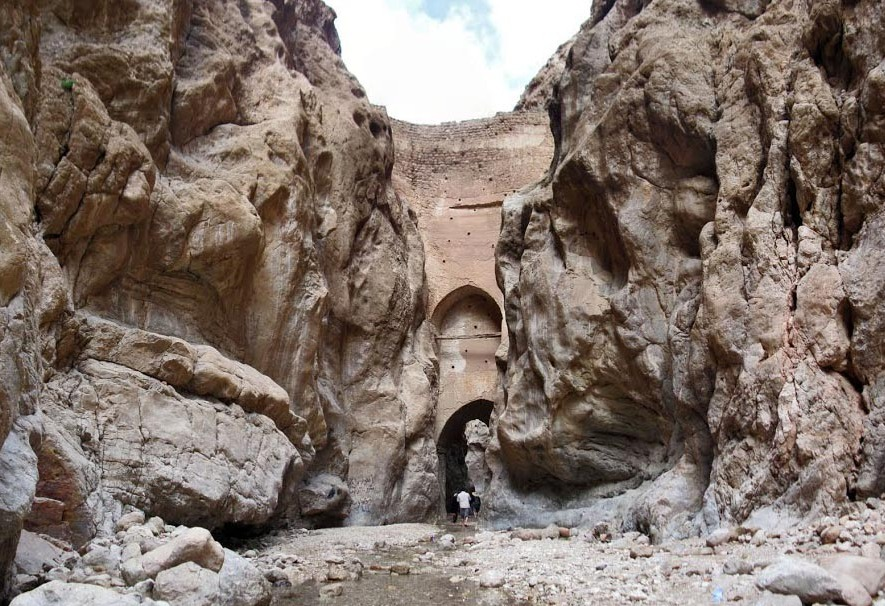
Shāh Abbās Arch near Kurit Dam – 14th century

The development of arch dams throughout history began with the Romans. The first known arch dam, the Glanum Dam, also known as the Vallon de Baume Dam, was built by the Romans in France and it dates back to the 1st century BC. The dam was about 12 metres (39 ft) high and 18 metres (59 ft) in length. Its radius was about 14 m (46 ft), and it consisted of two masonry walls. The Romans built it to supply nearby Glanum with water. The Monte Novo Dam in Portugal was another early arch dam built by the Romans in 300 AD. It was 5.7 metres (19 ft) high and 52 m (171 ft) long, with a radius of 19 m (62 ft). The curved ends of the dam met with two winged walls that were later supported by two buttresses. The dam also contained two water outlets to drive mills downstream.

The earliest known surviving arch dam is the Iron Gate above Antioch, which combined the functionalities of a road bridge, an aqueduct bridge, a city wall, and a dam. The Iron Gate still functions as a dam in the present day. The Dara Dam was another arch dam built by the Romans. The historian Procopius wrote of its design: "This barrier was not built in a straight line, but was bent into the shape of a crescent, so that the curve, by lying against the current of the river, might be able to offer still more resistance to the force of the stream."

The Mongols also built arch dams in modern-day Iran. Their earliest was the Kebar Dam built around 1300, which was 26 m (85 ft) high and 55 m (180 ft) long, and had a radius of 35 m (115 ft). Their second dam was built around 1350 and is called the Kurit Dam. After 4 m (13 ft) was added to the dam in 1850, it became 64 m (210 ft) tall and remained the tallest dam in the world until the early 20th century. The Kurit Dam was of masonry design and built in a very narrow canyon. The canyon was so narrow that its crest length is only 44% of its height. The dam is still erect, even though part of its lower downstream face fell off.

The Tibi Dam in Tibi, Spain was a post-medieval arch dam built between 1579 and 1594 and the first in Europe since the Romans. The dam was 42.7 metres (140 ft) high and 65 metres (213 ft) long. This arch dam rests on the mountains sides.

In the early 20th century, the world's first variable-radius arch dam was built on the Salmon Creek near Juneau, Alaska. The Salmon Creek Dam's upstream face bulged upstream, which relieved pressure on the stronger, curved lower arches near the abutments. The dam also had a larger toe, which off-set pressure on the upstream heel of the dam, which now curved more downstream. The technology and economical benefits of the Salmon Creek Dam allowed for larger and taller dam designs. The dam was, therefore, revolutionary, and similar designs were soon adopted around the world, in particular by the U.S. Bureau of Reclamation.

In 1920, the Swiss engineer and dam designer Alfred Stucky developed new calculation methods for arch dams, introducing the concept of elasticity during the construction of the Montsalvens arch dam in Switzerland, thereby improving the dam profile in the vertical direction by using a parabolic arch shape instead of a circular arch shape.

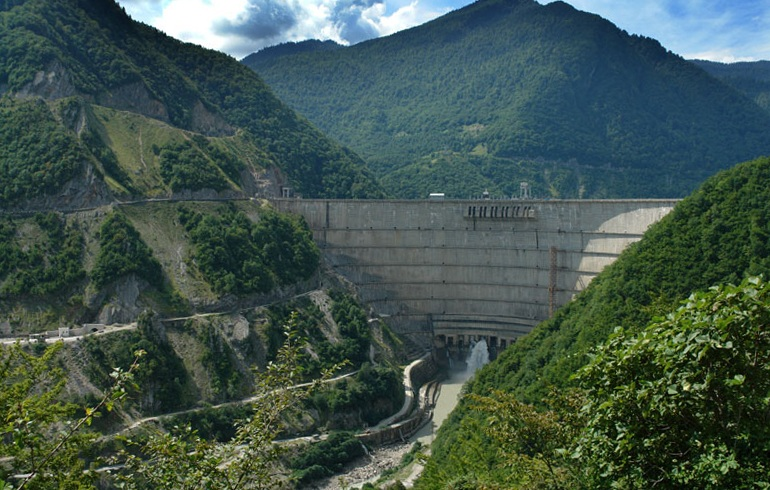
The Enguri Dam in the Caucasus of Georgia

Pensacola Dam, completed in the state of Oklahoma in 1940, was considered the longest multiple arch dam in the United States. Designed by W. R. Holway, it has 51 arches. and a maximum height of 150 ft (46 m) above the river bed. The total length of the dam and its sections is 6,565 ft (2,001 m) while the multiple-arch section is 4,284 ft (1,306 m) long and its combination with the spillway sections measure 5,145 ft (1,568 m). Each arch in the dam has a clear span of 60 ft (18 m) and each buttress is 24 ft (7.3 m) wide.

Arch dam designs would continue to test new limits and designs such as the double- and multiple-curve. Alfred Stucky and the U.S. Bureau of Reclamation developed a method of weight and stress distribution in the 1960s, and arch dam construction in the United States would see its last surge then with dams like the 143-meter double-curved Morrow Point Dam in Colorado, completed in 1968. By the late 20th century, arch dam design reached a relative uniformity in design around the world. Currently, the tallest arch dam in the world is the 305 metres (1,001 ft) Jingpin-I Dam in China, which was completed in 2013. The longest multiple arch with buttress dam in the world is the Daniel-Johnson Dam in Quebec, Canada. It is 214 meters (702 ft) high and 1,314 meters (4,311 ft) long across its crest. It was completed in 1968 and put in service in 1970.

Pensacola Dam was one of the last multiple arch types built in the United States. Its NRHP application states that this was because three dams of this type failed: (1) Gem Lake Dam, St. Francis Dam (California), Lake Hodges Dam (California). None of these failures were inherently caused by the multiple arch design.

== Design ==
The design of an arch dam is a very complex process. It starts with an initial dam layout, that is continually improved until the design objectives are achieved within the design criteria.

=== Loads ===
The main loads for which an arch dam is designed are:

- Dead load
- Hydrostatic load generated by the reservoir and the tailwater
- Temperature load
- Earthquake load

Other miscellaneous loads that affect a dam include: ice and silt loads, and uplift pressure.

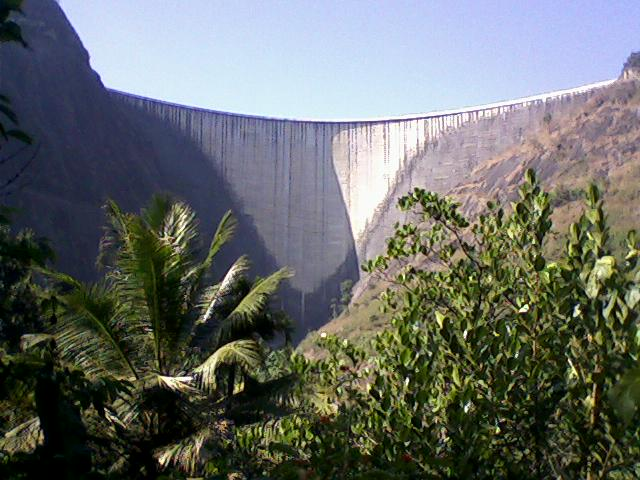
The Idukki Dam in Kerala, India

Most often, the arch dam is made of concrete and placed in a V-shaped valley. The foundation or abutments for an arch dam must be very stable and proportionate to the concrete. There are two basic designs for an arch dam: constant-radius dams, which have constant radius of curvature, and variable-radius dams, which have both upstream and downstream curves that systematically decrease in radius below the crest. A dam that is double-curved in both its horizontal and vertical planes may be called a dome dam. Arch dams with more than one contiguous arch or plane are described as multiple-arch dams. Early examples include the Roman Esparragalejo Dam with later examples such as the Daniel-Johnson Dam (1968) and Itaipu Dam (1982). However, as a result of the failure of the Gleno Dam shortly after it was constructed in 1923, the construction of new multiple arch dams has become less popular.

Contraction joints are normally placed every 20 m in the arch dam and are later filled with grout after the control cools and cures.

== Types ==
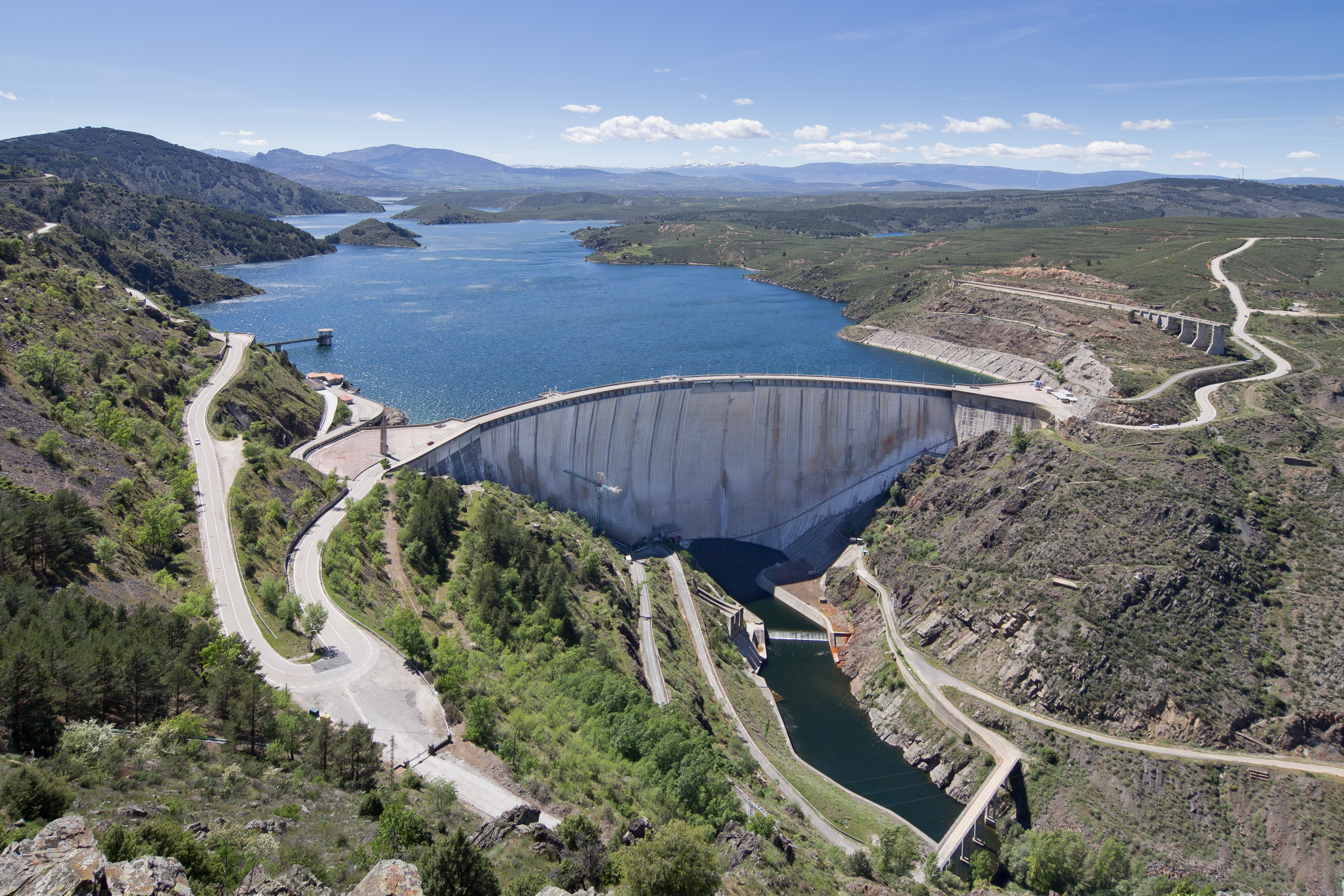
El Atazar Dam, near Madrid

=== Constant radii arch dam ===
The upstream face of the dam has a constant radius making it a linear shape face throughout the height of the dam. But the inner curves their radius reduces as we move down from top elevation to bottom and thus in cross-section it makes a shape of the triangle.

=== Variable arch dam ===
The radius of both inner and outer faces of the dam arch varies from bottom to top. The radius of the arch is greatest at the top and lowest at lower elevations. The central angle of the arch is also widened as we move upside.

=== Constant angle arch dam ===
This is the most economical in construction. However, for the third type of arch dam stronger foundation is required as it involves overhangs at the abutment sections. The constant angle arch dam is that in which the central angles of the horizontal arch rings are of the same magnitude at all elevations.

== Classification ==
In general, arch dams are classified based on the ratio of the base thickness to the structural height (b/h) as:

- Thin, for b/h less than 0.2,
- Medium-thick, for b/h between 0.2 and 0.3, and
- Thick, for b/h ratio over 0.3.

Arch dams classified with respect to their structural height are:

- Low dams up to 100 feet (30 m),
- Medium high dams between 100–300 ft (30–91 m),
- High dams over 300 ft (91 m).

== Examples of arch dams ==
- Bhumibol Dam – Dam in Sam Ngao, Tak, Thailand
- Buchanan Dam
- Contra Dam
- Daniel-Johnson Dam
- Deriner Dam
- El Atazar Dam
- Enguri Dam – Hydroelectric dam in Tsalenjikha, Georgia
- Flaming Gorge Dam – Dam on the Green River in Utah, United States
- Glen Canyon Dam – Dam in Arizona, USA
- Hartbeespoort Dam
- Hoover Dam – Dam in Nevada and Arizona, US
- Idukki Dam
- Iron Gate – Dam in Antakya, Turkey
- Kariba Dam – Dam in Zambia and Zimbabwe
- Karun-3 Dam
- Luzzone Dam – Reservoir in Ticino, Switzerland
- Mauvoisin Dam
- Mratinje Dam
- New Bullards Bar Dam – Dam in California
- Pensacola Dam – Dam in Mayes County, Oklahoma, U.S.
- St. Francis Dam – Former dam in Los Angeles County, California, US
- Victoria Dam
- Xiluodu Dam

== See also ==
- Arch-gravity dam – Type of dam
- Gravity dam – Type of dam using its weight to hold back water
- Parabolic arch – Type of arch shape
