= El Atazar Dam =

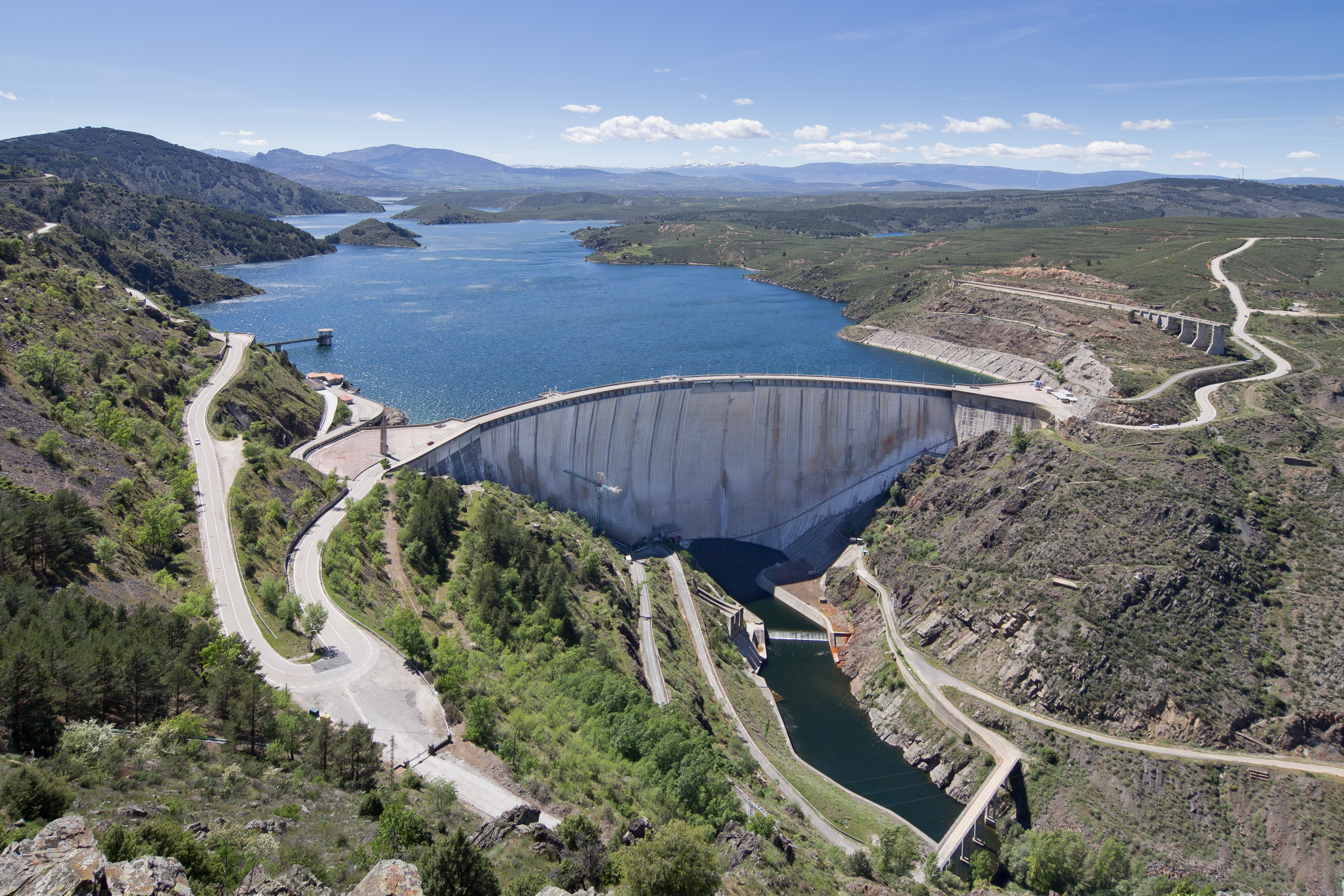
- The dam in 2014
- Interactive map of El Atazar Dam
- Country: Spain
- Location: Community of Madrid
- Coordinates: 40°54′44″N 3°28′24″W
- Status: Completed
- Construction began: 1968

Dam and spillways
- Height (foundation): 134 m (440 ft)
- Length: 52.3 m (172 ft)

Reservoir
- Creates: El Atazar Reservoir
- Total capacity: 426 hm^{3} (1.50×10^{10} cu ft)
- Surface area: 10.7 km²

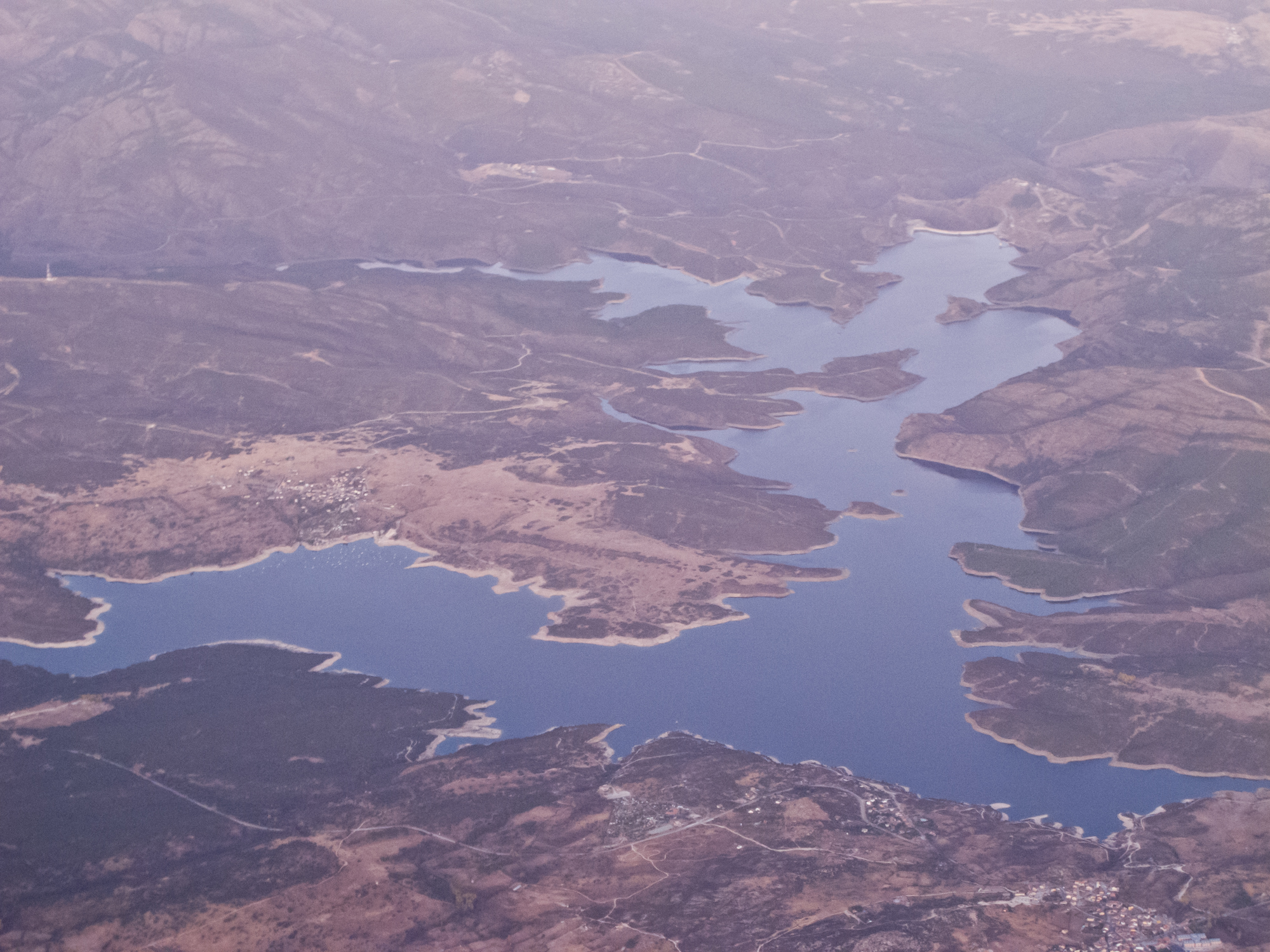
The reservoir

El Atazar Dam is an arch dam built near Madrid, Spain on the Lozoya River, very close to where the Lozoya joins the Jarama. The curved design of the dam is optimum for the narrow gorge in which it was built to retain water in the reservoir. Arch dams are thin and require less material to construct than other dam types.

When the dam was built, the decision was made to use the dam to store and regulate water only and not to provide energy. Construction started on the dam in 1968 and finished in 1972.

== Design ==
The dam is 134 m (440 ft) high and 52.3 m (171.6 ft) wide at the foundation. The reservoir capacity is 424,000,000 m^{3} (344,000 acre feet). It is a double curvature concrete arch buttress design.

== Problems ==
Monitoring of the dam revealed abnormal movement. Although dams normally move, the left side of the El Atazar Dam was moving more than the right because a support built on the dam's right made that side less flexible. In 1977 a crack was noticed in the dam. By 1979 the crack had grown to 46 m (150 ft) in length and was repaired. Inspection in 1983 revealed that the settling in the foundations and the movements of the dam had caused fracturing in the rock, resulting in significantly increasing the foundation's permeability. The crack has been treated and since then the problems have abated.

== Power plant ==
The dam supports a hydroelectric power plant with a nameplate capacity of 9,56 MW. Its annual generation lies between 18,66 (2012) and 44,49 (1998) GWh. The power station contains 2 Francis turbine-generators with 4,78 MW (5,4 MVA) each. The turbine rotation is 500 rpm. The hydraulic head is 56 m. Maximum flow per turbine is 8 m³/s.

== Gallery ==
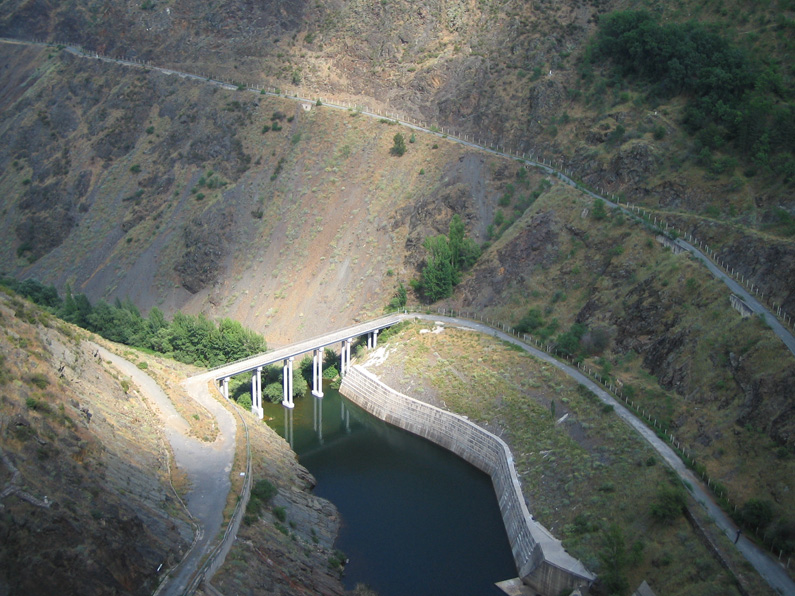

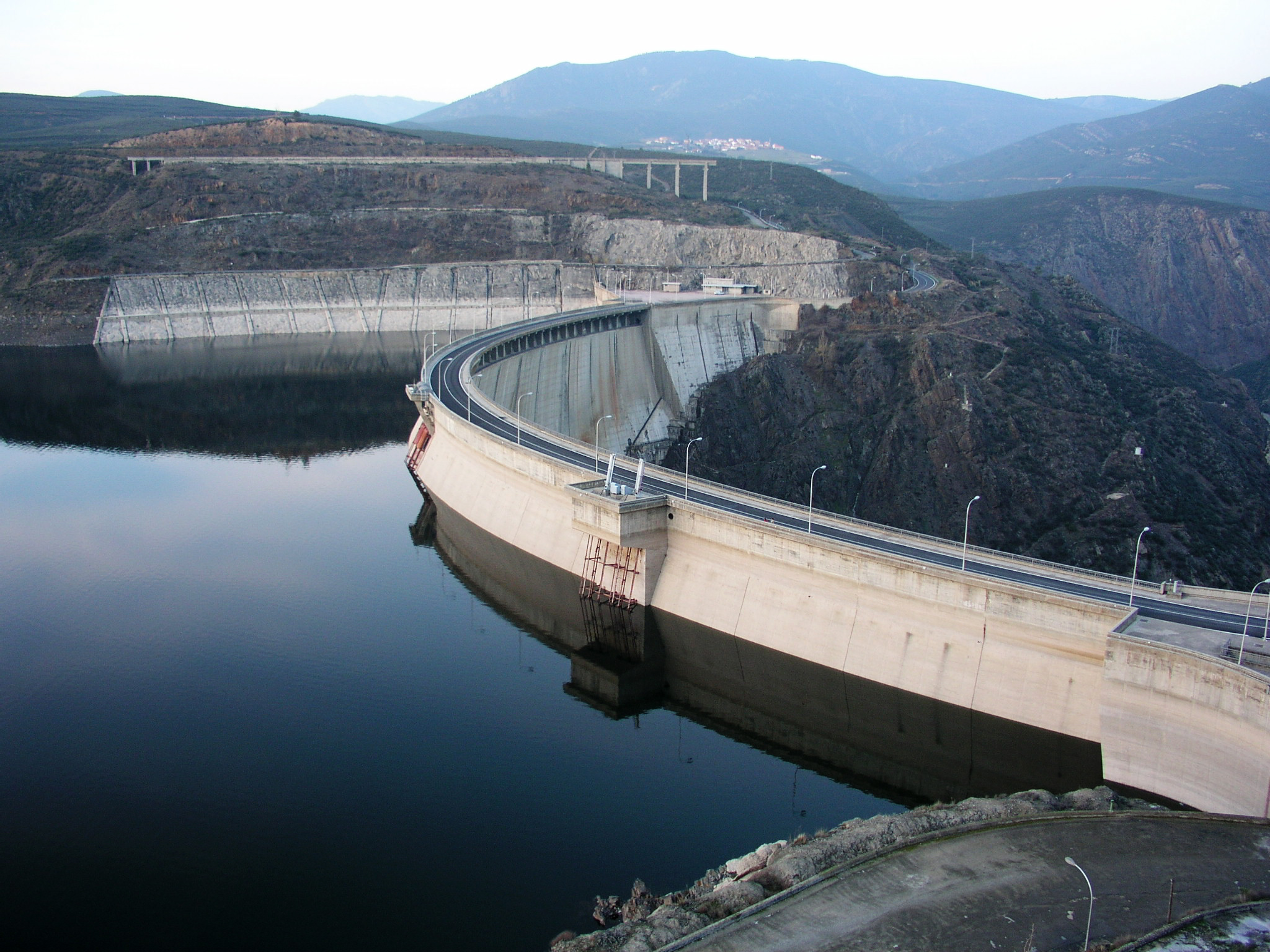

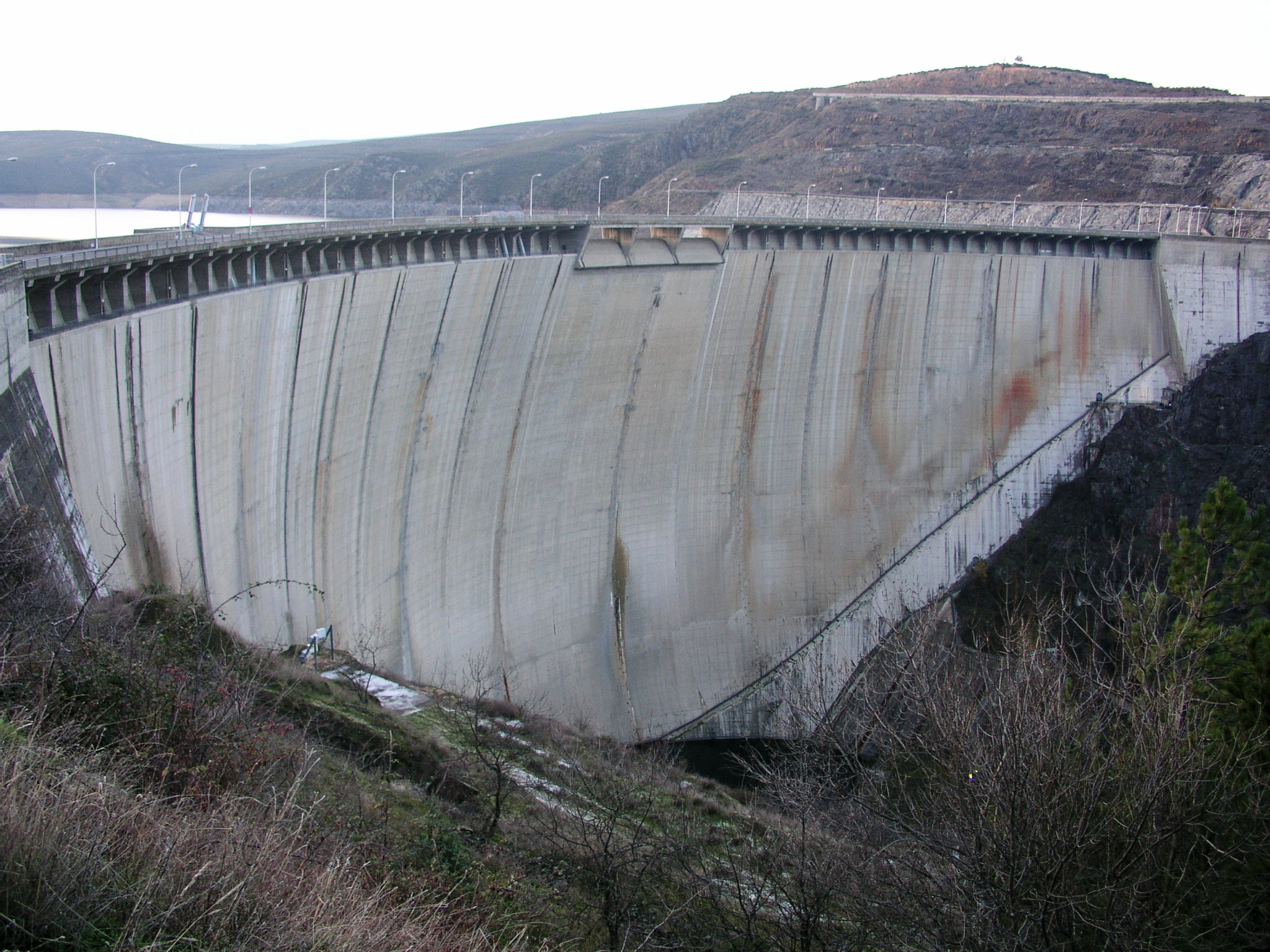

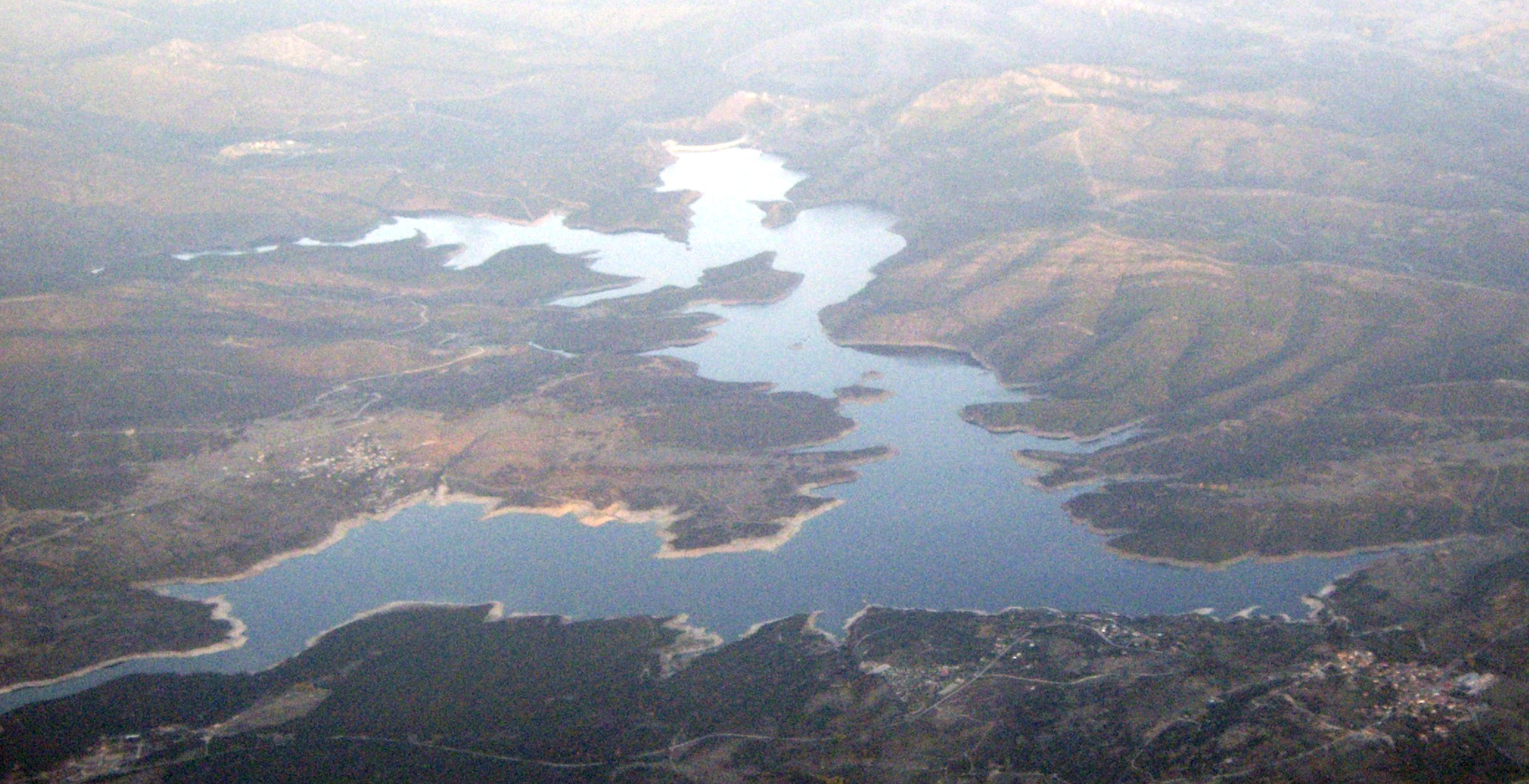
