= Kebar Dam =

Historic dam in Iran

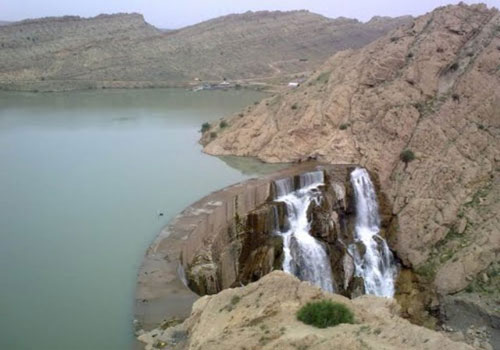

- Location within Iran
- Location: Qom, Qom province, Iran
- Coordinates: 34°28′12″N 51°00′46″E
- Status: Operational
- Construction began: ~1300 AD

Dam and spillways
- Type of dam: Arch, masonry
- Height: 26 metres (85 ft)
- Length: 55 metres (180 ft)
- Width (base): 4.5–5 metres (15–16 ft)

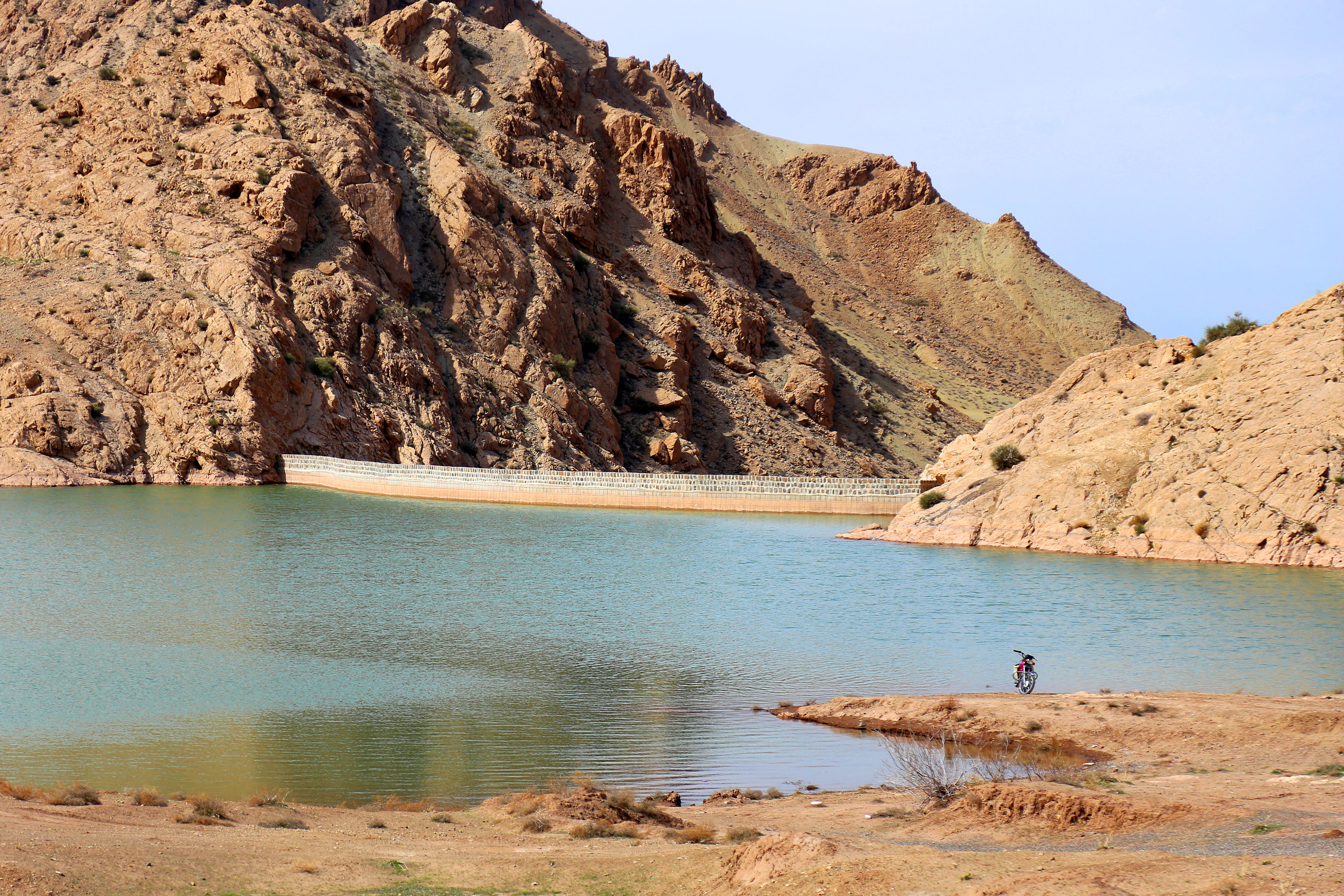
Kebar Dam, Qom, Iran

The Kebar Dam (Persian: سد کبار) is a masonry arch dam on the Kebar River, Iran, located near a town of the same name, 23 km southeast of Qom, near the village of Zanburak in Jannatabad, Qom. The dam is an early arch dam and was the first arch dam constructed by the Mongols, around 1300 AD. It is the oldest surviving arch dam.

The dam is 26m tall and 55m wide and was constructed for irrigation water supply. It was originally 24m tall but 2m of height was added in either the beginning or middle of the 17th century. The arch of the dam was of normal curvature with a radius of 35m and angle of 45-degrees. While the dam sat on limestone, its curve rested on two winged walls that served as abutments. The downstream face of the dam was vertical until near its abutment where it slightly curves out. Near the dam's right, or western, abutment there is a 10m deep cylindrical hole which served as an intake and outlet works for the dam. The outlet works is located at the bottom and is a larger opening but there are various smaller openings throughout the shaft to release water. The dam impounded a small reservoir that is no longer used and is mostly filled with silt.
