= Beni M'Tir =

Beni M'Tir بني مطير
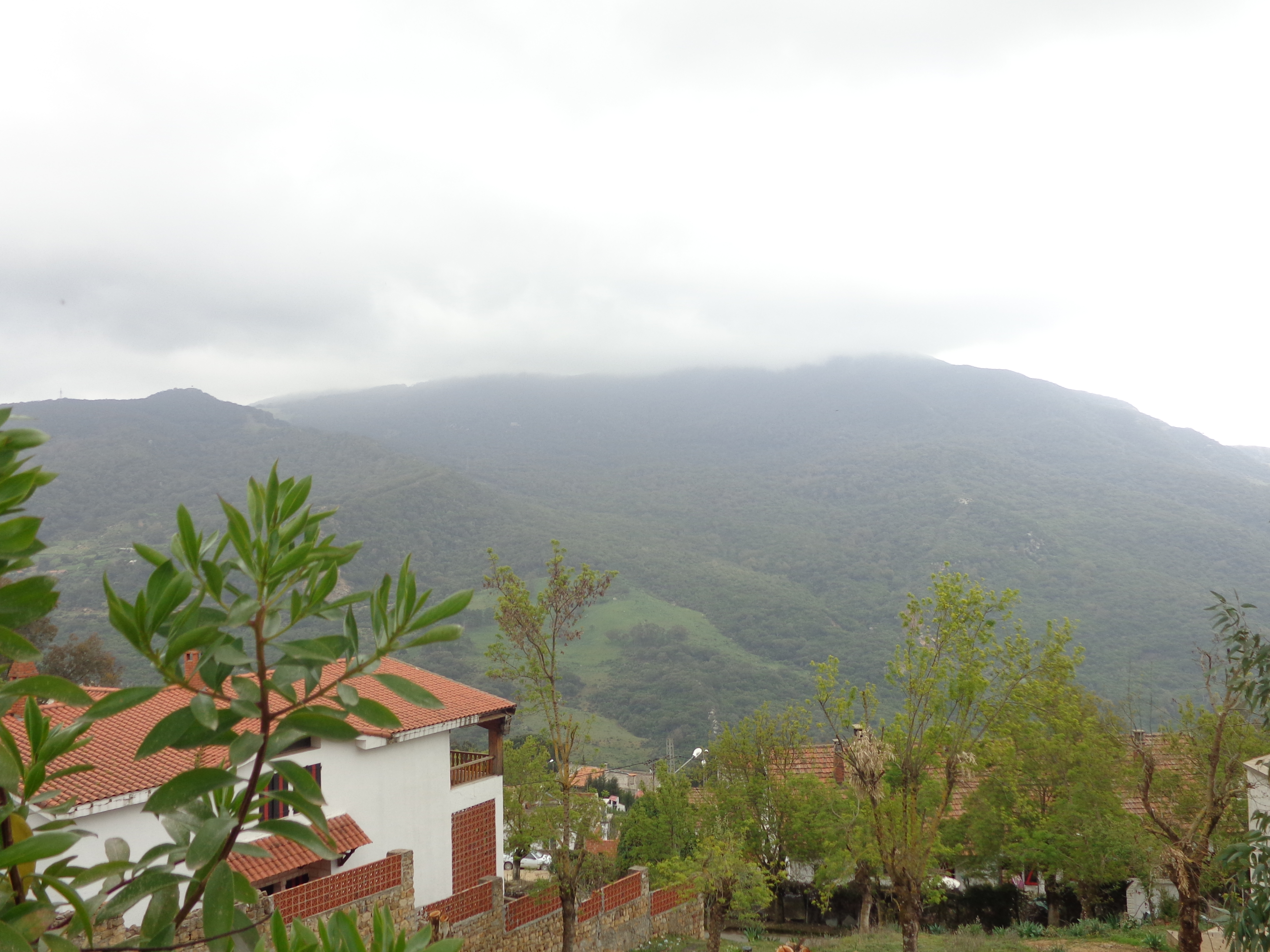

- Location in Tunisia
- Coordinates: 36°44′24″N 8°44′04″E
- Country: Tunisia
- Governorate: Jendouba Governorate
- Established: 1907

Population (2014)
  - Total: 576
- Time zone: UTC1 (CET)

Beni M'Tir is a Tunisian village in the Jendouba Governorate, a few miles away from Aïn Draham. It lies at an elevation of 650 metres and has a population of 576 as of 2014.
