= Lac de Montsalvens =

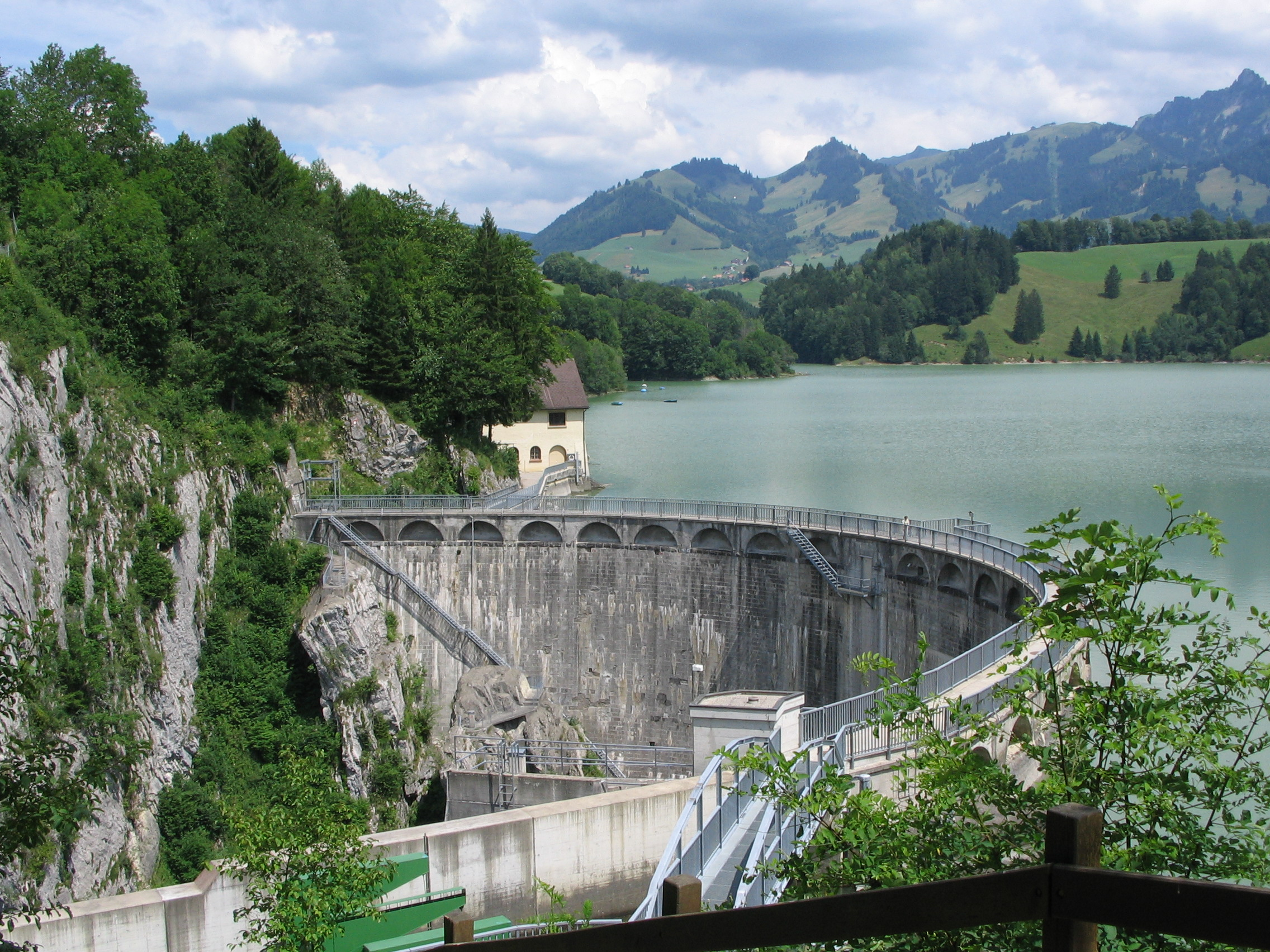

- Location within Canton of Fribourg Location within Switzerland Location within Alps
- Interactive map of Lac de Montsalvens
- Location: Canton of Fribourg
- Coordinates: 46°36′45″N 7°8′22″E
- Type: reservoir
- Primary inflows: La Jogne/Jaunbach, Le Javro, R. de Motélon
- Primary outflows: La Jogne/Jaunbach
- Catchment area: 173 km^{2} (67 sq mi)
- Basin countries: Switzerland
- Surface area: 0.74 km^{2} (0.29 sq mi)
- Max. depth: 50 m (160 ft)
- Water volume: 12.6 million cubic metres (10,200 acre⋅ft)
- Surface elevation: 801 m (2,628 ft)
- Settlements: Charmey

Lac de Montsalvens is a reservoir in the Canton of Fribourg, Switzerland. The reservoir has a capacity of 12.6 million m³ and a surface area of 0.74 km^{2} (0.29 sq mi). It was built on the Jogne river, before the gorges, and below the road to Jaun Pass, between the villages of Broc and Charmey.

The Grand Council of the canton of Fribourg decided construction of the dam on 17/18 May 1918. Designed by Alfred Stucky, the construction was completed by 1920 and in 1921 the reservoir filled for the first time.

Thanks to a forced conduct, electricity is produced at the Electrobroc power plant, located at Broc near the Cailler factory.

== See also ==
- List of lakes of Switzerland
- List of mountain lakes of Switzerland
