= List of cultural property of national significance in Switzerland: Vaud =

This list contains all cultural property of national significance (class A) in the canton of Vaud from the 2009 Swiss Inventory of Cultural Property of National and Regional Significance. It is sorted by municipality and contains 186 individual buildings, 46 collections, 32 archaeological finds and 2 other, special sites or objects.

The geographic coordinates provided are in the Swiss coordinate system as given in the Inventory.

== Agiez ==
KGS No.^{?}	Picture	Name	Street Address	CH1903 X coordinate	CH1903 Y coordinate	Location
Unknown		ISOS village: Agiez				

== Aigle ==
KGS No.^{?}	Picture	Name	Street Address	CH1903 X coordinate	CH1903 Y coordinate	Location
5889; 8694	Aigle Castle and Museum de la vigne	Aigle Castle and Museum de la vigne	Du vin and de l'étiquette, Chemin	564.381	129.400	46.315055°N 6.976214°E
5897	Swiss Reformed Church of Saint-Maurice	Swiss Reformed Church of Saint-Maurice	Avenue du cloître	564.208	129.503	46.315972°N 6.97396°E
5890		De la dîme House	Chemin du château	564.331	129.386	46.314926°N 6.975566°E
Unknown		ISOS petite City / bourg: Aigle				

== Allaman ==
KGS No.^{?}	Picture	Name	Street Address	CH1903 X coordinate	CH1903 Y coordinate	Location
5898	Allaman Castle	Allaman Castle		520.063	147.196	46.471317°N 6.397841°E

== Arnex-sur-Orbe ==
KGS No.^{?}	Picture	Name	Street Address	CH1903 X coordinate	CH1903 Y coordinate	Location
Unknown		ISOS village: Arnex-sur-Orbe				

== Arzier ==
KGS No.^{?}	Picture	Name	Street Address	CH1903 X coordinate	CH1903 Y coordinate	Location
9687	Oujon Charterhouse and House Basse	Oujon Charterhouse and House Basse	Monastère médiéval	503.480	146.670	46.464402°N 6.182071°E

== Aubonne ==
KGS No.^{?}	Picture	Name	Street Address	CH1903 X coordinate	CH1903 Y coordinate	Location
10315	Former Federal Powder Mill	Former Federal Powder Mill	Chemin de la vaux 48	520.514	148.916	46.486842°N 6.403417°E
5905	Aubonne Castle	Aubonne Castle		519.596	150.026	46.496716°N 6.39127°E
5908	City Hall and grenette	City Hall and grenette	Grande rue 2	519.580	149.890	46.495491°N 6.391085°E
5910	D'Aspre House With Orangery	D'Aspre House With Orangery	Le clos d'Aspre	519.650	149.775	46.494465°N 6.392016°E
5911	Manoir et manège	Manoir et manège	Bougy-Saint-Martin 6	518.853	149.629	46.493056°N 6.381662°E
Unknown		ISOS petite City / bourg: Aubonne				
Unknown		ISOS cas particulier: Poudrerie fédérale				

== Avenches ==
KGS No.^{?}	Picture	Name	Street Address	CH1903 X coordinate	CH1903 Y coordinate	Location
5918; 5913	Aventicum, Roman City	Aventicum, Roman City		570.400	192.400	46.882059°N 7.050307°E
5915	Avenches Castle	Avenches Castle	Rue du château	569.700	192.323	46.881334°N 7.041129°E
5920	Cure	Cure	Rue du Jura 2	569.636	192.281	46.880954°N 7.040292°E
5923	Swiss Reformed Church	Swiss Reformed Church	Place de l'église	569.664	192.201	46.880235°N 7.040665°E
6051	Temple à Donatyre	Temple à Donatyre	Route de Villarepos	570.990	191.790	46.876597°N 7.058086°E
10508	L'évêque Tower With Amphitheatre and Roman Museum	L'évêque Tower With Amphitheatre and Roman Museum		569.860	192.300	46.881135°N 7.043229°E
Unknown		ISOS petite City / bourg: Avenches				
Unknown		ISOS cas particulier: Haras fédéral				

== Baulmes ==
KGS No.^{?}	Picture	Name	Street Address	CH1903 X coordinate	CH1903 Y coordinate	Location
5927		Abri de la Cure; Prehistoric Shelter		529.700	182.800	46.792652°N 6.517865°E
11687	Beffroi communal	Beffroi communal	Place de la tour	529.965	182.585	46.790746°N 6.521369°E
Unknown		ISOS village: Baulmes				

== Begnins ==
KGS No.^{?}	Picture	Name	Street Address	CH1903 X coordinate	CH1903 Y coordinate	Location
Unknown		ISOS village: Begnins				

== Bex ==
KGS No.^{?}	Picture	Name	Street Address	CH1903 X coordinate	CH1903 Y coordinate	Location
5946	Church Bell Tower	Church Bell Tower		567.125	122.290	46.251237°N 7.012338°E
5945	Salt Mining Complex	Salt Mining Complex	Route de Gryon 29	568.457	123.312	46.260494°N 7.029541°E
5948	Fortifications de l'Arzillier	Fortifications de l'Arzillier		566.720	119.440	46.22558°N 7.00729°E
10498	Bridge Over the Rhone Shared With St-Maurice in Valais.	Bridge Over the Rhone; Shared With St-Maurice in Valais.	Route de Saint-Maurice / Route du Chablais	566.421	119.207	46.223469°N 7.003431°E
Unknown		ISOS village: Les Posses				
Unknown		ISOS cas particulier: Le Bévieux				

== Blonay ==
KGS No.^{?}	Picture	Name	Street Address	CH1903 X coordinate	CH1903 Y coordinate	Location
5956	Blonay Castle	Blonay Castle	Chemin du château	557.849	146.616	46.469542°N 6.889852°E

== Bofflens ==
KGS No.^{?}	Picture	Name	Street Address	CH1903 X coordinate	CH1903 Y coordinate	Location
Unknown		ISOS village: Bofflens				

== Bonvillars ==
KGS No.^{?}	Picture	Name	Street Address	CH1903 X coordinate	CH1903 Y coordinate	Location
Unknown		ISOS village: Bonvillars				

== Bougy-Villars ==
KGS No.^{?}	Picture	Name	Street Address	CH1903 X coordinate	CH1903 Y coordinate	Location
Unknown		ISOS village: Bougy-Villars				

== Bourg-en-Lavaux ==
KGS No.^{?}	Picture	Name	Street Address	CH1903 X coordinate	CH1903 Y coordinate	Location
6106	Maison Maillardoz	Maison Maillardoz	Rue Saint-Georges 11	544.618	149.426	46.493855°N 6.717263°E
Unknown		UNESCO World Heritage Site: Lavaux, Vineyard Terraces				
Unknown		ISOS village: Grandvaux				
Unknown		ISOS village: Riex				
Unknown		ISOS village: Aran				
Unknown		ISOS petite City / bourg: Cully				
Unknown		ISOS village: Epesses				

== Bursinel ==
KGS No.^{?}	Picture	Name	Street Address	CH1903 X coordinate	CH1903 Y coordinate	Location
5964		Villa Choisy and Outbuildings	Choisy	513.759	143.783	46.439836°N 6.316408°E

== Bursins ==
KGS No.^{?}	Picture	Name	Street Address	CH1903 X coordinate	CH1903 Y coordinate	Location
5968	Swiss Reformed Church of Saint-Martin, Formerly Site of a Priory	Swiss Reformed Church of Saint-Martin, Formerly Site of a Priory	Rue de l'église	511.734	145.292	46.453146°N 6.289774°E
11665		Tuilerie de Vinzel avec four Hoffmann	En Beroche	511.275	144.683	46.447607°N 6.283917°E
Unknown		ISOS village: Bursins				

== Burtigny ==
KGS No.^{?}	Picture	Name	Street Address	CH1903 X coordinate	CH1903 Y coordinate	Location
Unknown		ISOS village: Burtigny				

== Champagne ==
KGS No.^{?}	Picture	Name	Street Address	CH1903 X coordinate	CH1903 Y coordinate	Location
Unknown		ISOS village: Champagne				

== Champvent ==
KGS No.^{?}	Picture	Name	Street Address	CH1903 X coordinate	CH1903 Y coordinate	Location
5970	Champvent Castle	Champvent Castle	Chemin du château	533.758	181.231	46.778955°N 6.571238°E
5971	Manoir de Saint-Christophe	Manoir de Saint-Christophe	Saint-Christophe	532.061	180.580	46.772929°N 6.549116°E
Unknown		ISOS cas particulier: Champvent				
Unknown		ISOS cas particulier: Saint-Christophe				

== Chardonne ==
KGS No.^{?}	Picture	Name	Street Address	CH1903 X coordinate	CH1903 Y coordinate	Location
Unknown		UNESCO World Heritage Site: Lavaux, Vineyard Terraces				

== Château-d'Œx ==
KGS No.^{?}	Picture	Name	Street Address	CH1903 X coordinate	CH1903 Y coordinate	Location
Unknown		Les Ciernes-Picat; Mesolithic Shelter				
Unknown		ISOS hameau: l’Etivaz				

== Chavannes-le-Chêne ==
KGS No.^{?}	Picture	Name	Street Address	CH1903 X coordinate	CH1903 Y coordinate	Location
10509		Vallon des Vaux, Prehistoric and High Medieval Settlement		548.700	180.650	46.775047°N 6.766949°E

== Chavannes-le-Veyron ==
KGS No.^{?}	Picture	Name	Street Address	CH1903 X coordinate	CH1903 Y coordinate	Location
10319	Scierie	Scierie	Veyron les Charbonnières 49, 31	524.280	161.843	46.603555°N 6.450339°E

== Chavannes-près-Renens ==
KGS No.^{?}	Picture	Name	Street Address	CH1903 X coordinate	CH1903 Y coordinate	Location
8792	Cantonal Archives of Vaud	Cantonal Archives of Vaud	Rue de la Mouline 32	533.980	153.071	46.525679°N 6.578188°E

== Chavannes-sur-Moudon ==
KGS No.^{?}	Picture	Name	Street Address	CH1903 X coordinate	CH1903 Y coordinate	Location
Unknown		ISOS village: Chavannes-sur-Moudon				

== Chavornay ==
KGS No.^{?}	Picture	Name	Street Address	CH1903 X coordinate	CH1903 Y coordinate	Location
5984	Swiss Reformed Church of Saint-Maurice	Swiss Reformed Church of Saint-Maurice	En Couvalau	533.596	172.628	46.701556°N 6.570364°E

== Chêne-Pâquier ==
KGS No.^{?}	Picture	Name	Street Address	CH1903 X coordinate	CH1903 Y coordinate	Location
5985	Temple et cure	Temple et cure	Le Pâquier	548.460	180.140	46.770441°N 6.763864°E
Unknown		ISOS cas particulier: Chêne-Pâquier				

== Cheseaux-Noréaz ==
KGS No.^{?}	Picture	Name	Street Address	CH1903 X coordinate	CH1903 Y coordinate	Location
5990	Campagne de Champittet	Campagne de Champittet	Château de Champittet	540.989	181.670	46.783584°N 6.665861°E

== Chéserex ==
KGS No.^{?}	Picture	Name	Street Address	CH1903 X coordinate	CH1903 Y coordinate	Location
5993	Church of the Old Bonmont Abbey	Church of the Old Bonmont Abbey	Bonmont	500.839	139.872	46.402873°N 6.149149°E

== Chexbres ==
KGS No.^{?}	Picture	Name	Street Address	CH1903 X coordinate	CH1903 Y coordinate	Location
Unknown		UNESCO World Heritage Site: Lavaux, Vineyard Terraces				

== Concise ==
KGS No.^{?}	Picture	Name	Street Address	CH1903 X coordinate	CH1903 Y coordinate	Location
6005		Ancienne chartreuse de la Lance	La Lance	546.514	189.998	46.858961°N 6.737235°E
6006	La Raisse / En Favarges Roman Quarry	La Raisse / En Favarges; Roman Quarry		547.100	190.250	46.861274°N 6.74489°E
9690	Sous-Colachoz Bay and Lakeshore Neolithic and Bronze Age Settlements	Sous-Colachoz; Bay and Lakeshore Neolithic and Bronze Age Settlements		545.000	188.700	46.847162°N 6.717538°E
Unknown		ISOS village: Concise				
Unknown		ISOS cas particulier: La Lance				

== Coppet ==
KGS No.^{?}	Picture	Name	Street Address	CH1903 X coordinate	CH1903 Y coordinate	Location
6010; 9174	Coppet Castle and Institut européen de l'université de Genève, centre d'archives européennes	Coppet Castle and Institut européen de l'université de Genève, centre d'archives européennes	Rue de la gare 2	503.985	130.290	46.317145°N 6.192032°E
6013	Temple (Former Church of the Dominicans)	Temple (Former Church of the Dominicans)	Grand-Rue	504.064	130.141	46.315816°N 6.193088°E
Unknown		ISOS petite City / bourg: Coppet				

== Corcelles-près-Concise ==
KGS No.^{?}	Picture	Name	Street Address	CH1903 X coordinate	CH1903 Y coordinate	Location
Unknown		ISOS village: Corcelles-près-Concise				

== Corseaux ==
KGS No.^{?}	Picture	Name	Street Address	CH1903 X coordinate	CH1903 Y coordinate	Location
6020	Villa le Lac	Villa le Lac	Route de Lavaux 21	553.210	146.525	46.468415°N 6.829466°E
Unknown		UNESCO World Heritage Site: Lavaux, Vineyard Terraces				

== Corsier-sur-Vevey ==
KGS No.^{?}	Picture	Name	Street Address	CH1903 X coordinate	CH1903 Y coordinate	Location
6021	Café de la place	Café de la place	Place du temple 5	554.141	146.754	46.47054°N 6.841564°E
6022		Manoir de Ban: House de maître With Outbuildings and Park	Route de Fénil 2	554.903	147.293	46.47544°N 6.851432°E
Unknown		UNESCO World Heritage Site: Lavaux, Vineyard Terraces				

== Cossonay ==
KGS No.^{?}	Picture	Name	Street Address	CH1903 X coordinate	CH1903 Y coordinate	Location
6029	Swiss Reformed Church of St Peter and St Paul	Swiss Reformed Church of St Peter and St Paul	Place du temple	528.800	162.970	46.614189°N 6.509155°E
Unknown		ISOS petite City / bourg: Cossonay				
Unknown		ISOS village: La Chaux				

== Crans-près-Céligny ==
KGS No.^{?}	Picture	Name	Street Address	CH1903 X coordinate	CH1903 Y coordinate	Location
6031	Crans Castle	Crans Castle	Château de Crans	505.352	134.784	46.357761°N 6.208863°E

== Cronay ==
KGS No.^{?}	Picture	Name	Street Address	CH1903 X coordinate	CH1903 Y coordinate	Location
Unknown		ISOS village: Cronay				

== Cuarnens ==
KGS No.^{?}	Picture	Name	Street Address	CH1903 X coordinate	CH1903 Y coordinate	Location
Unknown		ISOS village: Cuarnens				

== Cudrefin ==
KGS No.^{?}	Picture	Name	Street Address	CH1903 X coordinate	CH1903 Y coordinate	Location
6034	Fountain of Justice	Fountain of Justice	Place de la justice	568.022	200.547	46.955232°N 7.018538°E
Unknown		ISOS village: Montet				

== Curtilles ==
KGS No.^{?}	Picture	Name	Street Address	CH1903 X coordinate	CH1903 Y coordinate	Location
6045	Curtilles Castle	Curtilles Castle	Au village	554.844	172.069	46.698304°N 6.848237°E

== Daillens ==
KGS No.^{?}	Picture	Name	Street Address	CH1903 X coordinate	CH1903 Y coordinate	Location
6047	Clocher du temple	Clocher du temple	Au village	531.840	163.640	46.620532°N 6.548738°E

== Démoret ==
KGS No.^{?}	Picture	Name	Street Address	CH1903 X coordinate	CH1903 Y coordinate	Location
Unknown		ISOS village: Démoret				

== Donneloye ==
KGS No.^{?}	Picture	Name	Street Address	CH1903 X coordinate	CH1903 Y coordinate	Location
Unknown		ISOS village: Prahins				

== Duillier ==
KGS No.^{?}	Picture	Name	Street Address	CH1903 X coordinate	CH1903 Y coordinate	Location
6053	Duillier Castle	Duillier Castle	Rue du château	507.389	140.207	46.406822°N 6.234244°E
6054	Grange des dîmes	Grange des dîmes	Verchère	507.280	140.380	46.408363°N 6.232792°E

== Dully ==
KGS No.^{?}	Picture	Name	Street Address	CH1903 X coordinate	CH1903 Y coordinate	Location
6055		Dully Castle and Outbuildings	Rue du village	512.095	142.652	46.429447°N 6.294973°E

== Echichens ==
KGS No.^{?}	Picture	Name	Street Address	CH1903 X coordinate	CH1903 Y coordinate	Location
6492	Mestral Castle	Mestral Castle	Saint-Saphorin-sur-Morges, Le Pavé	527.054	155.339	46.54536°N 6.487571°E
Unknown		ISOS village: Saint-Saphorin-sur-Morges				
Unknown		ISOS village: Colombier				

== Eclépens ==
KGS No.^{?}	Picture	Name	Street Address	CH1903 X coordinate	CH1903 Y coordinate	Location
6063	Abandoned D'Entreroches Canal	Abandoned D'Entreroches Canal		532.260	168.194	46.661538°N 6.55355°E
11776	Le Mormont Proto-Historic Through Iron Age Site	Le Mormont; Proto-Historic Through Iron Age Site		530.730	167.500	46.655139°N 6.533666°E
Unknown		ISOS village: Eclépens				

== Écublens ==
KGS No.^{?}	Picture	Name	Street Address	CH1903 X coordinate	CH1903 Y coordinate	Location
10596	Archives of Modern Construction, EPFL, SG-Ecublens	Archives of Modern Construction, EPFL, SG-Ecublens		532.880	152.557	46.520946°N 6.563928°E
8933; 9348	Cantonal and University Library of Lausanne and University of Lausanne, Manuscripts Department	Cantonal and University Library of Lausanne and University of Lausanne, Manuscripts Department	Allée de Dorigny	534.078	152.738	46.522693°N 6.579513°E
9159	Jean Monnet Foundation for Europe	Jean Monnet Foundation for Europe	Route de la Sorge	534.299	152.880	46.523992°N 6.582373°E

== Essertines-sur-Rolle ==
KGS No.^{?}	Picture	Name	Street Address	CH1903 X coordinate	CH1903 Y coordinate	Location
Unknown		ISOS hameau: Bugnaux				

== Essertines-sur-Yverdon ==
KGS No.^{?}	Picture	Name	Street Address	CH1903 X coordinate	CH1903 Y coordinate	Location
Unknown		ISOS village: Essertines-sur-Yverdon				

== Etoy ==
KGS No.^{?}	Picture	Name	Street Address	CH1903 X coordinate	CH1903 Y coordinate	Location
Unknown		ISOS village: Etoy				

== Faoug ==
KGS No.^{?}	Picture	Name	Street Address	CH1903 X coordinate	CH1903 Y coordinate	Location
10322	Domaine Cornaz et ses dépendances	Domaine Cornaz et ses dépendances	Route de Salavaux	572.340	195.278	46.90803°N 7.075583°E

== Féchy ==
KGS No.^{?}	Picture	Name	Street Address	CH1903 X coordinate	CH1903 Y coordinate	Location
6072		La Gordanne, Main House and Outbuildings	Route suisse 6	518.485	146.761	46.467214°N 6.377374°E
Unknown		ISOS village: Féchy				

== Ferreyres ==
KGS No.^{?}	Picture	Name	Street Address	CH1903 X coordinate	CH1903 Y coordinate	Location
Unknown		ISOS village: Ferreyres				

== Fiez ==
KGS No.^{?}	Picture	Name	Street Address	CH1903 X coordinate	CH1903 Y coordinate	Location
Unknown		ISOS village: Fiez				

== Fontaines-sur-Grandson ==
KGS No.^{?}	Picture	Name	Street Address	CH1903 X coordinate	CH1903 Y coordinate	Location
Unknown		ISOS village: Fontaines-sur-Grandson				

== Giez ==
KGS No.^{?}	Picture	Name	Street Address	CH1903 X coordinate	CH1903 Y coordinate	Location
Unknown		ISOS cas particulier: Giez				

== Gilly ==
KGS No.^{?}	Picture	Name	Street Address	CH1903 X coordinate	CH1903 Y coordinate	Location
6082		Campagne de Beaulieu	Route de Genève 68	513.805	144.670	46.44782°N 6.316842°E
6081	Vincy Castle	Vincy Castle	Vincy 2	512.611	146.269	46.462048°N 6.301003°E
10323	Farm House ECA 148	Farm House ECA 148	La rue 14	512.281	145.898	46.458668°N 6.296778°E

== Gimel ==
KGS No.^{?}	Picture	Name	Street Address	CH1903 X coordinate	CH1903 Y coordinate	Location
Unknown		ISOS village: Gimel				

== Givrins ==
KGS No.^{?}	Picture	Name	Street Address	CH1903 X coordinate	CH1903 Y coordinate	Location
Unknown		ISOS village: Givrins				

== Gland ==
KGS No.^{?}	Picture	Name	Street Address	CH1903 X coordinate	CH1903 Y coordinate	Location
10325	La Rajada Villa, Outbuildings, and Lands	La Rajada; Villa, Outbuildings, and Lands		511.644	141.119	46.415599°N 6.289398°E

== Grandcour ==
KGS No.^{?}	Picture	Name	Street Address	CH1903 X coordinate	CH1903 Y coordinate	Location
6093	Grandcour Castle	Grandcour Castle	Au village	561.223	191.519	46.873662°N 6.929989°E
6092	Swiss Reformed Church of Notre-Dame de Ressudens	Swiss Reformed Church of Notre-Dame de Ressudens	Ressudens	562.580	191.220	46.87105°N 6.947813°E
Unknown		ISOS village: Grandcour				

== Grandson ==
KGS No.^{?}	Picture	Name	Street Address	CH1903 X coordinate	CH1903 Y coordinate	Location
6094	Grandson Castle	Grandson Castle	Place du château 14	539.582	184.584	46.809669°N 6.647052°E
6095	Swiss Reformed Church of Saint-Jean-Baptiste	Swiss Reformed Church of Saint-Jean-Baptiste	Rue haute	539.324	184.447	46.808413°N 6.64369°E
Unknown		ISOS petite City / bourg: Grandson				

== Gressy ==
KGS No.^{?}	Picture	Name	Street Address	CH1903 X coordinate	CH1903 Y coordinate	Location
10991	Oppidum de Sermuz, Iron Age Settlement	Oppidum de Sermuz, Iron Age Settlement		539.400	178.700	46.756726°N 6.645447°E

== Gryon ==
KGS No.^{?}	Picture	Name	Street Address	CH1903 X coordinate	CH1903 Y coordinate	Location
Unknown		ISOS village urbanisé: Gryon				
Unknown		ISOS cas particulier: Taveyanne				

== Hautemorges ==
KGS No.^{?}	Picture	Name	Street Address	CH1903 X coordinate	CH1903 Y coordinate	Location
Unknown		ISOS village: Pampigny				

== Jongny ==
KGS No.^{?}	Picture	Name	Street Address	CH1903 X coordinate	CH1903 Y coordinate	Location
Unknown		UNESCO World Heritage Site: Lavaux, Vineyard Terraces				

== Jorat-Mézières ==
KGS No.^{?}	Picture	Name	Street Address	CH1903 X coordinate	CH1903 Y coordinate	Location
6234	Théâtre du Jorat	Théâtre du Jorat	Rue du théâtre, Mézières	548.892	160.965	46.597992°N 6.771653°E

== Jouxtens-Mézery ==
KGS No.^{?}	Picture	Name	Street Address	CH1903 X coordinate	CH1903 Y coordinate	Location
Unknown		ISOS cas particulier: Jouxtens-Mézery				

== L'Abbaye ==
KGS No.^{?}	Picture	Name	Street Address	CH1903 X coordinate	CH1903 Y coordinate	Location
5885	Manoir de haute roche	Manoir de haute roche	Le pont	515.338	169.127	46.667999°N 6.332303°E
Unknown		ISOS village: Le Pont				

== La Sarraz ==
KGS No.^{?}	Picture	Name	Street Address	CH1903 X coordinate	CH1903 Y coordinate	Location
6466	Chapelle Saint-Antoine	Chapelle Saint-Antoine	Dite du Jacquemart, Grand-Rue	529.280	168.014	46.65961°N 6.514645°E
6467	La Sarraz Castle	La Sarraz Castle	Rue du château	529.241	168.102	46.660397°N 6.514122°E
Unknown		ISOS petite City / bourg: La Sarraz				

== La Tour-de-Peilz ==
KGS No.^{?}	Picture	Name	Street Address	CH1903 X coordinate	CH1903 Y coordinate	Location
6502	Villa Kenwin	Villa Kenwin	Chemin du Vallon 19	556.936	144.117	46.447004°N 6.878198°E

== Lausanne ==
KGS No.^{?}	Picture	Name	Street Address	CH1903 X coordinate	CH1903 Y coordinate	Location
6116	Former Hospital	Former Hospital	Rue Mercerie 24	538.375	152.555	46.521456°N 6.635534°E
6117	Former Federal Supreme Court of Switzerland (Montbenon)	Former Federal Supreme Court of Switzerland (Montbenon)	Allée Ernest-Ansermet 2	537.707	152.463	46.520567°N 6.626841°E
6118; 8714	Former Residence of the Bishop of Lausanne and the Historical Museum of Lausanne	Former Residence of the Bishop of Lausanne and the Historical Museum of Lausanne	Place de la cathédrale 4	538.331	152.642	46.522235°N 6.634949°E
6119	Former Academy	Former Academy	Rue Cité-Devant 7	538.334	152.804	46.523692°N 6.634966°E
11779	Archives of the Banque Vaudoise	Archives of the Banque Vaudoise	Place Saint-François	538.300	152.280	46.518975°N 6.634593°E
8777	Archives of the City of Lausanne	Archives of the City of Lausanne	Rue du Maupas 47	537.528	152.973	46.525137°N 6.62444°E
11837	Archives of l'Energie Ouest Suisse (EOS)	Archives of l'Energie Ouest Suisse (EOS)	Chemin de Mornex 10	537.840	152.260	46.518753°N 6.628602°E
11781	Bibliothèque des cèdres (formerly Bibliothèque des pasteurs)	Bibliothèque des cèdres (formerly Bibliothèque des pasteurs)	Chemin des cèdres 7	537.730	153.011	46.525498°N 6.627067°E
6122	Casino de Montbenon	Casino de Montbenon	Allée Ernest-Ansermet 3	537.569	152.444	46.520383°N 6.625046°E
6123	Notre-Dame Cathedral	Notre-Dame Cathedral	Place de la cathédrale	538.370	152.680	46.52258°N 6.635452°E
8977	University Hospital of Lausanne (CHUV)	University Hospital of Lausanne (CHUV)	Rue du Bugnon 46	538.922	152.927	46.524852°N 6.642613°E
6124	Château Saint-Maire	Château Saint-Maire	Place du château 4	538.375	152.926	46.524793°N 6.635484°E
6150; 8697	Beaulieu Castle and collection de l'art brut (Collection of Outsider art)	Beaulieu Castle and collection de l'art brut (Collection of Outsider art)	Avenue des bergières 11	537.570	153.200	46.527183°N 6.624956°E
10327	Bois-de-Vaux Cemetery	Bois-de-Vaux Cemetery	Route de Chavannes 2	535.835	152.222	46.518222°N 6.602481°E
9694	Roman era / Medieval Hill Top City	Roman era / Medieval Hill Top City		537.700	152.880	46.524317°N 6.626694°E
6136	Swiss Reformed Church of Saint-François	Swiss Reformed Church of Saint-François	Place Saint-François 18	538.220	152.360	46.519688°N 6.63354°E
6203	Swiss Reformed Church of Saint-Laurent	Swiss Reformed Church of Saint-Laurent	Rue Haldimand	538.020	152.650	46.522278°N 6.630895°E
6173; 8698	Fondation de l’Hermitage, House de maître	Fondation de l’Hermitage, House de maître	Route du signal 2	538.513	153.302	46.528188°N 6.637233°E
8667	Fondation Toms Pauli Collection des tapisseries et d'art textile	Fondation Toms Pauli; Collection des tapisseries et d'art textile	Rue Caroline 2	538.502	152.424	46.520289°N 6.637206°E
6164	Galeries Saint-François	Galeries Saint-François		538.323	152.358	46.519679°N 6.634882°E
6126	Main Train Station	Main Train Station	Place de la gare	537.882	152.067	46.517021°N 6.629175°E
6190	Hôtel Beau-Rivage Palace	Hôtel Beau-Rivage Palace	Chemin de beau-rivage	537.950	151.050	46.507879°N 6.630197°E
6127	City Hall	City Hall	Place de la palud 2	538.172	152.588	46.521734°N 6.632884°E
6198	Hôtel des postes	Hôtel des postes	Place Saint-François 15	538.172	152.322	46.519341°N 6.632919°E
10510	Administration Building of André & Cie. S.A.,	Administration Building of André & Cie. S.A.,	Chemin Messidor 5, 7	538.798	151.828	46.514955°N 6.641142°E
10331	Administration Building of the Vaudoise Assurances	Administration Building of the Vaudoise Assurances	Avenue de cour 41	537.146	151.760	46.514191°N 6.619626°E
6169	Apartment and Office Building	Apartment and Office Building	Rue du Grand-Chêne 8	538.020	152.376	46.519813°N 6.630932°E
9032	Les bains de Bellerive	Les bains de Bellerive	Avenue de Rhodanie 23	536.925	151.489	46.511732°N 6.616784°E
11682	L'Estérel House	L'Estérel House	Avenue d'Ouchy 16–18	537.953	151.639	46.513178°N 6.630157°E
6177; 8711	Musée de l'Élysée et maison de l'Élysée	Musée de l'Élysée et maison de l'Élysée	Avenue de l'Élysée 18	538.158	151.275	46.509922°N 6.632877°E
11782	House	House	Chemin de Chandolin 4	539.197	152.124	46.517654°N 6.646302°E
6128	Mon-Repos, park, Home, Fountain, Stables, Orangery, and Temple of Love	Mon-Repos, park, Home, Fountain, Stables, Orangery, and Temple of Love	Parc de Mon-Repos 1	538.927	152.269	46.518934°N 6.642765°E
8701	Museum of Contemporary Design and Applied Arts (MUDAC)	Museum of Contemporary Design and Applied Arts (MUDAC)	Place de la cathédrale 6	538.360	152.630	46.522129°N 6.635328°E
8712	Cantonal Museum and Botanical Gardens	Cantonal Museum and Botanical Gardens	Avenue de cour 14	537.456	151.607	46.512843°N 6.623686°E
10674; 11614	Olympic Museum and Archives of the CIO	Olympic Museum and Archives of the CIO	Quai d'Ouchy 1	538.278	151.057	46.507972°N 6.63447°E
11616	Roman Museum	Roman Museum	Chemin du Bois-de-Vaux 24	535.553	152.302	46.518915°N 6.598795°E
6131	Ouchy, Vessels of the CGN: La Suisse (1910), Savoie (1914), Simplon (1920), Rhône (1927)	Ouchy, Vessels of the CGN: La Suisse (1910), Savoie (1914), Simplon (1920), Rhône (1927)		537.000	151.150	46.50869°N 6.617807°E
6132; 8715; 8699; 8700; 8713; 8837	Palais de Rumine et musée cantonal de géologie, Cantonal Museum of Zoology, Cantonal Museum of Fine Arts, Musée monétaire cantonal (Cabinet des médailles) et Musée d'archéologie et d'histoire	Palais de Rumine et musée cantonal de géologie, Cantonal Museum of Zoology, Cantonal Museum of Fine Arts, Musée monétaire cantonal (Cabinet des médailles) et Musée d'archéologie et d'histoire	Place de la Riponne 6	538.223	152.801	46.523655°N 6.63352°E
6197	Pont Chauderon	Pont Chauderon		537.475	152.650	46.522227°N 6.623793°E
8947	Radio Suisse Romande Archives	Radio Suisse Romande; Archives	Avenue du Temple 40	539.422	153.852	46.533218°N 6.649007°E
6206	Rural et site de Vernand-Dessus	Rural et site de Vernand-Dessus	Avenue de Vernand-Dessus 2	536.891	158.334	46.5733°N 6.615405°E
9485	Site de l'Expo 64 avec théatre de Vidy	Site de l'Expo 64 avec théatre de Vidy	Avenue Emile-H.-Jaques-Dalcroze 5	536.491	151.608	46.512762°N 6.611113°E
6202	Synagogue	Synagogue	Avenue de Florimont	538.540	151.975	46.516254°N 6.637761°E
6204	Tour Bel-Air	Tour Bel-Air	Place Bel-Air 1	537.871	152.639	46.522165°N 6.628955°E
6137; 8837	Tribunal fédéral suisse and Archives	Tribunal fédéral suisse and Archives	Avenue du tribunal fédéral 29	539.041	152.341	46.519592°N 6.644241°E
6138	Vidy / Lousanna prehistoric settlement, Roman era Vicus	Vidy / Lousanna prehistoric settlement, Roman era Vicus		535.700	152.000	46.516212°N 6.600753°E
Unknown		ISOS ville: Lausanne				
Unknown		ISOS cas particulier: Vernand-Dessus				

== Lavigny ==
KGS No.^{?}	Picture	Name	Street Address	CH1903 X coordinate	CH1903 Y coordinate	Location
Unknown		ISOS village: Lavigny				

== Le Chenit ==
KGS No.^{?}	Picture	Name	Street Address	CH1903 X coordinate	CH1903 Y coordinate	Location
Unknown		ISOS village urbanisé: Le Sentier				
Unknown		ISOS village: Le Solliat				
Unknown		ISOS hameau: Chez-les-Aubert				

== Le Lieu ==
KGS No.^{?}	Picture	Name	Street Address	CH1903 X coordinate	CH1903 Y coordinate	Location
Unknown		ISOS village: Le Lieu				
Unknown		ISOS village: Le Séchey				

== Les Clées ==
KGS No.^{?}	Picture	Name	Street Address	CH1903 X coordinate	CH1903 Y coordinate	Location
5998	Les Clées Castle With Ruins and Village	Les Clées Castle; With Ruins and Village		525.400	175.960	46.730661°N 6.462665°E
Unknown		ISOS hameau: La Russille				
Unknown		ISOS cas particulier: Les Clées				

== Les Tavernes ==
KGS No.^{?}	Picture	Name	Street Address	CH1903 X coordinate	CH1903 Y coordinate	Location
10992	De haut crêt Cistercian Abbey	De haut crêt Cistercian Abbey		552.350	156.350	46.556734°N 6.817257°E

== Leysin ==
KGS No.^{?}	Picture	Name	Street Address	CH1903 X coordinate	CH1903 Y coordinate	Location
Unknown		ISOS village urbanisé: Leysin				
Unknown		ISOS hameau: Veyges				

== Lignerolle ==
KGS No.^{?}	Picture	Name	Street Address	CH1903 X coordinate	CH1903 Y coordinate	Location
Unknown		ISOS village: Lignerolle				

== L'Isle ==
KGS No.^{?}	Picture	Name	Street Address	CH1903 X coordinate	CH1903 Y coordinate	Location
6111	L'Isle Castle	L'Isle Castle	Rue du château	521.335	163.615	46.619153°N 6.411603°E
Unknown		ISOS cas particulier: L'Isle				

== Lonay ==
KGS No.^{?}	Picture	Name	Street Address	CH1903 X coordinate	CH1903 Y coordinate	Location
Unknown		ISOS village: Lonay				

== Lovatens ==
KGS No.^{?}	Picture	Name	Street Address	CH1903 X coordinate	CH1903 Y coordinate	Location
Unknown		ISOS village: Lovatens				

== Lucens ==
KGS No.^{?}	Picture	Name	Street Address	CH1903 X coordinate	CH1903 Y coordinate	Location
6220	Lucens Castle	Lucens Castle	Rue du château	553.976	173.451	46.710676°N 6.83675°E
Unknown		ISOS petite city / bourg: Lucens				

== Luins ==
KGS No.^{?}	Picture	Name	Street Address	CH1903 X coordinate	CH1903 Y coordinate	Location
11683	Luins Castle	Luins Castle	Au village	510.321	144.340	46.444395°N 6.271569°E
Unknown		ISOS hameau: Luins				

== Lutry ==
KGS No.^{?}	Picture	Name	Street Address	CH1903 X coordinate	CH1903 Y coordinate	Location
6226	Lutry Castle / Rôdeurs Castle	Lutry Castle / Rôdeurs Castle	Rue du château 4	542.295	150.472	46.503068°N 6.686876°E
11783	Roman Catholic Church of Saint-Martin	Roman Catholic Church of Saint-Martin	Route de Taillepied	541.523	150.778	46.505754°N 6.676781°E
6223	Swiss Reformed Church Saint-Martin	Swiss Reformed Church Saint-Martin	Place du temple	542.267	150.412	46.502526°N 6.686519°E
11784	Gothic Facade House	Gothic Facade House	Rue du bourg 8	542.265	150.465	46.503003°N 6.686486°E
Unknown		UNESCO World Heritage Site: Lavaux, Vineyard Terraces				
Unknown		ISOS petite City / bourg: Lutry				
Unknown		ISOS hameau: Châtelard				
Unknown		ISOS hameau: Savuit				

== Maracon ==
KGS No.^{?}	Picture	Name	Street Address	CH1903 X coordinate	CH1903 Y coordinate	Location
10341		Farm House and Rural De Praz-Derrey (Eca 31)	Praz-Derrey	556.441	155.391	46.548386°N 6.870694°E

== Marchissy ==
KGS No.^{?}	Picture	Name	Street Address	CH1903 X coordinate	CH1903 Y coordinate	Location
Unknown		ISOS village: Marchissy				

== Mathod ==
KGS No.^{?}	Picture	Name	Street Address	CH1903 X coordinate	CH1903 Y coordinate	Location
6231	Mathod Castle	Mathod Castle	Route de Suscevaz	533.345	179.781	46.765872°N 6.566042°E

== Mex ==
KGS No.^{?}	Picture	Name	Street Address	CH1903 X coordinate	CH1903 Y coordinate	Location
6233	D'En-Bas Castle	D'En-Bas Castle	Route de Cossonay 1	531.982	158.781	46.57684°N 6.551309°E
Unknown		ISOS village: Mex (VD)				

== Mollens ==
KGS No.^{?}	Picture	Name	Street Address	CH1903 X coordinate	CH1903 Y coordinate	Location
Unknown		ISOS village: Mollens				

== Molondin ==
KGS No.^{?}	Picture	Name	Street Address	CH1903 X coordinate	CH1903 Y coordinate	Location
6236	Saint-Martin-du-Chêne Castle Ruins and an Abandoned Settlement	Saint-Martin-du-Chêne; Castle Ruins and an Abandoned Settlement		548.100	180.710	46.77554°N 6.759087°E
Unknown		ISOS village: Molondin				

== Montanaire ==
KGS No.^{?}	Picture	Name	Street Address	CH1903 X coordinate	CH1903 Y coordinate	Location
Unknown		ISOS village: Denezy				

== Montcherand ==
KGS No.^{?}	Picture	Name	Street Address	CH1903 X coordinate	CH1903 Y coordinate	Location
6239	Swiss Reformed Church of Sainte-Etienne	Swiss Reformed Church of Sainte-Etienne	Au village	529.075	176.130	46.732591°N 6.510713°E
Unknown		ISOS village: Montcherand				

== Mont-la-Ville ==
KGS No.^{?}	Picture	Name	Street Address	CH1903 X coordinate	CH1903 Y coordinate	Location
10993	Rock Shelter at Mollendruz, Prehistoric Settlement	Rock Shelter at Mollendruz, Prehistoric Settlement		518.560	166.520	46.644951°N 6.374863°E

== Montreux ==
KGS No.^{?}	Picture	Name	Street Address	CH1903 X coordinate	CH1903 Y coordinate	Location
8716		Audiorama, Swiss National Audiovisual Museum	Avenue de Chillon 74	560.478	141.637	46.424914°N 6.924504°E
6250	Crêtes Castle	Crêtes Castle	Avenue des Bosquets-de-Julie 13	557.906	143.908	46.445186°N 6.89084°E
6240	Châtelard Castle	Châtelard Castle	Chemin Planchamp-Dessous 1	558.559	144.156	46.447457°N 6.899315°E
6242	Train Station	Train Station	Avenue des Alpes 74	559.399	142.862	46.435869°N 6.91036°E
6243	Hôtel Montreux Palace	Hôtel Montreux Palace		559.150	143.144	46.43839°N 6.907096°E
6251	Ile and Villa Salagnon	Ile and Villa Salagnon	Chemin de l'ile de Salagnon	557.301	143.388	46.44047°N 6.883015°E
6266	Marché couvert	Marché couvert	Grand-Rue	559.351	142.470	46.432339°N 6.90977°E
6246	Caux Palace Hotel	Caux Palace Hotel	Caux, Rue du Panorama 2	561.480	142.437	46.432168°N 6.937472°E
6244	Hôtel des Alpes-Grand Hôtel	Hôtel des Alpes-Grand Hôtel	Avenue de Chillon 78	560.418	141.715	46.425612°N 6.923717°E
6241	Villa Karma	Villa Karma	Rue du lac 171	556.954	143.962	46.445611°N 6.878446°E
Unknown		ISOS village urbanisé:Territet/Veytaux				
Unknown		ISOS cas particulier: Caux				
Unknown		ISOS cas particulier: Montreux				
Unknown		ISOS cas particulier: Villas Dubochet				

== Mont-sur-Rolle ==
KGS No.^{?}	Picture	Name	Street Address	CH1903 X coordinate	CH1903 Y coordinate	Location
Unknown		ISOS village: Mont-sur-Rolle				

== Morges ==
KGS No.^{?}	Picture	Name	Street Address	CH1903 X coordinate	CH1903 Y coordinate	Location
6276		Ancienne auberge de la croix blanche	Grand-Rue 72	527.787	151.271	46.508848°N 6.497763°E
6283	Bâtiment	Bâtiment	Grand-Rue 54	527.808	151.324	46.509327°N 6.498028°E
6287		Bâtiment	Grand-Rue 94	527.727	151.208	46.508275°N 6.496991°E
6277; 8688	Morges Castle and Military Museum of Vaud	Morges Castle and Military Museum of Vaud	Place de la navigation	527.680	151.025	46.506624°N 6.496407°E
6291	City Hall	City Hall	Rue Louis-de-Savoie 70	527.803	151.197	46.508184°N 6.497983°E
9695	Les Roseaux / La Grande Cité, Bronze Age Shore Line Settlement	Les Roseaux / La Grande Cité, Bronze Age Shore Line Settlement		528.600	151.950	46.515043°N 6.50825°E
6281	Temple	Temple	Place de l'église	527.989	151.478	46.510732°N 6.500362°E
Unknown		ISOS petite City / bourg: Morges				

== Moudon ==
KGS No.^{?}	Picture	Name	Street Address	CH1903 X coordinate	CH1903 Y coordinate	Location
10342	Former Granary	Former Granary	Rue du château 21	550.704	168.887	46.669388°N 6.794451°E
6301	Swiss Reformed Church of Saint-Etienne	Swiss Reformed Church of Saint-Etienne	Place Saint-Etienne	551.048	168.756	46.668235°N 6.79896°E
6313	Fountain de Moïse (Moses Fountain)	Fountain de Moïse (Moses Fountain)	Rue du château	550.575	168.900	46.669495°N 6.792764°E
6318	City Hall	City Hall	Place de l'hôtel-de-ville 1	550.922	168.827	46.668864°N 6.797306°E
9114	D'Arnay House	D'Arnay House	Rue du château 34	550.719	168.922	46.669704°N 6.794643°E
9106	États de Vaud House	États de Vaud House	Rue du château 15	550.761	168.885	46.669374°N 6.795196°E
9098	Loys de Villardin House	Loys de Villardin House	Rue Grenade 34	551.070	168.887	46.669415°N 6.799234°E
6311	De Rochefort House	De Rochefort House	Rue du château 50	550.591	168.906	46.669551°N 6.792973°E
11681	Tacheron House	Tacheron House	Grand-Rue 8	550.896	168.854	46.669105°N 6.796964°E
6329	Moudon Castle Tower	Moudon Castle Tower	Rue du château	550.798	168.908	46.669584°N 6.795677°E
Unknown		ISOS petite City / bourg: Moudon				

== Novalles ==
KGS No.^{?}	Picture	Name	Street Address	CH1903 X coordinate	CH1903 Y coordinate	Location
Unknown		ISOS hameau: Novalles				

== Noville ==
KGS No.^{?}	Picture	Name	Street Address	CH1903 X coordinate	CH1903 Y coordinate	Location
Unknown		ISOS village: Noville				

== Nyon ==
KGS No.^{?}	Picture	Name	Street Address	CH1903 X coordinate	CH1903 Y coordinate	Location
6332; 9385	Nyon Castle and the Museum of the History of Porcelain	Nyon Castle and the Museum of the History of Porcelain	Place du château	507.840	137.446	46.38205°N 6.240656°E
9696	Colonia Iulia Equestris, Roman City	Colonia Iulia Equestris, Roman City		507.700	137.500	46.382517°N 6.238826°E
6350	Swiss Reformed Church of Notre-Dame	Swiss Reformed Church of Notre-Dame		507.620	137.310	46.380797°N 6.237824°E
6346	Manoir	Manoir	Rue Maupertuis 2, 4	507.826	137.399	46.381626°N 6.240484°E
11615		Roman Museum	Rue Maupertuis	507.760	137.370	46.381356°N 6.239632°E
9160	Union des associations européennes de football ((UEFA))	Union des associations européennes de football ((UEFA))		507.089	136.224	46.370955°N 6.23114°E
Unknown		ISOS ville: Nyon				

== Ogens ==
KGS No.^{?}	Picture	Name	Street Address	CH1903 X coordinate	CH1903 Y coordinate	Location
Unknown		ISOS village: Ogens				

== Ollon ==
KGS No.^{?}	Picture	Name	Street Address	CH1903 X coordinate	CH1903 Y coordinate	Location
6356	Saint-Triphon et Charpigny, Prehistoric to Medieval Hilltop Settlement	Saint-Triphon et Charpigny, Prehistoric to Medieval Hilltop Settlement		564.320	127.170	46.294992°N 6.975593°E
Unknown		ISOS village: Huémoz				
Unknown		ISOS village: Ollon				

== Onnens ==
KGS No.^{?}	Picture	Name	Street Address	CH1903 X coordinate	CH1903 Y coordinate	Location
6364	Swiss Reformed Church of Saint-Martin	Swiss Reformed Church of Saint-Martin	Rue de l'église	542.600	187.765	46.838549°N 6.686191°E
Unknown		ISOS village: Onnens (VD)				

== Orbe ==
KGS No.^{?}	Picture	Name	Street Address	CH1903 X coordinate	CH1903 Y coordinate	Location
6366		Boscéaz, Gallo-Roman Villa		531.100	177.420	46.744406°N 6.53701°E
6370	Orbe Castle With Its Two Towers and Plaza	Orbe Castle; With Its Two Towers and Plaza		530.750	175.370	46.725931°N 6.53274°E
6367	Reformed Church of Notre-Dame	Reformed Church of Notre-Dame	Rue du château	530.748	175.222	46.724599°N 6.532736°E
6371	City Hall	City Hall	Place du marché 2	530.671	175.181	46.724222°N 6.531735°E
Unknown		ISOS petite City / bourg: Orbe				

== Ormont-Dessous ==
KGS No.^{?}	Picture	Name	Street Address	CH1903 X coordinate	CH1903 Y coordinate	Location
6379	Pont des planches	Pont des planches		570.487	133.866	46.355525°N 7.0552°E
Unknown		ISOS village: La Forclaz				

== Ormont-Dessus ==
KGS No.^{?}	Picture	Name	Street Address	CH1903 X coordinate	CH1903 Y coordinate	Location
10601	Swiss Reformed Church of Saint-Théodule	Swiss Reformed Church of Saint-Théodule	Vers-l'église	576.376	133.636	46.353689°N 7.131722°E
6386		Scierie (Sawmill)		576.100	133.780	46.354974°N 7.128129°E
Unknown		ISOS village: Vers-l'église				
Unknown		ISOS hamlet: La ville				

== Orny ==
KGS No.^{?}	Picture	Name	Street Address	CH1903 X coordinate	CH1903 Y coordinate	Location
Unknown		ISOS village: Orny				

== Oron ==
KGS No.^{?}	Picture	Name	Street Address	CH1903 X coordinate	CH1903 Y coordinate	Location
6391	Temple	Temple		553.129	157.872	46.57048°N 6.82726°E
6392; 9312	Oron Castle and Library	Oron Castle and Library	Petit clos	553.900	158.320	46.574563°N 6.837272°E
Unknown		ISOS cas particulier: Oron-le-Châtel				

== Payerne ==
KGS No.^{?}	Picture	Name	Street Address	CH1903 X coordinate	CH1903 Y coordinate	Location
6400	Payerne Abbey Church and Former Convent Buildings	Payerne Abbey Church and Former Convent Buildings		561.755	185.631	46.820729°N 6.937461°E
10346	Ancien tribunal	Ancien tribunal	Place du marché 3	561.813	185.614	46.82058°N 6.938222°E
10344	Swiss Reformed Church of Notre-Dame	Swiss Reformed Church of Notre-Dame	Rue du temple	561.831	185.644	46.820851°N 6.938456°E
6401	Fountain du Banneret	Fountain du Banneret	Place St. Laurent	561.811	185.654	46.820939°N 6.938193°E
Unknown		ISOS petite City / bourg: Payerne				

== Penthaz ==
KGS No.^{?}	Picture	Name	Street Address	CH1903 X coordinate	CH1903 Y coordinate	Location
8948		Centre d'archivage de la Cinémathèque suisse	Chemin de la Vaux	530.850	161.600	46.602081°N 6.53612°E

== Perroy ==
KGS No.^{?}	Picture	Name	Street Address	CH1903 X coordinate	CH1903 Y coordinate	Location
Unknown		ISOS village: Perroy				

== Prangins ==
KGS No.^{?}	Picture	Name	Street Address	CH1903 X coordinate	CH1903 Y coordinate	Location
6412; 11778	Prangins Castle and Surroundings, National Museum	Prangins Castle and Surroundings, National Museum		508.731	138.779	46.394162°N 6.251975°E
6414	Villa les bleuets	Villa les bleuets	Route de Promenthoux	509.880	138.518	46.391969°N 6.266962°E
Unknown		ISOS village: Prangins				

== Provence ==
KGS No.^{?}	Picture	Name	Street Address	CH1903 X coordinate	CH1903 Y coordinate	Location
10350		Chalet d'alpage la Redalle		539.735	192.409	46.880068°N 6.648024°E
Unknown		ISOS village: Provence				

== Puidoux ==
KGS No.^{?}	Picture	Name	Street Address	CH1903 X coordinate	CH1903 Y coordinate	Location
Unknown		UNESCO World Heritage Site: Lavaux, Vineyard Terraces				
Unknown		ISOS hameau: Treytorrens				

== Pully ==
KGS No.^{?}	Picture	Name	Street Address	CH1903 X coordinate	CH1903 Y coordinate	Location
10459	Gardens of Villa Eupalinos	Gardens of Villa Eupalinos	Chemin de la bruyère 17	540.431	152.775	46.523621°N 6.662297°E
11702	Prieuré, Roman Villa	Prieuré, Roman Villa		540.380	151.190	46.509359°N 6.661837°E
Unknown		ISOS village urbanisé: Pully				

== Rances ==
KGS No.^{?}	Picture	Name	Street Address	CH1903 X coordinate	CH1903 Y coordinate	Location
Unknown		ISOS village: Rances				

== Rivaz ==
KGS No.^{?}	Picture	Name	Street Address	CH1903 X coordinate	CH1903 Y coordinate	Location
Unknown		UNESCO World Heritage Site: Lavaux, Vineyard Terraces				
Unknown		ISOS village: Rivaz				

== Rolle ==
KGS No.^{?}	Picture	Name	Street Address	CH1903 X coordinate	CH1903 Y coordinate	Location
6437; 9313	Rolle Castle and the Library of the Community of Rolle	Rolle Castle and the Library of the Community of Rolle	Grand-Rue 1	515.714	145.850	46.458677°N 6.341468°E
6438	Ile de la Harpe	Ile de la Harpe	Grand-Rue 1	515.550	145.500	46.455508°N 6.339398°E
Unknown		ISOS petite City / bourg: Rolle				

== Romainmôtier-Envy ==
KGS No.^{?}	Picture	Name	Street Address	CH1903 X coordinate	CH1903 Y coordinate	Location
6444	Former Clunic Romainmôtier Abbey	Former Clunic Romainmôtier Abbey	Au village	525.255	171.825	46.693451°N 6.461441°E
9692		Prehistoric / Medieval Foundry		526.550	169.450	46.672232°N 6.47875°E
Unknown		ISOS petite City / bourg: Romainmôtier-Envy				

== Rossinière ==
KGS No.^{?}	Picture	Name	Street Address	CH1903 X coordinate	CH1903 Y coordinate	Location
6456	La maison de la place	La maison de la place	La place	572.632	146.243	46.466953°N 7.082338°E
6457	Grand Chalet	Grand Chalet	Le Borjoz	572.795	146.103	46.4657°N 7.084468°E
Unknown		ISOS village: Rossinière				

== Rougemont ==
KGS No.^{?}	Picture	Name	Street Address	CH1903 X coordinate	CH1903 Y coordinate	Location
6464	Swiss Reformed Church of Saint-Nicolas de Myre	Swiss Reformed Church of Saint-Nicolas de Myre		582.160	148.510	46.487667°N 7.206293°E
Unknown		ISOS village: Rougemont				
Unknown		ISOS hameau: Flendruz				

== Saint-George ==
KGS No.^{?}	Picture	Name	Street Address	CH1903 X coordinate	CH1903 Y coordinate	Location
6481	Mill	Mill	Le moulin	509.872	151.542	46.509114°N 6.264324°E

== Saint-Légier-La Chiésaz ==
KGS No.^{?}	Picture	Name	Street Address	CH1903 X coordinate	CH1903 Y coordinate	Location
6482	Hauteville Castle	Hauteville Castle	Chemin des boulingrins	556.198	146.341	46.466962°N 6.868383°E
6483	Swiss Reformed Church of Notre-Dame	Swiss Reformed Church of Notre-Dame	Chemin de l'église	557.400	146.822	46.471366°N 6.883987°E

== Saint-Livres ==
KGS No.^{?}	Picture	Name	Street Address	CH1903 X coordinate	CH1903 Y coordinate	Location
Unknown		ISOS village: Saint-Livres				

== Saint-Prex ==
KGS No.^{?}	Picture	Name	Street Address	CH1903 X coordinate	CH1903 Y coordinate	Location
6484	Swiss Reformed Church of Notre-Dame	Swiss Reformed Church of Notre-Dame	Rue du Motty	524.727	148.265	46.481473°N 6.458387°E
Unknown		ISOS petite City / bourg: Saint-Prex				

== Saint-Saphorin (Lavaux) ==
KGS No.^{?}	Picture	Name	Street Address	CH1903 X coordinate	CH1903 Y coordinate	Location
6489	Swiss Reformed Church of Saint-Symphorien With Saint-Saphorin Roman Villa	Swiss Reformed Church of Saint-Symphorien With; Saint-Saphorin Roman Villa	Chemin neuf	550.650	147.100	46.473404°N 6.796077°E
Unknown		UNESCO World Heritage Site: Lavaux, Vineyard Terraces				
Unknown		ISOS village: Saint-Saphorin				

== Saint-Sulpice ==
KGS No.^{?}	Picture	Name	Street Address	CH1903 X coordinate	CH1903 Y coordinate	Location
6493	Swiss Reformed Church and Priory of Sainte-Marie-Madeleine	Swiss Reformed Church and Priory of Sainte-Marie-Madeleine	Chemin du crêt	532.538	151.209	46.508786°N 6.559668°E

== Sainte-Croix ==
KGS No.^{?}	Picture	Name	Street Address	CH1903 X coordinate	CH1903 Y coordinate	Location
Unknown		ISOS village urbanisé: L'Auberson				
Unknown		ISOS village urbanisé: Sainte-Croix				
Unknown		ISOS hameau: La Chaux				

== Sergey ==
KGS No.^{?}	Picture	Name	Street Address	CH1903 X coordinate	CH1903 Y coordinate	Location
Unknown		ISOS hameau: Sergey				

== Sottens ==
KGS No.^{?}	Picture	Name	Street Address	CH1903 X coordinate	CH1903 Y coordinate	Location
10354	Emetteur national de Sottens	Emetteur national de Sottens	Route de Peyres-Possens	546.171	167.458	46.656184°N 6.735386°E

== Tartegnin ==
KGS No.^{?}	Picture	Name	Street Address	CH1903 X coordinate	CH1903 Y coordinate	Location
Unknown		ISOS hameau: Tartegnin				

== Tévenon ==
KGS No.^{?}	Picture	Name	Street Address	CH1903 X coordinate	CH1903 Y coordinate	Location
Unknown		ISOS hameau: Vaugondry				

== Trey ==
KGS No.^{?}	Picture	Name	Street Address	CH1903 X coordinate	CH1903 Y coordinate	Location
Unknown		ISOS village: Trey				

== Treytorrens ==
KGS No.^{?}	Picture	Name	Street Address	CH1903 X coordinate	CH1903 Y coordinate	Location
6505	Swiss Reformed Church of Saint-Jean-Baptiste	Swiss Reformed Church of Saint-Jean-Baptiste	Au village	551.280	180.190	46.771103°N 6.800777°E
Unknown		ISOS village: Treytorrens (Payerne)				

== Ursins ==
KGS No.^{?}	Picture	Name	Street Address	CH1903 X coordinate	CH1903 Y coordinate	Location
6506		Roman Sanctuary		541.120	176.300	46.735292°N 6.668267°E

== Valbroye ==
KGS No.^{?}	Picture	Name	Street Address	CH1903 X coordinate	CH1903 Y coordinate	Location
Unknown		ISOS village: Combremont-le-Petit				
Unknown		ISOS village urbanisé: Granges-près-Marnand				
Unknown		ISOS village: Sassel				

== Valeyres-sous-Rances ==
KGS No.^{?}	Picture	Name	Street Address	CH1903 X coordinate	CH1903 Y coordinate	Location
6509	Bonstetten House	Bonstetten House	Rue du village 5	530.229	178.355	46.752726°N 6.525471°E
Unknown		ISOS village: Valeyres-sous-Rances				

== Vallorbe ==
KGS No.^{?}	Picture	Name	Street Address	CH1903 X coordinate	CH1903 Y coordinate	Location
6513	International Train Station	International Train Station	Rue de la gare 1	518.337	174.017	46.712357°N 6.370618°E
Unknown		ISOS village urbanisé: Vallorbe				

== Vaulion ==
KGS No.^{?}	Picture	Name	Street Address	CH1903 X coordinate	CH1903 Y coordinate	Location
Unknown		ISOS village urbanisé: Vaulion				

== Vevey ==
KGS No.^{?}	Picture	Name	Street Address	CH1903 X coordinate	CH1903 Y coordinate	Location
8707	Alimentarium, Museum of Food	Alimentarium, Museum of Food	Quai Perdonnet 25	554.507	145.398	46.458367°N 6.846462°E
6521; 8898	Administration Building and Historical Archives of Nestlé SA	Administration Building and Historical Archives of Nestlé SA	Avenue Nestlé 55	553.610	146.331	46.466698°N 6.834693°E
6516	Aile Castle	Aile Castle	Grande place 1	554.086	145.502	46.459274°N 6.840972°E
6525	Cour au chantre	Cour au chantre	Rue du Simplon 22	554.449	145.588	46.460072°N 6.845688°E
6517	Roman Catholic Church of Notre-Dame	Roman Catholic Church of Notre-Dame	Rue des chenevières	555.001	145.442	46.458796°N 6.852888°E
6528	Orthodox Church	Orthodox Church	Rue des Communaux 12	554.453	145.789	46.46188°N 6.845721°E
6519	Swiss Reformed Church of Saint-Martin	Swiss Reformed Church of Saint-Martin	Boulevard Saint-Martin	554.550	145.820	46.462166°N 6.84698°E
6533	City Hall	City Hall	Rue du lac 2	554.560	145.460	46.458928°N 6.847146°E
6534	Hôtel des Trois-Couronnes	Hôtel des Trois-Couronnes	Rue du château 1	554.657	145.382	46.458233°N 6.848416°E
6532	La Grenette and place du marché	La Grenette and place du marché	Grande place 29	554.222	145.630	46.460434°N 6.842729°E
8708		Museum de la confrérie des vignerons	Rue du château 2	554.704	145.363	46.458065°N 6.849029°E
8717	Museum Jenisch (Musée des Beaux-Arts, Cabinet cantonal des estampes)	Museum Jenisch (Musée des Beaux-Arts, Cabinet cantonal des estampes)	Avenue de la gare 2	538.495	152.049	46.516916°N 6.637165°E
8718	Museum suisse de l'appareil photographique	Museum suisse de l'appareil photographique	Grande place	554.120	145.575	46.459933°N 6.841407°E
11688	Saint-Jean Tower and Fountain	Saint-Jean Tower and Fountain	Rue du lac	554.559	145.461	46.458937°N 6.847133°E
Unknown		ISOS ville: Vevey				

== Veytaux ==
KGS No.^{?}	Picture	Name	Street Address	CH1903 X coordinate	CH1903 Y coordinate	Location
6544	Chillon Castle	Chillon Castle	Avenue du Chillon 21	560.703	140.445	46.414204°N 6.927532°E
9513	Viaduc autoroutier de Chillon sur la N9	Viaduc autoroutier de Chillon sur la N9		560.920	140.370	46.413542°N 6.93036°E
Unknown		ISOS village urbanisé:Territet/Veytaux				
Unknown		ISOS cas particulier: Castle de Chillon				

== Villarzel ==
KGS No.^{?}	Picture	Name	Street Address	CH1903 X coordinate	CH1903 Y coordinate	Location
Unknown		ISOS village: Villarzel				

== Villeneuve ==
KGS No.^{?}	Picture	Name	Street Address	CH1903 X coordinate	CH1903 Y coordinate	Location
Unknown		ISOS petite City / bourg: Villeneuve				

== Vinzel ==
KGS No.^{?}	Picture	Name	Street Address	CH1903 X coordinate	CH1903 Y coordinate	Location
Unknown		ISOS hameau: Vinzel				

== Vufflens-la-Ville ==
KGS No.^{?}	Picture	Name	Street Address	CH1903 X coordinate	CH1903 Y coordinate	Location
Unknown		ISOS village: Vufflens-la-Ville				

== Vufflens-le-Château ==
KGS No.^{?}	Picture	Name	Street Address	CH1903 X coordinate	CH1903 Y coordinate	Location
6561	Vufflens Castle	Vufflens Castle	Chemin de la balle 1	526.161	153.069	46.524844°N 6.476292°E
Unknown		ISOS cas particulier: Vufflens-le-Château				

== Vullierens ==
KGS No.^{?}	Picture	Name	Street Address	CH1903 X coordinate	CH1903 Y coordinate	Location
6563	Vullierens Castle and Surroundings	Vullierens Castle and Surroundings	Rue du château	526.498	158.197	46.571007°N 6.479867°E
Unknown		ISOS village: Vullierens				

== Vully-les-Lacs ==
KGS No.^{?}	Picture	Name	Street Address	CH1903 X coordinate	CH1903 Y coordinate	Location
6330	Guévaux Castle	Guévaux Castle		570.900	198.630	46.93812°N 7.056468°E
Unknown		ISOS hameau: Cotterd				
Unknown		ISOS hameau: Vallamand-Dessous				

== Yens ==
KGS No.^{?}	Picture	Name	Street Address	CH1903 X coordinate	CH1903 Y coordinate	Location
Unknown		ISOS village: Yens				

== Yverdon-les-Bains ==
KGS No.^{?}	Picture	Name	Street Address	CH1903 X coordinate	CH1903 Y coordinate	Location
9314	Public Library of Yverdon-les-Bains	Public Library of Yverdon-les-Bains	Place de l'Ancienne-Poste 4	538.957	181.305	46.780117°N 6.639301°E
6564; 8709	Castle and Museum	Castle and Museum	Place Pestalozzi	539.108	181.093	46.778224°N 6.641307°E
9679	Clendy, Littoral Settlement and Prehistoric Megalithic Site	Clendy, Littoral Settlement and Prehistoric Megalithic Site		540.300	181.400	46.781094°N 6.656874°E
6585	Eburodunum, Celtic Oppidum, Roman Vicus, Medieval and Modern Village	Eburodunum, Celtic Oppidum, Roman Vicus, Medieval and Modern Village		539.130	180.670	46.774422°N 6.641651°E
6566	Town Hall	Town Hall	Place Pestalozzi 1	539.079	181.104	46.778321°N 6.640926°E
10355	Former Hôtel de l'Aigle	Former Hôtel de l'Aigle	Place Pestalozzi 2	539.035	181.109	46.778362°N 6.640349°E
6567	Thorens House (Formerly Steiner House)	Thorens House (Formerly Steiner House)	Rue du four 17	538.950	181.100	46.778273°N 6.639237°E
6568	Temple	Temple	Place Pestalozzi / Rue du lac	539.058	181.158	46.778804°N 6.640643°E
6586	Villa d'Entremont	Villa d'Entremont	Avenue des bains 20	539.696	180.428	46.772296°N 6.649093°E

== See also ==
- List of cultural property of regional significance in Switzerland: Vaud
