= Swiss Reformed Church of Saint-Maurice, Chavornay =

Protestant parish church in Chavornay, Vaud, Switzerland

Chavornay Temple
- Temple de Chavornay (French)
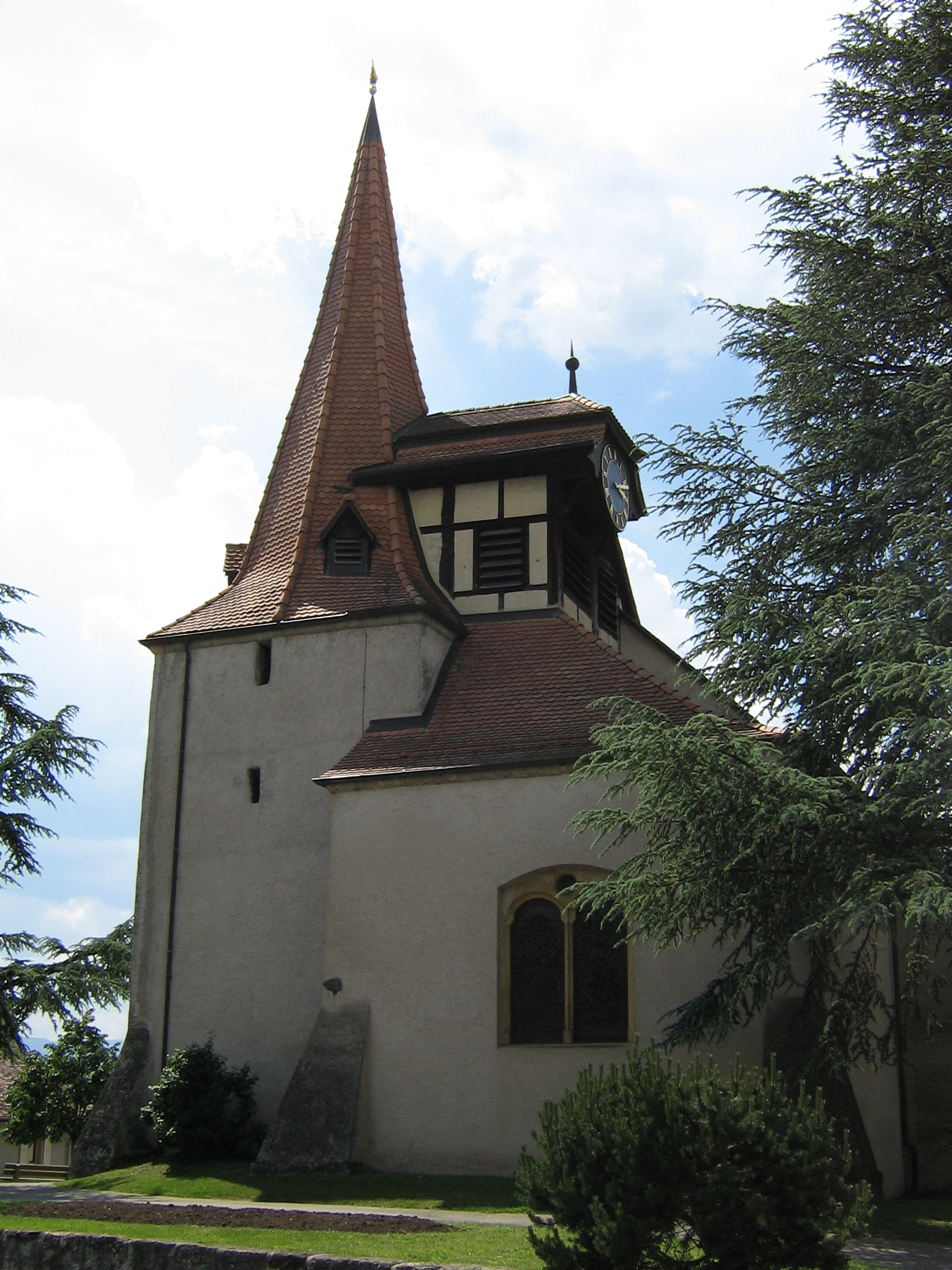

- Location within Switzerland Location within Canton of Vaud
- 46°42′06″N 06°34′13″E
- Type: Parish church of the Evangelical Reformed Church of the Canton of Vaud
- Location: Chavornay, canton of Vaud, Switzerland

Swiss Cultural Property of National Significance
- Official name: Eglise réformée Saint-Maurice
- Reference no.: 5984

The Swiss Reformed Church of Saint-Maurice (French: église réformée Saint-Maurice), also named Church of Saint Marcel or simply the Chavornay Temple (French: temple de Chavornay), is a Protestant church in the municipality of Chavornay, Vaud, Switzerland. It is a parish church of the Evangelical Reformed Church of the Canton of Vaud. It was listed as a heritage site of national significance.

== History ==
The church was already mentioned in the 12th century. It was re-built and altered several times. The oldest preserved parts date back to 1400. In the 15th century, the nave was covered with a wooden curved ceiling that symbolises the vault of the sky and hides the apparent flaws. In the 16th century, the nave was separated into three parts by two pillars and the Gothic window of the choir was enlarged. Under this window, a communion table was made from a slab of a former baptismal font.

The church is located on a hill that overlooks the village. It was listed among the Swiss Cultural Property of National Significance. The vicarage located next to the church is the seat of the Chavornay parish which also includes the communes of Bavois, Essert-Pittet and Corcelles-sur-Chavornay.

== See also ==
- List of cultural property of national significance in Switzerland: Vaud
