= Reformed Church of Notre-Dame, Orbe =

Reformed church building in Orbe, Vaud, Switzerland

- Église réformée Notre-Dame d'Orbe (French)
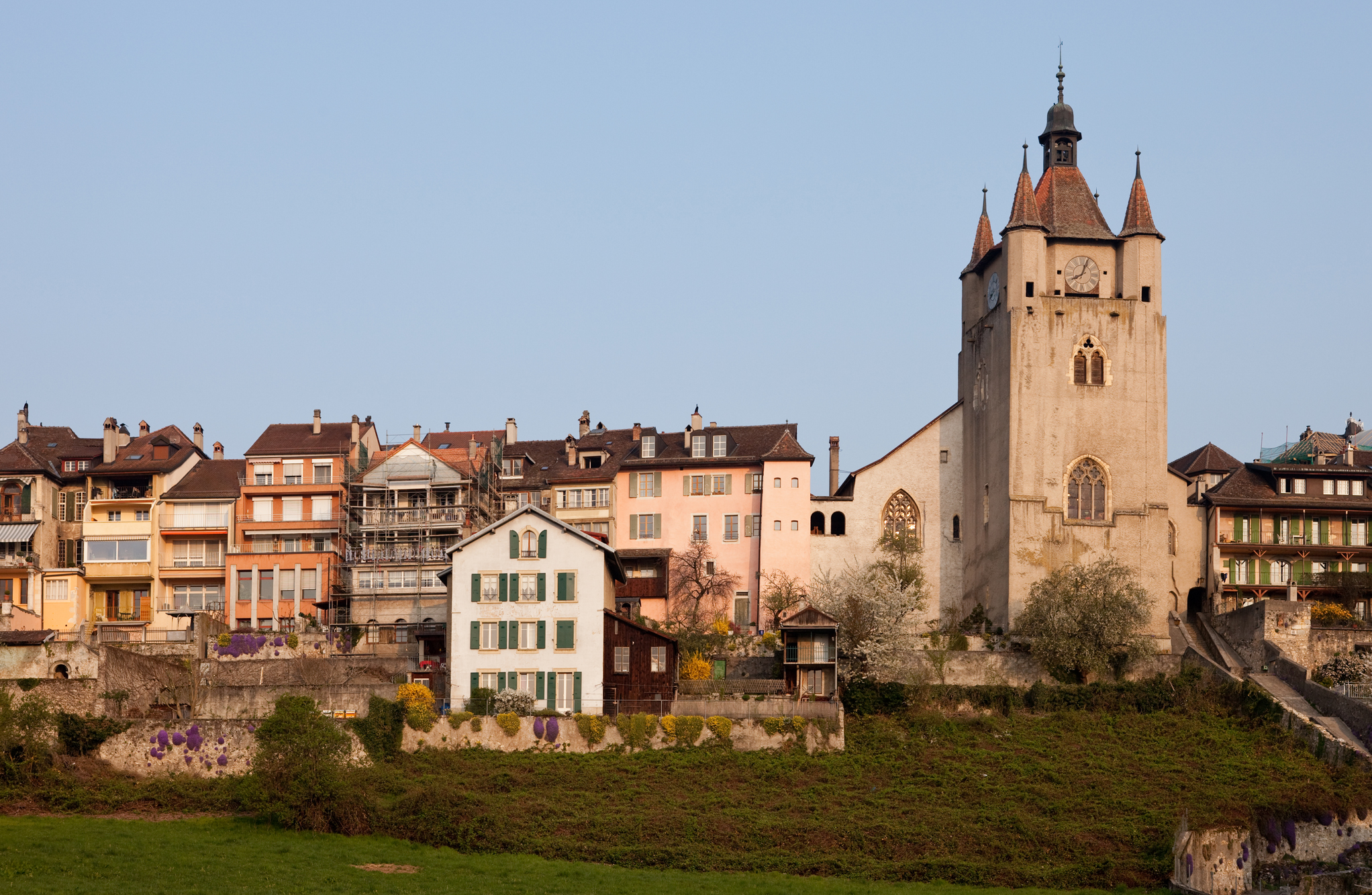
- The church and the surrounding buildings

- Location within Switzerland Location within Canton of Vaud
- 46°43′29″N 06°31′58″E
- Type: Parish church of the Evangelical Reformed Church of the Canton of Vaud
- Location: Orbe, canton of Vaud, Switzerland

History
- Built: Until 1525; Enlarged 1687

Site notes
- Architect(s): Balthazar Huguenin and Balthazar Jeanneret; Antoine Lagniaz
- Architectural style: Gothic

Swiss Cultural Property of National Significance
- Official name: Eglise réformée Notre-Dame
- Reference no.: 6367

Orbe Temple, also known as the Reformed Church of Notre-Dame (French: église réformée Notre-Dame) or the Great Church of Orbe (French: Grande Église d'Orbe), is a Protestant church in the municipality of Orbe, canton of Vaud, Switzerland. It is a parish church of the Evangelical Reformed Church of the Canton of Vaud. It is listed as a heritage site of national significance.

== History ==
The Great Church of Orbe was founded in the 12th century and destroyed for the first time in 1407 by a fire that devastated the whole building except the four walls and a few pillars. The church was re-built beginning in 1408 and completed a century later by Balthazar Huguenin and Balthazar Jeanneret with the walls included in the city walls. The works were ended by architect Antoine Lagniaz, who re-built the nave and the side aisles between 1521 and 1525. Moreover, three side chapels were enlarged in 1687.

The Post-Gothic church has five naves and notably features statues on the keystone, as well as capitals that represent Jesus Christ and the Virgin Mary surrounded by angels.

After the city was conquered by the canton of Bern in 1536 and after the introduction of the Reformation, the church became a temple and was shared by both faiths. The Protestant progressively made exclusive use of the building and installed a statue of reformer Pierre Viret (a native of Orbe) in the building in 1911.

The temple was listed among the Swiss Cultural Property of National Significance.

== See also ==
- List of cultural property of national significance in Switzerland: Vaud

== Bibliography ==
- Naef, Albert (1903). Orbe: le château et l'église : communication (in French). L. Vincent.
- Gilliard, Frédéric (1934). L'église d'Orbe: étude historique et archéologique. Pro Urba / Association du vieil Orbe (in French). Vol. 5. Librairie Jaques.
