= Synagogue of Lausanne =

Synagogue in Lausanne, Switzerland

- French: Synagogue de Lausanne
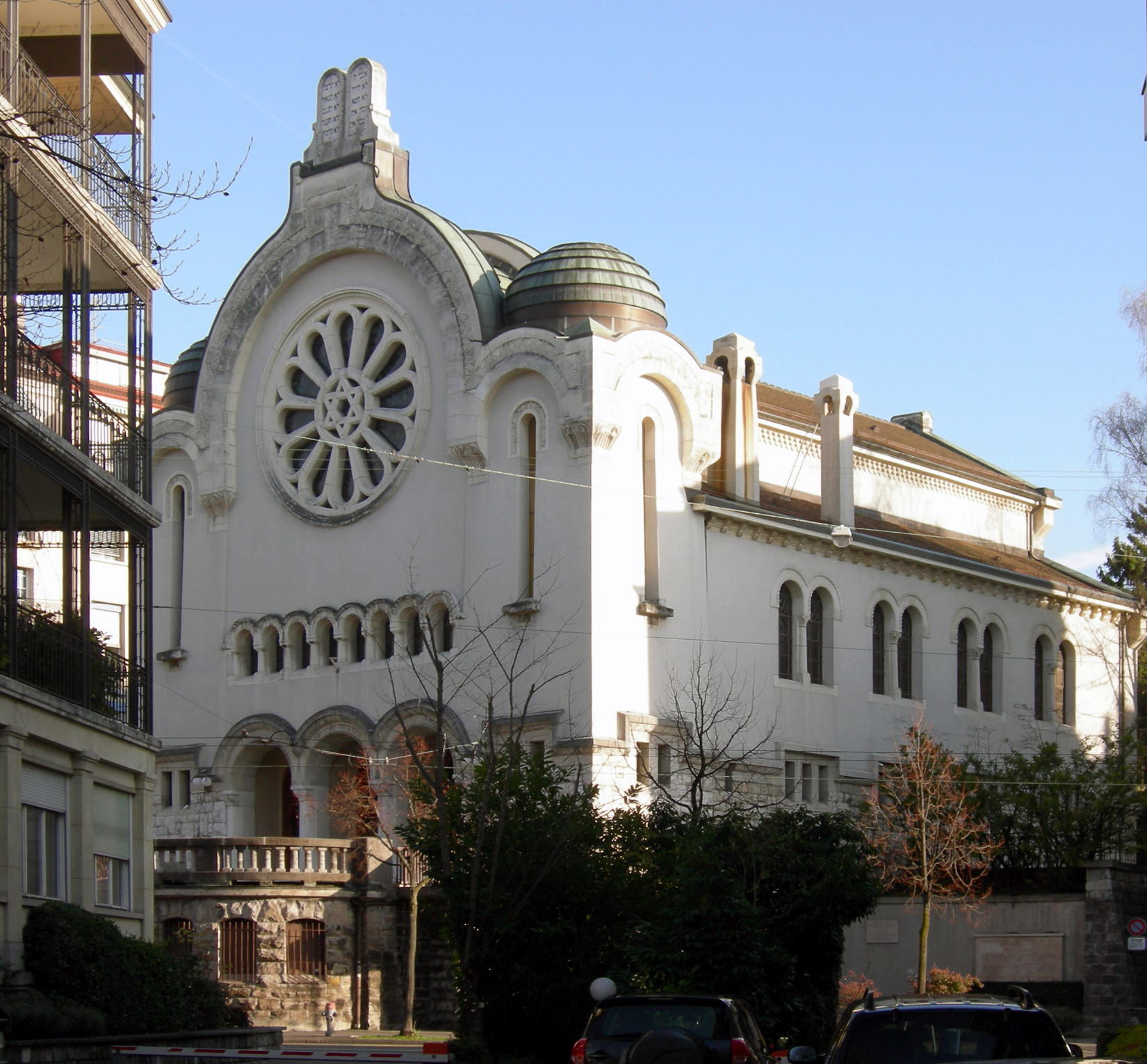
- The synagogue façade in 2008

- Location of the synagogue in the Canton of Vaud

Religion
- Affiliation: Judaism
- Rite: Nusach Ashkenaz
- Ecclesiastical or organizational status: Synagogue
- Ownership: Communauté Israélite de Lausanne et du ct de Vaud / Israelite Community of Lausanne and the Canton of Vaud (CILV)
- Status: Active

Location
- Location: 1 Avenue de Florimont in Lausanne, Vaud
- Country: Switzerland
- Interactive map of Synagogue of Lausanne
- Coordinates: 46°30′59″N 6°38′16″E

Architecture
- Architects: Charles-François Bonjour; Oscar Oulevey; Andrien Van Dorsser
- Type: Synagogue architecture
- Style: Romanesque Revival; Byzantine Revival
- Established: c. 1900 (as a congregation)
- Groundbreaking: 1908
- Completed: 1910

Specifications
- Dome: Two
- Materials: Brick

Swiss Cultural Property of National Significance
- Official name: Synagogue
- Reference no.: 6202

The Synagogue of Lausanne (French: Synagogue de Lausanne) is a Jewish congregation and synagogue, located at 1 Avenue de Florimont in Lausanne, Vaud, Switzerland. The building is a Cultural Property of National Significance.

== History ==
In the early 20th century, the Jewish community gathered in the Jean-Jacques Mercier building on Rue du Grand-Chêne in Lausanne. The community grew rapidly and wanted to have a larger place of worship.

Upon the death of French merchant Daniel Iffla ("Osiris"), the City Council of Lausanne received a bequest of 50,000 francs. This donation aimed at building a new synagogue which had to be inspired from the Buffault Synagogue in Paris.

The synagogue was built in 1909–1910 thanks to the financial support of the local Ashkenazi community. The City of Lausanne also allocated 300,000 francs for the construction. The building was designed by Vaudois architects Charles Bonjour, Adrien van Dorsser and Oscar Oulevey and inaugurated on November 7, 1910.

The cost of land acquisition and construction totalled 280,000 francs, including 48,000 francs for the structural system and 28,000 francs for the decoration and the furniture.

After WWII, the community grew and integrated Sepharadi Jews, which requested unity in the rites and the use of the synagogue.

In 2010, Israelite Community of Lausanne and the Canton of Vaud (CILV) celebrated the centenary of the synagogue and organised events aimed at "forging bonds with Lausanne and Vaud people", including an exhibition about the history of the synagogue.

The synagogue is now listed among the Cultural Property of National Significance. It is used for Shabbat celebrations, but usually the daily service takes place in a smaller underground room. In 1995, a liturgical music concert took place at the synagogue.

== Architecture ==
The Romanesque-Byzantine synagogue has a long nave that can be reached from the vestibule. Three sides of the nave are bordered by galleries with 160 seats for women. The stalls are dedicated to men only. The Almemohr has a tabernacle with the Torah scrolls, as well as the seat used by the rabbi. The paintings were made by Otto Alfred Briffod and the stained-glass windows were manufactured by the workshop Guignard & Schmid. There is an adjacent sacristy. The underground floor has several locales.

== See also ==
- History of the Jews in Switzerland
- List of synagogues in Switzerland
- List of cultural property of national significance in Switzerland: Vaud

== Bibliography ==
- Lévy, Ronald; Shamgar, Eran (2010). La Synagogue de Lausanne: 100 ans de présence en Belle Fontaine (in French). Israelite community of Lausanne and the Canton of Vaud.
- Epstein-Mil, Ron; Richter, Michael (2015). Les synagogues de Suisse : construire entre émancipation, assimilation et acculturation (in French). Neuchâtel: Alphil..
