= Saint Barbara Church, Vevey =

Russian Orthodox church building in Vevey, Vaud, Switzerland

Russian Orthodox Church of Saint Megalomartyr Barbara
- Église orthodoxe russe de la sainte mégalomartyre Barbara (French)
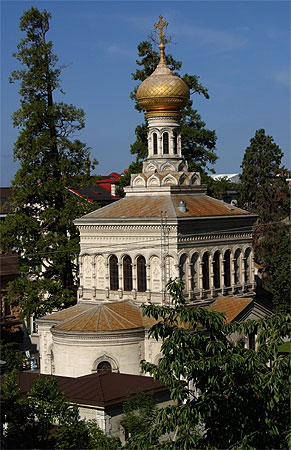

- Location within Switzerland Location within Canton of Vaud
- 46°27′43″N 06°50′45″E
- Type: Parish church of the Russian Orthodox Church Outside Russia
- Location: Vevey, canton of Vaud, Switzerland

History
- Built: 1878

Site notes
- Architect(s): Antonovitch Monighetti; Samuel Késer

Swiss Cultural Property of National Significance
- Official name: Eglise orthodoxe
- Designated: 1977
- Reference no.: 6528

The Russian Orthodox Church, also called the Russian Orthodox Church of Saint Megalomartyr Barbara (French: Église orthodoxe russe de la sainte mégalomartyre Barbara; Russian: Це́рковь свято́й великому́ченицы Варва́ры), is a Russian Orthodox Church in Vevey, canton of Vaud, Switzerland. It is listed as a heritage site of national significance.

== History ==
In the 19th century, an important Russian population resided around Lake Geneva, mainly in Geneva (bourgeois families) and Montreux/Vevey (nobility). One of the most prominent Russians in Vevey, Count Schouwaloff, saw his spouse and his only daughter Barbara die. Barbara was married either to Prince Dolgorouki or to Count Orloff, depending on the sources. Schouwaloff wanted to immortalise the memory of his daughter and built an Orthodox church dedicated to the Great Martyr Barbara.

The church was designed in Saint Petersburg by Ippolito Antonovitch Monighetti between 1875 and 1878. It was built by Vaudois architect Samuel Késer and consecrated on November 1, 1878. It became a parish church in 1949 and was listed among the Cultural Property of National Significance in 1977. For a long time, the administration of the church aroused controversy between the churches of Vevey and Geneva.

== See also ==
- List of cultural property of national significance in Switzerland: Vaud

== Bibliography ==
- Vernaz, Michel (2011). Église orthodoxe russe de la sainte Mégalomartyre Barbara de Vevey (PDF) (in French).
