= Château des Crêtes =

Castle in Montreux, Switzerland

- Chateau des Crêtes
- Montreux in Switzerland
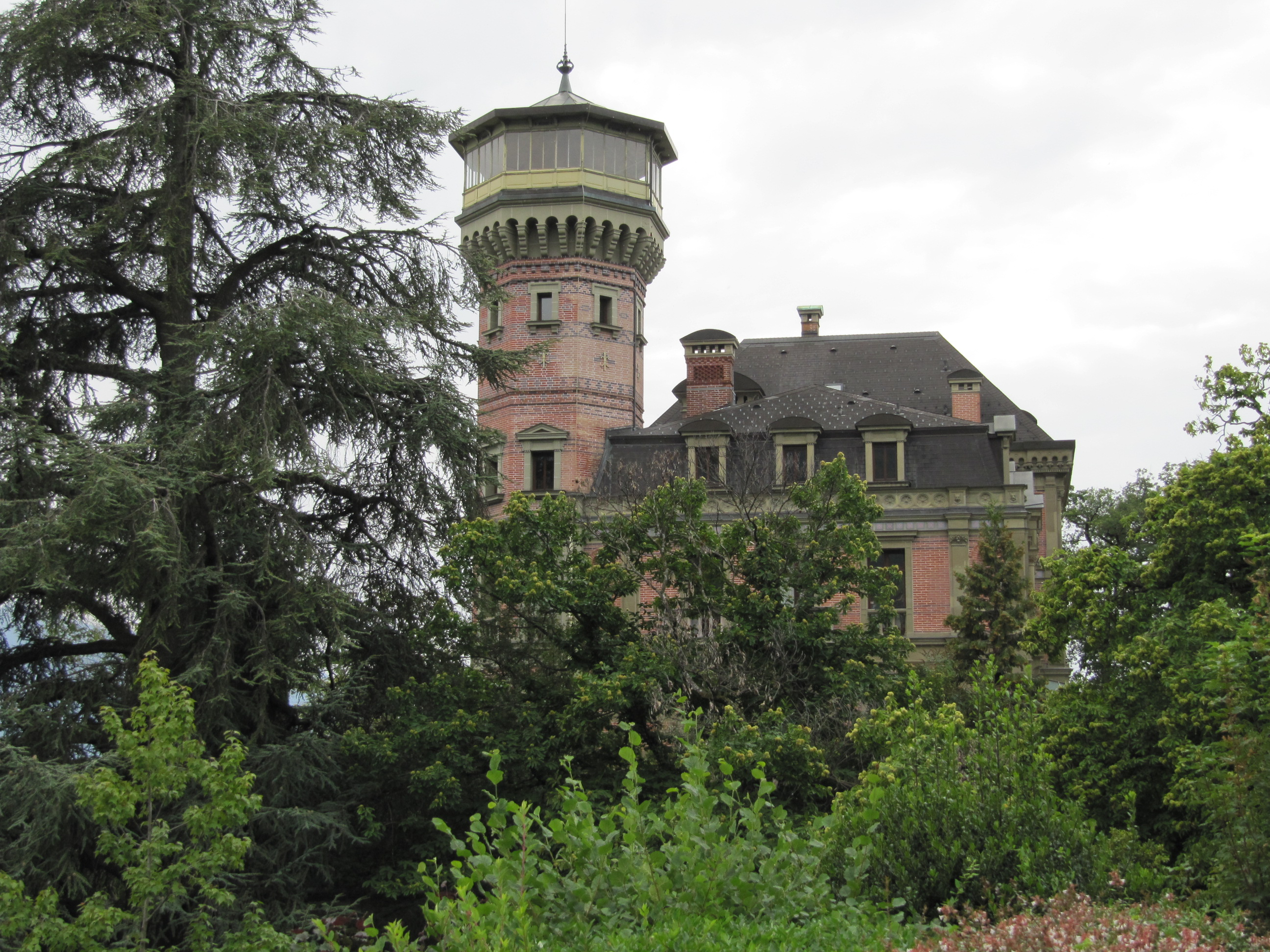
- Exterior of the château

Location
- Coordinates: 46°26′43″N 6°53′27″E

Garrison information
- Occupants: Vincent Dubochet

Swiss Cultural Property of National Significance

Château des Crêtes is a château in the municipality of Montreux of the Canton of Vaud in Switzerland. It is a Swiss heritage site of national significance.
