= Dully Castle =

Castle in Dully, Switzerland

- Dully in Switzerland
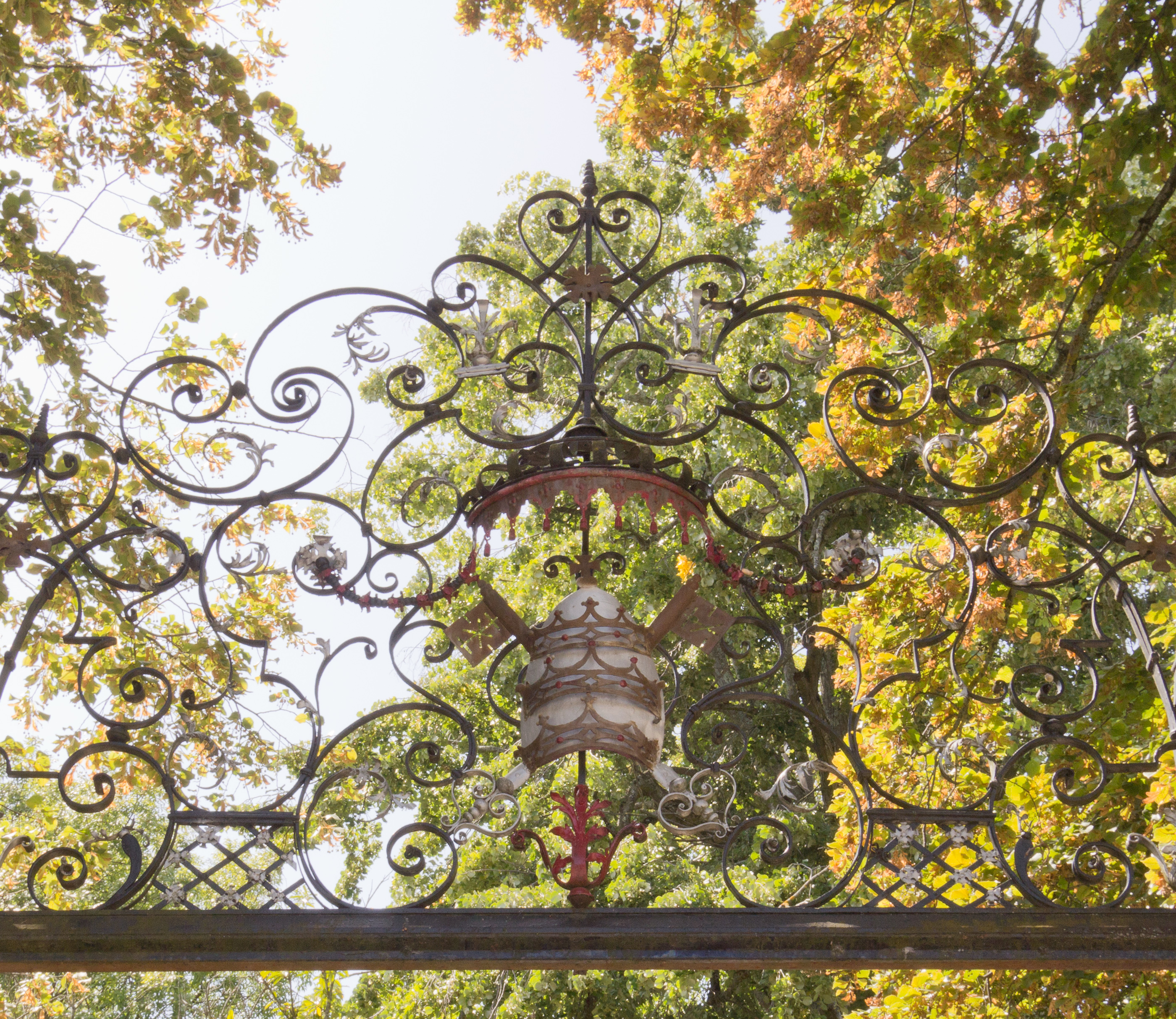
- Decorative ironwork above the gates of Dully Castle

Location
- Coordinates: 46°25′46″N 6°17′42″E

Swiss Cultural Property of National Significance

Dully Castle is a castle in the municipality of Dully of the Canton of Vaud in Switzerland. It is a Swiss heritage site of national significance.

== See also ==
- List of castles in Switzerland
- Château
