= Châtelard Castle, Vaud =

Castle in Montreux, Switzerland

Châtelard Castle
- Montreux in Switzerland
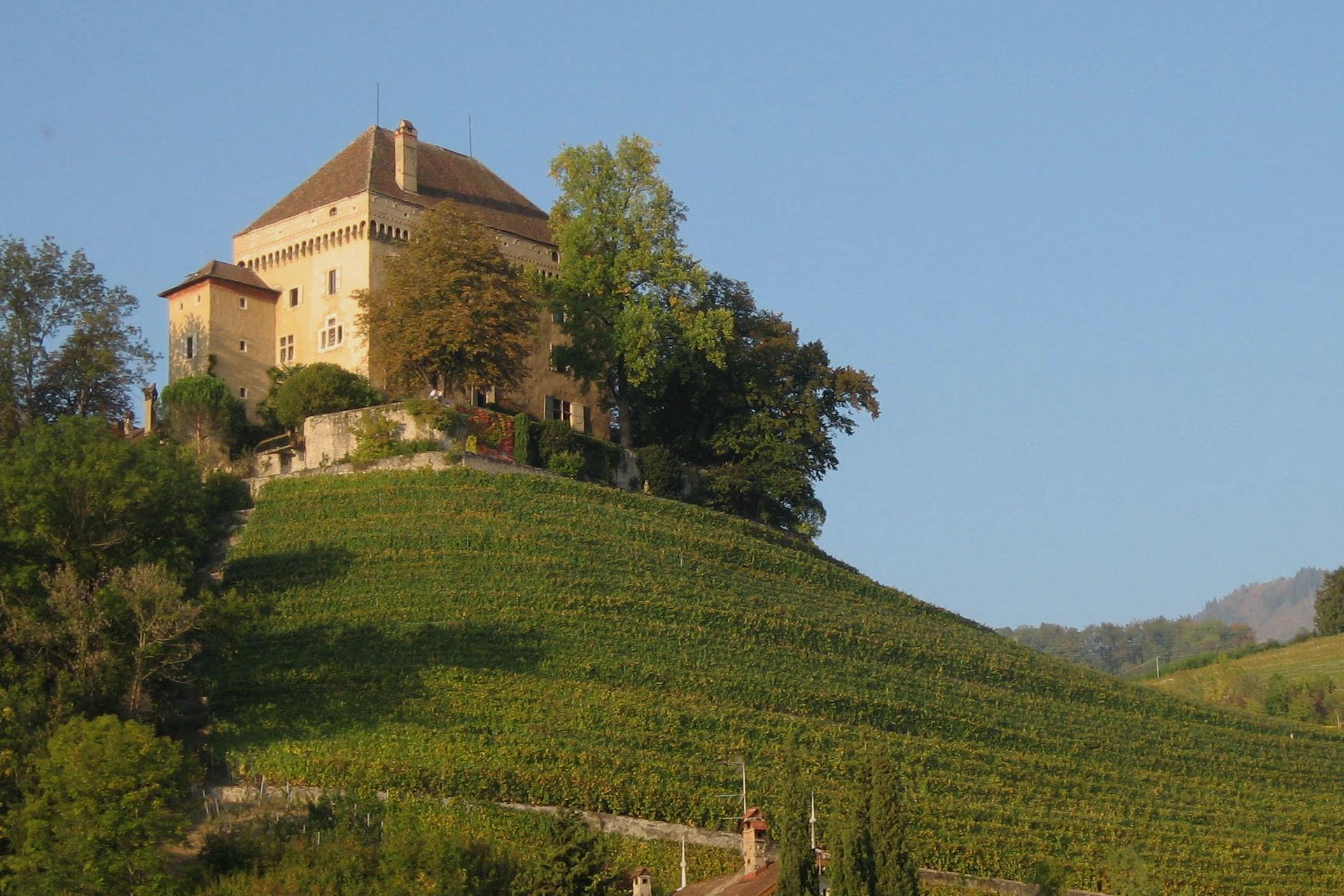
- View of the castle

Location
- Location within Canton of Vaud Location within Switzerland
- Coordinates: 46°26′51″N 6°53′58″E

Swiss Cultural Property of National Significance

Châtelard Castle is a castle in the municipality of Montreux of the Canton of Vaud in Switzerland. It is a Swiss heritage site of national significance.

== History ==
The first "Châtelard", dating back to around the year 1000 , is the work of the Burgundians. There are practically no traces of this wooden building left.

In 1295, La vidamie de Montreux (in the parish of Montreux) was purchased by Girard d'Oron from the Bishop of Sion. In 1317, Girard II ceded the part that would become Les Planches to the Count of Savoy while the lordship of Châtelard was retained; since that date and for the next 600 years, Châtelard was separated from Montreux . By marriage, it returned in 1338 to François, Baron de La Sarraz, bailiff of Vaud and Chablais. In 1352, Count Amédée VI of Savoy asked him to build a fortified castle to serve as a refuge in the event of an invasion. The construction was finally undertaken by Jean de Gingins, husband of Marguerite de La Sarraz, from 1440 to 1442 . In 1457, he confirmed the franchises of the parish of Montreux (1449).

The castle was then pillaged and partially burned in 1476 during the Burgundian Wars by the army of Gruyère supported by Gessenay and Pays-d'Enhaut. The Gingins were stripped of their property. The estate then passed through several hands, including the town of Vevey between 1571 and 1573, to finally become the property of the Bernese Emmanuel Bondeli, who was bailiff of Aubonne. It remained in this family until the Vaudois revolution of 1798.

Around the 1770s, the walls of the castle's great hall were decorated with a landscape, undoubtedly by the painter Gottfried Locher .

Much later, the communes of Châtelard and Planches merged to form the commune of Montreux in 1961. The château was bought by the Fornerod family in 1983, then sold in 2015 to a Geneva investment fund.

== Description ==
The castle is classified as a cultural property of national importance.

It is presented as a cubic keep of masonry crowned with bricks, of an appearance identical to the Saint-Maire castle of Lausanne. It is located in the center of an estate, mainly wine-growing, of 29,000m ^{2} from which a pinot noir called Grand cru Château du Châtelard Lavaux AOC is produced.

== See also ==
- List of castles in Switzerland
- Château
