= Lutry Castle =

Castle in Lutry, Switzerland

Lutry Castle Rôdeurs Castle
- Château des Rôdeurs à Lutry
- Lutry in Switzerland
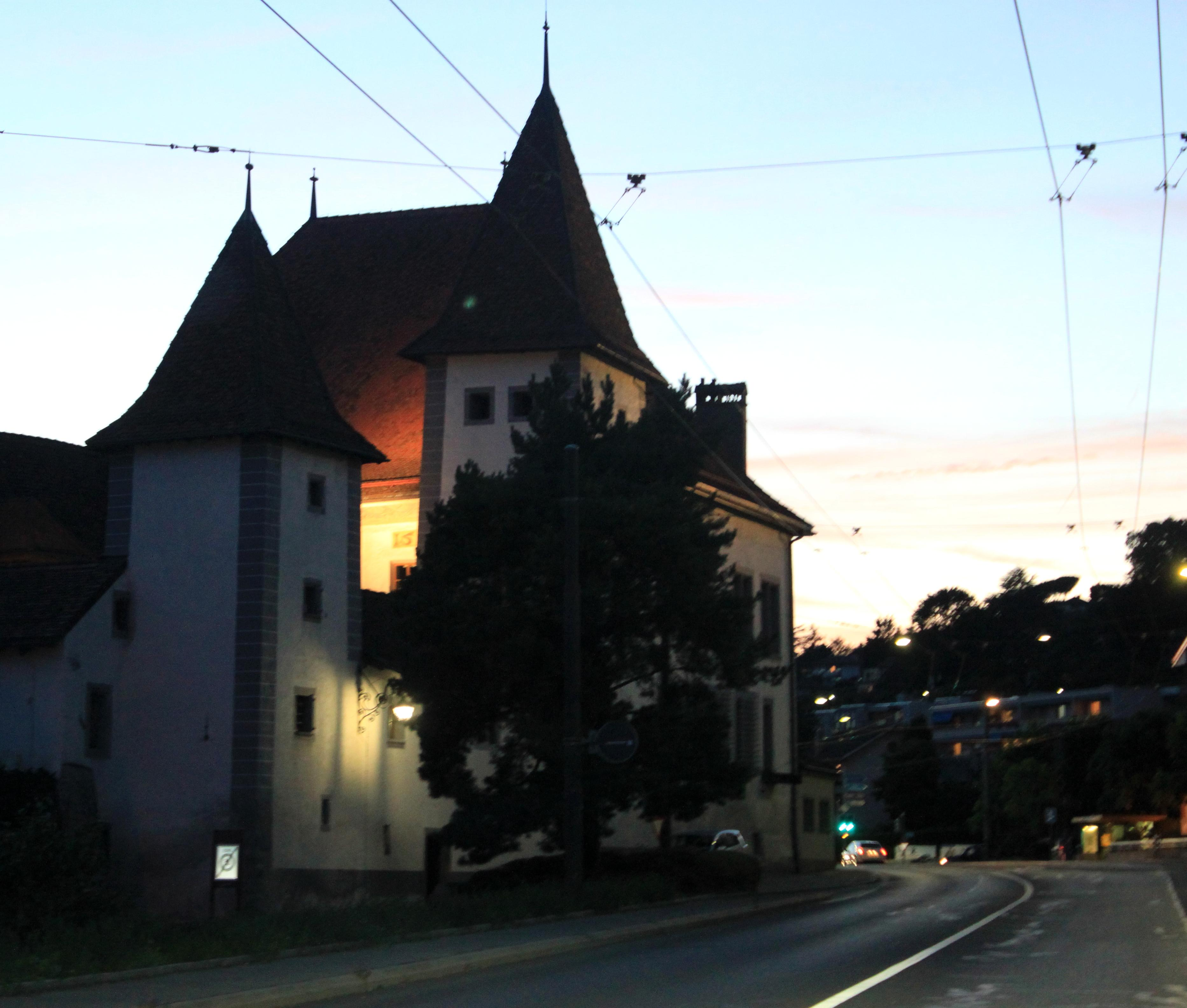

Site information
- Owner: Lutry municipality

Location
- Coordinates: 46°30′11″N 6°41′13″E

Site history
- Built: 16th century

Garrison information
- Occupants: Family of the Mayor of Lutry

Swiss Cultural Property of National Significance

Lutry Castle or Rôdeurs Castle is a medieval castle in the Swiss municipality of Lutry in the canton of Vaud. It is a Swiss heritage site of national significance.

== See also ==
- List of castles in Switzerland
- Château
