= D'En-Bas Castle =

Castle in Mex, Switzerland

- Château d'En-Bas
- Mex in Switzerland
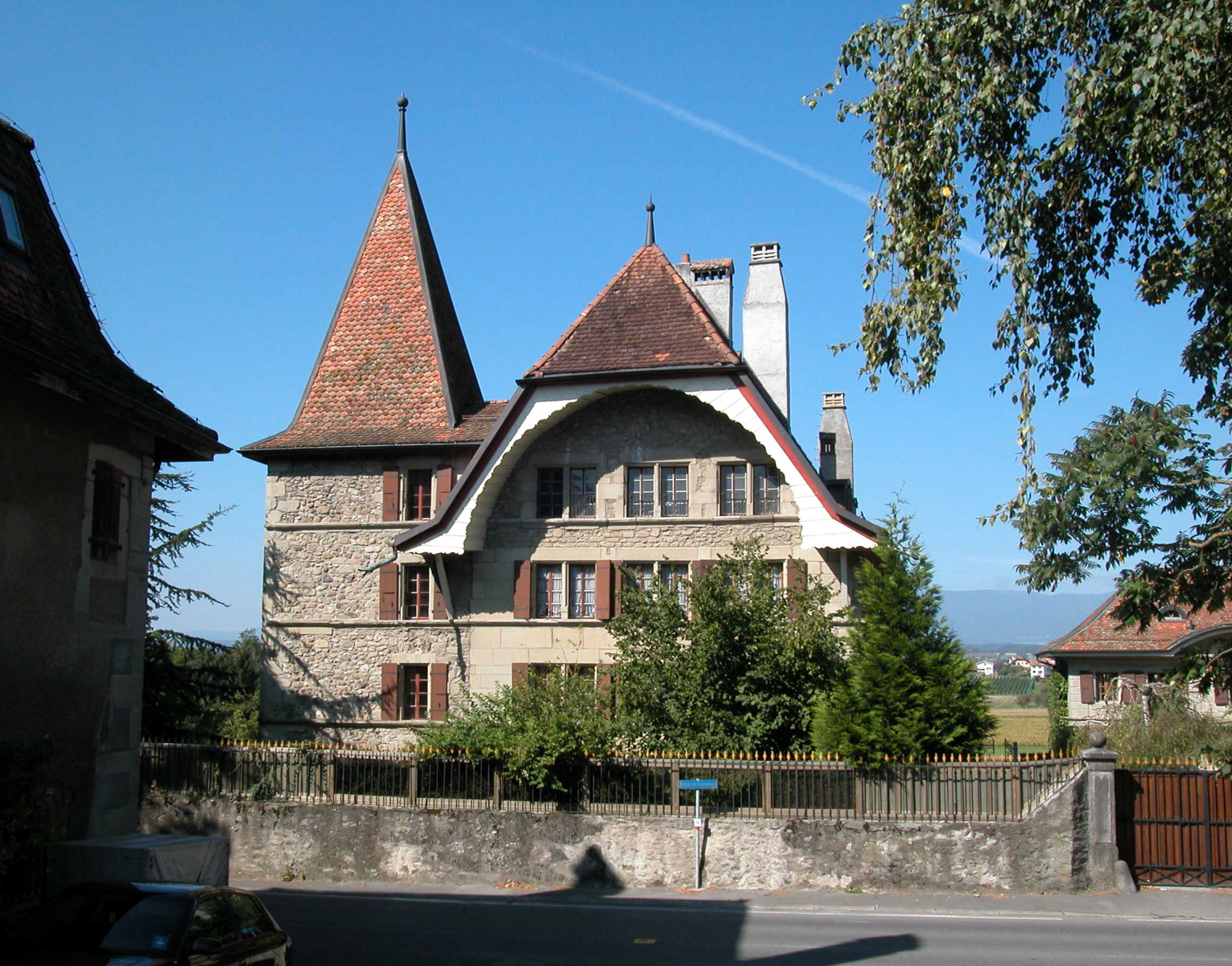
- View of the castle

Location
- Coordinates: 46°34′37″N 6°33′05″E

Site history
- Built: 1403

Swiss Cultural Property of National Significance

D’En-Bas Castle is a castle in the municipality of Mex of the Canton of Vaud in Switzerland. It is a Swiss heritage site of national significance.

== See also ==
- List of castles in Switzerland
- Château
