= Vincy Castle =

Castle in Gilly, Switzerland

- Château de Vincy
- Gilly in Switzerland
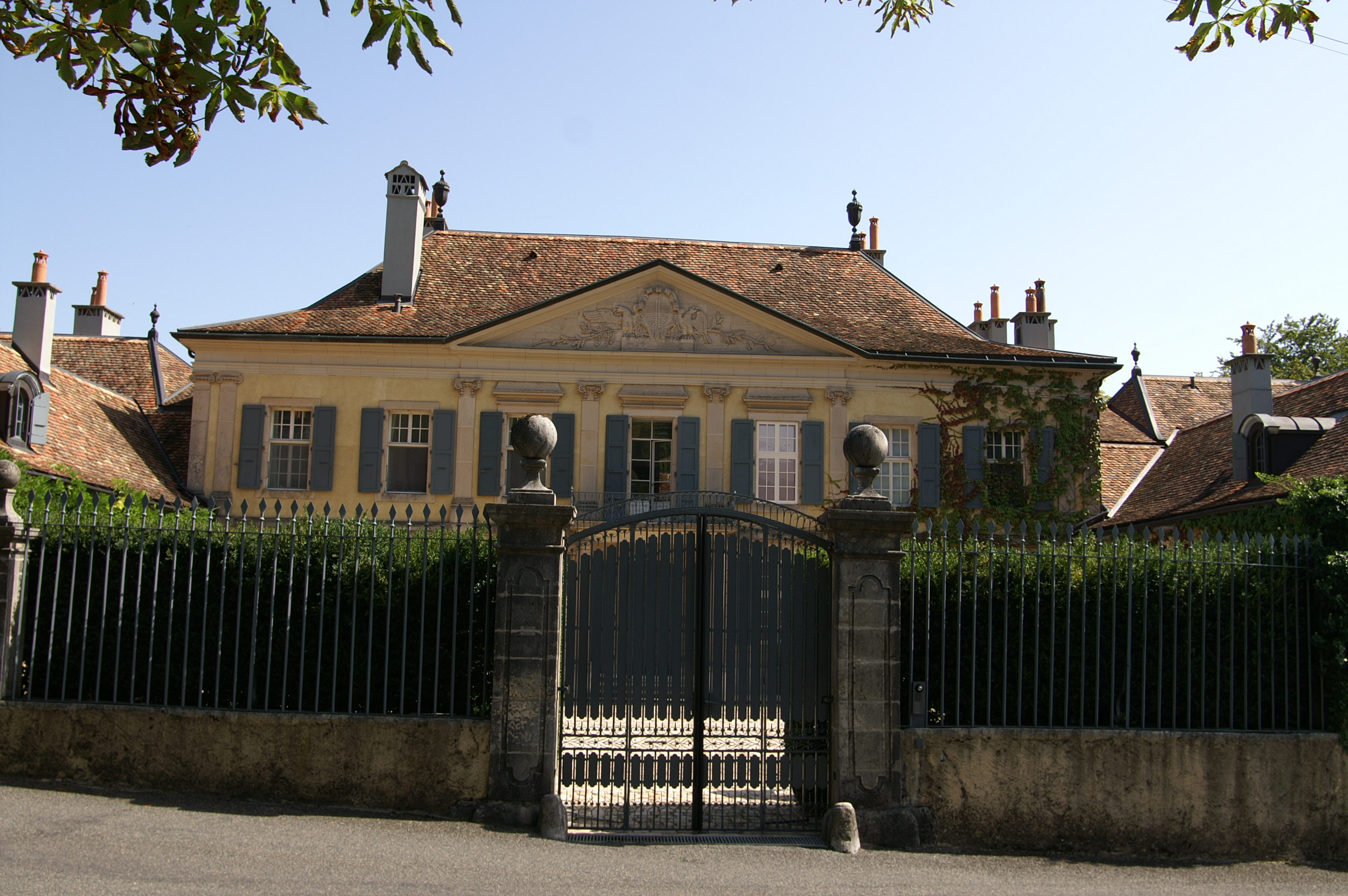
- Vincy Castle

Location
- Coordinates: 46°27′43″N 6°18′04″E

Site history
- Built: 1721

Garrison information
- Occupants: Jean and David de Vasserot

Swiss Cultural Property of National Significance

Vincy Castle is a castle in the municipality of Gilly of the Canton of Vaud in Switzerland. It is a Swiss heritage site of national significance.

== See also ==
- List of castles in Switzerland
- Château
