= Orbe Castle =

Castle in Orbe, Switzerland

- Château d'Orbe
- Orbe in Switzerland
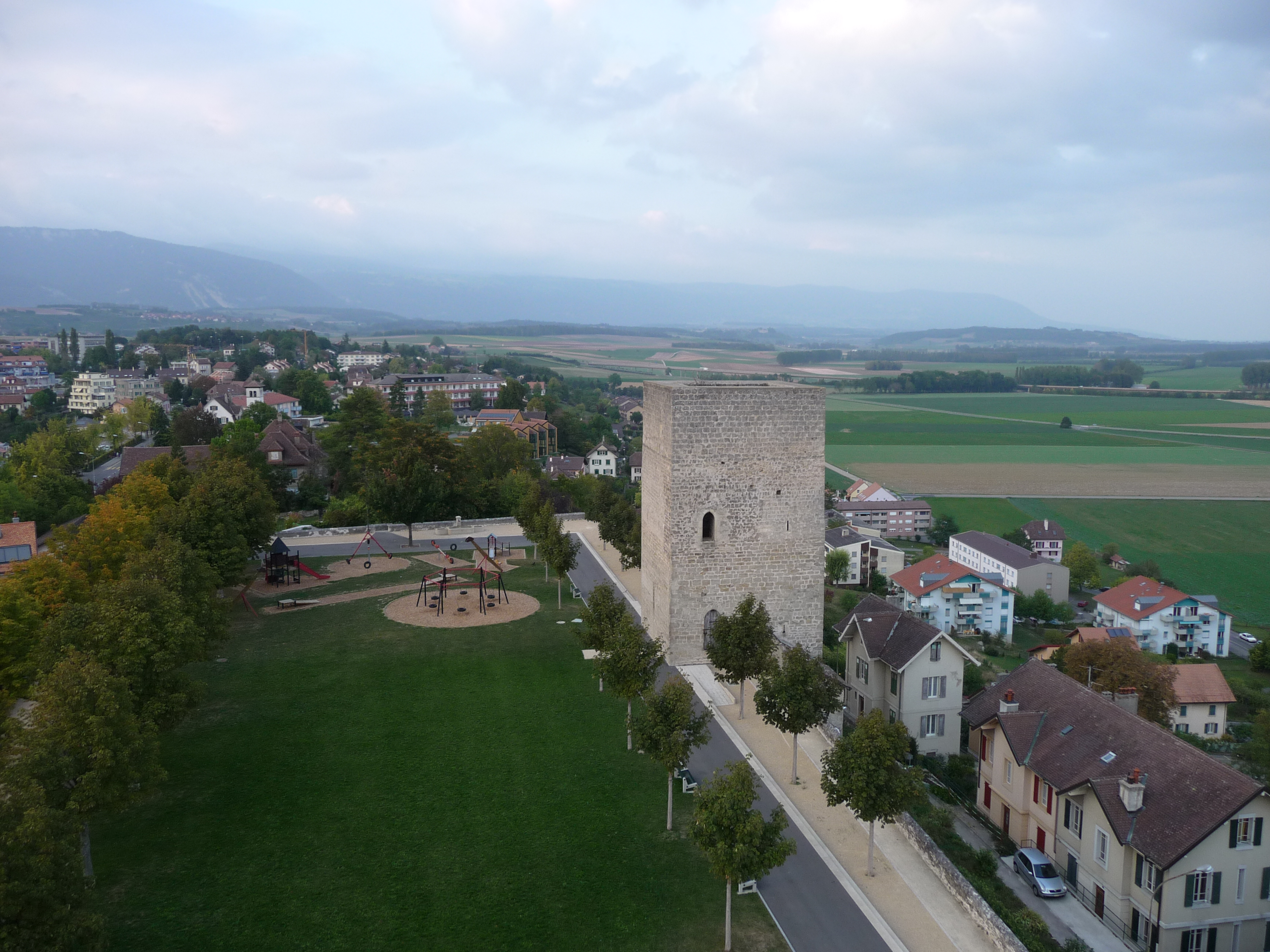
- The esplanade and dungeon seen from the round tower

Location
- Coordinates: 46°43′27″N 6°31′54″E

Swiss Cultural Property of National Significance

Orbe Castle is a castle in the municipality of Orbe of the Canton of Vaud in Switzerland. It is a Swiss heritage site of national significance.

== See also ==
- List of castles in Switzerland
- Château
