= Moudon Castle =

Castle in Vaud, Switzerland

Coordinates: 46°40′11″N 6°47′44″E

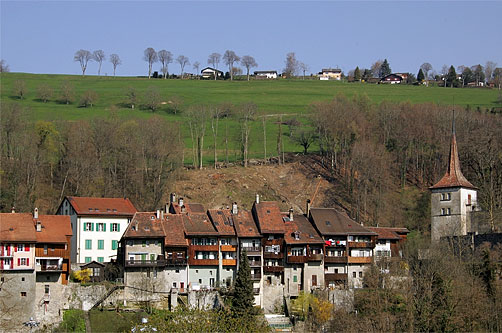
Moudon Castle

Moudon Castle is a castle in the municipality of Moudon of the Canton of Vaud in Switzerland. It is a Swiss heritage site of national significance.

== See also ==
- List of castles in Switzerland
- Château
