= Blonay Castle =

Castle in Blonay, Switzerland

- Schloss Blonay
- Blonay
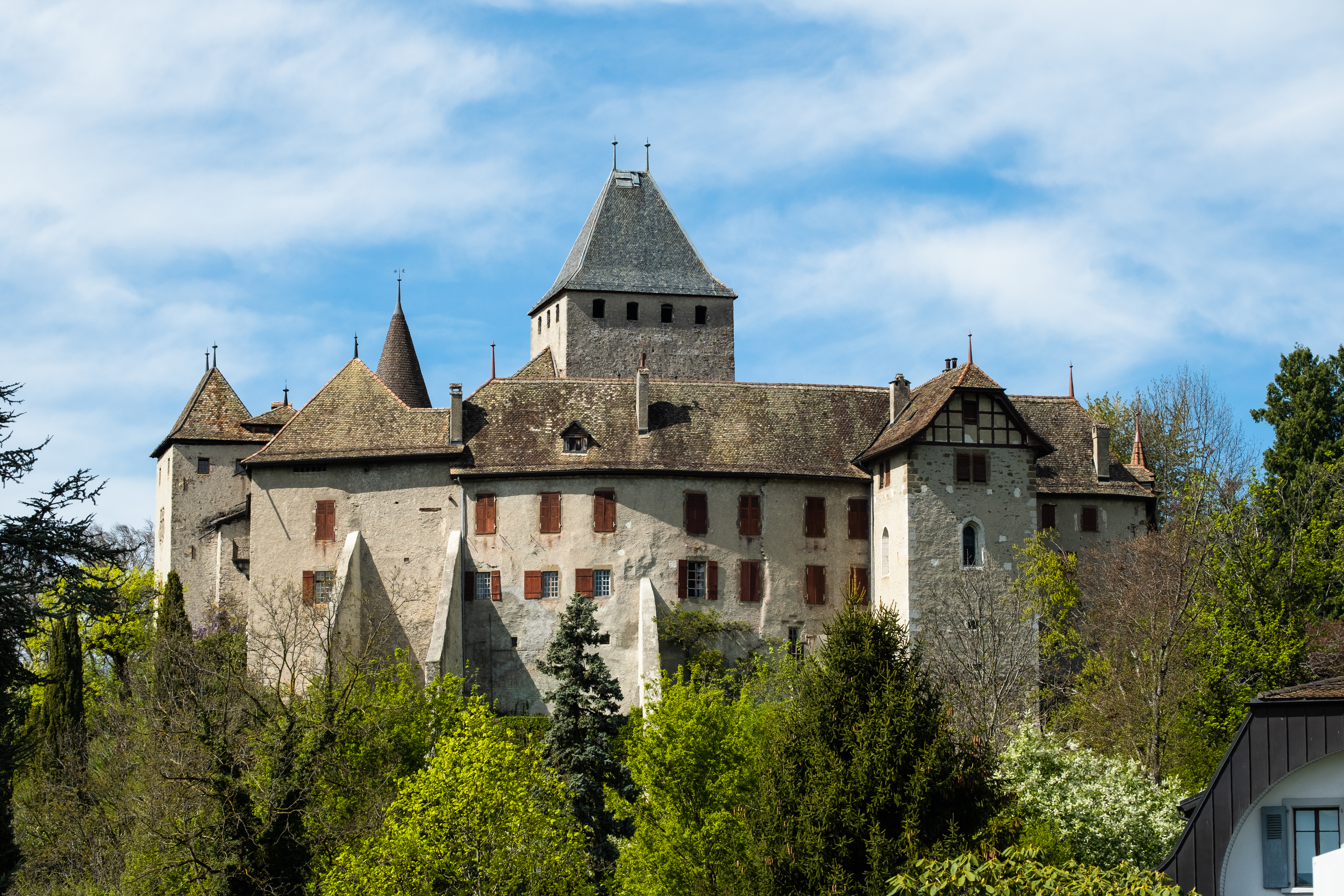
- Blonay Castle

Site information
- Code: CH-VD
- Condition: preserved

Location
- Coordinates: 46°28′10″N 6°53′24″E
- Height: 644 m above the sea

Site history
- Built: 1175

Swiss Cultural Property of National Significance

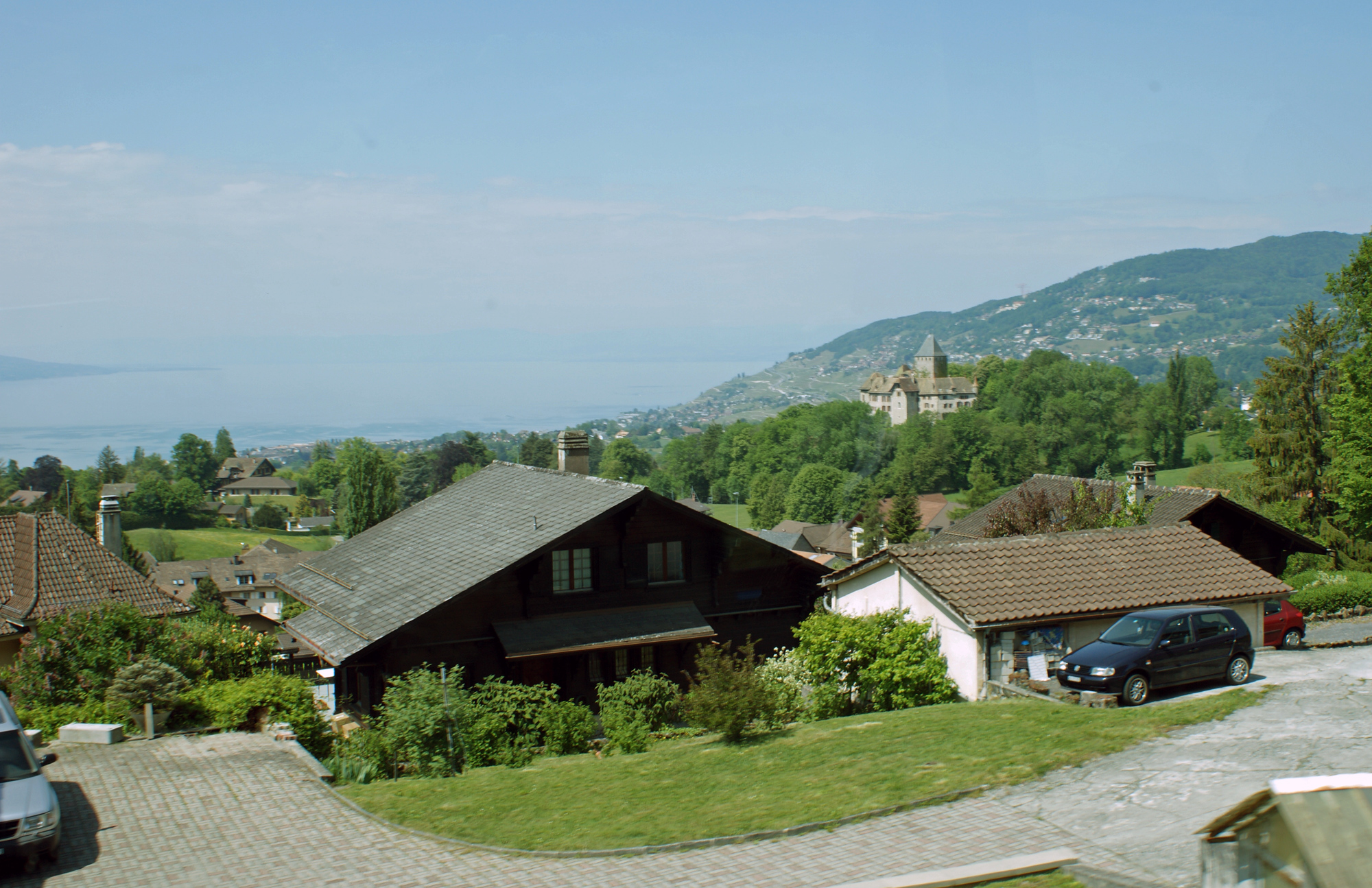
Blonay town with Blonay Castle in the background

Blonay Castle is a castle in the municipality of Blonay of the Canton of Vaud in Switzerland. It is a Swiss heritage site of national significance.

== History ==
The castle was built in 1175, by William II of Blonay (died 1197), a ministerialis in Savoy, on the site of a fortified structure that dated from 1095. It has served as the Blonay family seat since that time, aside from a brief interruption in the 18th century.

The oldest remaining portion of the structure is the sturdy, square castle keep, which has been strengthened, and seen a row of buildings attached to create another courtyard. Only two of four towers remain, around an irregular rectangular plan. There is a forecourt with a Renaissance-style loggia, from 1677 on the western edge, and a chapel dating from the 15th century, with stained glass windows from 1577. Residential quarters built between the 18th and 20th centuries have undergone renovations and alterations. By the 19th century, a moat had been filled in.

Gustave Courbet created a painting of the castle in about 1875, during the artist's self-imposed exile from France, living in neighboring La Tour-de-Peilz.

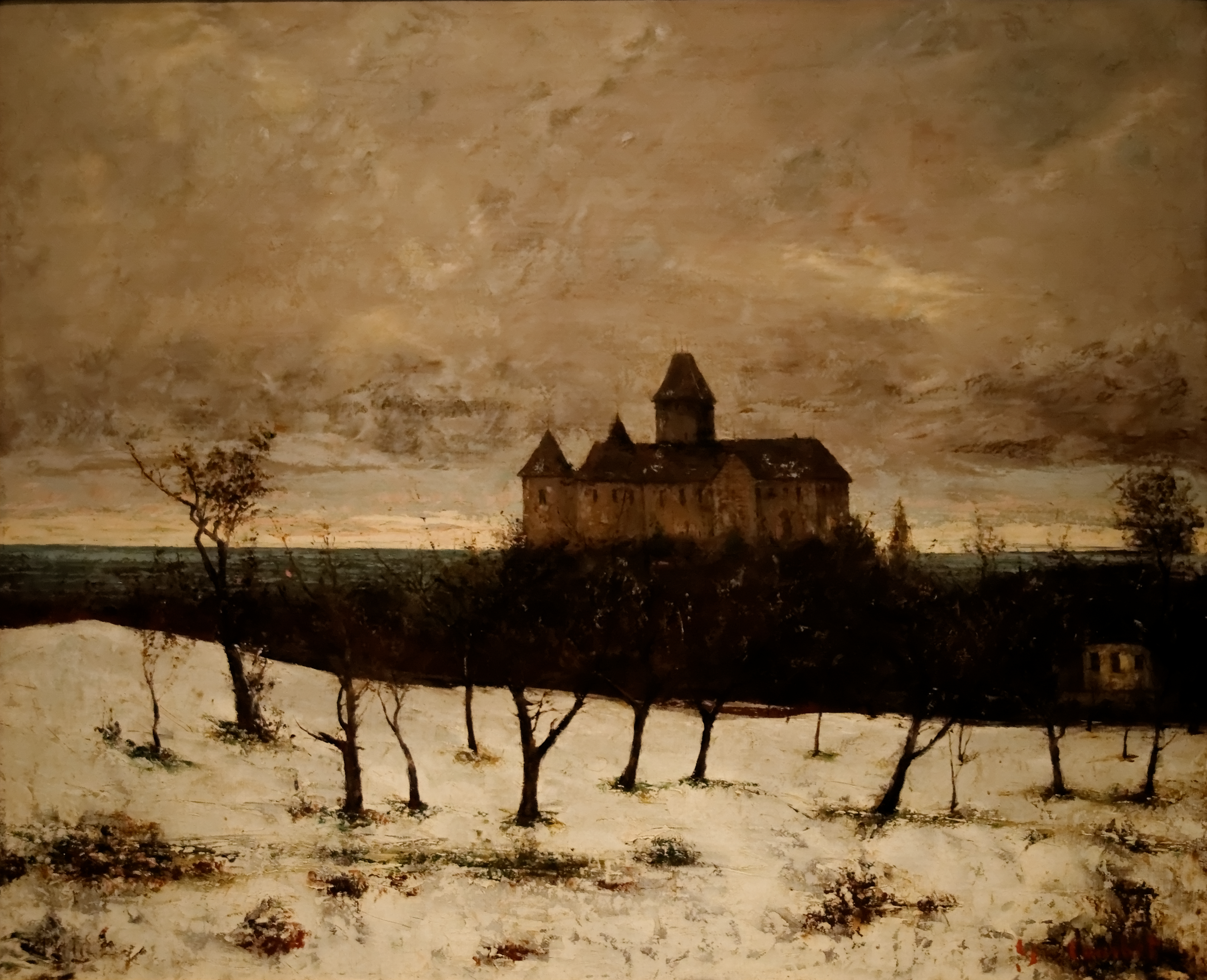
The Chateau of Blonay (snow) by Gustave Courbet, ca. 1875. Museum of Fine Arts, Budapest.

== See also ==
- List of castles in Switzerland
- Château
