= La Sarraz Castle =

Castle in La Sarraz, Switzerland

- La Sarraz in Switzerland
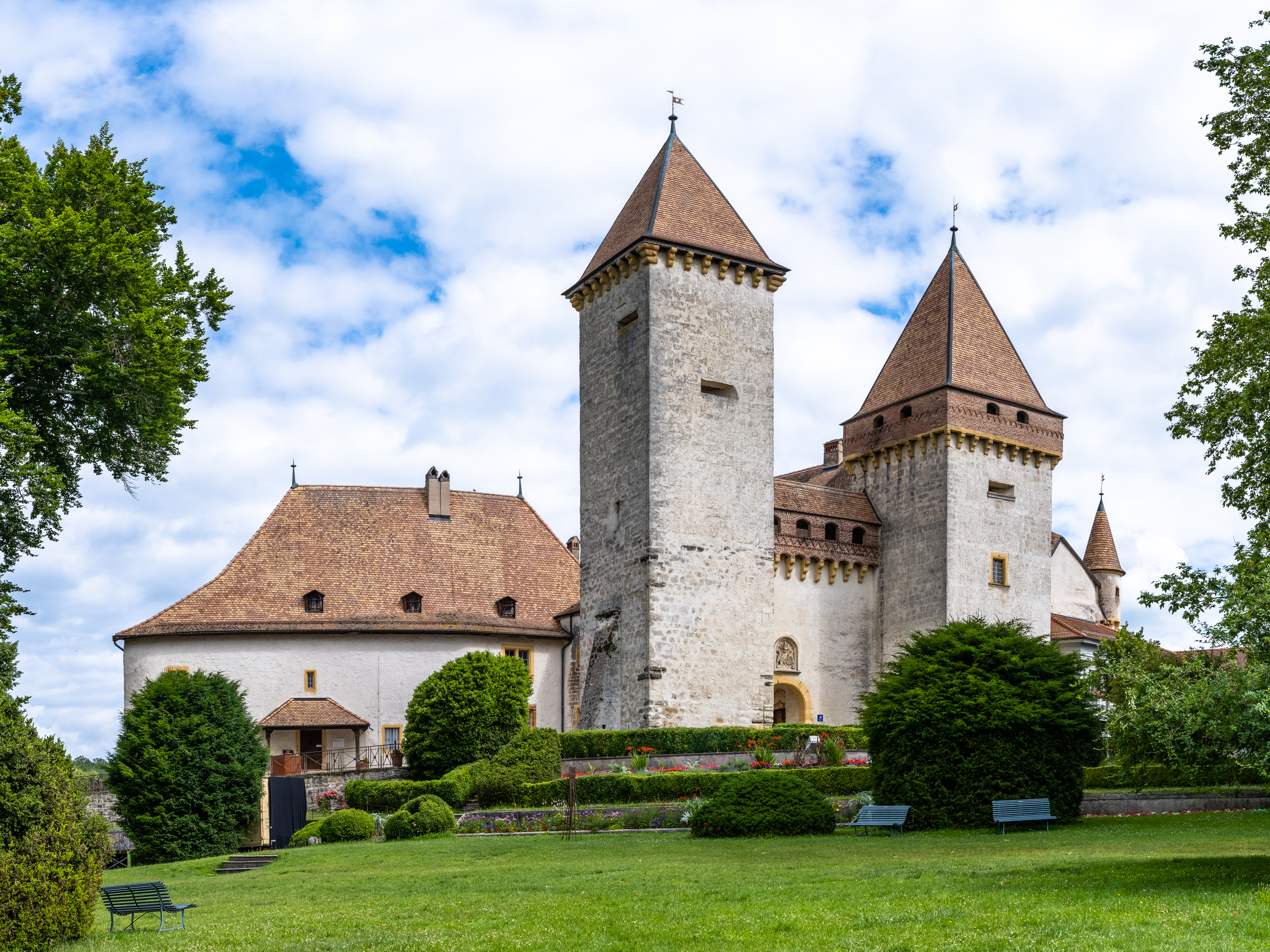

Site information
- Type: Castle
- Owner: Fondation du Château de La Sarraz
- Website: chateau-lasarraz.ch

Location
- Coordinates: 46°39′37″N 6°30′51″E

Site history
- Built: 11th century

Garrison information
- Occupants: La Sarraz family

Swiss Cultural Property of National Significance

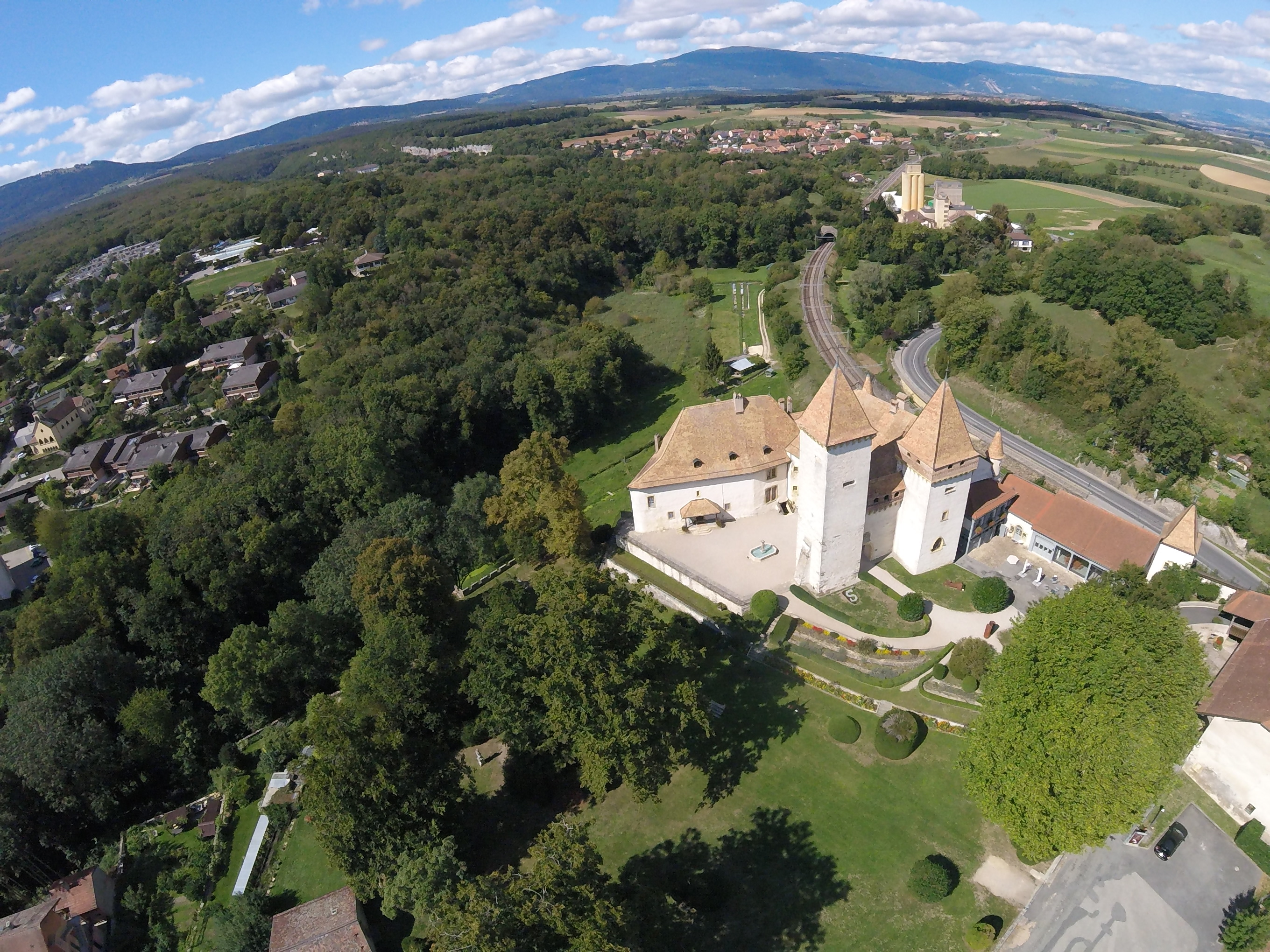
La Sarraz Castle, aerial photo

La Sarraz Castle is a castle in the municipality of La Sarraz of the Canton of Vaud in Switzerland. It is a Swiss heritage site of national significance.

== See also ==
- List of castles in Switzerland
- Château
