= Grandcour Castle =

Castle in Grandcour, Switzerland

- Grandcour in Switzerland
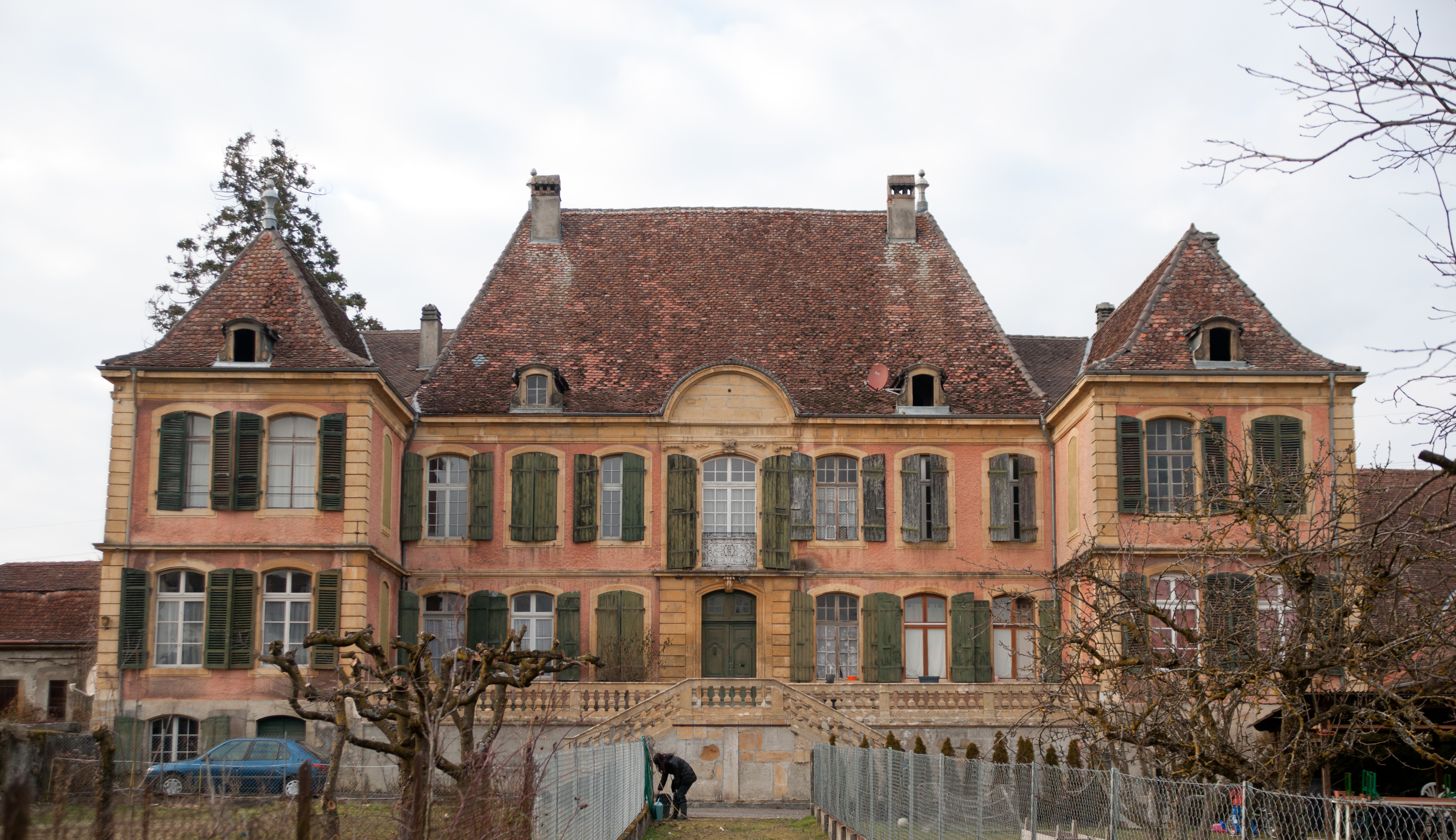
- Exterior of the castle

Site information
- Type: Château

Location
- Coordinates: 46°52′25″N 6°55′48″E

Garrison information
- Occupants: Abraham de Sinner

Swiss Cultural Property of National Significance

Grandcour Castle is a castle in the municipality of Grandcour of the Canton of Vaud in Switzerland. It is a Swiss heritage site of national significance.

== See also ==
- List of castles in Switzerland
- Château
