= Nyon Castle =

Castle in Nyon, Switzerland

- Château de Nyon
- Nyon in Switzerland
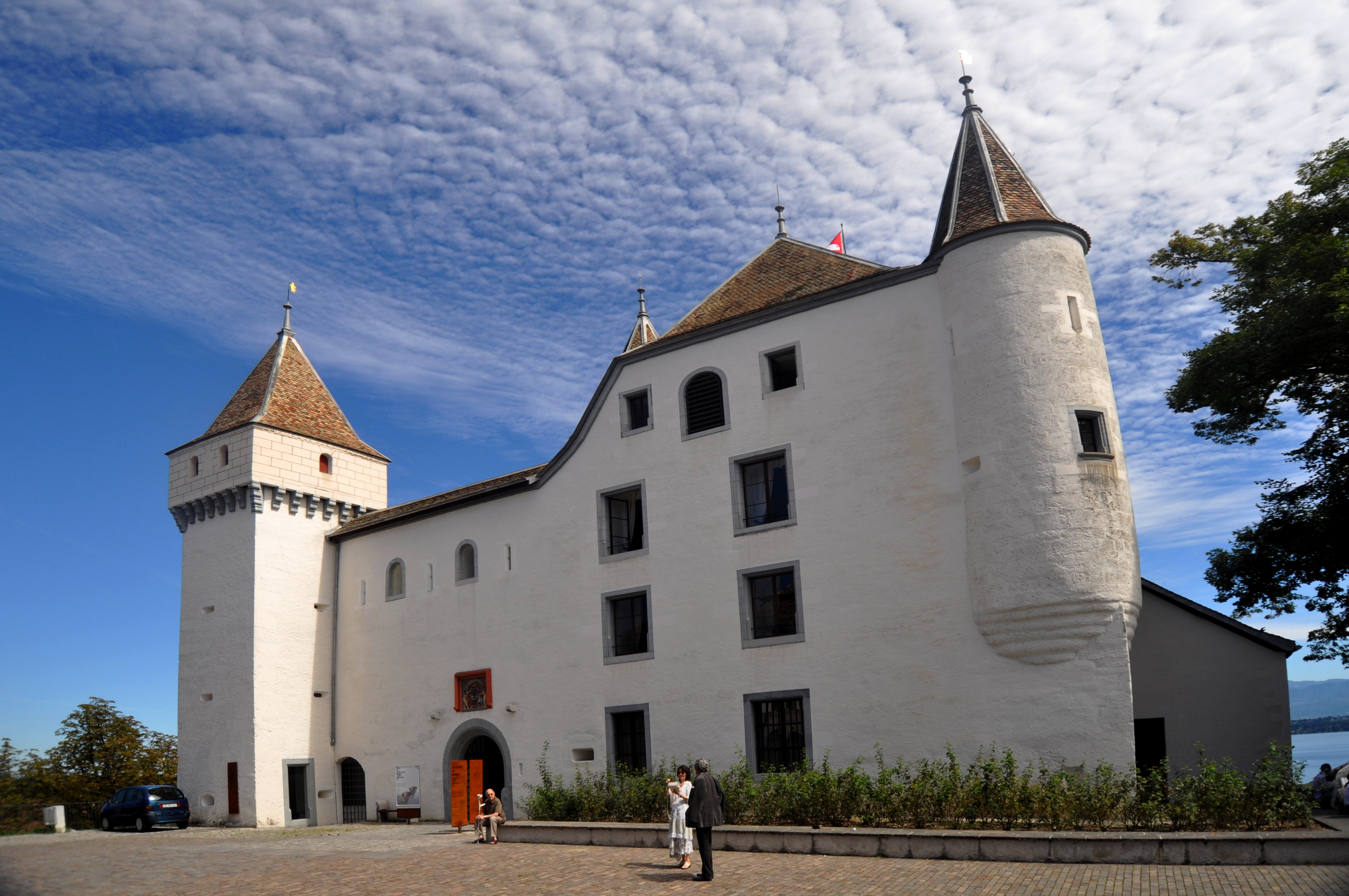
- Exterior of the castle

Location
- Coordinates: 46°22′56″N 6°14′26″E

Site history
- Built: 13th century

Swiss Cultural Property of National Significance

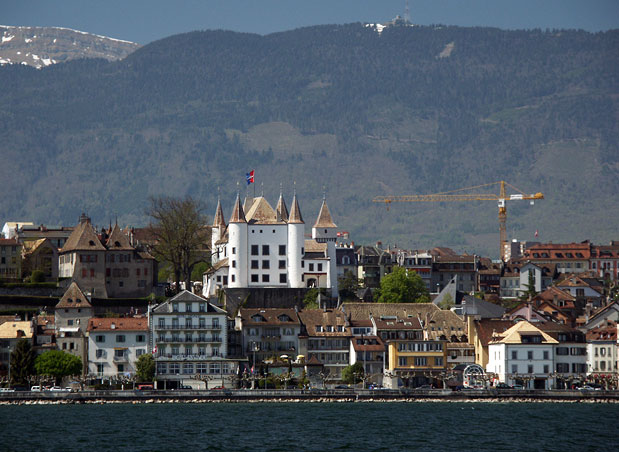
Nyon Castle in Nyon

Nyon Castle video

Nyon Castle is a castle in the municipality of Nyon of the Canton of Vaud in Switzerland. It is a Swiss heritage site of national significance.

== See also ==
- List of castles in Switzerland
- Château
