= Evangelical Reformed Church of the Canton of Vaud =

The Evangelical Reformed Church of the Canton of Vaud (or in French the Église évangélique réformée du canton de Vaud) is a Reformed cantonal state church in Vaud.

== History ==
The church was founded by Guillaume Farel and Pierre Viret. In that time the land was under the rule of the princes in Savoy. After the occupation of Vaud in 1536 by the Canton of Bern the Reformed faith was predominate. Vaud was under the protectorate of Bern till 1803. In 1847 a split occurred in the church. Alexandre Vinet and Charles Monnard founded the Église libre (the Free Church).

In 1863 the National Reformed State Church was founded.

In 1966 the Free Church and National Church united to form the current Reformed State Church.

The church professes the Reformed Confessions and share the heritage of the Swiss Reformers in the 16th century, especially John Calvin.

The church is a member of the Federation of Swiss Protestant Churches.

== Beliefs ==
=== Marriage ===
In 2022, the church adopted an inclusive vision and celebrates both opposite-sex marriages and same-sex marriages.

== Statistics ==
In 2004, the church had 481,551 members and 158 congregations, served by 158 pastors.

Congregations are in Aigle, Balcon du Jura, Ballaigues, Baulmes, Begnins, Bellevaux, Belmont, Blonay, Broyetal, Chailly, Chardonne, Chavannes-près-Renens, Chavornay, Cheseaux, Clarens, Coeur de la Cote, Columbier, Colombier, Corsier-Corseaux, Cossonay-Grancy, Crissier, Curtilles-Lucens, Echallens, Ecublens-Saint-Sulpice, Genolier, Gimel—Longirod, Gland, Grandson, Barns, Upper Menthue, Jorat, The Dole, The Arnon, Sallaz-The Croisettes, Sarraz, La Tour-de-Peilz, Les Avancons, La Vallée The Aubonne Valley, Upper Talent, Le Mont-sur-Lausanne, Lonay Préverenges Vuillerens, Montagny-Champvent, Mont Aubert, Montreux-Veytaux, Morges Echichens, Morges-La Côte-Nyon (Congregation), Moudon-Syens, Nyon, and Ollon-Villars.

Ordination of women is allowed. Blessing of same-sex unions is allowed.
