= La Côte =

Coast in Switzerland

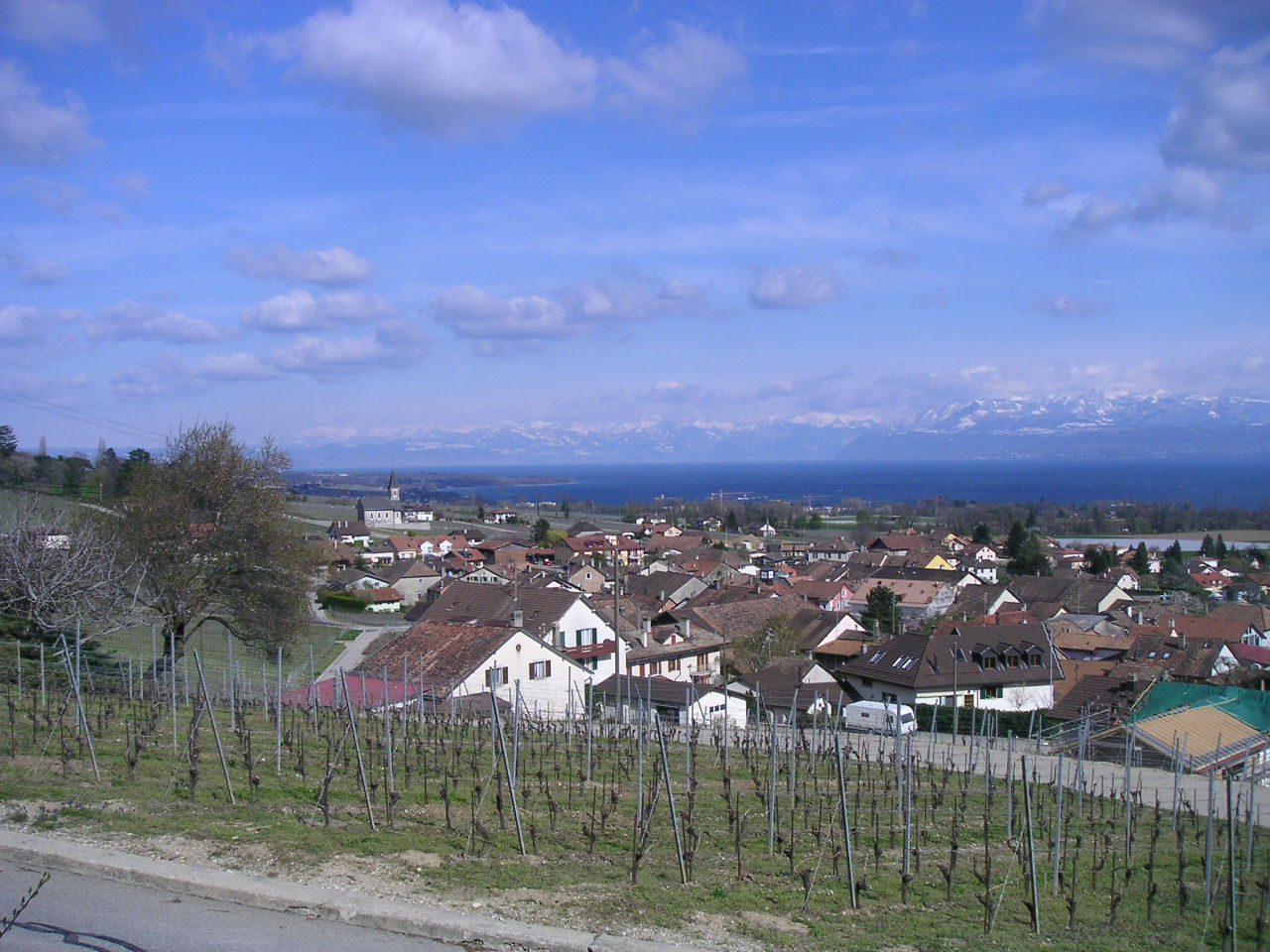
La Côte

La Côte (French pronunciation: [la kot], lit. 'The Slope') is part of the sloping Lake Geneva (French: Lac Léman) north shore, stretching from Nyon to Lausanne in the canton of Vaud in Switzerland.

Known for its vineyards, the area has views towards the high Alps across the lake.

== Communes ==
- Mies
- Coppet
- Founex
- Prangins
- Gland
- Gilly
- Luins
- Vinzel
- Bursins
- Tartegnin
- Rolle
- Mont-sur-Rolle
- Bougy-Villars
- Perroy
- Allaman
- Aubonne
- Etoy
- Saint-Prex
- Morges
- Préverenges
- Saint-Sulpice

== See also ==
- La Côte Airport
