= Rolle Castle =

Castle in Rolle, Switzerland

- Château de Rolle
- Rolle in Switzerland
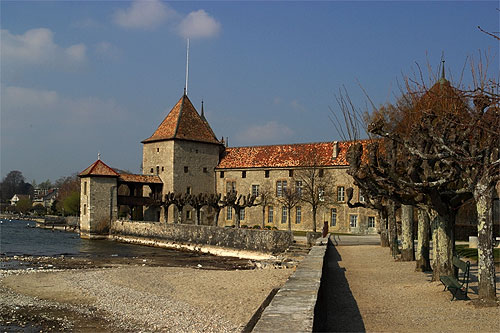
- Rolle Castle

Site information
- Owner: Rolle municipality

Location
- Coordinates: 46°27′31″N 6°20′28″E

Site history
- Built by: Château fort

Swiss Cultural Property of National Significance

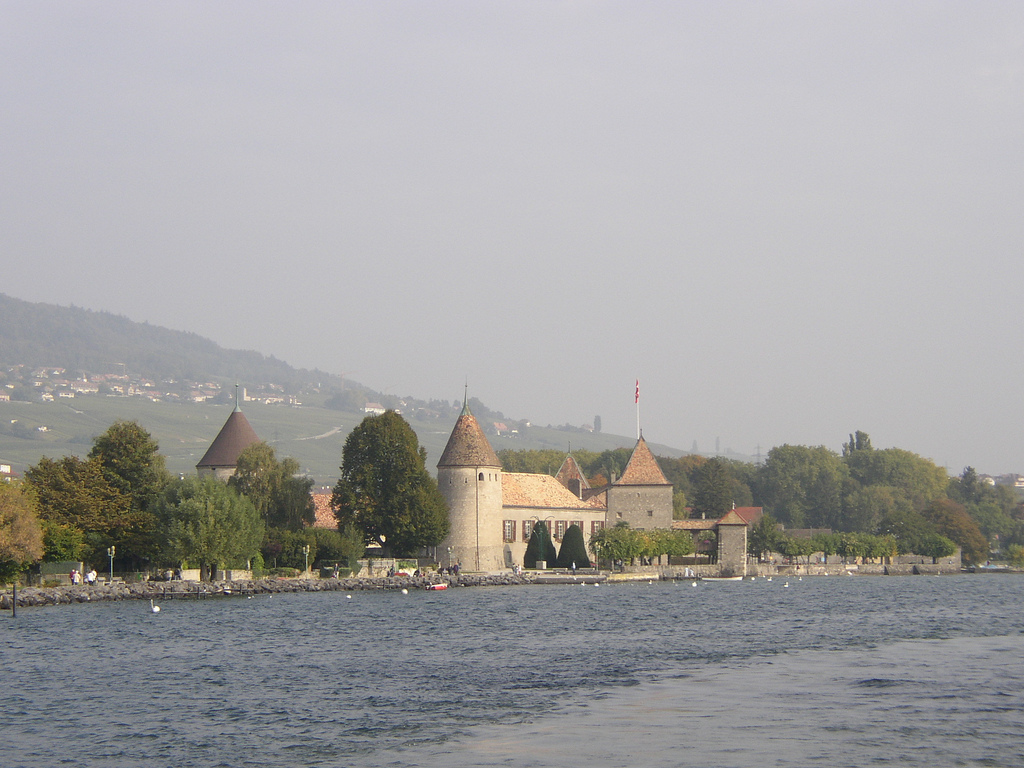
Rolle Castle from Lake Geneva

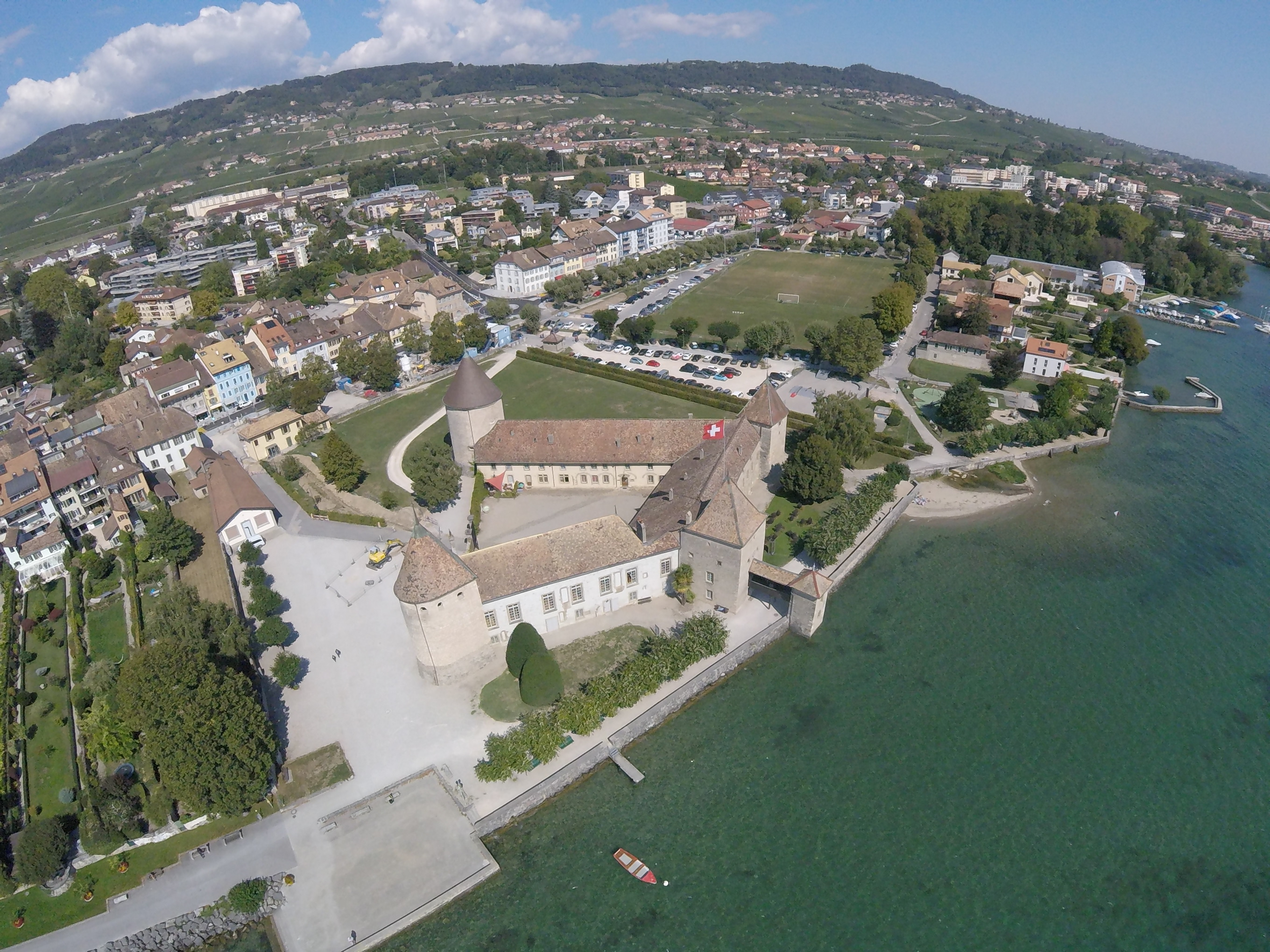
Rolle Castle, aerial view

Rolle Castle is a castle in the municipality of Rolle of the Canton of Vaud in Switzerland. It is a Swiss heritage site of national significance.

== History ==
In 1261, the Lords of Mont planned to build a city along the lake that would compete with the Aubonne and Saint-Prex. By around 1264, Rolle Castle was built named at the time Castrum de Ruello to protect the pier at the lake named in Honor of King Rollo the 10th Century CE Viking leader. However, the planned city was never built by the Mont family. In 1291, the castle was in possession of Count Amadeus V of Savoy, who granted it to several different families as a fief. In the course of the rivalry between the Counts of Savoy and the Lords of Vaud, in 1319 Amadeus V of Savoy finally built a city around the castle, in 1330 the city was named Ruelloz. This new city closed a gap in the savoy settlements on the northern shores of Lake Geneva.

During the Bernese invasion, both Le Rosey Castle and Rolle Castle were attacked and burned.

Under Bernese rule (1536-1798) Rolle was part of the bailiwick of Morges. In 1558, the Bernese merchant Hans Steiger, who was already the lord of Mont-le-Grand, acquired the barony of Rolle. His family retained the property until the French Revolution. The barony included the town of Rolle (except the fief of Les Uttins which belonged until the 18th century to the La Harpe family), Tartegnin, Vinzel, Luins, half of Essertines-sur-Rolle, some homes in Begnins, the region of Vincy and Saint-Vincent (now in Gilly), Bursinel and in 1615 they acquired Le Rosey Castle, Dully and Le Vaud. The judicial court was composed of the lord, his deputy, a court clerk, and ten members from Rolle and villages in the district. One of ten members governed the city. In 1740 the town bought itself out from under some taxes and duties.

Following the French invasion of Switzerland in 1798, Rolle became the seat of a district of the same name. In 1799 the Helvetic Republic bought the castle from the municipality and used it until 1974 as the seat of government. In 1802, during the Bourla-papey uprising, patrician land titles and tax records were burned in the archives at Rolle Castle.

== See also ==
- List of castles in Switzerland
- Château
