= Allaman Castle =

Castle in Allaman, Switzerland

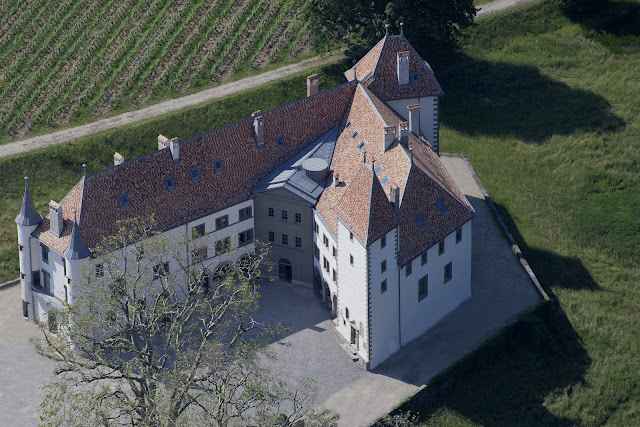

- Location within Canton of Vaud Allaman Castle (Switzerland)

General information
- Classification: Grade 1 Swiss Heritage Site
- Location: Allaman, Switzerland
- Coordinates: 46.4713°N 6.3978°E

Website
- www.Chateau-Allaman.ch

Allaman Castle (French: Château d'Allaman) is a castle in the municipality of Allaman in the canton of Vaud in Switzerland. It has its origins in the 11/12th Century but the main components were built by Louis, Duke of Savoy - Count de Vaud, in 1253. It is listed in the Swiss Inventory of Cultural Property of National and Regional Significance.

The wealthy Genevan philanthropist Count Jean-Jacques de Sellon, (son of Hortense Gallatin, the sister of Albert Gallatin) who owned the property until 1839, gave accommodation at the castle to, amongst many others, such political refugees as Napoleon's brother Joseph Bonaparte, Empress Joséphine de Beauharnais, the Duke of Bassano, the Count Camille Cavour, Voltaire as well as to Franz Liszt and George Sand.

In 1820 de Sellon founded the Society of Peace, forerunner of the League of Nations and the United Nations Organization (UNO) and in 1830 the First International Peace Summit was held in Château d'Allaman. Since then, the Castle has also been referred to as The Castle of Peace. De Sellon was also instrumental in the abolition of the death penalty in Switzerland.

The Castle of Allaman is one of the largest private properties of Switzerland. The estate covers over 330,000 square metres (33 hectares; 82 acres) and offers some 6,200 m^{2} (67,000 ft^{2}) of living space. The estate is surrounded by private forests, parks, gardens and Grand Cru vine yards. Recently completely restored and transformed, the Castle is owned by a Swiss family.

== See also ==
- List of castles and fortresses in Switzerland
