= Rolle District =

Coordinates: 46°28′N 6°20′E

Rolle District was a district of the canton of Vaud in Switzerland. The seat of the district was the city of Rolle until January 1, 2008. It is now part of Nyon District, except the town of Allaman which is now part of the Morges District.

== Mergers and name changes ==
- On 1 September 2006 the municipality of Allaman joined the Morges District.
- On 1 September 2006 the municipalities of Bursinel, Bursins, Burtigny, Dully, Essertines-sur-Rolle, Gilly, Luins, Mont-sur-Rolle, Perroy, Rolle, Tartegnin and Vinzel came from the District de Rolle to join the Nyon District.

== Places in Rolle district ==
- Allaman
- Bursinel
- Bursins
- Burtigny
- Dully
- Essertines-sur-Rolle
- Gilly
- Luins
- Mont-sur-Rolle
- Perroy
- Rolle
- Tartegnin
- Vinzel
