= Bursinel =

- Municipality
- Flag Coat of arms
- Location of Bursinel
- Location within Switzerland Location within Canton of Vaud
- Coordinates: 46°26′N 6°18′E
- Country: Switzerland
- Canton: Vaud
- District: Nyon

Government
  - Mayor: Syndic; Pierre Burnier

Area
  - Total: 1.76 km^{2} (0.68 sq mi)
- Elevation: 430 m (1,410 ft)

Population (2004)
  - Total: 359
  - Density: 204/km^{2} (528/sq mi)
- Demonym: Les Tire-vouables
- Time zone: UTC+01:00 (CET)
  - Summer (DST): UTC+02:00 (CEST)
- Postal code: 1195
- SFOS number: 5852
- ISO 3166 code: CH-VD
- Surrounded by: Gilly, Rolle, Dully, Bursins
- Website: www.bursinel.ch

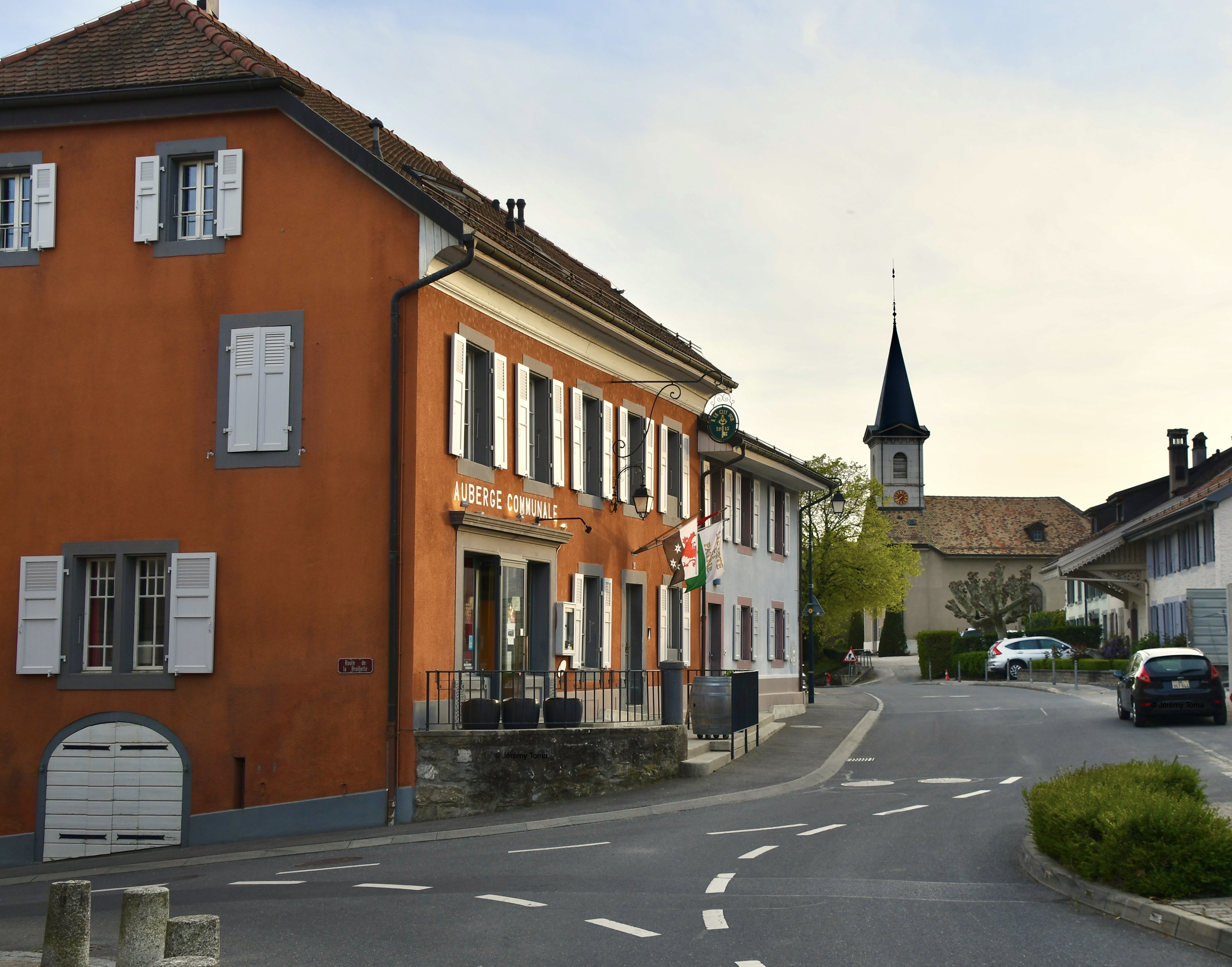
Bursinel (2020)

Bursinel is a municipality in the district of Nyon in the canton of Vaud in Switzerland.

== History ==
Bursinel is first mentioned in 1139 as Brucines.

== Geography ==
Aerial view (1964)

Bursinel has an area, as of 2009, of 1.8 square kilometers (0.69 mi^{2}). Of this area, 1.31 km^{2} (0.51 mi^{2}) or 74.0% is used for agricultural purposes, while 0.2 km^{2} (0.077 mi^{2}) or 11.3% is forested. Of the rest of the land, 0.29 km^{2} (0.11 mi^{2}) or 16.4% is settled (buildings or roads).

Of the built up area, housing and buildings made up 8.5% and transportation infrastructure made up 6.2%. while parks, green belts and sports fields made up 1.1%. Out of the forested land, 9.0% of the total land area is heavily forested and 2.3% is covered with orchards or small clusters of trees. Of the agricultural land, 41.2% is used for growing crops and 6.8% is pastures, while 26.0% is used for orchards or vine crops.

The municipality was part of the Rolle District until it was dissolved on 31 August 2006, and Bursinel became part of the new district of Nyon.

The municipality is located on a slight elevation above Lake Geneva. It consists of the linear village of Bursinel.

== Coat of arms ==
The blazon of the municipal coat of arms is Per fess, 1. Argent a semi-lion rampant Gules; 2. Sable, three mullets of six pierced Argent two and one.

== Demographics ==
Bursinel has a population (as of December 2020) of 492. As of 2008, 30.8% of the population are resident foreign nationals. Over the last 10 years (1999–2009 ) the population has changed at a rate of 46.2%. It has changed at a rate of 36.7% due to migration and at a rate of 10.7% due to births and deaths.

Most of the population (as of 2000) speaks French (281 or 82.2%), with German being second most common (23 or 6.7%) and English being third (18 or 5.3%). There are 4 people who speak Italian.

The age distribution, as of 2009, in Bursinel is; 69 children or 14.1% of the population are between 0 and 9 years old and 58 teenagers or 11.8% are between 10 and 19. Of the adult population, 45 people or 9.2% of the population are between 20 and 29 years old. 91 people or 18.5% are between 30 and 39, 73 people or 14.9% are between 40 and 49, and 70 people or 14.3% are between 50 and 59. The senior population distribution is 52 people or 10.6% of the population are between 60 and 69 years old, 19 people or 3.9% are between 70 and 79, there are 10 people or 2.0% who are between 80 and 89, and there are 4 people or 0.8% who are 90 and older.

As of 2000, there were 141 people who were single and never married in the municipality. There were 167 married individuals, 13 widows or widowers and 21 individuals who are divorced.

As of 2000, there were 138 private households in the municipality, and an average of 2.5 persons per household. There were 42 households that consist of only one person and 12 households with five or more people. Out of a total of 139 households that answered this question, 30.2% were households made up of just one person and there was 1 adult who lived with their parents. Of the rest of the households, there are 39 married couples without children, 49 married couples with children There were 5 single parents with a child or children. There were 2 households that were made up of unrelated people and 1 household that was made up of some sort of institution or another collective housing.

In 2000 there were 46 single family homes (or 54.8% of the total) out of a total of 84 inhabited buildings. There were 21 multi-family buildings (25.0%), along with 13 multi-purpose buildings that were mostly used for housing (15.5%) and 4 other use buildings (commercial or industrial) that also had some housing (4.8%).

In 2000, a total of 131 apartments (78.9% of the total) were permanently occupied, while 31 apartments (18.7%) were seasonally occupied and 4 apartments (2.4%) were empty. As of 2009, the construction rate of new housing units was 0 new units per 1000 residents. The vacancy rate for the municipality, in 2010, was 0%.

The historical population is given in the following chart:

== Heritage sites of national significance ==
The Villa Choisy and its outbuildings are listed as a Swiss heritage site of national significance.

== Politics ==
In the 2007 federal election the most popular party was the SVP which received 21.5% of the vote. The next three most popular parties were the SP (16.21%), the LPS Party (14.9%) and the Green Party (13.88%). In the federal election, a total of 100 votes were cast, and the voter turnout was 39.8%.

== Economy ==
As of 2010, Bursinel had an unemployment rate of 2.7%. As of 2008, there were 47 people employed in the primary economic sector and about 8 businesses involved in this sector. 3 people were employed in the secondary sector and there was 1 business in this sector. 28 people were employed in the tertiary sector, with 7 businesses in this sector. There were 181 residents of the municipality who were employed in some capacity, of which females made up 42.5% of the workforce.

In 2008 the total number of full-time equivalent jobs was 53. The number of jobs in the primary sector was 27, all of which were in agriculture. The number of jobs in the secondary sector was 3, all of which were in manufacturing. The number of jobs in the tertiary sector was 23. In the tertiary sector; 5 or 21.7% were in wholesale or retail sales or the repair of motor vehicles, 11 or 47.8% were in a hotel or restaurant, 1 was in the information industry, 4 or 17.4% were in education.

In 2000, there were 39 workers who commuted into the municipality and 144 workers who commuted away. The municipality is a net exporter of workers, with about 3.7 workers leaving the municipality for every one entering. About 15.4% of the workforce coming into Bursinel are coming from outside Switzerland. Of the working population, 13.8% used public transportation to get to work, and 66.9% used a private car.

== Religion ==
From the 2000 census, 97 or 28.4% were Roman Catholic, while 159 or 46.5% belonged to the Swiss Reformed Church. Of the rest of the population, there was 1 member of an Orthodox church, and there were 29 individuals (or about 8.48% of the population) who belonged to another Christian church. There were 3 individuals (or about 0.88% of the population) who were Jewish, and 4 (or about 1.17% of the population) who were Islamic. There was 1 person who was Buddhist. 45 (or about 13.16% of the population) belonged to no church, are agnostic or atheist, and 15 individuals (or about 4.39% of the population) did not answer the question.

== Education ==
In Bursinel about 104 or (30.4%) of the population have completed non-mandatory upper secondary education, and 67 or (19.6%) have completed additional higher education (either university or a Fachhochschule). Of the 67 who completed tertiary schooling, 44.8% were Swiss men, 28.4% were Swiss women, 16.4% were non-Swiss men and 10.4% were non-Swiss women.

In the 2009/2010 school year there were a total of 49 students in the Bursinel school district. In the Vaud cantonal school system, two years of non-obligatory pre-school are provided by the political districts. During the school year, the political district provided pre-school care for a total of 1,249 children of which 563 children (45.1%) received subsidized pre-school care. The canton's primary school program requires students to attend for four years. There were 26 students in the municipal primary school program. The obligatory lower secondary school program lasts for six years and there were 23 students in those schools.

As of 2000, there were 58 students from Bursinel who attended schools outside the municipality.
