= Perroy =

- Municipality
- Flag Coat of arms
- Location of Perroy
- Location within Switzerland Location within Canton of Vaud
- Coordinates: 46°28′N 06°22′E
- Country: Switzerland
- Canton: Vaud
- District: Nyon

Government
  - Mayor: Syndic; Charles Muller

Area
  - Total: 2.89 km^{2} (1.12 sq mi)
- Elevation: 418 m (1,371 ft)

Population (2004)
  - Total: 1,220
  - Density: 422/km^{2} (1,090/sq mi)
- Demonym(s): Les Perrolans; Lè Bourla-satset
- Time zone: UTC+01:00 (CET)
  - Summer (DST): UTC+02:00 (CEST)
- Postal code: 1166
- SFOS number: 5860
- ISO 3166 code: CH-VD
- Surrounded by: Bougy-Villars, Féchy, Allaman, Rolle, Mont-sur-Rolle
- Twin towns: Zofingen (Switzerland), Châteauneuf-de-Gadagne (France)
- Website: www.perroy.ch

Perroy (French pronunciation: [pɛʁwa]) is a municipality in the district of Nyon in the canton of Vaud in Switzerland.

== History ==
Aerial view (1959)

Perroy is may have been first mentioned in 910 as Prihoiam though that identification is disputed. In 1172 it was mentioned as Perrueis.

== Geography ==
Perroy has an area, as of 2009, of 2.9 square kilometers (1.1 mi^{2}). Of this area, 1.8 km^{2} (0.69 mi^{2}) or 62.1% is used for agricultural purposes, while 0.17 km^{2} (0.066 mi^{2}) or 5.9% is forested. Of the rest of the land, 0.89 km^{2} (0.34 mi^{2}) or 30.7% is settled (buildings or roads).

Of the built up area, industrial buildings made up 1.4% of the total area while housing and buildings made up 14.8% and transportation infrastructure made up 10.7%. while parks, green belts and sports fields made up 2.8%. Out of the forested land, 4.1% of the total land area is heavily forested and 1.7% is covered with orchards or small clusters of trees. Of the agricultural land, 12.1% is used for growing crops and 2.8% is pastures, while 47.2% is used for orchards or vine crops.

The municipality was part of the Rolle District until it was dissolved on 31 August 2006, and Perroy became part of the new district of Nyon.

The municipality is located high above the banks of Lake Geneva.

== Coat of arms ==
The blazon of the municipal coat of arms is Azure, a Grape-bunch Or.

== Demographics ==
Perroy has a population (as of December 2020) of 1,518. As of 2008, 26.8% of the population are resident foreign nationals. Over the last 10 years (1999–2009 ) the population has changed at a rate of 17%. It has changed at a rate of 10.5% due to migration and at a rate of 7.3% due to births and deaths.

Most of the population (as of 2000) speaks French (918 or 83.2%), with German being second most common (63 or 5.7%) and Portuguese being third (49 or 4.4%). There are 18 people who speak Italian and 1 person who speaks Romansh.

The age distribution, as of 2009, in Perroy is; 172 children or 13.0% of the population are between 0 and 9 years old and 149 teenagers or 11.3% are between 10 and 19. Of the adult population, 146 people or 11.1% of the population are between 20 and 29 years old. 204 people or 15.5% are between 30 and 39, 221 people or 16.7% are between 40 and 49, and 168 people or 12.7% are between 50 and 59. The senior population distribution is 175 people or 13.3% of the population are between 60 and 69 years old, 43 people or 3.3% are between 70 and 79, there are 34 people or 2.6% who are between 80 and 89, and there are 8 people or 0.6% who are 90 and older.

As of 2000, there were 419 people who were single and never married in the municipality. There were 571 married individuals, 46 widows or widowers and 68 individuals who are divorced.

As of 2000, there were 479 private households in the municipality, and an average of 2.3 persons per household. There were 160 households that consist of only one person and 28 households with five or more people. Out of a total of 492 households that answered this question, 32.5% were households made up of just one person and there were 4 adults who lived with their parents. Of the rest of the households, there are 152 married couples without children, 144 married couples with children There were 14 single parents with a child or children. There were 5 households that were made up of unrelated people and 13 households that were made up of some sort of institution or another collective housing.

In 2000 there were 160 single family homes (or 59.9% of the total) out of a total of 267 inhabited buildings. There were 60 multi-family buildings (22.5%), along with 34 multi-purpose buildings that were mostly used for housing (12.7%) and 13 other use buildings (commercial or industrial) that also had some housing (4.9%).

In 2000, a total of 461 apartments (85.5% of the total) were permanently occupied, while 65 apartments (12.1%) were seasonally occupied and 13 apartments (2.4%) were empty. As of 2009, the construction rate of new housing units was 2.3 new units per 1000 residents. The vacancy rate for the municipality, in 2010, was 0%.

The historical population is given in the following chart:

== Sights ==
The entire village of Perroy is designated as part of the Inventory of Swiss Heritage Sites.

== International relations ==
=== Twin towns – Sister cities ===
Perroy is twinned with:

- Châteauneuf-de-Gadagne, France.

== Politics ==
In the 2007 federal election the most popular party was the SVP which received 27.84% of the vote. The next three most popular parties were the FDP (18.1%), the SP (14.98%) and the LPS Party (13.56%). In the federal election, a total of 360 votes were cast, and the voter turnout was 42.7%.

== Economy ==
As of 2010, Perroy had an unemployment rate of 4%. As of 2008, there were 80 people employed in the primary economic sector and about 13 businesses involved in this sector. 107 people were employed in the secondary sector and there were 11 businesses in this sector. 172 people were employed in the tertiary sector, with 28 businesses in this sector. There were 628 residents of the municipality who were employed in some capacity, of which females made up 42.8% of the workforce.

In 2008 the total number of full-time equivalent jobs was 290. The number of jobs in the primary sector was 46, of which 42 were in agriculture and 4 were in fishing or fisheries. The number of jobs in the secondary sector was 105 of which 13 or (12.4%) were in manufacturing and 90 (85.7%) were in construction. The number of jobs in the tertiary sector was 139. In the tertiary sector; 83 or 59.7% were in wholesale or retail sales or the repair of motor vehicles, 5 or 3.6% were in the movement and storage of goods, 12 or 8.6% were in a hotel or restaurant, 1 was the insurance or financial industry, 10 or 7.2% were technical professionals or scientists, 4 or 2.9% were in education.

In 2000, there were 108 workers who commuted into the municipality and 483 workers who commuted away. The municipality is a net exporter of workers, with about 4.5 workers leaving the municipality for every one entering. Of the working population, 13.9% used public transportation to get to work, and 64.8% used a private car.

== Religion ==
From the 2000 census, 305 or 27.6% were Roman Catholic, while 502 or 45.5% belonged to the Swiss Reformed Church. Of the rest of the population, there were 7 members of an Orthodox church (or about 0.63% of the population), and there were 58 individuals (or about 5.25% of the population) who belonged to another Christian church. There were 2 individuals (or about 0.18% of the population) who were Jewish, and 28 (or about 2.54% of the population) who were Islamic. There was 1 person who was Hindu and 1 individual who belonged to another church. 173 (or about 15.67% of the population) belonged to no church, are agnostic or atheist, and 53 individuals (or about 4.80% of the population) did not answer the question.

== Education ==
In Perroy about 372 or (33.7%) of the population have completed non-mandatory upper secondary education, and 223 or (20.2%) have completed additional higher education (either university or a Fachhochschule). Of the 223 who completed tertiary schooling, 48.9% were Swiss men, 27.4% were Swiss women, 13.5% were non-Swiss men and 10.3% were non-Swiss women.

In the 2009/2010 school year there were a total of 151 students in the Perroy school district. In the Vaud cantonal school system, two years of non-obligatory pre-school are provided by the political districts. During the school year, the political district provided pre-school care for a total of 1,249 children of which 563 children (45.1%) received subsidized pre-school care. The canton's primary school program requires students to attend for four years. There were 82 students in the municipal primary school program. The obligatory lower secondary school program lasts for six years and there were 63 students in those schools. There were also 6 students who were home schooled or attended another non-traditional school.

As of 2000, there were 91 students from Perroy who attended schools outside the municipality.

== Notable residents ==
Residence (Les Rouges) of the artist Rene Emile Julien Martin (1920/1946) and the sculptor Milo Martin (1920/1928). Official residence of the Heineken heiress Charlene de Carvalho-Heineken
