= Bursins =

- Municipality
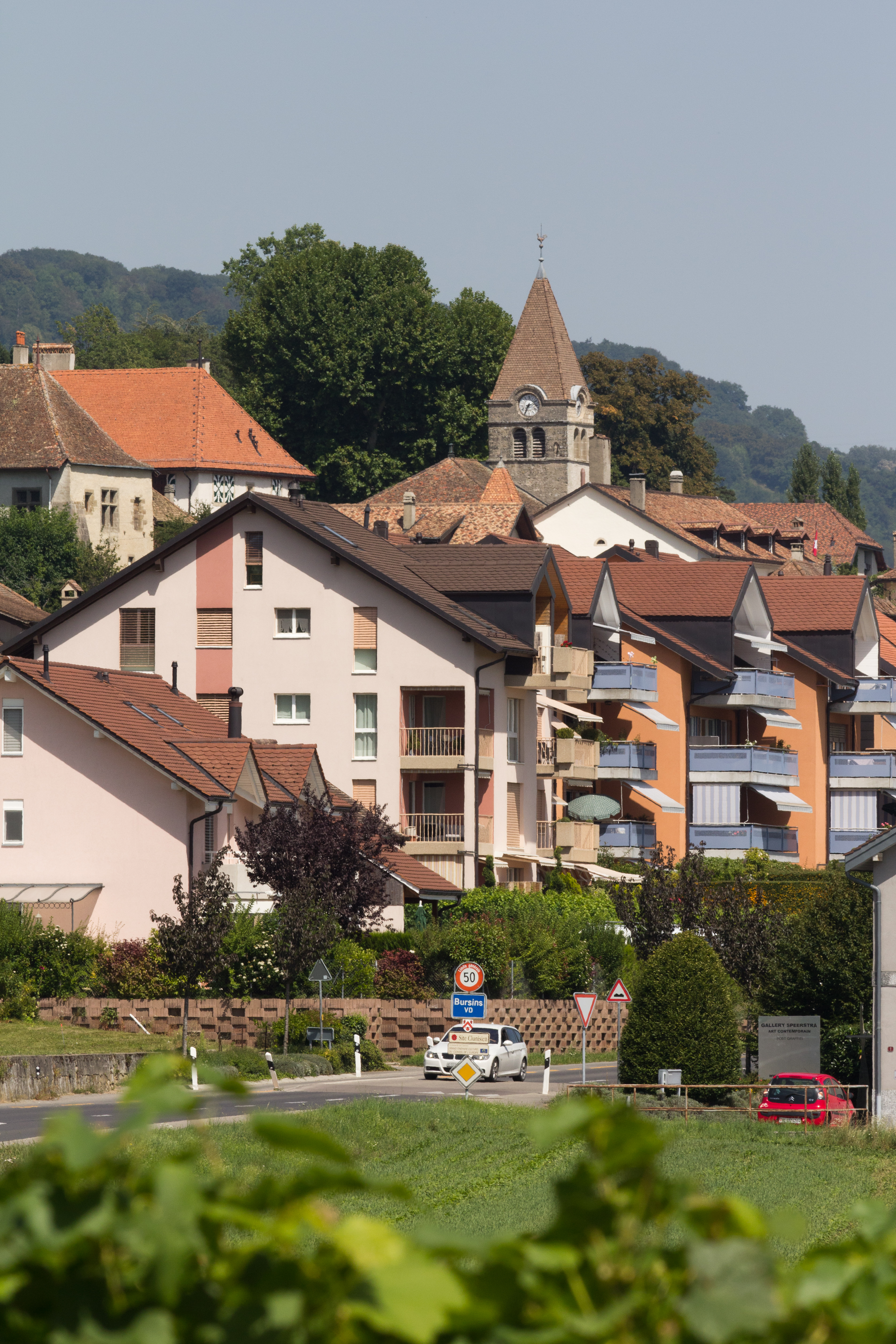

- Flag Coat of arms
- Location of Bursins
- Location within Switzerland Location within Canton of Vaud
- Coordinates: 46°27′N 6°17′E
- Country: Switzerland
- Canton: Vaud
- District: Nyon

Government
  - Mayor: Syndic; Antoinette Hauswirth

Area
  - Total: 3.36 km^{2} (1.30 sq mi)
- Elevation: 483 m (1,585 ft)

Population (2004)
  - Total: 646
  - Density: 192/km^{2} (498/sq mi)
- Demonym(s): Les Bursinois; Lè Caca-drâtse; Lè Medze-faye
- Time zone: UTC+01:00 (CET)
  - Summer (DST): UTC+02:00 (CEST)
- Postal code: 1183
- SFOS number: 5853
- ISO 3166 code: CH-VD
- Localities: Le Vernay
- Surrounded by: Burtigny, Gilly, Bursinel, Dully, Luins, Vinzel
- Website: www.bursins.ch

Bursins (French pronunciation: [byʁsɛ̃]) is a municipality in the district of Nyon in the canton of Vaud, Switzerland.

== History ==
Bursins is first mentioned in 1011 as Bruzinges. In a record that was written before 1031 it was mentioned as Brucins.

== Geography ==
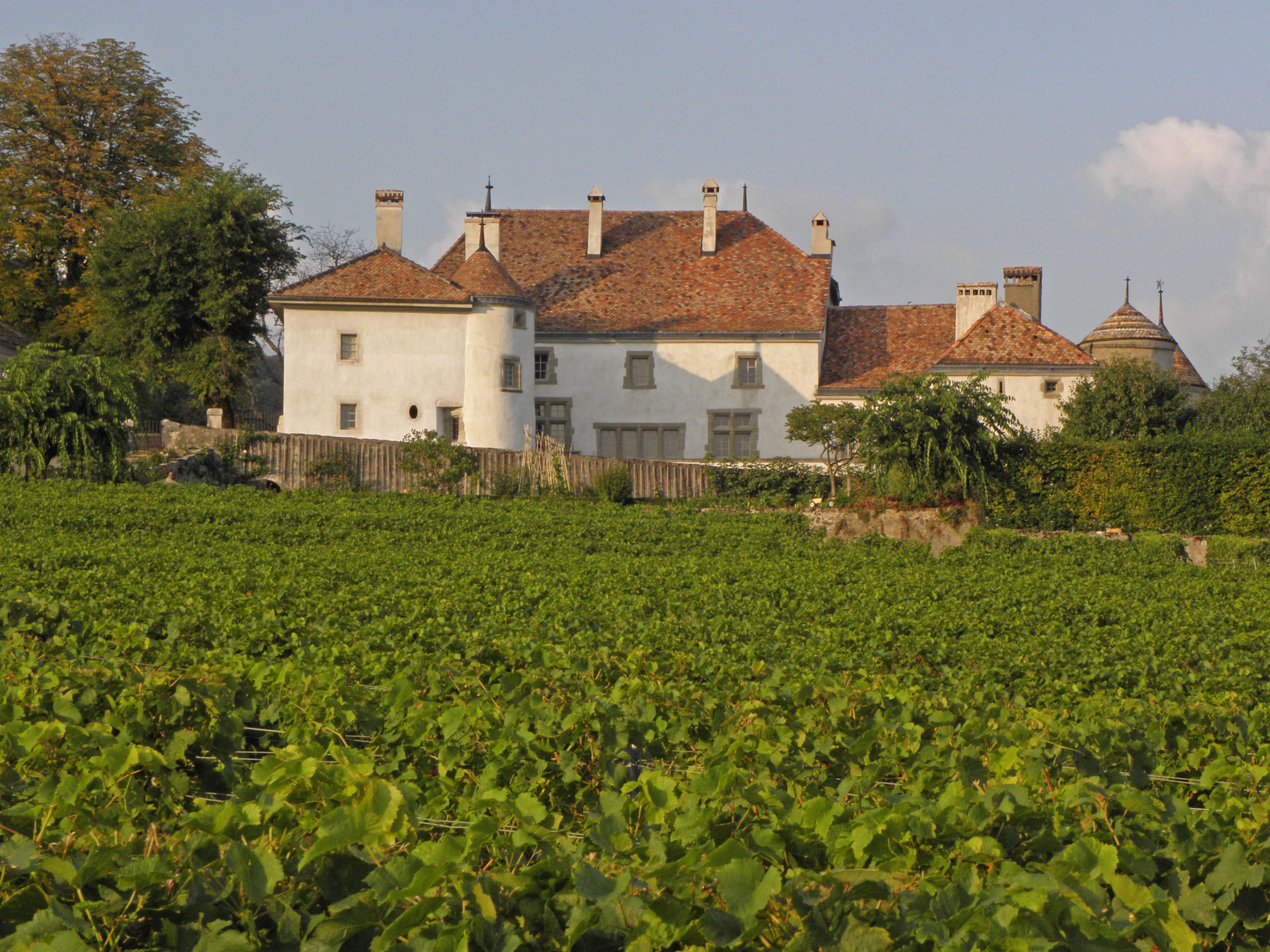
Chateau du Rosey and its vineyards in Bursins

Bursins has an area, as of 2009, of 3.4 square kilometers (1.3 mi^{2}). Of this area, 1.86 km^{2} (0.72 mi^{2}) or 55.2% is used for agricultural purposes, while 1.09 km^{2} (0.42 mi^{2}) or 32.3% is forested. Of the rest of the land, 0.46 km^{2} (0.18 mi^{2}) or 13.6% is settled (buildings or roads).

Of the built up area, housing and buildings made up 6.2% and transportation infrastructure made up 4.5%. while parks, green belts and sports fields made up 1.8%. Out of the forested land, 30.9% of the total land area is heavily forested and 1.5% is covered with orchards or small clusters of trees. Of the agricultural land, 39.8% is used for growing crops and 3.9% is pastures, while 11.6% is used for orchards or vine crops.

The municipality was part of the Rolle District until it was dissolved on 31 August 2006, and Bursins became part of the new district of Nyon.

The municipality is located in the wine producing Côte region. It consists of the village of Bursins and the hamlets of Le Molard and portions of Le Vernay.

== Coat of arms ==
The blazon of the municipal coat of arms is Argent, a chevron Gules, in chief two grape bunches and in base a purse all of the last.

== Demographics ==
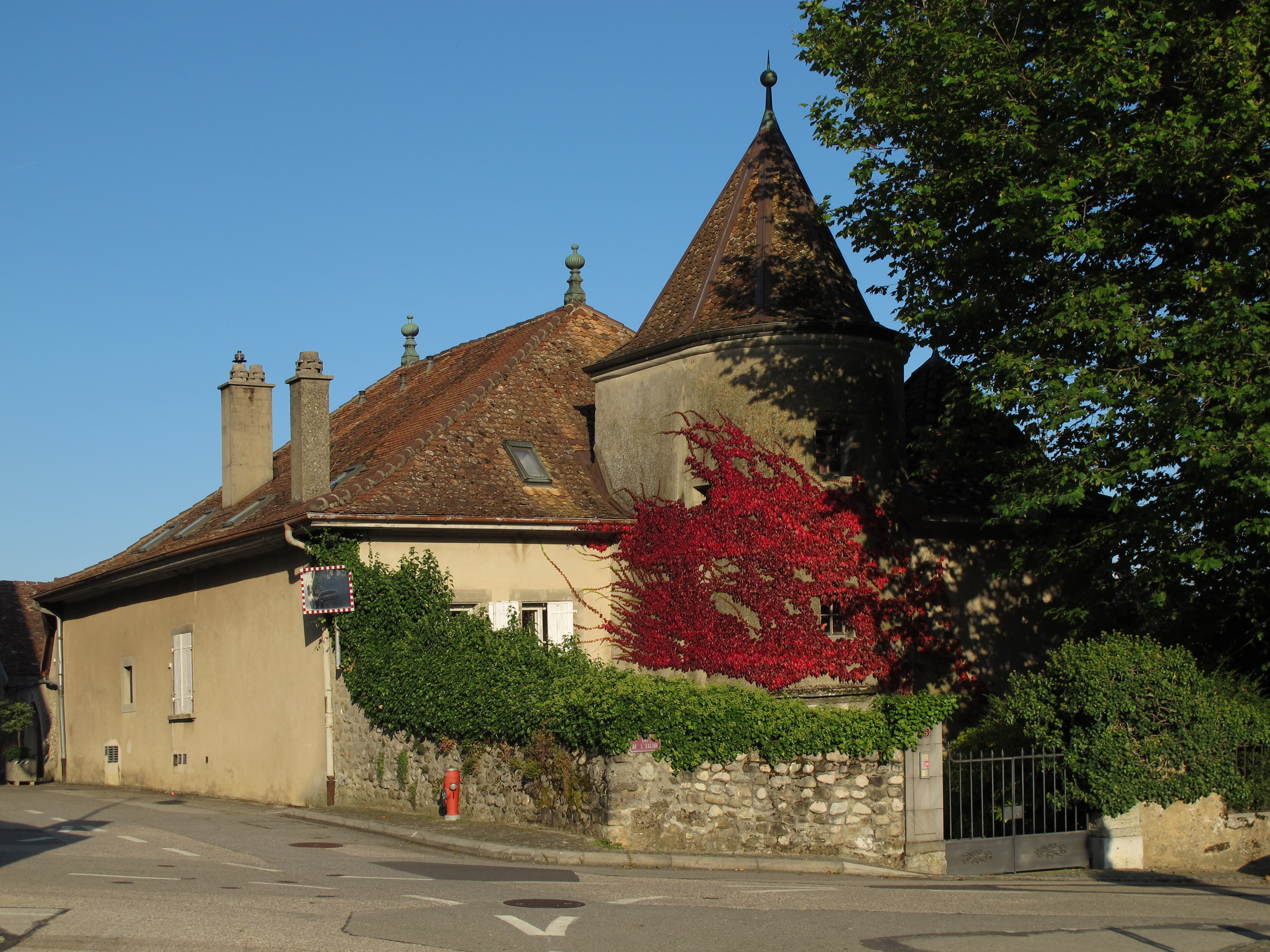
Bursins village

Bursins has a population (as of December 2020) of 779. As of 2008, 23.0% of the population are resident foreign nationals. Over the last 10 years (1999–2009 ) the population has changed at a rate of 45.1%. It has changed at a rate of 35.9% due to migration and at a rate of 9.4% due to births and deaths.

Most of the population (as of 2000) speaks French (437 or 83.7%), with German being second most common (31 or 5.9%) and English being third (23 or 4.4%). There are 7 people who speak Italian.

The age distribution, as of 2009, in Bursins is; 92 children or 12.8% of the population are between 0 and 9 years old and 90 teenagers or 12.5% are between 10 and 19. Of the adult population, 75 people or 10.4% of the population are between 20 and 29 years old. 94 people or 13.1% are between 30 and 39, 135 people or 18.8% are between 40 and 49, and 91 people or 12.6% are between 50 and 59. The senior population distribution is 82 people or 11.4% of the population are between 60 and 69 years old, 42 people or 5.8% are between 70 and 79, there are 15 people or 2.1% who are between 80 and 89, and there are 4 people or 0.6% who are 90 and older.

As of 2000, there were 209 people who were single and never married in the municipality. There were 275 married individuals, 13 widows or widowers and 25 individuals who are divorced.

As of 2000, there were 210 private households in the municipality, and an average of 2.4 persons per household. There were 54 households that consist of only one person and 15 households with five or more people. Out of a total of 218 households that answered this question, 24.8% were households made up of just one person and there was 1 adult who lived with their parents. Of the rest of the households, there are 68 married couples without children, 68 married couples with children There were 13 single parents with a child or children. There were 6 households that were made up of unrelated people and 8 households that were made up of some sort of institution or another collective housing.

In 2000 there were 80 single family homes (or 52.6% of the total) out of a total of 152 inhabited buildings. There were 39 multi-family buildings (25.7%), along with 26 multi-purpose buildings that were mostly used for housing (17.1%) and 7 other use buildings (commercial or industrial) that also had some housing (4.6%).

In 2000, a total of 201 apartments (84.8% of the total) were permanently occupied, while 29 apartments (12.2%) were seasonally occupied and 7 apartments (3.0%) were empty. As of 2009, the construction rate of new housing units was 0 new units per 1000 residents. The vacancy rate for the municipality, in 2010, was 0%.

The historical population is given in the following chart:

=== Famous residents ===
Famous residents have included the English-born actor Peter Ustinov, who died in 2004 and is buried in Bursins.

== Heritage sites of national significance ==
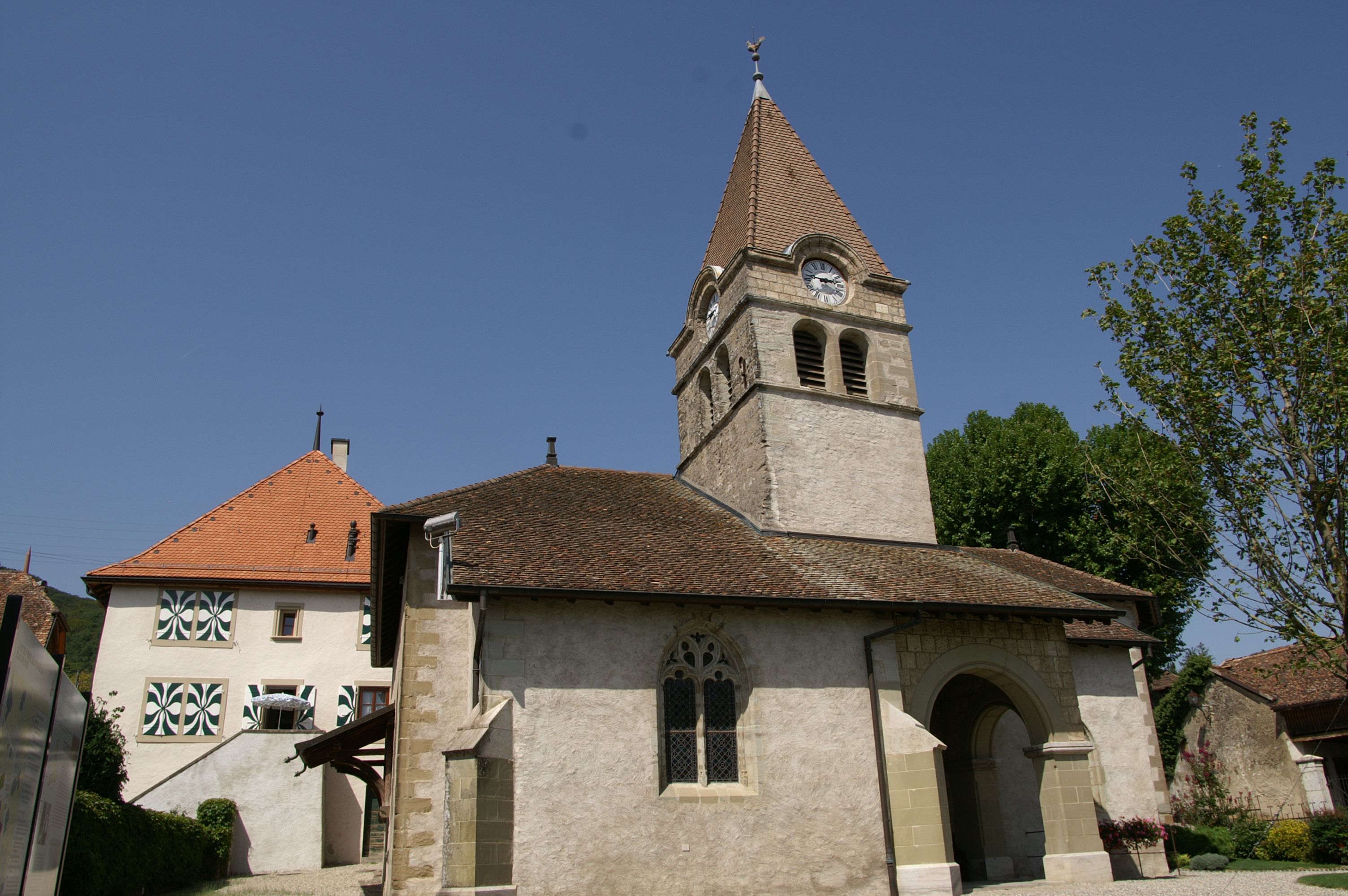
The Church of Saint-Martin

The Swiss Reformed Church of Saint-Martin and the Tuilerie de Vinzel avec four Hoffmann are listed as Swiss heritage site of national significance. The entire village of Bursins is part of the Inventory of Swiss Heritage Sites.

== Politics ==
In the 2007 federal election the most popular party was the SVP which received 34.1% of the vote. The next three most popular parties were the FDP (15.57%), the SP (14.24%) and the Green Party (13.03%). In the federal election, a total of 216 votes were cast, and the voter turnout was 50.7%.

== Economy ==
As of 2010, Bursins had an unemployment rate of 3.1%. As of 2008, there were 37 people employed in the primary economic sector and about 10 businesses involved in this sector. 72 people were employed in the secondary sector and there were 9 businesses in this sector. 296 people were employed in the tertiary sector, with 28 businesses in this sector. There were 293 residents of the municipality who were employed in some capacity, of which females made up 40.6% of the workforce.

In 2008 the total number of full-time equivalent jobs was 348. The number of jobs in the primary sector was 29, all of which were in agriculture. The number of jobs in the secondary sector was 68 of which 14 or (20.6%) were in manufacturing and 55 (80.9%) were in construction. The number of jobs in the tertiary sector was 251. In the tertiary sector; 43 or 17.1% were in wholesale or retail sales or the repair of motor vehicles, 9 or 3.6% were in the movement and storage of goods, 41 or 16.3% were in a hotel or restaurant, 2 or 0.8% were in the information industry, 2 or 0.8% were technical professionals or scientists, 2 or 0.8% were in education.

In 2000, there were 237 workers who commuted into the municipality and 207 workers who commuted away. The municipality is a net importer of workers, with about 1.1 workers entering the municipality for every one leaving. About 6.3% of the workforce coming into Bursins are coming from outside Switzerland. Of the working population, 7.2% used public transportation to get to work, and 65.9% used a private car.

== Religion ==
From the 2000 census, 110 or 21.1% were Roman Catholic, while 287 or 55.0% belonged to the Swiss Reformed Church. Of the rest of the population, there were 3 members of an Orthodox church (or about 0.57% of the population), there were 5 individuals (or about 0.96% of the population) who belonged to the Christian Catholic Church, and there were 10 individuals (or about 1.92% of the population) who belonged to another Christian church. There was 1 individual who was Jewish, and there was 1 individual who was Islamic. 78 (or about 14.94% of the population) belonged to no church, are agnostic or atheist, and 31 individuals (or about 5.94% of the population) did not answer the question.

== Education ==
In Bursins about 201 or (38.5%) of the population have completed non-mandatory upper secondary education, and 106 or (20.3%) have completed additional higher education (either university or a Fachhochschule). Of the 106 who completed tertiary schooling, 51.9% were Swiss men, 25.5% were Swiss women, 16.0% were non-Swiss men and 6.6% were non-Swiss women.

In the 2009/2010 school year there were a total of 92 students in the Bursins school district. In the Vaud cantonal school system, two years of non-obligatory pre-school are provided by the political districts. During the school year, the political district provided pre-school care for a total of 1,249 children of which 563 children (45.1%) received subsidized pre-school care. The canton's primary school program requires students to attend for four years. There were 50 students in the municipal primary school program. The obligatory lower secondary school program lasts for six years and there were 41 students in those schools. There was also 1 student who was home schooled or attended another non-traditional school.

As of 2000, there were 17 students in Bursins who came from another municipality, while 63 residents attended schools outside the municipality.
