= Allaman =

- Municipality
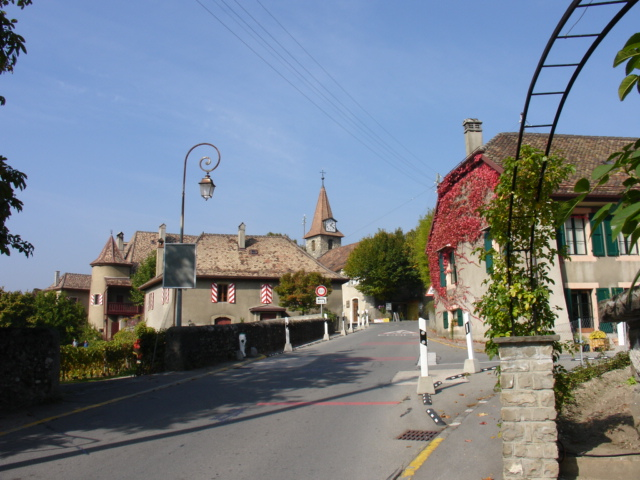
- Allaman village

- Flag Coat of arms
- Location of Allaman
- Location within Switzerland Location within Canton of Vaud
- Coordinates: 46°28′N 06°24′E
- Country: Switzerland
- Canton: Vaud
- District: Morges

Government
  - Mayor: Syndic; Denis-Eric Scherz

Area
  - Total: 2.60 km^{2} (1.00 sq mi)
- Elevation: 408 m (1,339 ft)

Population (2004)
  - Total: 390
  - Density: 150/km^{2} (390/sq mi)
- Demonyms: Les Allamanais; Lè Bregand
- Time zone: UTC+01:00 (CET)
  - Summer (DST): UTC+02:00 (CEST)
- Postal code: 1165
- SFOS number: 5851
- ISO 3166 code: CH-VD
- Surrounded by: Aubonne, Etoy, Buchillon, Perroy, Féchy
- Website: www.allaman.ch

Allaman (French pronunciation: [alamɑ̃]) is a municipality in the district of Morges in the canton of Vaud in Switzerland.

The village is famous for the medieval Allaman Castle (Château d'Allaman), built by the Count of Vaud in 1253.

== History ==
Allaman is first mentioned in 1234 as Alamant.

Aerial view (1946)

== Allaman Castle ==
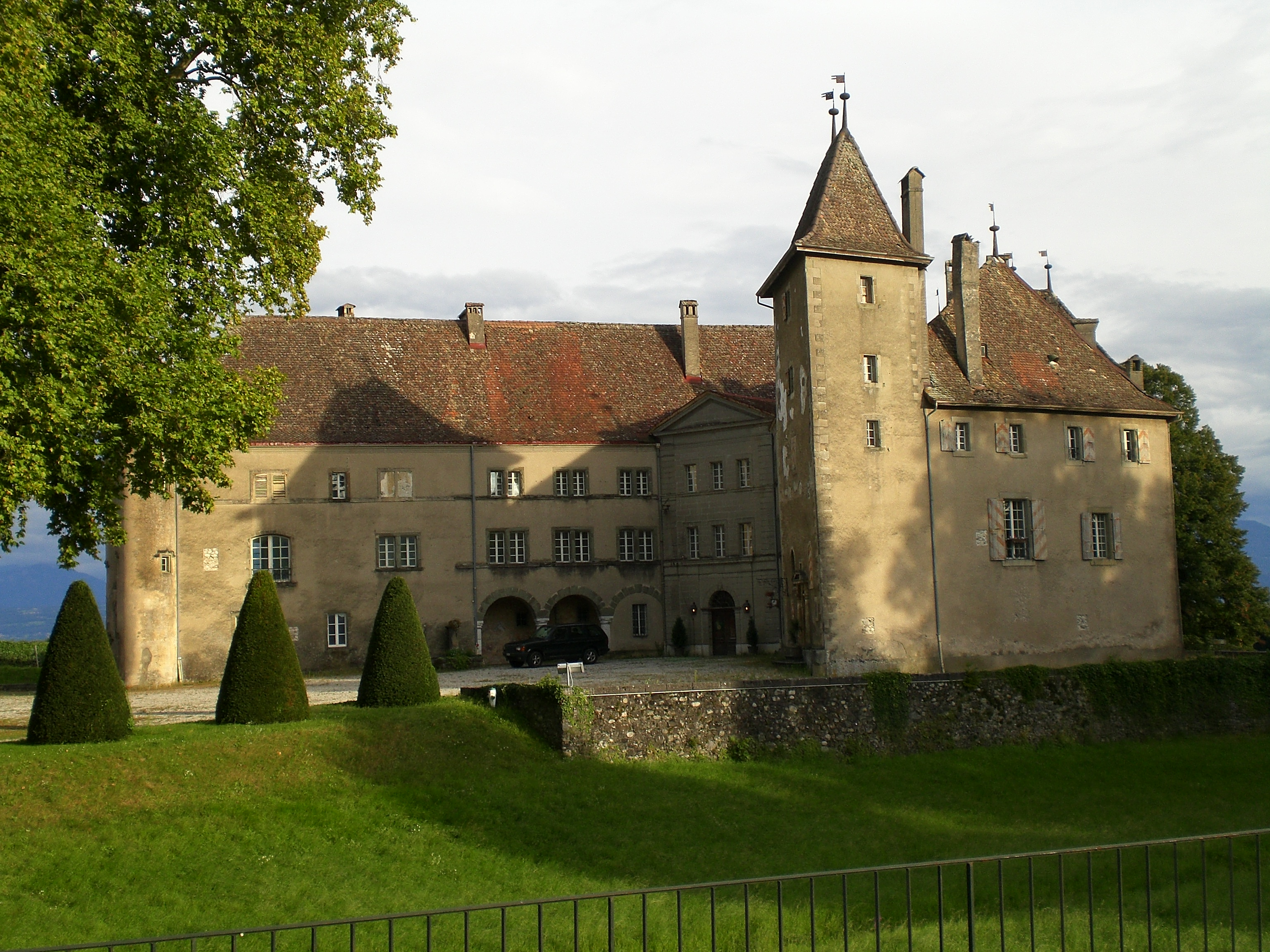
Allaman Castle

The wealthy Genevan philanthropist Jean-Jacques de Sellon, who owned the property until 1839, gave accommodation at the castle to, amongst many others, such political refugees as Napoleon's brother Joseph Bonaparte, Joséphine de Beauharnais, the Duke of Bassano, the Count Camille Cavour, Voltaire as well as to Franz Liszt and George Sand. In 1830 de Sellon founded the Society of Peace, a forerunner of the League of Nations and the United Nations Organization (UNO).

Being one of the largest private properties of Switzerland, the private estate spans over 330'000 square metres (33 hectares/ 85 acres) and offers some 6'000 (60'000 square feet) of living space. The estate is surrounded by private forests, parks, gardens and its own Grand Cru vine yards.

In 2012 the property was completing a 5-year renovation, restoration and acclaimed property re-development that unite the vast 12th-century historical and architectural heritage with 21st-century living comfort and security standards.

The property is owned by a Swiss-German family.

== Geography ==
Allaman has an area, as of 2012, of 2.60–2.59 square kilometers (1.00 sq mi) (depending on calculation method). Of this area, 1.51 km^{2} (0.58 mi^{2}) or 58.1% is used for agricultural purposes, while 0.45 km^{2} (0.17 mi^{2}) or 17.3% is forested. Of the rest of the land, 0.60 km^{2} (0.23 mi^{2}) or 23.1% is settled (buildings or roads) and 0.03 km^{2} (7.4 acres) or 1.2% is unproductive land.

Of the built up area, industrial buildings made up 5.8% of the total area while housing and buildings made up 7.7% and transportation infrastructure made up 8.5%. Power and water infrastructure as well as other special developed areas made up 0.7% of the area. Out of the forested land, 16.2% is covered with heavy forests and 1.2% is covered with small clusters of trees. Of the agricultural land, 19.2% is used for growing crops and 4.2% is pastures, while 34.6% is used for orchards or vine crops.

The municipality was part of the Rolle District until it was dissolved on 31 August 2006, and Allaman became part of the new district of Morges.

The municipality is located along Lake Geneva along the right bank of the Aubonne river.

== Coat of arms ==
The blazon of the municipal coat of arms is Gules, three wavy bars Argent.

== Demographics ==
Allaman has a population (as of December 2020) of 442. As of 2008, 25.3% of the population are resident foreign nationals. Over the last 10 years (1999–2009 ) the population has changed at a rate of 2.9%. It has changed at a rate of 0.3% due to migration and at a rate of 2.9% due to births and deaths.

Most of the population (as of 2000) speaks French (337 or 86.0%), with German being second most common (16 or 4.1%) and Portuguese being third (12 or 3.1%). There are 6 people who speak Italian.

Of the population in the municipality 98 or about 25.0% were born in Allaman and lived there in 2000. There were 130 or 33.2% who were born in the same canton, while 53 or 13.5% were born somewhere else in Switzerland, and 103 or 26.3% were born outside of Switzerland.

In 2008 there were 6 live births to Swiss citizens and 1 birth to non-Swiss citizens, and in same time span there were 3 deaths of Swiss citizens. Ignoring immigration and emigration, the population of Swiss citizens increased by 3 while the foreign population increased by 1. There were 2 Swiss men who emigrated from Switzerland. At the same time, there were 2 non-Swiss women who immigrated from another country to Switzerland. The total Swiss population change in 2008 (from all sources, including moves across municipal borders) was a decrease of 9 and the non-Swiss population increased by 5 people. This represents a population growth rate of -1.0%.

The age distribution, as of 2009, in Allaman is; 31 children or 7.9% of the population are between 0 and 9 years old and 47 teenagers or 11.9% are between 10 and 19. Of the adult population, 54 people or 13.7% of the population are between 20 and 29 years old. 47 people or 11.9% are between 30 and 39, 72 people or 18.3% are between 40 and 49, and 50 people or 12.7% are between 50 and 59. The senior population distribution is 46 people or 11.7% of the population are between 60 and 69 years old, 30 people or 7.6% are between 70 and 79, there are 17 people or 4.3% who are between 80 and 89.

As of 2000, there were 166 people who were single and never married in the municipality. There were 197 married individuals, 17 widows or widowers and 12 individuals who are divorced.

As of 2000, there were 164 private households in the municipality, and an average of 2.3 persons per household. There were 55 households that consist of only one person and 10 households with five or more people. Out of a total of 167 households that answered this question, 32.9% were households made up of just one person and there was 1 adult who lived with their parents. Of the rest of the households, there are 49 married couples without children, 50 married couples with children There were 8 single parents with a child or children. There was 1 household that was made up of unrelated people and 3 households that were made up of some sort of institution or another collective housing.

In 2000 there were 64 single family homes (or 50.8% of the total) out of a total of 126 inhabited buildings. There were 27 multi-family buildings (21.4%), along with 20 multi-purpose buildings that were mostly used for housing (15.9%) and 15 other use buildings (commercial or industrial) that also had some housing (11.9%). Of the single family homes 21 were built before 1919, while 5 were built between 1990 and 2000. The most multi-family homes (11) were built before 1919 and the next most (6) were built between 1919 and 1945.

In 2000 there were 190 apartments in the municipality. The most common apartment size was 3 rooms of which there were 58. There were 19 single room apartments and 46 apartments with five or more rooms. Of these apartments, a total of 156 apartments (82.1% of the total) were permanently occupied, while 24 apartments (12.6%) were seasonally occupied and 10 apartments (5.3%) were empty. As of 2009, the construction rate of new housing units was 0 new units per 1000 residents. The vacancy rate for the municipality, in 2010, was 0%.

The historical population is given in the following chart:

== Heritage sites of national significance ==
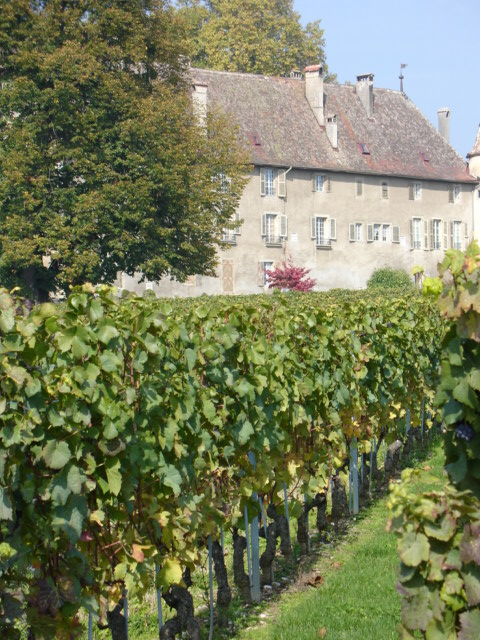
Allaman Castle grounds

Allaman Castle is listed as a Swiss heritage site of national significance.

== Politics ==
In the 2007 federal election the most popular party was the SVP which received 23.87% of the vote. The next three most popular parties were the Green Party (21.95%), the SP (19.27%) and the FDP (10.77%). In the federal election, a total of 130 votes were cast, and the voter turnout was 53.7%.

== Economy ==
As of 2010, Allaman had an unemployment rate of 4.2%. As of 2008, there were 56 people employed in the primary economic sector and about 15 businesses involved in this sector. 51 people were employed in the secondary sector and there were 3 businesses in this sector. 366 people were employed in the tertiary sector, with 38 businesses in this sector. There were 210 residents of the municipality who were employed in some capacity, of which females made up 42.4% of the workforce.

In 2008 the total number of full-time equivalent jobs was 367. The number of jobs in the primary sector was 36, of which 30 were in agriculture and 6 were in fishing or fisheries. The number of jobs in the secondary sector was 50 of which 49 or (98.0%) were in manufacturing and 1 was in construction. The number of jobs in the tertiary sector was 281. In the tertiary sector; 206 or 73.3% were in wholesale or retail sales or the repair of motor vehicles, 36 or 12.8% were in a hotel or restaurant, 2 or 0.7% were in the information industry, 2 or 0.7% were the insurance or financial industry, 1 was a technical professional or scientist, 20 or 7.1% were in education.

In 2000, there were 88 workers who commuted into the municipality and 142 workers who commuted away. The municipality is a net exporter of workers, with about 1.6 workers leaving the municipality for every one entering. Of the working population, 11.4% used public transportation to get to work, and 58.6% used a private car.

== Religion ==
From the 2000 census, 77 or 19.6% were Roman Catholic, while 197 or 50.3% belonged to the Swiss Reformed Church. Of the rest of the population, there were 6 members of an Orthodox church (or about 1.53% of the population), and there were 16 individuals (or about 4.08% of the population) who belonged to another Christian church. There were 17 (or about 4.34% of the population) who were Islamic. 65 (or about 16.58% of the population) belonged to no church, are agnostic or atheist, and 22 individuals (or about 5.61% of the population) did not answer the question.

== Education ==
In Allaman about 125 or (31.9%) of the population have completed non-mandatory upper secondary education, and 77 or (19.6%) have completed additional higher education (either university or a Fachhochschule). Of the 77 who completed tertiary schooling, 49.4% were Swiss men, 29.9% were Swiss women, 7.8% were non-Swiss men and 13.0% were non-Swiss women.

In the 2009/2010 school year there were a total of 43 students in the Allaman school district. In the Vaud cantonal school system, two years of non-obligatory pre-school are provided by the political districts. During the school year, the political district provided pre-school care for a total of 631 children of which 203 children (32.2%) received subsidized pre-school care. The canton's primary school program requires students to attend for four years. There were 22 students in the municipal primary school program. The obligatory lower secondary school program lasts for six years and there were 21 students in those schools.

As of 2000, there were 23 students in Allaman who came from another municipality, while 70 residents attended schools outside the municipality.

== Transportation ==
The municipality has a railway station, Allaman, on the Lausanne–Geneva line. It has regular service to Annemasse, Lausanne, St-Maurice, and Palézieux.
