= Dully =

- Municipality
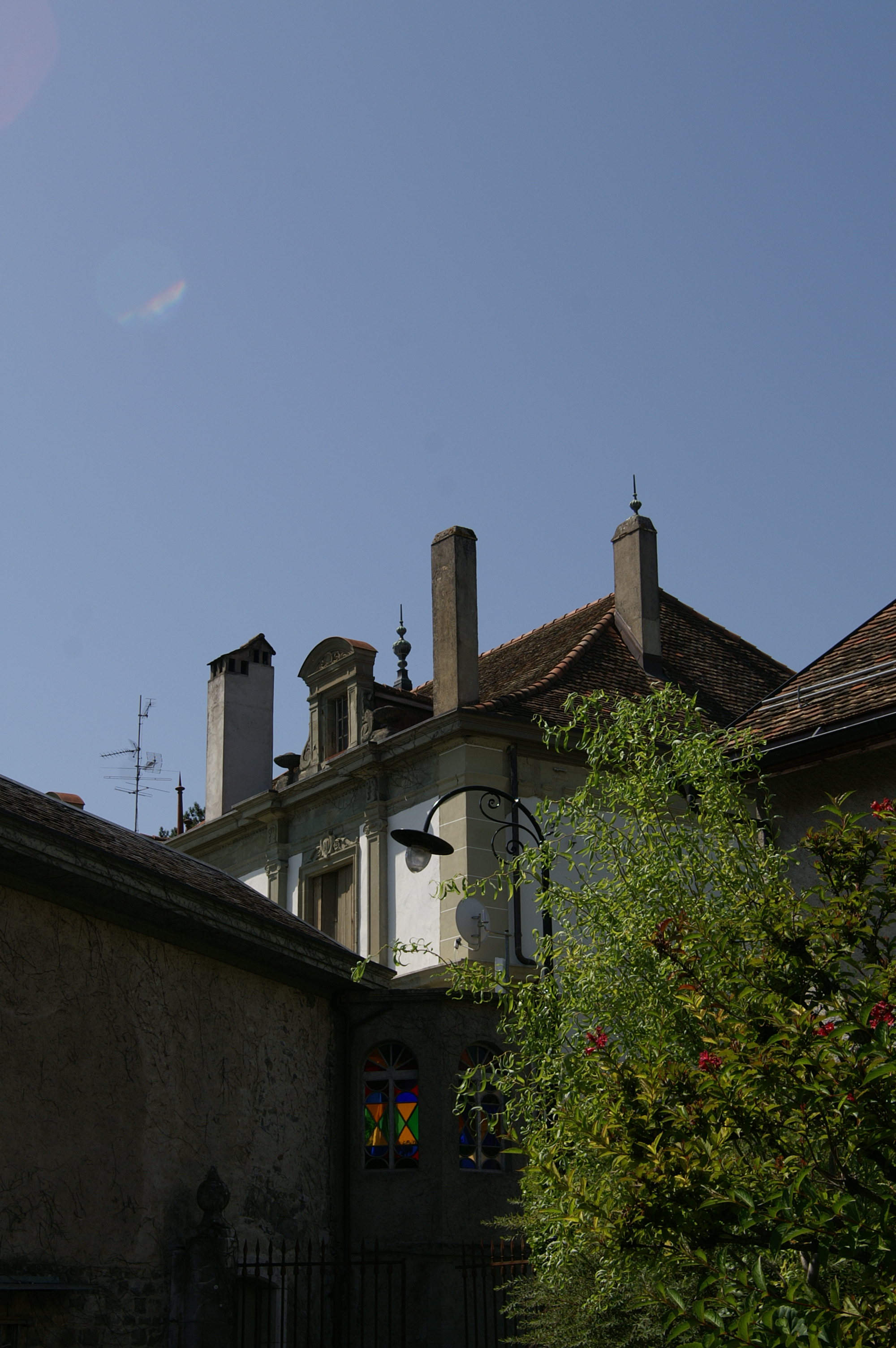

- Flag Coat of arms
- Location of Dully
- Location within Switzerland Location within Canton of Vaud
- Coordinates: 46°26′N 06°18′E
- Country: Switzerland
- Canton: Vaud
- District: Nyon

Area
  - Total: 1.66 km^{2} (0.64 sq mi)
- Elevation: 420 m (1,380 ft)

Population (2004)
  - Total: 454
  - Density: 273/km^{2} (708/sq mi)
- Demonym: Les Perchettes
- Time zone: UTC+01:00 (CET)
  - Summer (DST): UTC+02:00 (CEST)
- Postal code: 1195
- SFOS number: 5855
- ISO 3166 code: CH-VD
- Surrounded by: Bursins, Bursinel, Gland, Luins
- Website: www.dully.ch

Dully is a municipality in the district of Nyon in the canton of Vaud in Switzerland.

== History ==
Dully is first mentioned in 1238 as Delui.

== Geography ==
Aerial view (1964)

Dully has an area, as of 2009, of 1.7 square kilometers (0.66 mi^{2}). Of this area, 0.88 km^{2} (0.34 mi^{2}) or 53.0% is used for agricultural purposes, while 0.25 km^{2} (0.097 mi^{2}) or 15.1% is forested. Of the rest of the land, 0.48 km^{2} (0.19 mi^{2}) or 28.9% is settled (buildings or roads).

Of the built up area, housing and buildings made up 20.5% and transportation infrastructure made up 7.2%. Out of the forested land, 13.3% of the total land area is heavily forested and 1.8% is covered with orchards or small clusters of trees. Of the agricultural land, 31.3% is used for growing crops and 6.0% is pastures, while 15.7% is used for orchards or vine crops.

The municipality was part of the Rolle District until it was dissolved on 31 August 2006, and Dully became part of the new district of Nyon.

The municipality is located in the hills north of Lake Geneva. It consists of the village of Dully in the west and the hamlet of Saint-Bonnet in the east.

== Coat of arms ==
The blazon of the municipal coat of arms is Sable semee of Billets Or, a Lion rampant crowned Or langued Gules.

== Demographics ==
Dully has a population (as of December 2020) of 624. As of 2008, 38.8% of the population are resident foreign nationals. Over the last 10 years (1999–2009 ) the population has changed at a rate of 29.4%. It has changed at a rate of 18% due to migration and at a rate of 8.9% due to births and deaths.

Most of the population (as of 2000) speaks French (274 or 66.2%), with English being second most common (64 or 15.5%) and German being third (43 or 10.4%). There are 6 people who speak Italian.

The age distribution, as of 2009, in Dully is; 79 children or 14.1% of the population are between 0 and 9 years old and 74 teenagers or 13.2% are between 10 and 19. Of the adult population, 51 people or 9.1% of the population are between 20 and 29 years old. 78 people or 14.0% are between 30 and 39, 94 people or 16.8% are between 40 and 49, and 70 people or 12.5% are between 50 and 59. The senior population distribution is 57 people or 10.2% of the population are between 60 and 69 years old, 33 people or 5.9% are between 70 and 79, there are 19 people or 3.4% who are between 80 and 89, and there are 4 people or 0.7% who are 90 and older.

As of 2000, there were 162 people who were single and never married in the municipality. There were 223 married individuals, 10 widows or widowers and 19 individuals who are divorced.

As of 2000, there were 161 private households in the municipality, and an average of 2.5 persons per household. There were 42 households that consist of only one person and 18 households with five or more people. Out of a total of 165 households that answered this question, 25.5% were households made up of just one person and there was 1 adult who lived with their parents. Of the rest of the households, there are 49 married couples without children, 59 married couples with children There were 7 single parents with a child or children. There were 3 households that were made up of unrelated people and 4 households that were made up of some sort of institution or another collective housing.

In 2000 there were 116 single family homes (or 81.7% of the total) out of a total of 142 inhabited buildings. There were 14 multi-family buildings (9.9%), along with 7 multi-purpose buildings that were mostly used for housing (4.9%) and 5 other use buildings (commercial or industrial) that also had some housing (3.5%).

In 2000, a total of 151 apartments (86.8% of the total) were permanently occupied, while 21 apartments (12.1%) were seasonally occupied and 2 apartments (1.1%) were empty. As of 2009, the construction rate of new housing units was 1.7 new units per 1000 residents. The vacancy rate for the municipality, in 2010, was 6.67%.

The historical population is given in the following chart:

== Heritage sites of national significance ==
Dully Castle is listed as a Swiss heritage site of national significance.

== Politics ==
In the 2007 federal election the most popular party was the SVP which received 32.52% of the vote. The next three most popular parties were the LPS Party (13.63%), the Green Party (11.85%) and the SP (10.84%). In the federal election, a total of 112 votes were cast, and the voter turnout was 44.4%.

== Economy ==
As of 2010, Dully had an unemployment rate of 4%. As of 2008, there were 20 people employed in the primary economic sector and about 4 businesses involved in this sector. 6 people were employed in the secondary sector and there were 2 businesses in this sector. 39 people were employed in the tertiary sector, with 9 businesses in this sector. There were 204 residents of the municipality who were employed in some capacity, of which females made up 39.2% of the workforce.

In 2008 the total number of full-time equivalent jobs was 50. The number of jobs in the primary sector was 12, all of which were in agriculture. The number of jobs in the secondary sector was 6 of which 5 or (83.3%) were in manufacturing and 1 was in construction. The number of jobs in the tertiary sector was 32. In the tertiary sector; 12 or 37.5% were in wholesale or retail sales or the repair of motor vehicles, 10 or 31.3% were in a hotel or restaurant, 1 was in the information industry, 1 was a technical professional or scientist, 4 or 12.5% were in education.

In 2000, there were 31 workers who commuted into the municipality and 161 workers who commuted away. The municipality is a net exporter of workers, with about 5.2 workers leaving the municipality for every one entering. Of the working population, 10.3% used public transportation to get to work, and 71.6% used a private car.

== Religion ==
From the 2000 census, 127 or 30.7% were Roman Catholic, while 151 or 36.5% belonged to the Swiss Reformed Church. Of the rest of the population, there was 1 member of an Orthodox church, and there were 49 individuals (or about 11.84% of the population) who belonged to another Christian church. There were 4 individuals (or about 0.97% of the population) who were Jewish, and 13 (or about 3.14% of the population) who were Islamic. 80 (or about 19.32% of the population) belonged to no church, are agnostic or atheist, and 6 individuals (or about 1.45% of the population) did not answer the question.

== Education ==
In Dully about 124 or (30.0%) of the population have completed non-mandatory upper secondary education, and 142 or (34.3%) have completed additional higher education (either university or a Fachhochschule). Of the 142 who completed tertiary schooling, 37.3% were Swiss men, 19.0% were Swiss women, 25.4% were non-Swiss men and 18.3% were non-Swiss women.

In the 2009/2010 school year there were a total of 50 students in the Dully school district. In the Vaud cantonal school system, two years of non-obligatory pre-school are provided by the political districts. During the school year, the political district provided pre-school care for a total of 1,249 children of which 563 children (45.1%) received subsidized pre-school care. The canton's primary school program requires students to attend for four years. There were 31 students in the municipal primary school program. The obligatory lower secondary school program lasts for six years and there were 19 students in those schools.

As of 2000, there were 11 students in Dully who came from another municipality, while 68 residents attended schools outside the municipality.
