= Vinzel =

- Municipality
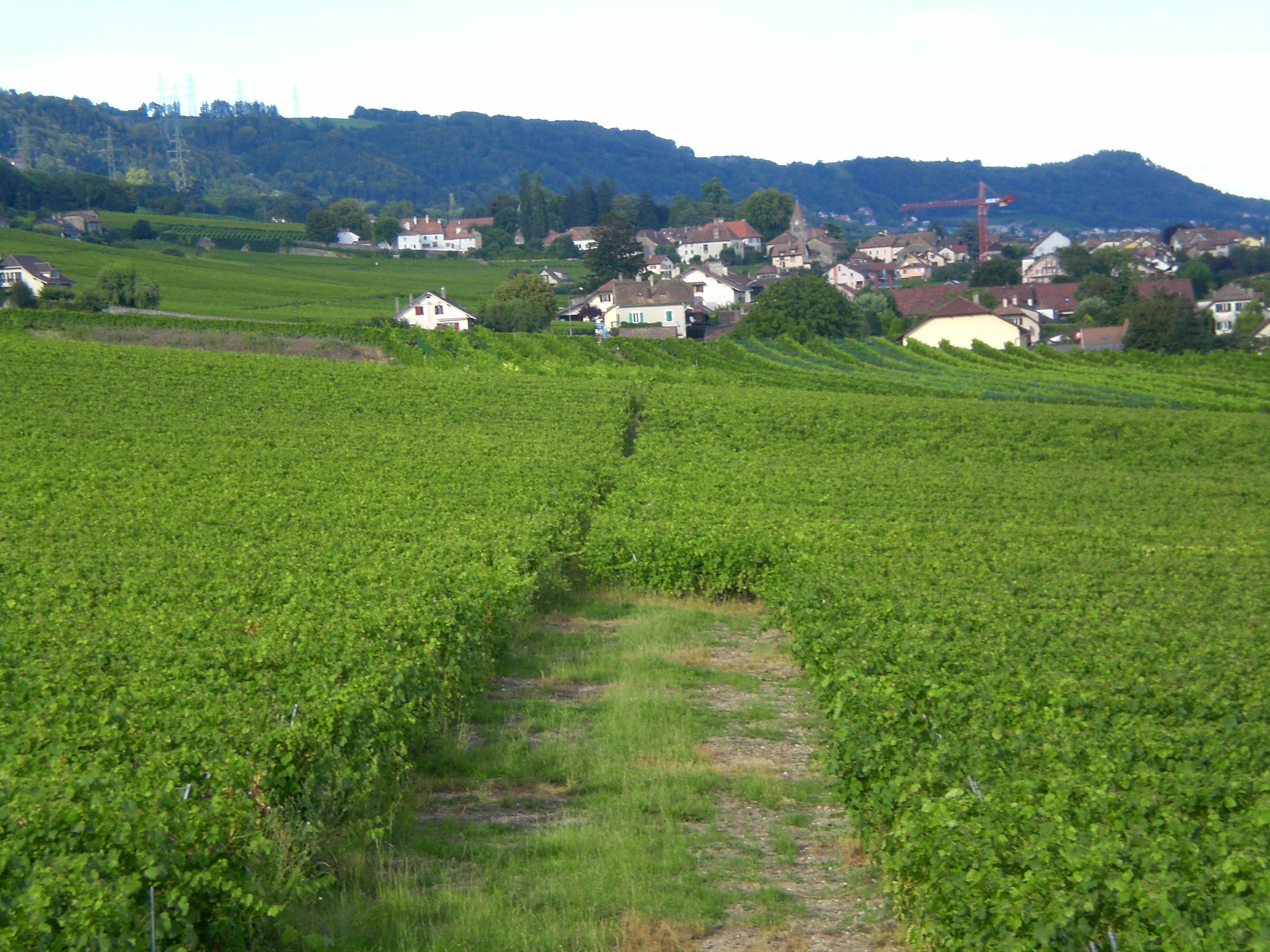
- Vineyards in Vinzel

- Flag Coat of arms
- Location of Vinzel
- Location within Switzerland Location within Canton of Vaud
- Coordinates: 46°27′N 06°17′E
- Country: Switzerland
- Canton: Vaud
- District: Nyon

Government
  - Mayor: Syndic; Thierry CUENOD

Area
  - Total: 1.11 km^{2} (0.43 sq mi)
- Elevation: 450 m (1,480 ft)

Population (2004)
  - Total: 283
  - Density: 255/km^{2} (660/sq mi)
- Demonym(s): Les Vinzellois; Les Sèche-brebis
- Time zone: UTC+01:00 (CET)
  - Summer (DST): UTC+02:00 (CEST)
- Postal code: 1184
- SFOS number: 5863
- ISO 3166 code: CH-VD
- Surrounded by: Burtigny, Bursins, Luins
- Website: www.vinzel.ch

Vinzel (French pronunciation: [vɛ̃zɛl]) is a municipality in the district of Nyon in the canton of Vaud in Switzerland.

== Geography ==
Vinzel has an area, as of 2009, of 1.1 square kilometers (0.42 mi^{2}). Of this area, 0.73 km^{2} (0.28 mi^{2}) or 67.0% is used for agricultural purposes, while 0.21 km^{2} (0.081 mi^{2}) or 19.3% is forested. Of the rest of the land, 0.14 km^{2} (35 acres) or 12.8% is settled (buildings or roads).

Of the built up area, housing and buildings made up 9.2% and transportation infrastructure made up 2.8%. Out of the forested land, all of the forested land area is covered with heavy forests. Of the agricultural land, 44.0% is used for growing crops and 1.8% is pastures, while 21.1% is used for orchards or vine crops.

The municipality was part of the Rolle District until it was dissolved on 31 August 2006, and Vinzel became part of the new district of Nyon.

== Coat of arms ==
The blazon of the municipal coat of arms is Barry of Six, Azure a Mullet of Five Or and Argent.

== Demographics ==
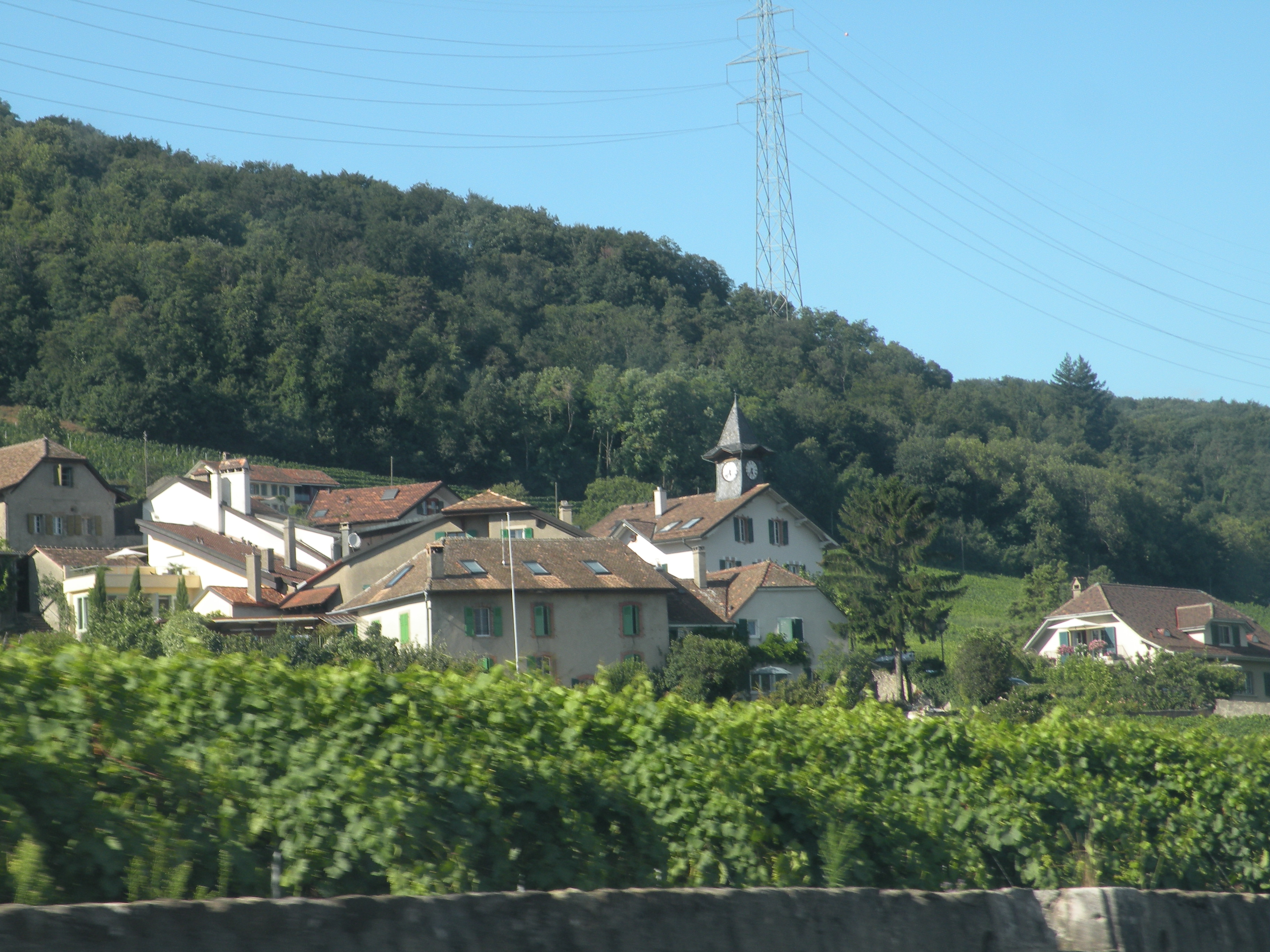
Vinzel village

Vinzel has a population (as of December 2020) of 385. As of 2008, 18.2% of the population are resident foreign nationals. Over the last 10 years (1999–2009 ) the population has changed at a rate of 27.7%. It has changed at a rate of 21.9% due to migration and at a rate of 5.8% due to births and deaths.

Most of the population (as of 2000) speaks French (241 or 81.7%) as their first language, with German being second most common (20 or 6.8%) and English being third (15 or 5.1%). There are 2 people who speak Italian.

The age distribution, as of 2009, in Vinzel is; 49 children or 14.0% of the population are between 0 and 9 years old and 58 teenagers or 16.6% are between 10 and 19. Of the adult population, 23 people or 6.6% of the population are between 20 and 29 years old. 49 people or 14.0% are between 30 and 39, 74 people or 21.1% are between 40 and 49, and 56 people or 16.0% are between 50 and 59. The senior population distribution is 27 people or 7.7% of the population are between 60 and 69 years old, 5 people or 1.4% are between 70 and 79, there are 9 people or 2.6% who are between 80 and 89.

As of 2000, there were 130 people who were single and never married in the municipality. There were 145 married individuals, 8 widows or widowers and 12 individuals who are divorced.

As of 2000, there were 102 private households in the municipality, and an average of 2.8 persons per household. There were 21 households that consist of only one person and 9 households with five or more people. Out of a total of 105 households that answered this question, 20.0% were households made up of just one person. Of the rest of the households, there are 21 married couples without children, 52 married couples with children There were 6 single parents with a child or children. There were 2 households that were made up of unrelated people and 3 households that were made up of some sort of institution or another collective housing.

In 2000 there were 44 single family homes (or 65.7% of the total) out of a total of 67 inhabited buildings. There were 11 multi-family buildings (16.4%), along with 9 multi-purpose buildings that were mostly used for housing (13.4%) and 3 other use buildings (commercial or industrial) that also had some housing (4.5%).

In 2000, a total of 100 apartments (96.2% of the total) were permanently occupied, while 3 apartments (2.9%) were seasonally occupied and one apartment was empty. As of 2009, the construction rate of new housing units was 48.6 new units per 1000 residents. The vacancy rate for the municipality, in 2010, was 0%.

The historical population is given in the following chart:

== Sights ==
The entire hamlet of Vinzel is designated as part of the Inventory of Swiss Heritage Sites.

== Politics ==
In the 2007 federal election the most popular party was the SVP which received 27.82% of the vote. The next three most popular parties were the SP (16.95%), the FDP (15.71%) and the Green Party (14.94%). In the federal election, a total of 99 votes were cast, and the voter turnout was 56.3%.

== Economy ==
As of 2010, Vinzel had an unemployment rate of 4.2%. As of 2008, there were 35 people employed in the primary economic sector and about 8 businesses involved in this sector. 4 people were employed in the secondary sector and there was 1 business in this sector. 36 people were employed in the tertiary sector, with 12 businesses in this sector. There were 155 residents of the municipality who were employed in some capacity, of which females made up 40.6% of the workforce.

In 2008 the total number of full-time equivalent jobs was 57. The number of jobs in the primary sector was 24, all of which were in agriculture. The number of jobs in the secondary sector was 3, all of which were in manufacturing. The number of jobs in the tertiary sector was 30. In the tertiary sector; 8 or 26.7% were in wholesale or retail sales or the repair of motor vehicles, 8 or 26.7% were in a hotel or restaurant, 1 was in the information industry, 7 or 23.3% were technical professionals or scientists, 2 or 6.7% were in education.

In 2000, there were 68 workers who commuted into the municipality and 109 workers who commuted away. The municipality is a net exporter of workers, with about 1.6 workers leaving the municipality for every one entering. About 14.7% of the workforce coming into Vinzel are coming from outside Switzerland. Of the working population, 9.7% used public transportation to get to work, and 63.9% used a private car.

== Religion ==
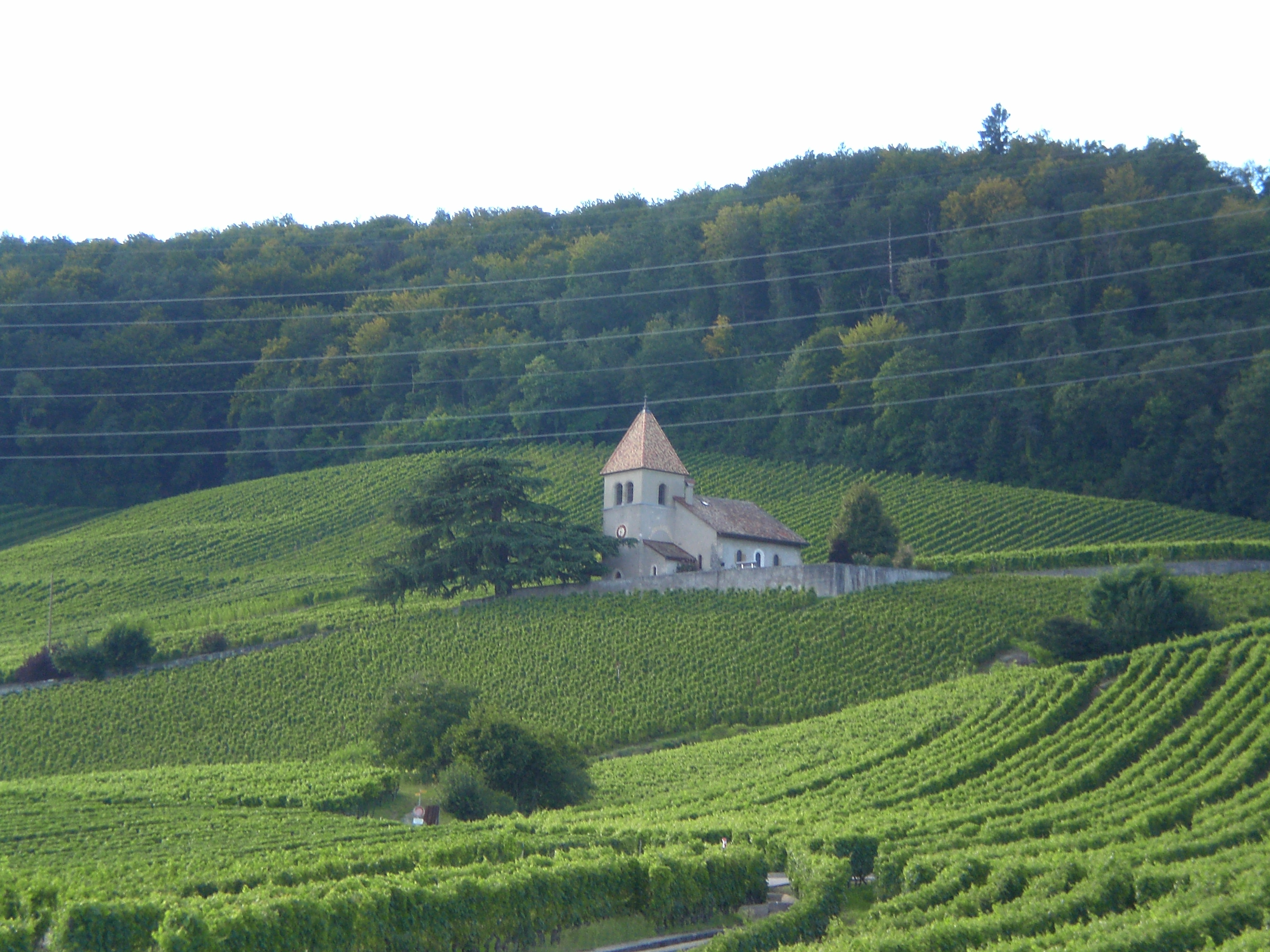
Luins village chapel near Vinzel

From the 2000 census, 102 or 34.6% were Roman Catholic, while 124 or 42.0% belonged to the Swiss Reformed Church. Of the rest of the population, there were 20 individuals (or about 6.78% of the population) who belonged to another Christian church. There were 2 individuals who were Buddhist. 49 (or about 16.61% of the population) belonged to no church, are agnostic or atheist, and 8 individuals (or about 2.71% of the population) did not answer the question.

== Education ==
In Vinzel about 111 or (37.6%) of the population have completed non-mandatory upper secondary education, and 53 or (18.0%) have completed additional higher education (either university or a Fachhochschule). Of the 53 who completed tertiary schooling, 47.2% were Swiss men, 28.3% were Swiss women, 15.1% were non-Swiss men and 9.4% were non-Swiss women.

In the 2009/2010 school year there were a total of 60 students in the Vinzel school district. In the Vaud cantonal school system, two years of non-obligatory pre-school are provided by the political districts. During the school year, the political district provided pre-school care for a total of 1,249 children of which 563 children (45.1%) received subsidized pre-school care. The canton's primary school program requires students to attend for four years. There were 29 students in the municipal primary school program. The obligatory lower secondary school program lasts for six years and there were 30 students in those schools. There was also 1 student who was home schooled or attended another non-traditional school.

As of 2000, there were 15 students in Vinzel who came from another municipality, while 58 residents attended schools outside the municipality.
