= Gilly =

- Municipality
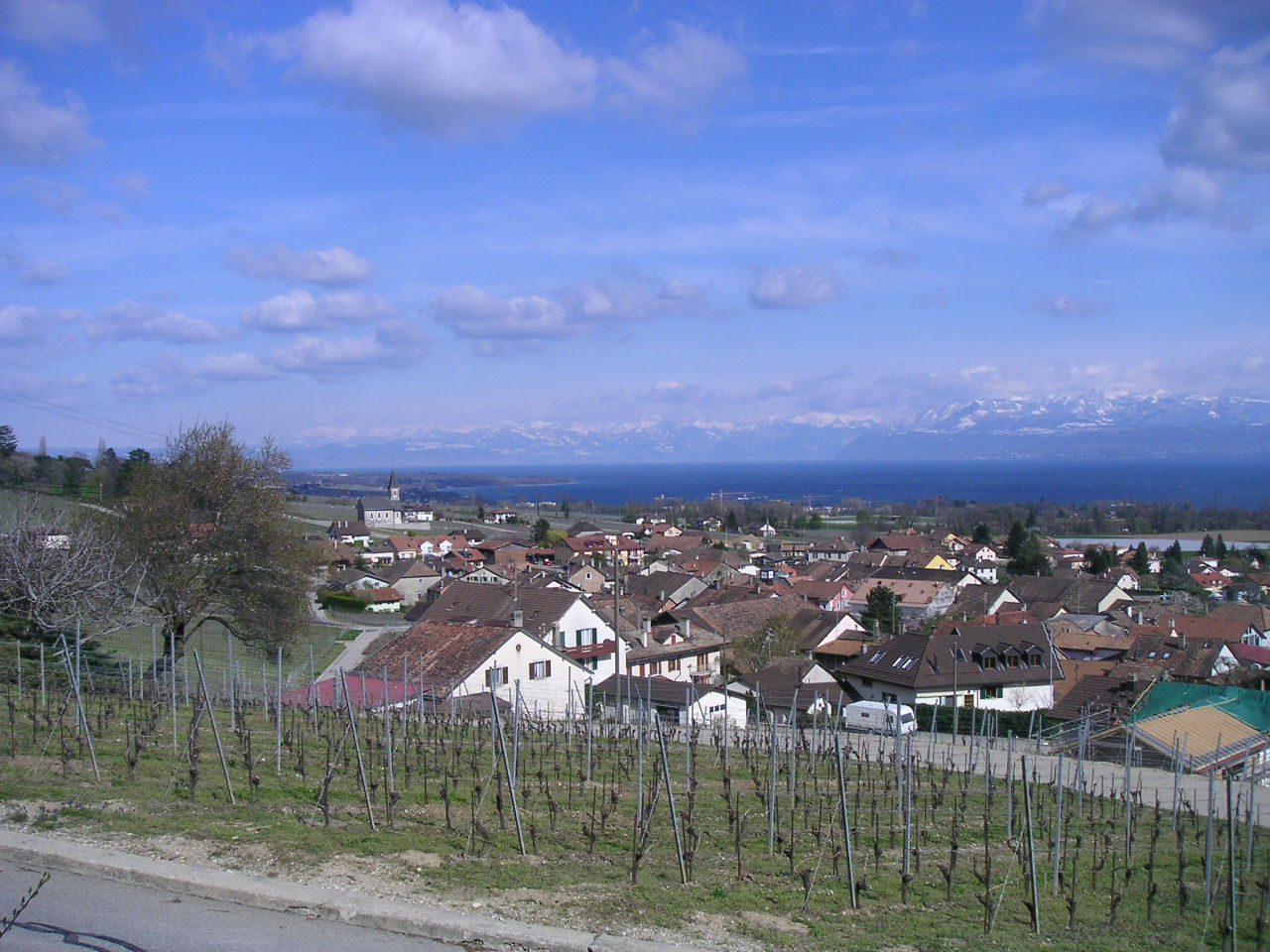
- Gilly village

- Flag Coat of arms
- Location of Gilly
- Location within Switzerland Location within Canton of Vaud
- Coordinates: 46°27′N 6°18′E
- Country: Switzerland
- Canton: Vaud
- District: Nyon

Government
  - Mayor: Syndic

Area
  - Total: 7.78 km^{2} (3.00 sq mi)
- Elevation: 484 m (1,588 ft)

Population (2003)
  - Total: 863
  - Density: 111/km^{2} (287/sq mi)
- Time zone: UTC+01:00 (CET)
  - Summer (DST): UTC+02:00 (CEST)
- Postal code: 1182
- SFOS number: 5857
- ISO 3166 code: CH-VD
- Surrounded by: Bursinel, Bursins, Burtigny, Essertines-sur-Rolle, Rolle, Tartegnin
- Website: www.gilly.ch

Gilly is a municipality in the district of Nyon in the canton of Vaud in Switzerland.

== History ==
Gilly is first mentioned in 1179 as de Iusliaco. In 1278 it was mentioned as Gillie.

== Geography ==
Gilly has an area, as of 2009, of 7.8 square kilometers (3.0 mi^{2}). Of this area, 4.27 km^{2} (1.65 mi^{2}) or 55.0% is used for agricultural purposes, while 2.69 km^{2} (1.04 mi^{2}) or 34.7% is forested. Of the rest of the land, 0.75 km^{2} (0.29 mi^{2}) or 9.7% is settled (buildings or roads), 0.01 km^{2} (2.5 acres) or 0.1% is either rivers or lakes and 0.01 km^{2} (2.5 acres) or 0.1% is unproductive land.

Of the built up area, housing and buildings made up 4.1% and transportation infrastructure made up 5.4%. Out of the forested land, 33.4% of the total land area is heavily forested and 1.3% is covered with orchards or small clusters of trees. Of the agricultural land, 26.2% is used for growing crops and 5.7% is pastures, while 23.2% is used for orchards or vine crops. All the water in the municipality is flowing water.

The municipality was part of the Rolle District until it was dissolved on 31 August 2006, and Gilly became part of the new district of Nyon.

It consists of the village of Gilly and the hamlet of Vincy.

== Coat of arms ==
The blazon of the municipal coat of arms is Paly of six Argent and Gules, overall a Chevron Or; in chief Gules three Escallops Or.

== Demographics ==
Gilly has a population (as of December 2020) of 1,428. As of 2008, 22.9% of the population are resident foreign nationals. Over the last 10 years (1999–2009 ) the population has changed at a rate of 28.5%. It has changed at a rate of 26.1% due to migration and at a rate of 2.9% due to births and deaths.

Most of the population (as of 2000) speaks French (638 or 83.1%), with German being second most common (47 or 6.1%) and English being third (30 or 3.9%). There are 7 people who speak Italian.

The age distribution, as of 2009, in Gilly is; 121 children or 13.0% of the population are between 0 and 9 years old and 139 teenagers or 14.9% are between 10 and 19. Of the adult population, 62 people or 6.6% of the population are between 20 and 29 years old. 133 people or 14.2% are between 30 and 39, 183 people or 19.6% are between 40 and 49, and 126 people or 13.5% are between 50 and 59. The senior population distribution is 77 people or 8.2% of the population are between 60 and 69 years old, 58 people or 6.2% are between 70 and 79, there are 30 people or 3.2% who are between 80 and 89, and there are 5 people or 0.5% who are 90 and older.

As of 2000, there were 305 people who were single and never married in the municipality. There were 389 married individuals, 38 widows or widowers and 36 individuals who are divorced.

As of 2000, there were 314 private households in the municipality, and an average of 2.4 persons per household. There were 95 households that consist of only one person and 15 households with five or more people. Out of a total of 322 households that answered this question, 29.5% were households made up of just one person and there were 3 adults who lived with their parents. Of the rest of the households, there are 92 married couples without children, 109 married couples with children There were 9 single parents with a child or children. There were 6 households that were made up of unrelated people and 8 households that were made up of some sort of institution or another collective housing.

In 2000 there were 122 single family homes (or 54.2% of the total) out of a total of 225 inhabited buildings. There were 48 multi-family buildings (21.3%), along with 40 multi-purpose buildings that were mostly used for housing (17.8%) and 15 other use buildings (commercial or industrial) that also had some housing (6.7%).

In 2000, a total of 303 apartments (84.4% of the total) were permanently occupied, while 42 apartments (11.7%) were seasonally occupied and 14 apartments (3.9%) were empty. As of 2009, the construction rate of new housing units was 2.1 new units per 1000 residents. The vacancy rate for the municipality, in 2010, was 0.7%.

The historical population is given in the following chart:

== Heritage sites of national significance ==
The Campagne De Beaulieu, Vincy Castle and Farm House ECA 148 are listed as Swiss heritage site of national significance.

== Politics ==
In the 2007 federal election the most popular party was the SVP which received 31.23% of the vote. The next three most popular parties were the FDP (17.22%), the SP (16.26%) and the Green Party (12.61%). In the federal election, a total of 259 votes were cast, and the voter turnout was 49.0%.

== Economy ==
As of 2010, Gilly had an unemployment rate of 3.7%. As of 2008, there were 101 people employed in the primary economic sector and about 20 businesses involved in this sector. 32 people were employed in the secondary sector and there were 9 businesses in this sector. 161 people were employed in the tertiary sector, with 22 businesses in this sector. There were 389 residents of the municipality who were employed in some capacity, of which females made up 40.6% of the workforce.

In 2008 the total number of full-time equivalent jobs was 227. The number of jobs in the primary sector was 72, all of which were in agriculture. The number of jobs in the secondary sector was 32 of which 23 or (71.9%) were in manufacturing and 9 (28.1%) were in construction. The number of jobs in the tertiary sector was 123. In the tertiary sector; 29 or 23.6% were in wholesale or retail sales or the repair of motor vehicles, 13 or 10.6% were in the movement and storage of goods, 9 or 7.3% were in a hotel or restaurant, 1 was in the information industry, 2 or 1.6% were technical professionals or scientists, 7 or 5.7% were in education and 54 or 43.9% were in health care.

In 2000, there were 126 workers who commuted into the municipality and 279 workers who commuted away. The municipality is a net exporter of workers, with about 2.2 workers leaving the municipality for every one entering. About 8.7% of the workforce coming into Gilly are coming from outside Switzerland. Of the working population, 9.8% used public transportation to get to work, and 64% used a private car.

== Religion ==
From the 2000 census, 196 or 25.5% were Roman Catholic, while 363 or 47.3% belonged to the Swiss Reformed Church. Of the rest of the population, there were 3 members of an Orthodox church (or about 0.39% of the population), there was 1 individual who belongs to the Christian Catholic Church, and there were 75 individuals (or about 9.77% of the population) who belonged to another Christian church. There was 1 individual who was Jewish, and 16 (or about 2.08% of the population) who were Islamic. There were 3 individuals who were Buddhist and 4 individuals who belonged to another church. 117 (or about 15.23% of the population) belonged to no church, are agnostic or atheist, and 24 individuals (or about 3.13% of the population) did not answer the question.

== Education ==
In Gilly about 259 or (33.7%) of the population have completed non-mandatory upper secondary education, and 127 or (16.5%) have completed additional higher education (either university or a Fachhochschule). Of the 127 who completed tertiary schooling, 54.3% were Swiss men, 28.3% were Swiss women, 9.4% were non-Swiss men and 7.9% were non-Swiss women.

In the 2009/2010 school year there were a total of 114 students in the Gilly school district. In the Vaud cantonal school system, two years of non-obligatory pre-school are provided by the political districts. During the school year, the political district provided pre-school care for a total of 1,249 children of which 563 children (45.1%) received subsidized pre-school care. The canton's primary school program requires students to attend for four years. There were 59 students in the municipal primary school program. The obligatory lower secondary school program lasts for six years and there were 54 students in those schools. There was also 1 student who was home schooled or attended another non-traditional school.

As of 2000, there were 4 students in Gilly who came from another municipality, while 87 residents attended schools outside the municipality.
