= Luins =

- Municipality
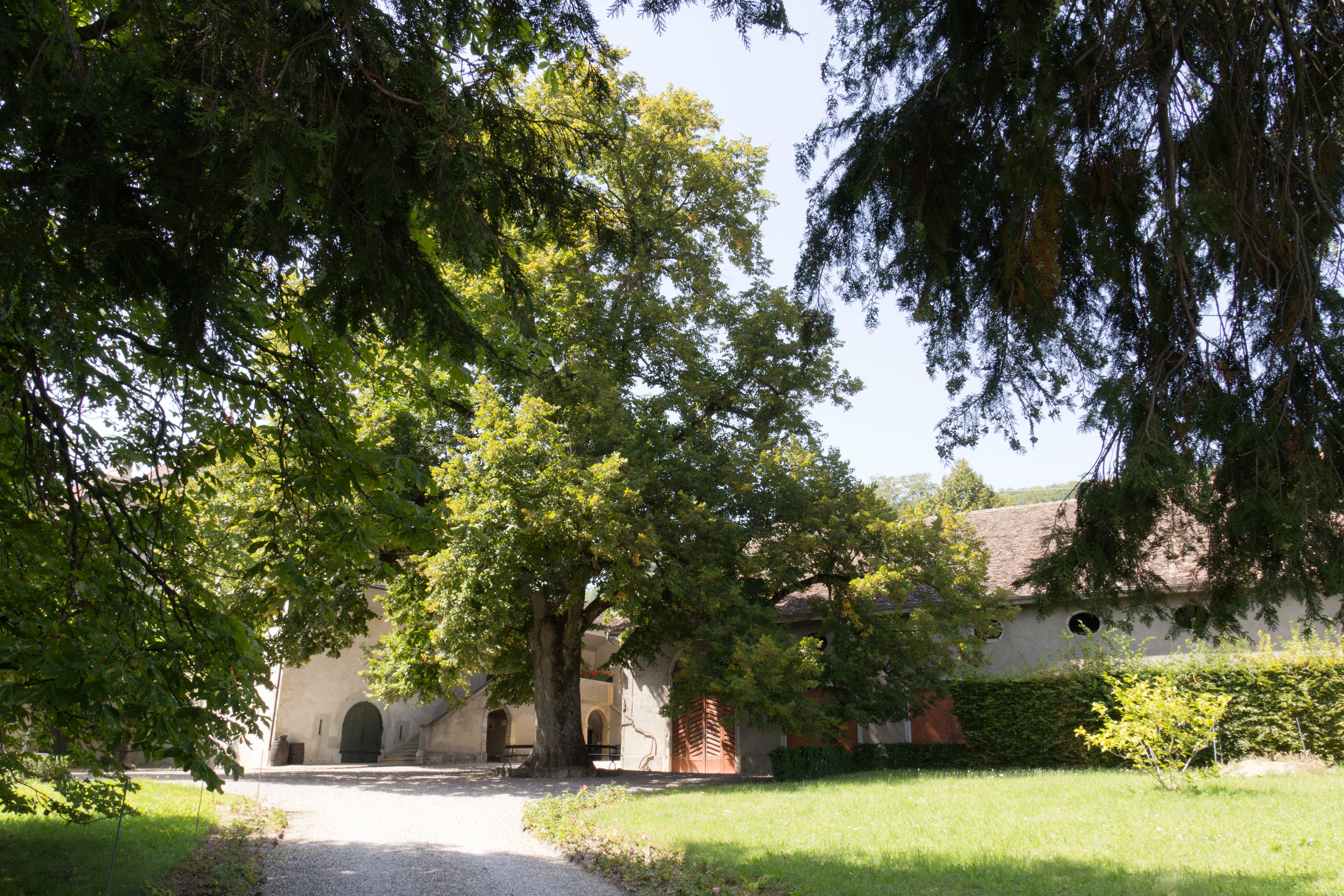

- Flag Coat of arms
- Location of Luins
- Location within Switzerland Location within Canton of Vaud
- Coordinates: 46°27′N 06°16′E
- Country: Switzerland
- Canton: Vaud
- District: Nyon

Government
  - Mayor: Syndic; Jean-Marc Sordet

Area
  - Total: 2.69 km^{2} (1.04 sq mi)
- Elevation: 457 m (1,499 ft)

Population (2004)
  - Total: 471
  - Density: 175/km^{2} (453/sq mi)
- Demonym(s): Les Luinois; Lè Pllianta-saudzon
- Time zone: UTC+01:00 (CET)
  - Summer (DST): UTC+02:00 (CEST)
- Postal code: 1184
- SFOS number: 5858
- ISO 3166 code: CH-VD
- Localities: Le Vernay
- Surrounded by: Burtigny, Vinzel, Bursins, Dully, Gland, Begnins
- Website: www.luins.ch

Luins is a municipality in the district of Nyon in the canton of Vaud in Switzerland.

== History ==
Luins is first mentioned in 1115 as Luins.

== Geography ==
Luins has an area, as of 2009, of 2.7 square kilometers (1.0 mi^{2}). Of this area, 2 km^{2} (0.77 mi^{2}) or 74.9% is used for agricultural purposes, while 0.3 km^{2} (0.12 mi^{2}) or 11.2% is forested. Of the rest of the land, 0.36 km^{2} (0.14 mi^{2}) or 13.5% is settled (buildings or roads), 0.01 km^{2} (2.5 acres) or 0.4% is either rivers or lakes.

Of the built up area, housing and buildings made up 4.9% and transportation infrastructure made up 7.9%. Out of the forested land, all of the forested land area is covered with heavy forests. Of the agricultural land, 49.1% is used for growing crops and 1.1% is pastures, while 24.7% is used for orchards or vine crops. All the water in the municipality is flowing water.

The municipality was part of the Rolle District until it was dissolved on 31 August 2006, and Luins became part of the new district of Nyon.

The municipality is located in the wine producing La Côte region. It consists of the linear village of Luins, the hamlet of Combes, scattered individual houses and part of the former municipality of Le Vernay.

== Coat of arms ==
The blazon of the municipal coat of arms is Per pale Argent and Gules, three Wings two and one counterchanged.

== Demographics ==
Luins has a population (as of December 2020) of 619. As of 2008, 31.7% of the population are resident foreign nationals. Over the last 10 years (1999–2009 ) the population has changed at a rate of 49.4%. It has changed at a rate of 34.4% due to migration and at a rate of 15.1% due to births and deaths.

Most of the population (as of 2000) speaks French (256 or 79.5%), with Portuguese being second most common (24 or 7.5%) and English being third (21 or 6.5%). There are 11 people who speak German, 2 people who speak Italian.

The age distribution, as of 2009, in Luins is; 75 children or 14.4% of the population are between 0 and 9 years old and 58 teenagers or 11.1% are between 10 and 19. Of the adult population, 47 people or 9.0% of the population are between 20 and 29 years old. 99 people or 19.0% are between 30 and 39, 102 people or 19.5% are between 40 and 49, and 61 people or 11.7% are between 50 and 59. The senior population distribution is 43 people or 8.2% of the population are between 60 and 69 years old, 25 people or 4.8% are between 70 and 79, there are 10 people or 1.9% who are between 80 and 89, and there are 2 people or 0.4% who are 90 and older.

As of 2000, there were 136 people who were single and never married in the municipality. There were 146 married individuals, 14 widows or widowers and 26 individuals who are divorced.

As of 2000, there were 140 private households in the municipality, and an average of 2.2 persons per household. There were 53 households that consist of only one person and 3 households with five or more people. Out of a total of 152 households that answered this question, 34.9% were households made up of just one person. Of the rest of the households, there are 31 married couples without children, 36 married couples with children There were 16 single parents with a child or children. There were 4 households that were made up of unrelated people and 12 households that were made up of some sort of institution or another collective housing.

In 2000 there were 44 single family homes (or 49.4% of the total) out of a total of 89 inhabited buildings. There were 15 multi-family buildings (16.9%), along with 26 multi-purpose buildings that were mostly used for housing (29.2%) and 4 other use buildings (commercial or industrial) that also had some housing (4.5%).

In 2000, a total of 139 apartments (93.9% of the total) were permanently occupied, while 1 apartment was seasonally occupied and 8 apartments (5.4%) were empty. As of 2009, the construction rate of new housing units was 0 new units per 1000 residents. The vacancy rate for the municipality, in 2010, was 0%.

The historical population is given in the following chart:

== Heritage sites of national significance ==
Luins Castle is listed as a Swiss heritage site of national significance. The entire hamlet of Luins is part of the Inventory of Swiss Heritage Sites.

== Politics ==
In the 2007 federal election the most popular party was the SVP which received 37.15% of the vote. The next three most popular parties were the Green Party (13.34%), the SP (13.29%) and the FDP (11.86%). In the federal election, a total of 121 votes were cast, and the voter turnout was 46.0%.

== Economy ==
As of 2010, Luins had an unemployment rate of 5.5%. As of 2008, there were 56 people employed in the primary economic sector and about 11 businesses involved in this sector. 48 people were employed in the secondary sector and there were 12 businesses in this sector. 28 people were employed in the tertiary sector, with 11 businesses in this sector. There were 196 residents of the municipality who were employed in some capacity, of which females made up 41.8% of the workforce.

In 2008 the total number of full-time equivalent jobs was 110. The number of jobs in the primary sector was 41, all of which were in agriculture. The number of jobs in the secondary sector was 46 of which 15 or (32.6%) were in manufacturing and 31 (67.4%) were in construction. The number of jobs in the tertiary sector was 23. In the tertiary sector; 8 or 34.8% were in wholesale or retail sales or the repair of motor vehicles, 1 was in the movement and storage of goods, 8 or 34.8% were in a hotel or restaurant, 1 was in the information industry, 1 was a technical professional or scientist, 2 or 8.7% were in education.

In 2000, there were 40 workers who commuted into the municipality and 133 workers who commuted away. The municipality is a net exporter of workers, with about 3.3 workers leaving the municipality for every one entering. About 10.0% of the workforce coming into Luins are coming from outside Switzerland. Of the working population, 9.7% used public transportation to get to work, and 64.8% used a private car.

== Religion ==
From the 2000 census, 108 or 33.5% were Roman Catholic, while 152 or 47.2% belonged to the Swiss Reformed Church. Of the rest of the population, there were 3 members of an Orthodox church (or about 0.93% of the population), and there were 6 individuals (or about 1.86% of the population) who belonged to another Christian church. 43 (or about 13.35% of the population) belonged to no church, are agnostic or atheist, and 12 individuals (or about 3.73% of the population) did not answer the question.

== Education ==
In Luins about 115 or (35.7%) of the population have completed non-mandatory upper secondary education, and 62 or (19.3%) have completed additional higher education (either university or a Fachhochschule). Of the 62 who completed tertiary schooling, 43.5% were Swiss men, 24.2% were Swiss women, 12.9% were non-Swiss men and 19.4% were non-Swiss women.

In the 2009/2010 school year there were a total of 63 students in the Luins school district. In the Vaud cantonal school system, two years of non-obligatory pre-school are provided by the political districts. During the school year, the political district provided pre-school care for a total of 1,249 children of which 563 children (45.1%) received subsidized pre-school care. The canton's primary school program requires students to attend for four years. There were 38 students in the municipal primary school program. The obligatory lower secondary school program lasts for six years and there were 21 students in those schools. There were also 4 students who were home schooled or attended another non-traditional school.

As of 2000, there were 26 students in Luins who came from another municipality, while 36 residents attended schools outside the municipality.
