= Davall =

Davall is a surname. Notable people with the name include:

- Daniel Higford Davall Burr (1811–1885), British Member of Parliament and Justice of the Peace
- Edmund Davall (1762–1798), Swiss-English botanist
- Edmond Davall (1793–1860), Swiss botanist and politician
- Harold Jefferson Davall (1879–1931), American football player and coach
- Thomas Davall (disambiguation), several people
