= Lausonius Lacus =

Lausonius Lacus or Lacus Lausonius was an ancient name referencing a town or region in the country of the Helvetii about Lake Geneva; it was also an ancient name of the lake itself.

The Antonine Itinerary describes a road from Mediolanum (modern Milan) through Geneva to Argentoratum (modern Strasbourg). Sixteen Roman miles from Geneva, on the road to Strasbourg, the Itinerary places Equestris (Colonia Equestris or Noviodunum) (modern Nyon); and the next place is Lacus Lausonius, 20 Roman miles from Equestris (approximately 30 km). To the next station, Urba (modern Orbe), is 18 Roman miles (27 km). In the Table the name is "Lacum Losonne", and the distances from Geneva to Colonia Equestris and Lacum Losonne are respectively 18 M.P., or 36 together. The Lacus Lausonius is supposed to be Lausanne, on the Lake of Geneva; or rather a place or district, as D'Anville calls it, named "Vidi" (modern Vidy). The distance from Geneva to Nyon, along the lake, is about 15 English miles (24 km); and from Nyon to Lausanne, about 22 or 23 miles (35 to 37 km). The distance from Geneva to Nyon is quite close, allowing for the variability of a coastal road; but the 20 Roman miles from Equestris to the Lacus Lausonius is not enough. If Vidi, which is west of Lausanne, is assumed to be the place, the measures will agree better. D'Anville cites M. Bochat as authority for an inscription, with the name Lousonnenses, having been dug up at Vidi, in 1739; and he adds that there are remains there.

Lousanna is the historical Roman settlement in the area, an important vicus where about 1500 people lived at its peak.
