= Épendes =

Épendes may refer to:

- Épendes, Fribourg
- Épendes, Vaud
