= Essert-Pittet =

- Former municipality
- Flag Coat of arms
- Location of Essert-Pittet
- Location within Switzerland Location within Canton of Vaud
- Coordinates: 46°44′N 6°35′E
- Country: Switzerland
- Canton: Vaud
- District: Jura-Nord Vaudois

Government
  - Mayor: Syndic

Area
  - Total: 2.76 km^{2} (1.07 sq mi)
- Elevation: 450 m (1,480 ft)

Population (2015)
  - Total: 164
  - Density: 59.4/km^{2} (154/sq mi)
- Time zone: UTC+01:00 (CET)
  - Summer (DST): UTC+02:00 (CEST)
- Postal code: 1435
- SFOS number: 5915
- ISO 3166 code: CH-VD
- Surrounded by: Chavornay, Épendes, Orbe, Suchy
- Website: Profile (in French), SFSO statistics

Essert-Pittet (French pronunciation: [ɛsɛʁ pitɛ]) is a former municipality in the district of Jura-Nord Vaudois of the canton of Vaud in Switzerland. In 2017 the former municipalities of Essert-Pittet and Corcelles-sur-Chavornay merged into the municipality of Chavornay.

== History ==
Essert-Pittet is first mentioned in 1100 as Exertus. In 1453 it was mentioned as Essers. It was first known as Essert-Pittet before 1764.

== Geography ==
Aerial view (1964)

Essert-Pittet had an area, as of 2009, of 2.8 square kilometers (1.1 mi^{2}). Of this area, 2.26 km^{2} (0.87 mi^{2}) or 81.9% is used for agricultural purposes, while 0.17 km^{2} (0.066 mi^{2}) or 6.2% is forested. Of the rest of the land, 0.31 km^{2} (0.12 mi^{2}) or 11.2% is settled (buildings or roads), 0.02 km^{2} (4.9 acres) or 0.7% is either rivers or lakes.

Of the built up area, housing and buildings made up 1.8% and transportation infrastructure made up 9.1%. Out of the forested land, 4.7% of the total land area is heavily forested and 1.4% is covered with orchards or small clusters of trees. Of the agricultural land, 75.0% is used for growing crops and 5.8% is pastures, while 1.1% is used for orchards or vine crops. All the water in the municipality is flowing water.

The former municipality was part of the Yverdon District until it was dissolved on 31 August 2006, and Essert-Pittet became part of the new district of Jura-Nord Vaudois.

== Coat of arms ==
The blazon of the municipal coat of arms is Gules, three Acorns Argent two and one.

== Demographics ==
Essert-Pittet had a population (as of 2015) of 164. As of 2008, 20.3% of the population are resident foreign nationals. Over the last 10 years (1999–2009 ) the population has changed at a rate of 11.9%. It has changed at a rate of 11% due to migration and at a rate of 2.5% due to births and deaths.

Most of the population (as of 2000) speaks French (108 or 86.4%) as their first language, with German being second most common (6 or 4.8%) and English being third (4 or 3.2%). There is 1 person who speaks Italian.

The age distribution, as of 2009, in Essert-Pittet is; 17 children or 12.9% of the population are between 0 and 9 years old and 10 teenagers or 7.6% are between 10 and 19. Of the adult population, 20 people or 15.2% of the population are between 20 and 29 years old. 24 people or 18.2% are between 30 and 39, 19 people or 14.4% are between 40 and 49, and 7 people or 5.3% are between 50 and 59. The senior population distribution is 18 people or 13.6% of the population are between 60 and 69 years old, 12 people or 9.1% are between 70 and 79, there are 4 people or 3.0% who are between 80 and 89, and there is 1 person who is 90 and older.

As of 2000, there were 47 people who were single and never married in the municipality. There were 57 married individuals, 11 widows or widowers and 10 individuals who are divorced.

As of 2000, there were 59 private households in the municipality, and an average of 2.1 persons per household. There were 19 households that consist of only one person and 2 households with five or more people. Out of a total of 59 households that answered this question, 32.2% were households made up of just one person and there were 3 adults who lived with their parents. Of the rest of the households, there are 14 married couples without children, 16 married couples with children There were 3 single parents with a child or children. There were 4 households that were made up of unrelated people.

In 2000 there were 25 single family homes (or 65.8% of the total) out of a total of 38 inhabited buildings. There were 5 multi-family buildings (13.2%), along with 5 multi-purpose buildings that were mostly used for housing (13.2%) and 3 other use buildings (commercial or industrial) that also had some housing (7.9%).

In 2000, a total of 55 apartments (91.7% of the total) were permanently occupied, while 2 apartments (3.3%) were seasonally occupied and 3 apartments (5.0%) were empty. As of 2009, the construction rate of new housing units was 0 new units per 1000 residents. The vacancy rate for the municipality, in 2010, was 0%.

The historical population is given in the following chart:

== Politics ==
In the 2007 federal election the most popular party was the SVP which received 37.64% of the vote. The next three most popular parties were the EVP Party (16.15%), the FDP (13.76%) and the SP (9.55%). In the federal election, a total of 43 votes were cast, and the voter turnout was 53.1%.

== Economy ==
As of 2010, Essert-Pittet had an unemployment rate of 5.3%. As of 2008, there were 9 people employed in the primary economic sector and about 4 businesses involved in this sector. 4 people were employed in the secondary sector and there was 1 business in this sector. 11 people were employed in the tertiary sector, with 4 businesses in this sector. There were 74 residents of the municipality who were employed in some capacity, of which females made up 41.9% of the workforce.

In 2008 the total number of full-time equivalent jobs was 20. The number of jobs in the primary sector was 6, all of which were in agriculture. The number of jobs in the secondary sector was 4, all of which were in construction. The number of jobs in the tertiary sector was 10. In the tertiary sector; 2 or 20.0% were in the movement and storage of goods, 3 or 30.0% were in a hotel or restaurant, 3 or 30.0% were in education.

In 2000, there were 7 workers who commuted into the municipality and 56 workers who commuted away. The municipality is a net exporter of workers, with about 8.0 workers leaving the municipality for every one entering. Of the working population, 14.9% used public transportation to get to work, and 58.1% used a private car.

== Religion ==
From the 2000 census, 18 or 14.4% were Roman Catholic, while 74 or 59.2% belonged to the Swiss Reformed Church. Of the rest of the population, there were 16 individuals (or about 12.80% of the population) who belonged to another Christian church. 22 (or about 17.60% of the population) belonged to no church, are agnostic or atheist, and 3 individuals (or about 2.40% of the population) did not answer the question.

== Education ==
In Essert-Pittet about 53 or (42.4%) of the population have completed non-mandatory upper secondary education, and 15 or (12.0%) have completed additional higher education (either university or a Fachhochschule). Of the 15 who completed tertiary schooling, 60.0% were Swiss men, 26.7% were Swiss women.

In the 2009/2010 school year there were a total of 12 students in the Essert-Pittet school district. In the Vaud cantonal school system, two years of non-obligatory pre-school are provided by the political districts. During the school year, the political district provided pre-school care for a total of 578 children of which 359 children (62.1%) received subsidized pre-school care. The canton's primary school program requires students to attend for four years. There were 8 students in the municipal primary school program. The obligatory lower secondary school program lasts for six years and there were 4 students in those schools.

As of 2000, there were 17 students in Essert-Pittet who came from another municipality, while 8 residents attended schools outside the municipality.
