= Gallo-Roman villa of Orbe-Boscéaz =

Archaeological site in Switzerland

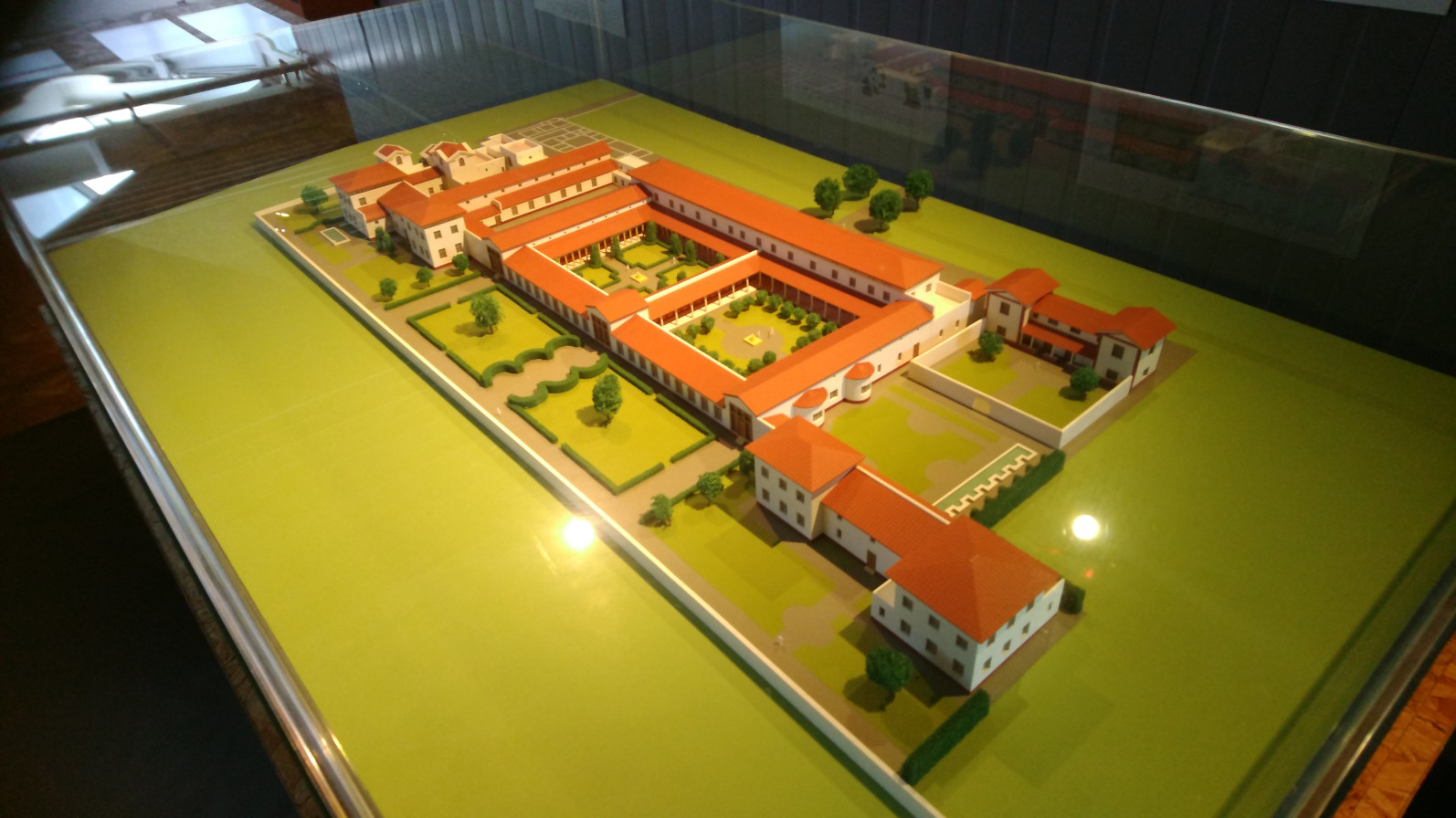

- Location within Switzerland
- 46°43′44″N 6°32′7″E
- Type: Settlement
- Periods: Roman
- Location: Switzerland
- Region: Canton of Vaud

Roman villa with site museum and mosaics

Orbe-Boscéaz, also named Boscéay, is an archaeological site in Switzerland, located at the territory of the town of Orbe (Vaud).

== Description ==
At Boscéaz is the largest collection of Roman Mosaics in Switzerland which decorated a vast Roman villa built around 160 AD. It included private baths and a temple dedicated to Mithras.

The first mosaics were discovered in 1841, the Triton and the Labyrinth mosaics in 1845 (the latter was reburied the same year, then rediscovered in 1930), the Divinities mosaic in 1862, the laurel leaves mosaic in 1863 (reburied and rediscovered several times up to 1925), and the Mosaic of Achilles on the island of Skyros, discovered in 1993, is undergoing restoration. The first scientific excavations were conducted only in 1896, and the site was classified as an historical monument in 1900. In 1976, aerial photographs showed the plan and the extent of the villa, with a residential part more than 200 m long.

Between 1986 and 2004, the villa was a field school for students in archaeology of université de Lausanne. These excavations allowed the study of the whole residential part of the domain (including the discovery of the ninth mosaic, now being restored). They also allowed to determine that the site was occupied since the Neolithic, but also during the Bronze Age and the Iron Age.

The whole site is classified by the Swiss Inventory of Cultural Property of National and Regional Significance. A welcome centre houses a scale model of the villa, an introduction video and a shop.

=== Presentation of the mosaics ===
Nine floor mosaics are known, eight of which are currently open to the public. Most of these pavements have been preserved in their original locations. The numbering used today is the same as in the guidebook written by Victorine von Gonzenbach in 1974, then in the archaeological guide published in 1997.

- Mosaic no.1, known as the "Oriental Triclinium". Pavement with geometric decoration. Western border, discovered in 1925, visible in Pavilion I. Most of the mosaic was excavated in 1987 and is now protected by a temporary shelter pending restoration.
- Mosaic no. 2, known as the "Laurel leaf" mosaic. Pavement with black and white geometric decoration, visible in Pavilion I. This mosaic, one of the best preserved on the site, decorated a room, probably a vestibule, located between the rooms decorated by mosaics nos. 1 and 3.
- Mosaic no. 3, known as the "Western Triclinium". Pavement with geometric decoration. Only the south-west corner, excavated in 1925, has survived and can be seen in Pavilion I.
- Mosaic no. 4, known as "of The Triton". Pavement with figurative decoration. Discovered in 1845 and partially destroyed the following year, this mosaic was one of the most beautiful in the villa. Several preserved fragments, visible in Pavilion II, depict Theseus abandoning Ariadne on the island of Naxos, several animals (lion, panther, dolphin, hare, birds), the gorgon Medusa, floral motifs and two elements of the plant border.
- Mosaic no. 5, known as the "Labyrinth". This figurative pavement can be seen in Pavilion II. The main part is a square representation of the Cretan labyrinth, with a band of geometric decoration.
- Mosaic no. 6, known as "The Rustic Procession". This figurative pavement can be seen in Pavilion III. The preserved part depicts a scene of country life, which has been interpreted in various ways, including as a calendar.
- Mosaic no. 7, known as the "square and diamond" mosaic. Pavement with geometric decoration, visible in Pavilion III. Decorated in trompe-l'œil, with lozenges decorated with ivy leaves and squares with various geometric motifs.
- Mosaic no. 8, known as "the deities of the week". This figurative pavement can be seen in Pavilion IV. Thirteen medallions represent the divinities of the week (Saturn, Sol, Luna, Mars, Mercury, Jupiter, Venus), Narcissus, Ganymede, four couples formed by a Triton and a Nereid; borders with scenes of hunting and animal combat; busts of the seasons personified in the corners (spring, autumn and partially winter are preserved). This is one of the best-preserved mosaics in the villa.
- Mosaic no. 9, known as "Achilles at Skyros". Pavement with figurative decoration, preserved in Pavilion V. Discovered in 1993 during excavations by the University of Lausanne, this mosaic is awaiting development by the State of Vaud (owner of the site) and is only open to the public on rare occasions. Its decoration consists of two panels (surrounded by 30 squares with different motifs) illustrating an episode from the Trojan War: the Greeks, on their way to Troy, come to look for Achilles on the island of Skyros. In the upper panel, Ulysses is shown on the ramparts of King Lycomedes' palace with his slave Agyrtes playing the tuba. In the lower panel, depicting the palace's gynaeceum, Achilles has grabbed his weapons while the women are panicking.
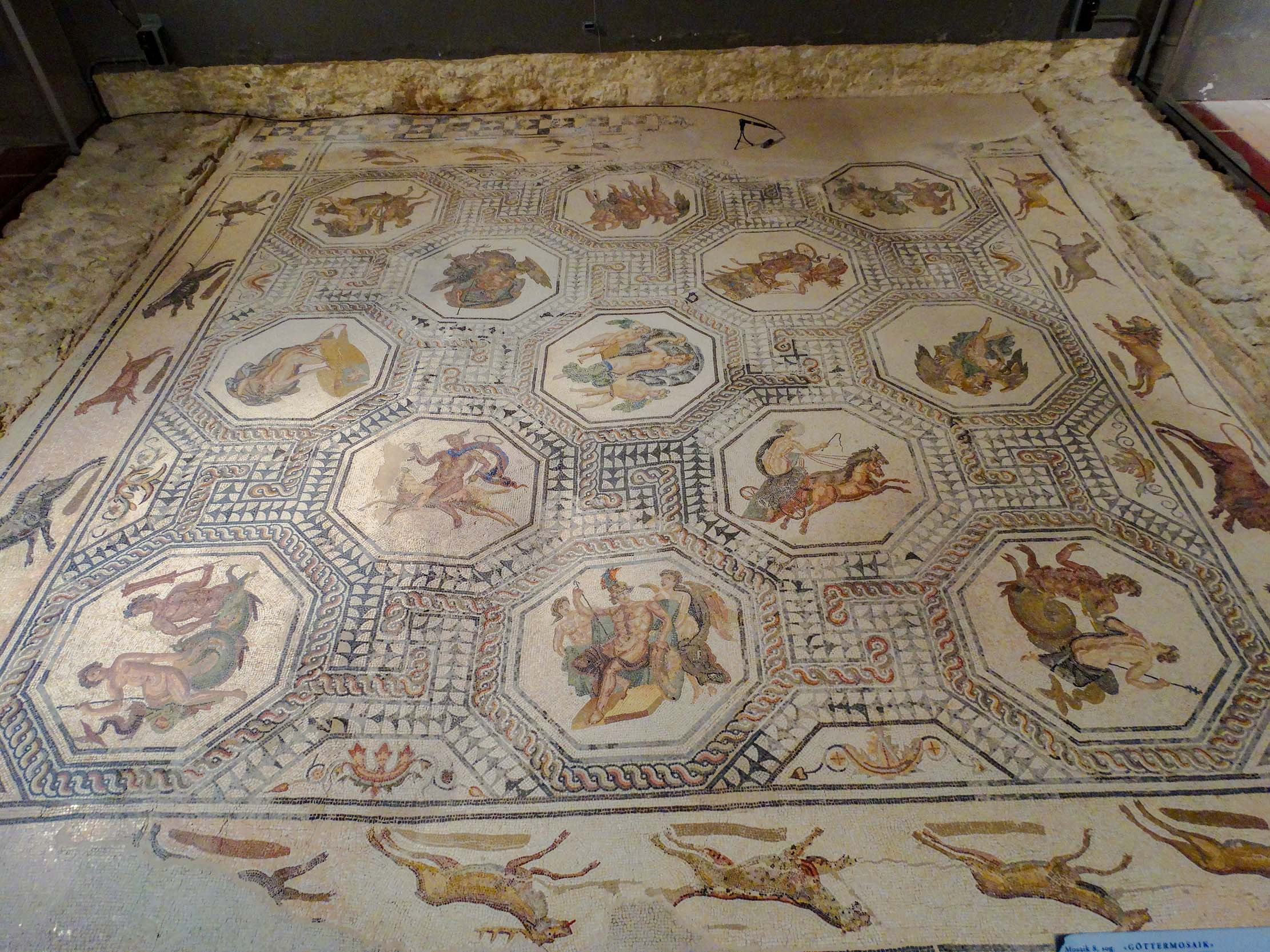
Mosaic of the deities of the week

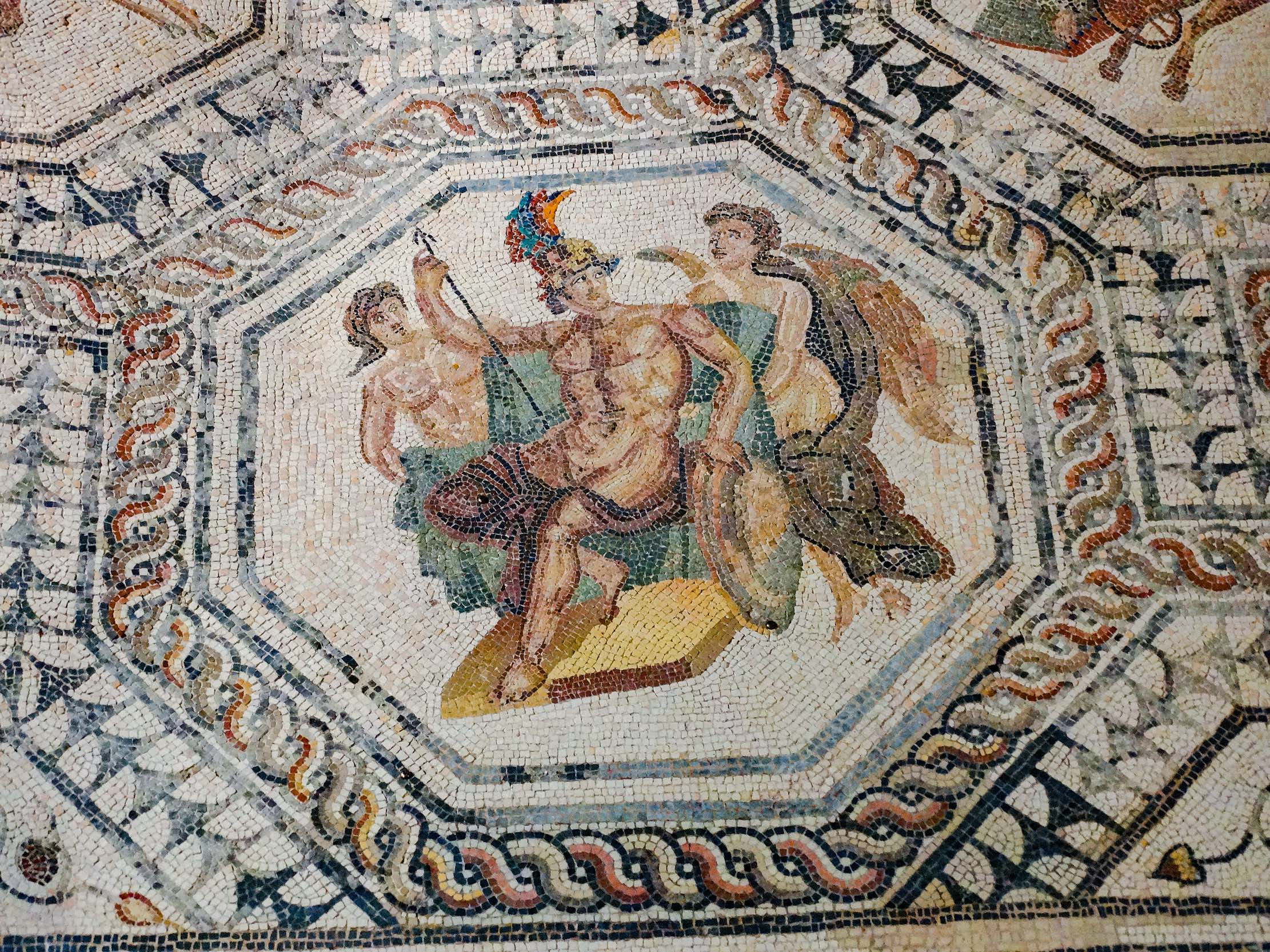
Mosaic of the deities of the week: God Mars

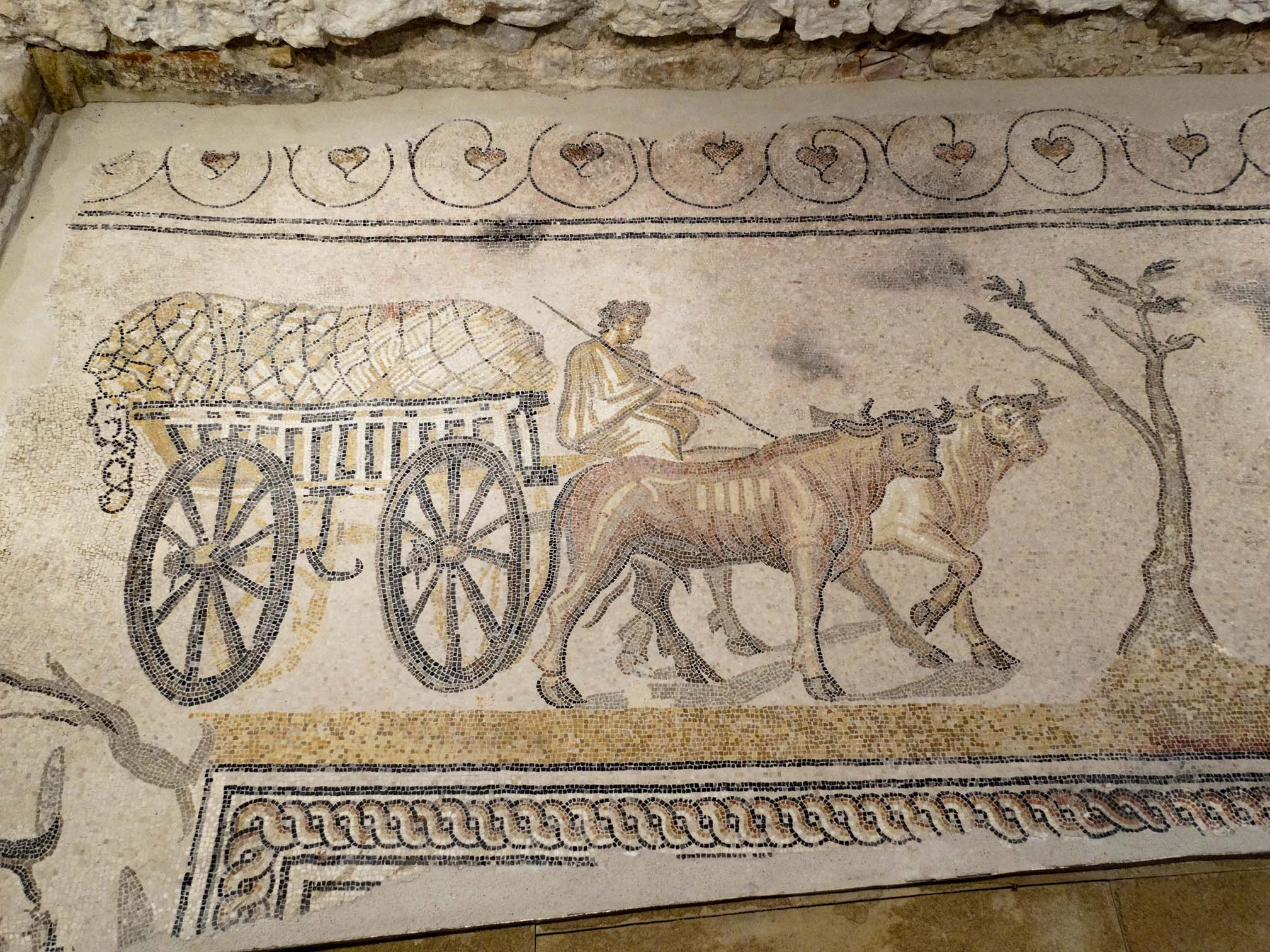
Detail of the Mosaic of the rustic procession

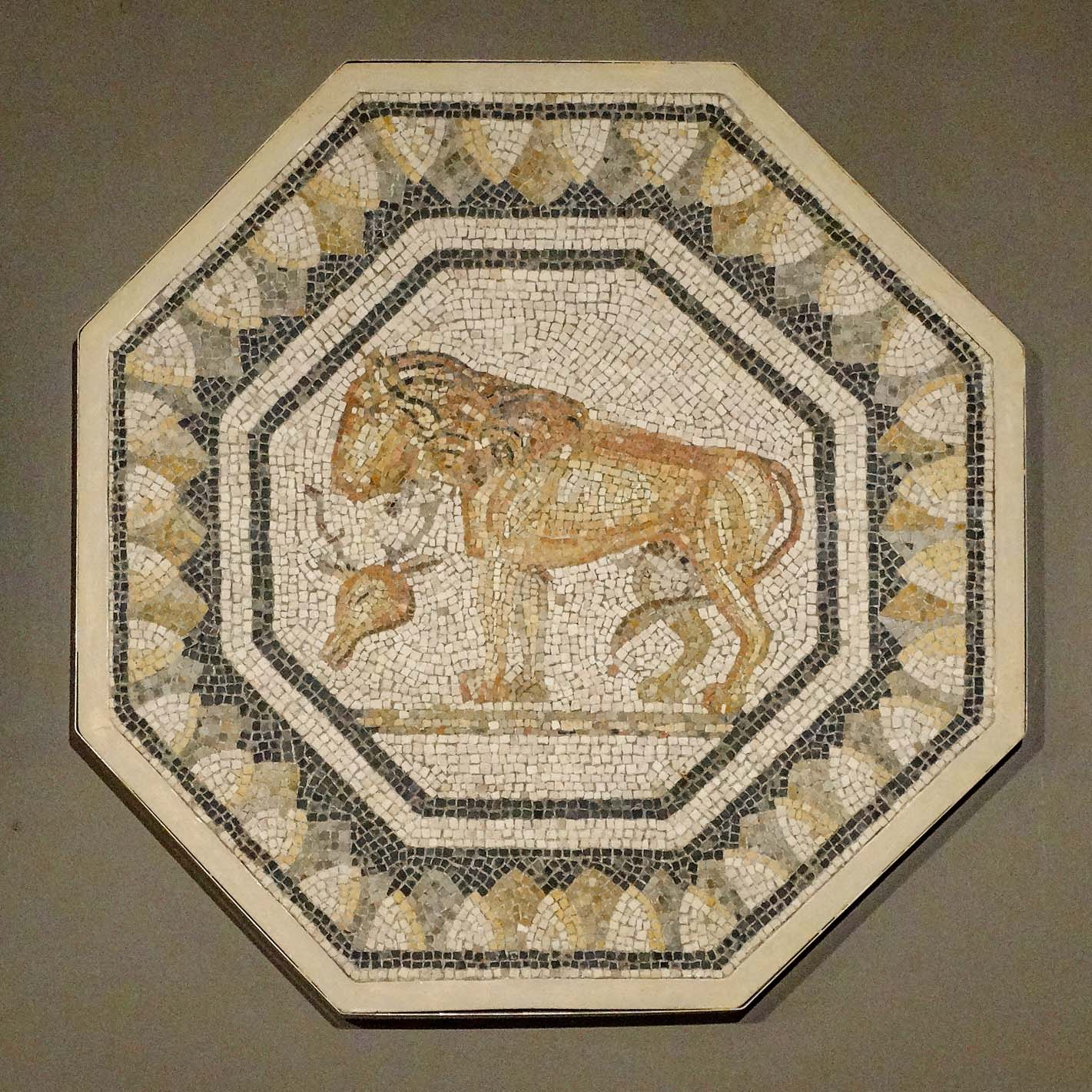
One of the medallions of the mosaic of the Triton

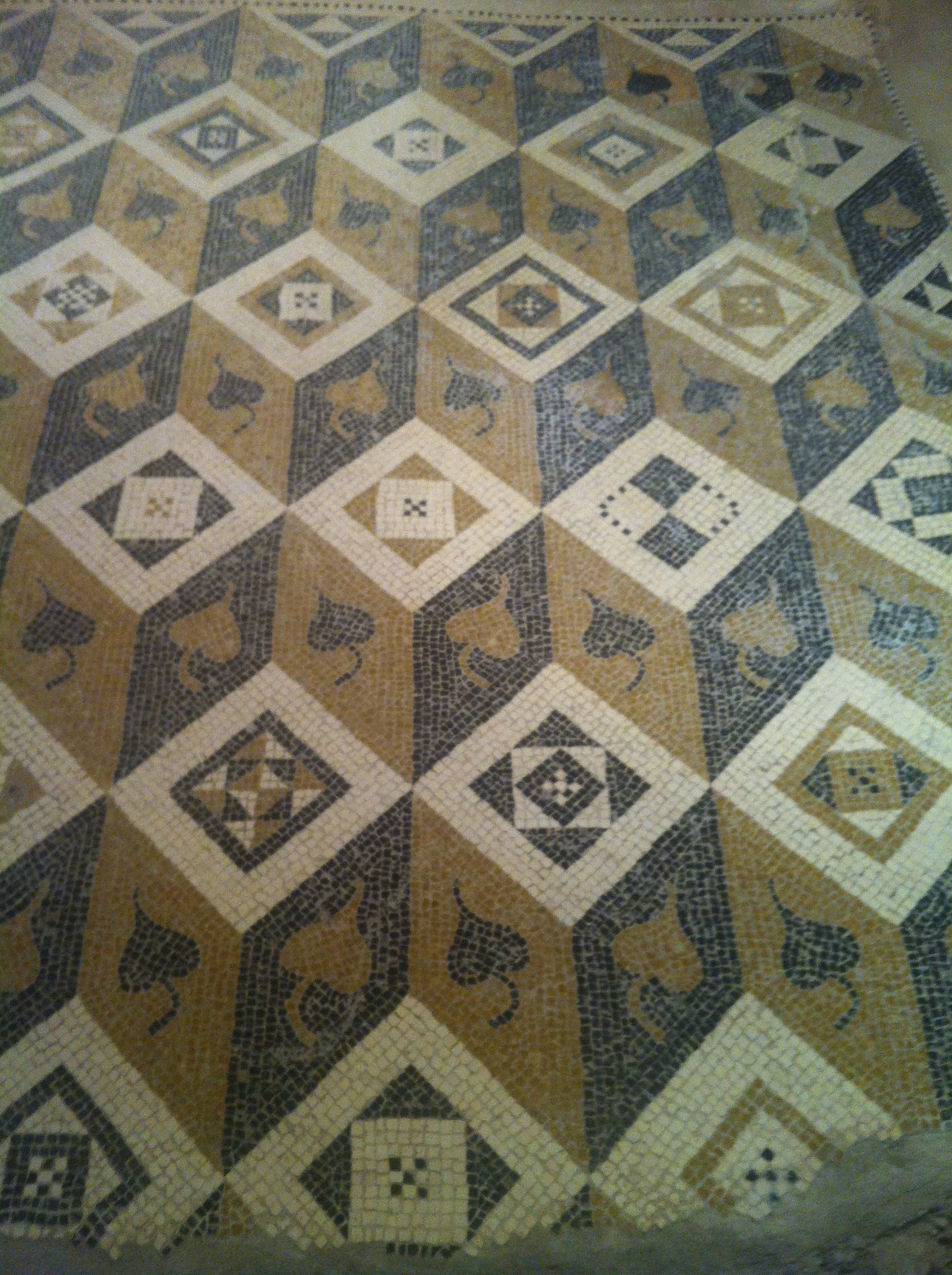
Detail of the mosaic of squares and diamonds

== Bibliography ==
- Albert Naef [in French] (1905). Les mosaïques de Boscéaz près Orbe. Imprimerie L. Vincent.
- Samuel Walter Poget; Louis Decollogny; Maurice Barbey (1929). Urba: mosaïques et vestiges romains de Boscéaz, près Orbe. Orbe: Éditions Velay.
- Samuel Walter Poget (1932). Le milliaire romain de Boscéaz près Orbe. Éditions Velay.
- von Gonzenbach Victorine, Les mosaïques romaines d'Orbe, Société suisse de Préhistoire et d'Archéologie, coll. " Guides archéologiques de la Suisse ", 1974
- Laurent Flutsch [in French] (1997). La villa gallo-romaine d'Orbe-Boscéaz et ses mosaïques. Guides archéologiques de la Suisse (in French). Fondation Pro Urba.
- Sophie Delbarre-Bärtschi, Les mosaïques romaines en Suisse, Basel, 2014, 256 p. ISBN 978-3-908006-45-9
- Dubois Yves, Urba II., Ornementation et discours architectural de la villa romaine d'Orbe-Boscéaz, Lausanne, Cahiers d'Archéologie Romande 163–165, 2016
- Luginbhül Thierry et al., Vie de palais et travail d'esclaves, La villa romaine d'Orbe-Boscéaz, Lausanne, 2001, 120 p. (document available in pdf on this page )
- Paunier Daniel, Luginbhül Thierry et alii, Urba I. La villa romaine d'Orbe-Boscéaz, Genèse et devenir d'un grand domaine rural, Lausanne, Cahiers d'Archéologie Romande 161–162, 2016
