= Edmond Davall =

Swiss forester and politician

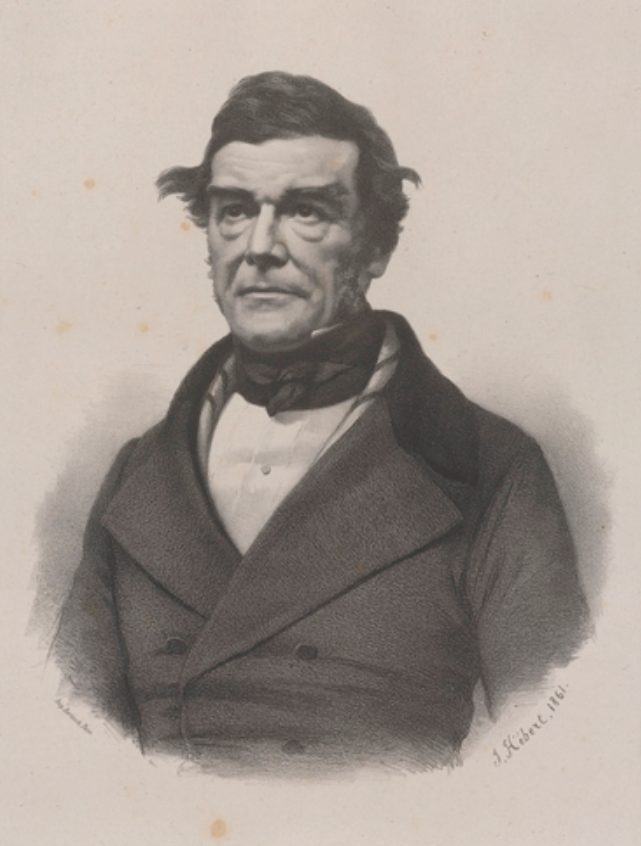
Portrait by Jules Hébert, 1861

Edmond Davall (25 March 1793 - 18 December 1860) was a Swiss forester and politician.

== Biography ==
Davall was born on 25 March 1793 in Orbe, Vaud, the son of Edmund Davall, an English-born Swiss botanist, and Henriette Crinsoz de Cottens. Davall studied forestry in Germany, graduating in 1816. He married Louise de Joffrey in 1820. Davall distinguished himself as a planner, working in Orbe, Lausanne and Moudon, and played a decisive role in the drafting of Vaud's Forestry Law of 1835.

Davall placed professionals in charge of the districts and published several articles. He was a founding member of the Vaudois Society of Foresters, vice-president of the cantonal forestry commission, and served as a Liberal member of the Grand Council of Vaud from 1843 to 1845. Davall was also a judge at the Vevey district court and a colonel of the Swiss Army artillery. He died on 18 December 1860 in Lausanne, aged 67.
