= Suchy =

- Municipality
- Flag Coat of arms
- Location of Suchy
- Location within Switzerland Location within Canton of Vaud
- Coordinates: 46°43′N 6°36′E
- Country: Switzerland
- Canton: Vaud
- District: Jura-Nord Vaudois

Government
  - Mayor: Syndic

Area
  - Total: 6.66 km^{2} (2.57 sq mi)
- Elevation: 581 m (1,906 ft)

Population (2003)
  - Total: 346
  - Density: 52.0/km^{2} (135/sq mi)
- Time zone: UTC+01:00 (CET)
  - Summer (DST): UTC+02:00 (CEST)
- Postal code: 1433
- SFOS number: 5929
- ISO 3166 code: CH-VD
- Surrounded by: Belmont-sur-Yverdon, Chavornay, Corcelles-sur-Chavornay, Épendes, Essert-Pittet, Essertines-sur-Yverdon
- Website: http://www.suchy.ch

Suchy is a municipality in the district of Jura-Nord Vaudois of the canton of Vaud in Switzerland.

== History ==
Suchy is first mentioned in 885 as Solpiaco id est Suzchie.

== Geography ==
Suchy has an area, as of 2009, of 6.7 square kilometers (2.6 mi^{2}). Of this area, 3.97 km^{2} (1.53 mi^{2}) or 59.6% is used for agricultural purposes, while 2.48 km^{2} (0.96 mi^{2}) or 37.2% is forested. Of the rest of the land, 0.23 km^{2} (0.089 mi^{2}) or 3.5% is settled (buildings or roads).

Of the built up area, housing and buildings made up 1.5% and transportation infrastructure made up 1.2%. Out of the forested land, all of the forested land area is covered with heavy forests. Of the agricultural land, 50.0% is used for growing crops and 8.7% is pastures.

The municipality was part of the Yverdon District until it was dissolved on 31 August 2006, and Suchy became part of the new district of Jura-Nord Vaudois.

== Coat of arms ==
The blazon of the municipal coat of arms is Per pale Argent and Azure, two Keys in saltire counterchanged.

== Demographics ==
Suchy has a population (as of December 2020) of 655. As of 2008, 10.2% of the population are resident foreign nationals. Over the last 10 years (1999–2009 ) the population has changed at a rate of 25.1%. It has changed at a rate of 18.6% due to migration and at a rate of 6% due to births and deaths.

Most of the population (as of 2000) speaks French (316 or 91.6%) as their first language, with German being second most common (19 or 5.5%) and Portuguese being third (6 or 1.7%).

The age distribution, as of 2009, in Suchy is; 63 children or 15.1% of the population are between 0 and 9 years old and 51 teenagers or 12.2% are between 10 and 19. Of the adult population, 39 people or 9.4% of the population are between 20 and 29 years old. 81 people or 19.4% are between 30 and 39, 65 people or 15.6% are between 40 and 49, and 50 people or 12.0% are between 50 and 59. The senior population distribution is 33 people or 7.9% of the population are between 60 and 69 years old, 22 people or 5.3% are between 70 and 79, there are 10 people or 2.4% who are between 80 and 89, and there are 3 people or 0.7% who are 90 and older.

As of 2000, there were 140 people who were single and never married in the municipality. There were 176 married individuals, 18 widows or widowers and 11 individuals who are divorced.

As of 2000, there were 125 private households in the municipality, and an average of 2.7 persons per household. There were 35 households that consist of only one person and 10 households with five or more people. Out of a total of 130 households that answered this question, 26.9% were households made up of just one person. Of the rest of the households, there are 27 married couples without children, 55 married couples with children There were 5 single parents with a child or children. There were 3 households that were made up of unrelated people and 5 households that were made up of some sort of institution or another collective housing.

In 2000 there were 48 single family homes (or 52.2% of the total) out of a total of 92 inhabited buildings. There were 15 multi-family buildings (16.3%), along with 23 multi-purpose buildings that were mostly used for housing (25.0%) and 6 other use buildings (commercial or industrial) that also had some housing (6.5%).

In 2000, a total of 117 apartments (85.4% of the total) were permanently occupied, while 17 apartments (12.4%) were seasonally occupied and 3 apartments (2.2%) were empty. As of 2009, the construction rate of new housing units was 9.6 new units per 1000 residents. The vacancy rate for the municipality, in 2010, was 1.92%.

The historical population is given in the following chart:

== Politics ==
In the 2007 federal election the most popular party was the SVP which received 25.48% of the vote. The next three most popular parties were the SP (20.62%), the FDP (14.29%) and the LPS Party (10.83%). In the federal election, a total of 110 votes were cast, and the voter turnout was 42.1%.

== Economy ==
As of 2010, Suchy had an unemployment rate of 3.2%. As of 2008, there were 31 people employed in the primary economic sector and about 14 businesses involved in this sector. 29 people were employed in the secondary sector and there were 7 businesses in this sector. 18 people were employed in the tertiary sector, with 12 businesses in this sector. There were 189 residents of the municipality who were employed in some capacity, of which females made up 42.9% of the workforce.

In 2008 the total number of full-time equivalent jobs was 61. The number of jobs in the primary sector was 21, all of which were in agriculture. The number of jobs in the secondary sector was 27 of which 9 or (33.3%) were in manufacturing and 18 (66.7%) were in construction. The number of jobs in the tertiary sector was 13. In the tertiary sector; 6 or 46.2% were in wholesale or retail sales or the repair of motor vehicles, 1 was in the movement and storage of goods, 1 was in a hotel or restaurant, 2 or 15.4% were in education.

In 2000, there were 12 workers who commuted into the municipality and 120 workers who commuted away. The municipality is a net exporter of workers, with about 10.0 workers leaving the municipality for every one entering. Of the working population, 5.3% used public transportation to get to work, and 59.3% used a private car.

== Religion ==
From the 2000 census, 65 or 18.8% were Roman Catholic, while 228 or 66.1% belonged to the Swiss Reformed Church. Of the rest of the population, there was 1 member of an Orthodox church, there was 1 individual who belongs to the Christian Catholic Church, and there were 12 individuals (or about 3.48% of the population) who belonged to another Christian church. 35 (or about 10.14% of the population) belonged to no church, are agnostic or atheist, and 9 individuals (or about 2.61% of the population) did not answer the question.

== Education ==
In Suchy about 144 or (41.7%) of the population have completed non-mandatory upper secondary education, and 40 or (11.6%) have completed additional higher education (either university or a Fachhochschule). Of the 40 who completed tertiary schooling, 72.5% were Swiss men, 25.0% were Swiss women.

In the 2009/2010 school year there were a total of 67 students in the Suchy school district. In the Vaud cantonal school system, two years of non-obligatory pre-school are provided by the political districts. During the school year, the political district provided pre-school care for a total of 578 children of which 359 children (62.1%) received subsidized pre-school care. The canton's primary school program requires students to attend for four years. There were 39 students in the municipal primary school program. The obligatory lower secondary school program lasts for six years and there were 28 students in those schools.

As of 2000, there were 2 students in Suchy who came from another municipality, while 63 residents attended schools outside the municipality.
