= Edmund Davall =

Edmund Davall (24 November 1762 in London – 26 September 1798 in Orbe) was a Swiss-English botanist.

== Life ==
He was born in England. His parents were Edmund Davall (1737-1784) and Charlotte Thomasset (1728-1788) both of Swiss origin.. He returned with her to Switzerland on the death of his father in 1788, and took up residence at Orbe, Canton de Vaud.

Upon his arrival in Orbe, Edmund created a botanical garden, which he took care of personally. In 1787, he discovered different plants with Albrecht von Haller (1758-1823), which is classified in the nomenclature of Jean Louis Antoine Reynier (1762-1824). It is his neighbor Charles Victor de Bonstetten (1745-1832), the last bailiff of Nyon and member of the Groupe de Coppet, who encouraged him to get in touch with Jakob Samuel Wyttenbach (1748-1830), pastor and naturalist. He is also related to Jean Senebier (1742-1809), pastor, botanist and librarian of Geneva, La Chenal and the great naturalist Horace Benedict de Saussure (1740-1799), who came to visit him in Orbe. Saussure cites Davall in his Travels in the Alps published in Neuchâtel in 1796.

Davall became interested in botany, making the acquaintance of Edward Forster and of James Edward Smith, and becoming one of the original fellows of the Linnean Society. He died on 26 Sept. 1798, leaving an unfinished work on the Swiss Flora, and his name was perpetuated in the genus of ferns Davallia by his correspondent Smith.

== Family ==
In November 1789, Davall married a Swiss woman named De Cottens, by whom he had a daughter, who died in infancy, and a son, Edmond (born 25 March 1793), a botanist and politician.

== Sources ==
- Richie Krishna Fergus, Edmund Davall, 2012, ISBN 9786201640771

== Notes ==
Attribution

This article incorporates text from a publication now in the public domain: Stephen, Leslie, ed. (1888). "Davall, Edmund". Dictionary of National Biography. Vol. 14. London: Smith, Elder & Co.
