= Thomas Davall =

Thomas Davall may refer to:

- Sir Thomas Davall (senior) (1644–1712), MP for Harwich 1695–1708
- Sir Thomas Davall (1682–1714), his son, MP for Harwich 1713–14
