= Épendes, Vaud =

Épendes
- Municipality
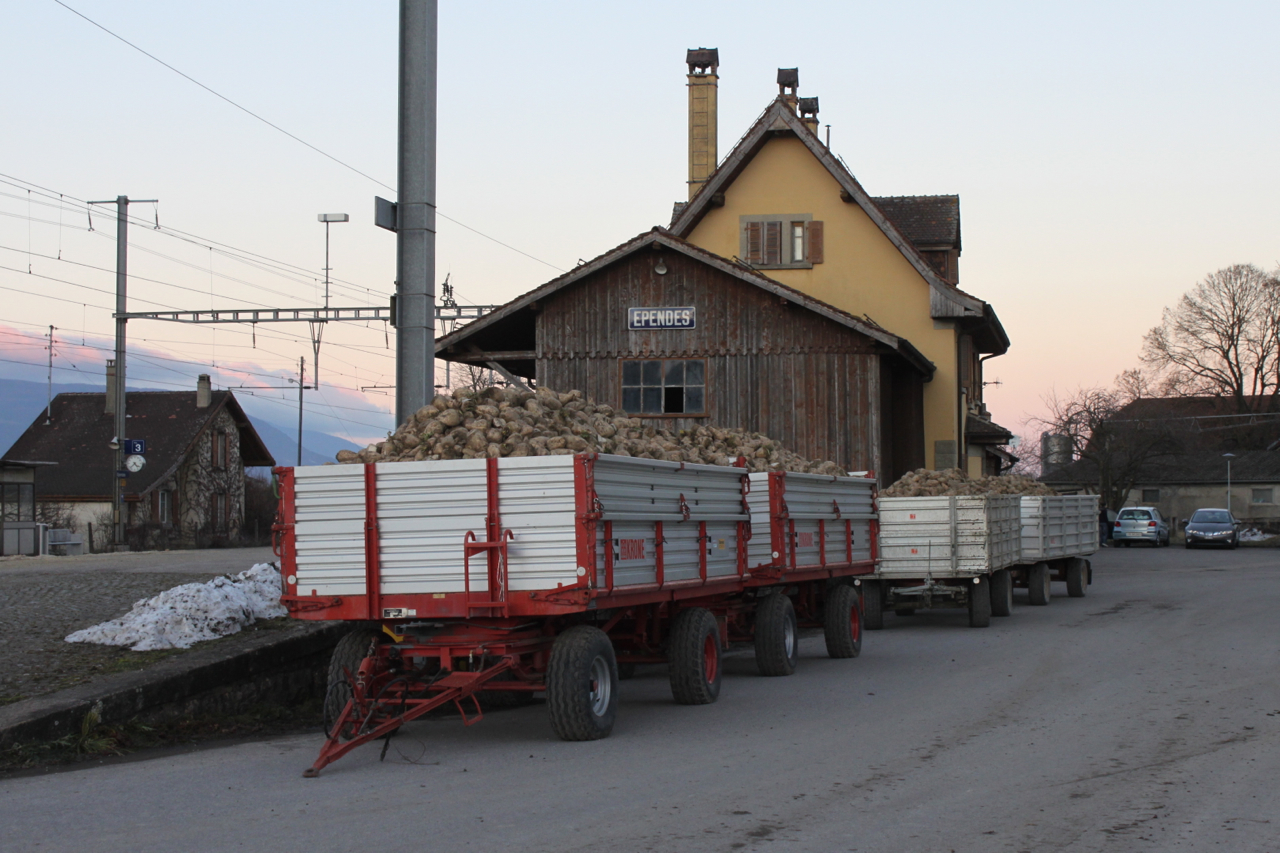

- Flag Coat of arms
- Location of Épendes
- Location within Switzerland Location within Canton of Vaud
- Coordinates: 46°45′N 6°36′E
- Country: Switzerland
- Canton: Vaud
- District: Jura-Nord Vaudois

Government
  - Mayor: Syndic

Area
  - Total: 4.82 km^{2} (1.86 sq mi)
- Elevation: 447 m (1,467 ft)

Population (2003)
  - Total: 315
  - Density: 65.4/km^{2} (169/sq mi)
- Time zone: UTC+01:00 (CET)
  - Summer (DST): UTC+02:00 (CEST)
- Postal code: 1434
- SFOS number: 5914
- ISO 3166 code: CH-VD
- Surrounded by: Belmont-sur-Yverdon, Essert-Pittet, Mathod, Orbe, Suchy, Suscévaz, Treycovagnes, Yverdon-les-Bains
- Website: https://www.ependesvd.ch Profile (in French), SFSO statistics

Épendes is a municipality in the district of Jura-Nord Vaudois of the canton of Vaud in Switzerland.

== History ==
Épendes is first mentioned in 1154 as Spinles. In 1174 it was mentioned as Espinnes. The municipality is the site of the Château d'Épendes and the Observatory of Épendes, which is open to the public.

== Geography ==
Épendes has an area, as of 2009, of 4.8 square kilometers (1.9 mi^{2}). Of this area, 3.62 km^{2} (1.40 mi^{2}) or 74.9% is used for agricultural purposes, while 0.66 km^{2} (0.25 mi^{2}) or 13.7% is forested. Of the rest of the land, 0.45 km^{2} (0.17 mi^{2}) or 9.3% is settled (buildings or roads), 0.1 km^{2} (25 acres) or 2.1% is either rivers or lakes.

Of the built up area, housing and buildings made up 2.5% and transportation infrastructure made up 6.2%. Out of the forested land, all of the forested land area is covered with heavy forests. Of the agricultural land, 66.0% is used for growing crops and 7.5% is pastures, while 1.4% is used for orchards or vine crops. All the water in the municipality is flowing water.

The municipality was part of the Yverdon District until it was dissolved on 31 August 2006, and Épendes became part of the new district of Jura-Nord Vaudois.

== Coat of arms ==
The blazon of the municipal coat of arms is Gules a Barrulett Or, overall a Reed Vert fructed Sable between two Frogs Vert in base.

== Demographics ==
Épendes has a population (as of December 2020) of 389. As of 2008, 11.1% of the population are resident foreign nationals. Over the last 10 years (1999–2009 ) the population has changed at a rate of 8.2%. It has changed at a rate of -3.1% due to migration and at a rate of 11.3% due to births and deaths.

Most of the population (as of 2000) speaks French (288 or 90.0%) as their first language, with Portuguese being second most common (10 or 3.1%) and German being third (9 or 2.8%).

The age distribution, as of 2009, in Épendes is; 43 children or 13.6% of the population are between 0 and 9 years old and 35 teenagers or 11.0% are between 10 and 19. Of the adult population, 40 people or 12.6% of the population are between 20 and 29 years old. 48 people or 15.1% are between 30 and 39, 46 people or 14.5% are between 40 and 49, and 43 people or 13.6% are between 50 and 59. The senior population distribution is 44 people or 13.9% of the population are between 60 and 69 years old, 13 people or 4.1% are between 70 and 79, there are 4 people or 1.3% who are between 80 and 89, and there is 1 person who is 90 and older.

As of 2000, there were 139 people who were single and never married in the municipality. There were 145 married individuals, 14 widows or widowers and 22 individuals who are divorced.

As of 2000, there were 132 private households in the municipality, and an average of 2.4 persons per household. There were 38 households that consist of only one person and 9 households with five or more people. Out of a total of 135 households that answered this question, 28.1% were households made up of just one person and there was 1 adult who lived with their parents. Of the rest of the households, there are 39 married couples without children, 46 married couples with children There were 6 single parents with a child or children. There were 2 households that were made up of unrelated people and 3 households that were made up of some sort of institution or another collective housing.

In 2000 there were 42 single family homes (or 50.6% of the total) out of a total of 83 inhabited buildings. There were 23 multi-family buildings (27.7%), along with 11 multi-purpose buildings that were mostly used for housing (13.3%) and 7 other use buildings (commercial or industrial) that also had some housing (8.4%).

In 2000, a total of 130 apartments (86.1% of the total) were permanently occupied, while 15 apartments (9.9%) were seasonally occupied and 6 apartments (4.0%) were empty. As of 2009, the construction rate of new housing units was 0 new units per 1000 residents. The vacancy rate for the municipality, in 2010, was 0%.

The historical population is given in the following chart:

== Politics ==
In the 2007 federal election the most popular party was the SVP which received 31.34% of the vote. The next three most popular parties were the SP (19.58%), the FDP (18.63%) and the Green Party (11.93%). In the federal election, a total of 106 votes were cast, and the voter turnout was 46.9%.

== Economy ==
As of 2010, Épendes had an unemployment rate of 2.1%. As of 2008, there were 20 people employed in the primary economic sector and about 9 businesses involved in this sector. 15 people were employed in the secondary sector and there were 4 businesses in this sector. 12 people were employed in the tertiary sector, with 7 businesses in this sector. There were 183 residents of the municipality who were employed in some capacity, of which females made up 42.1% of the workforce.

In 2008 the total number of full-time equivalent jobs was 36. The number of jobs in the primary sector was 15, all of which were in agriculture. The number of jobs in the secondary sector was 13 of which 11 or (84.6%) were in manufacturing and 2 (15.4%) were in construction. The number of jobs in the tertiary sector was 8. In the tertiary sector; 3 or 37.5% were in wholesale or retail sales or the repair of motor vehicles, 1 was in the movement and storage of goods, 2 or 25.0% were in a hotel or restaurant, 2 or 25.0% were in education.

In 2000, there were 15 workers who commuted into the municipality and 136 workers who commuted away. The municipality is a net exporter of workers, with about 9.1 workers leaving the municipality for every one entering. Of the working population, 9.8% used public transportation to get to work, and 66.1% used a private car.

== Religion ==
From the 2000 census, 67 or 20.9% were Roman Catholic, while 197 or 61.6% belonged to the Swiss Reformed Church. Of the rest of the population, there were 2 members of an Orthodox church (or about 0.63% of the population), and there was 1 individual who belongs to another Christian church. There were 10 (or about 3.13% of the population) who were Islamic. There were 1 individual who belonged to another church. 37 (or about 11.56% of the population) belonged to no church, are agnostic or atheist, and 5 individuals (or about 1.56% of the population) did not answer the question.

== Education ==
In Épendes about 128 or (40.0%) of the population have completed non-mandatory upper secondary education, and 40 or (12.5%) have completed additional higher education (either university or a Fachhochschule). Of the 40 who completed tertiary schooling, 60.0% were Swiss men, 27.5% were Swiss women.

In the 2009/2010 school year there were a total of 44 students in the Épendes (VD) school district. In the Vaud cantonal school system, two years of non-obligatory pre-school are provided by the political districts. During the school year, the political district provided pre-school care for a total of 578 children of which 359 children (62.1%) received subsidized pre-school care. The canton's primary school program requires students to attend for four years. There were 25 students in the municipal primary school program. The obligatory lower secondary school program lasts for six years and there were 19 students in those schools.

As of 2000, there were 13 students in Épendes who came from another municipality, while 44 residents attended schools outside the municipality.

== Transportation ==
The municipality has a railway station, Ependes VD, on the Jura Foot line. It has regular service to Grandson, Yverdon-les-Bains, and Lausanne.
