= Orbe =

Place in Vaud, Switzerland

- Municipality
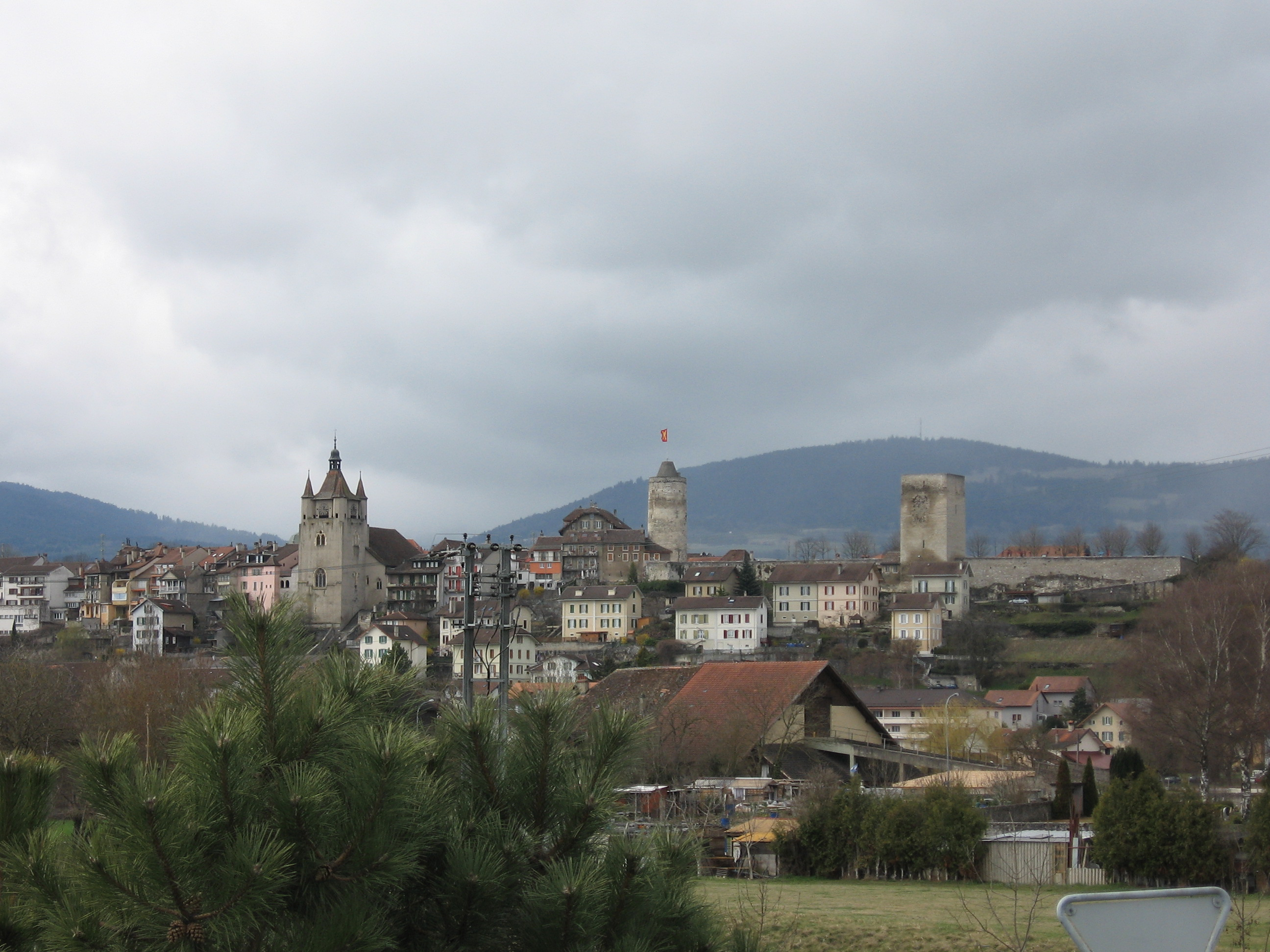
- Orbe town

- Flag Coat of arms
- Location of Orbe
- Location within Switzerland Location within Canton of Vaud
- Coordinates: 46°43′N 06°32′E
- Country: Switzerland
- Canton: Vaud
- District: Jura-Nord Vaudois

Government
  - Mayor: Syndic

Area
  - Total: 12.04 km^{2} (4.65 sq mi)
- Elevation: 479 m (1,572 ft)

Population (2003)
  - Total: 5,063
  - Density: 420.5/km^{2} (1,089/sq mi)
- Time zone: UTC+01:00 (CET)
  - Summer (DST): UTC+02:00 (CEST)
- Postal code: 1350
- SFOS number: 5757
- ISO 3166 code: CH-VD
- Surrounded by: Agiez, Arnex-sur-Orbe, Chavornay, Épendes, Essert-Pittet, Mathod, Montcherand, Valeyres-sous-Rances
- Website: www.orbe.ch

Orbe (French: [ɔʁb]; Latin: Urba; older German: Orbach, [ɔʁbax]; Arpitan: Orba) is a municipality in the Swiss canton of Vaud. It was the seat of the former district of Orbe and is now part of the district of Jura-Nord Vaudois.

== History ==
Orbe is first mentioned about 280 as Urba. In 1179, it was mentioned as versus Orbam.

=== Ancient history ===
During the Roman era, Orbe – then known as Urba – was a town of Gallia, in the territory of the Helvetii. In the Antonine Itinerary, it is placed between Lacus Lausonius and Ariolica, xviii m.p. from Lacus Lausonius and xxiiii m.p. from Ariolica.

On the Boscéaz hill are the remains of a vast and luxurious Roman villa, the large, mosaics of which are visible.

=== Middle ages ===
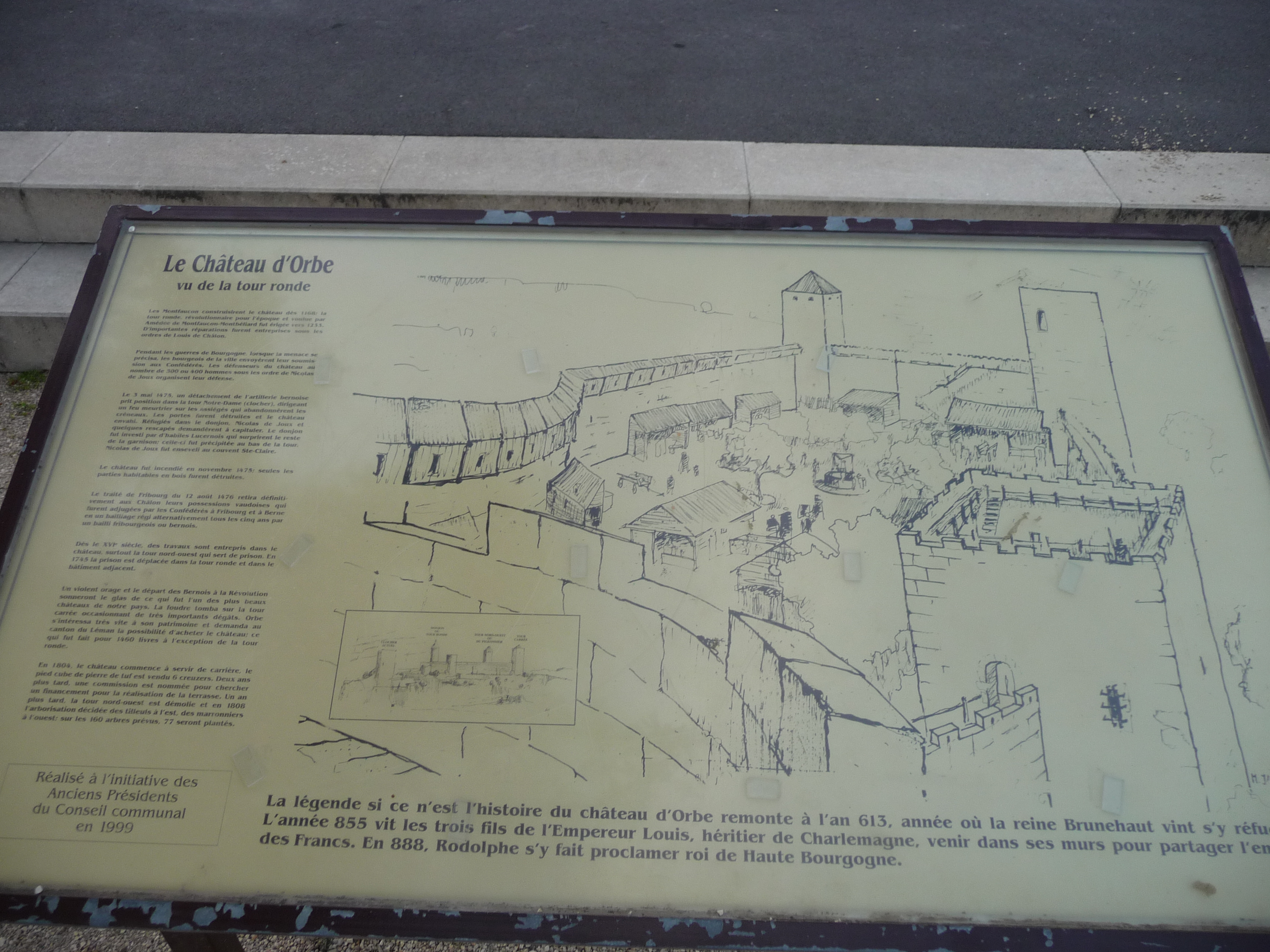
Plan of Orbe Castle

By the Middle Ages, Orbe sat on the road over the Jougne Pass and at the crossroads of two major transportation routes. One stretched from the Jura Mountains to the Alps while the other ran from the Rhine River to the Rhone River. The municipality grew up on both sides of the Orbe. On the left side was the villa Tavellis and the parish church of Saint-Germain, while the right side had the villa Tabernis with the church of Saint-Martin. At some point during the Middle Ages, a bridge was built across the river which joined the two settlements. Orbe Castle and the town's market were built on the hill above the river and the bridge.

In 888, the town was owned by the Burgundian king Rudolf I. The next records of the town come from silver coins which the town's mint produced for Conrad the peaceful between 937 and 993. The town remained part of the independent Kingdom of Burgundy until the death of the last king, Rudolf III in 1032. Before Rudolph's death, the Emperor Conrad II of the Holy Roman Empire had forced him to name Conrad as his successor. With Rudolph's death, the entire kingdom, including Orbe, was incorporated into the empire. In 1076, Emperor Henry IV replaced the Burgundian noble in Orbe with one of his vassals, Count Wilhelm II.

Land and rights in the town passed through several nobles, and in 1168, Amadeus II of Montfaucon, the count of Montbéliard, bought about half of the town of Orbe. In a record from 1183, the town's churches and much of the land were owned by Baulmes and Payerne Priories. Around the end of the 11th century, Romainmôtier Abbey acquired some land in the town, on which they built a hospital. In 1139, they expanded the building into the nearby Notre-Dame chapel.

In addition to the religious land owners, the Counts of Montfaucon-Montbeliard began to live in the town. In 1233, they built a round keep in Orbe Castle. Two years later, Amadeus III of Montfaucon-Montbeliard built the Bourg-Vieux and Bourg-Neuf to help protect the town. By fortifying the town and castle, the counts and the town were able to control the trade routes that passed through the valley.

=== Early modern and modern Orbe ===
In 1352, Orbe became a town with a town charter modeled on Moudon's. After the death of Girard de Montfaucon and of his wife, Orbe was inherited by Count Montbeliard in 1379. In 1410, it passed to Louis de Chalon, the Prince of Orange. The Chalon family held the town until it was captured by the Swiss Confederation in 1475 during the Burgundian Wars. However, the Swiss were unable to hold it and Hugh de Chalon recaptured it in the same year. In the following year, Charles the Bold met with Swiss messengers at Orbe. Due to the Swiss victory in the Burgundian Wars, the confederation acquired much of the old Burgundian land near the Jura Mountains in 1484. The de Chalon lands, including Orbe and nearby Echallens, became a joint condominium or gemeine Herrschaft which was administered by Bern and Fribourg. It remained a subject territory until the 1798 French invasion and the creation of the French-backed Helvetic Republic. Under the Helvetic Republic, Orbe became the capital of the District of Orbe. The Helvetic Republic, which espoused the ideals of the French Revolution, was very popular with the urban residents of Orbe. The reforms of the Helvetic Republic were too much for many Swiss to accept, and the republic was overthrown by the Stecklikrieg revolution. As the Helvetic government retreated in September 1802 from Bern to Lausanne, government troops briefly occupied Orbe. Under the Act of Mediation, Orbe remained the capital of its own district.

== Geography ==
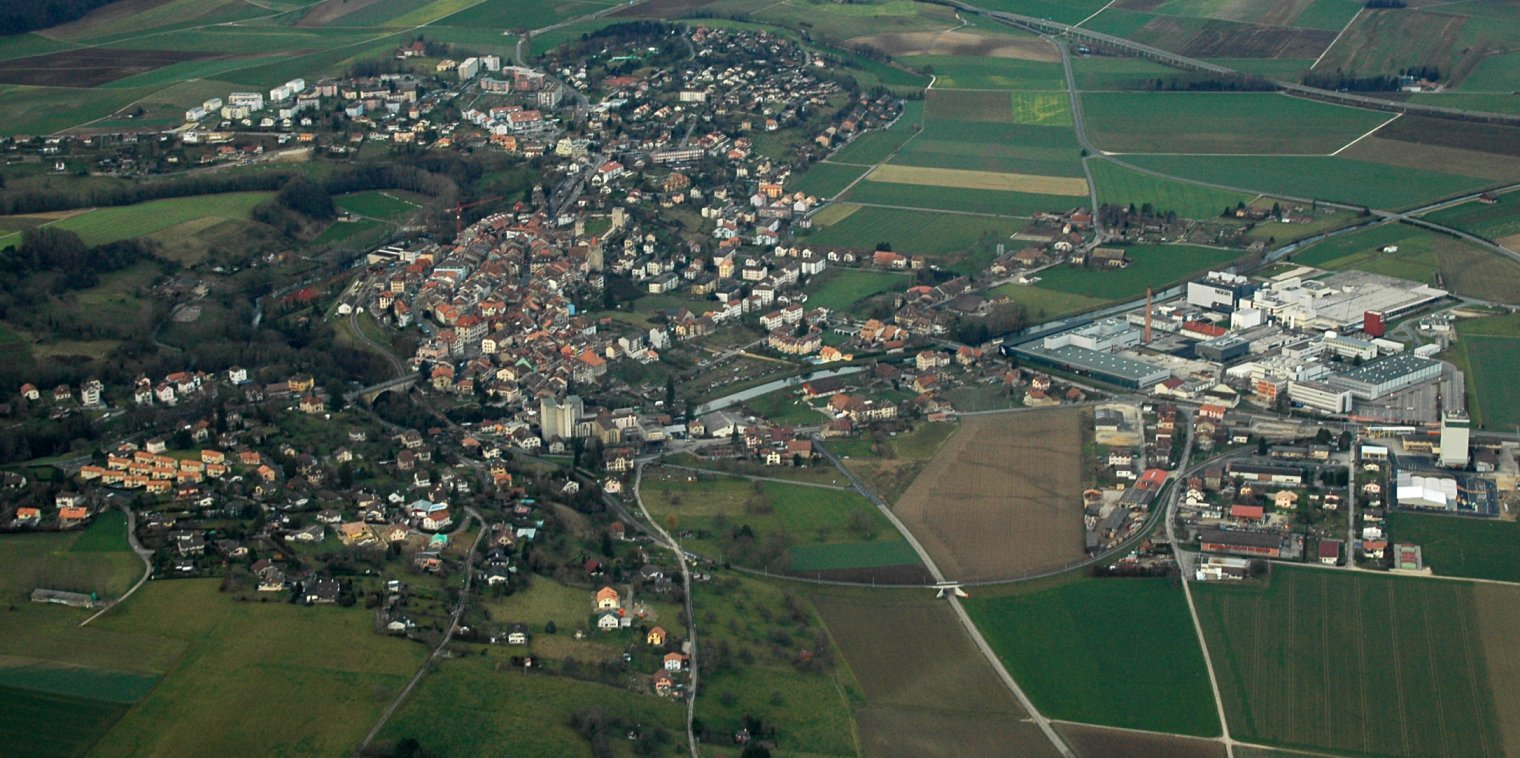
Aerial view of Orbe, showing the tree-covered Orbe river and the hill of the old town

Aerial view (1949)

Orbe has an area, as of 2009, of 12 km^{2} (4.6 mi^{2}). Of this area, 8.85 km^{2} (3.42 mi^{2}) (73.6%) are used for agricultural purposes, while 0.44 km^{2} (0.17 mi^{2}) (3.7%) is forested. Of the rest of the land, 2.36 km^{2} (0.91 mi^{2}) (19.6%) are settled (buildings or roads), and 0.35 km^{2} (0.14 mi^{2}) (2.9%) is either rivers or lakes.

Of the built-up area, industrial buildings made up 3.0% of the total area, while housing and buildings made up 8.7%, and transportation infrastructure made up 5.7%. Parks, green belts, and sports fields made up 1.7%. Of the forested land, 2.2% of the total land area is heavily forested and 1.4% is covered with orchards or small clusters of trees. Of the agricultural land, 60.7% is used for growing crops and 9.2% is pastures, while 3.7% is used for orchards or vine crops. All the water in the municipality is flowing water.

The municipality was the capital of the Orbe District until it was dissolved on 31 August 2006, and Orbe became part of the new district of Jura-Nord Vaudois.

The municipality is located on a hill partly surrounded by the Orbe River. It consists of the village of Orbe and a number of hamlets, including Granges Saint-Germain, Granges Saint-Martin, Mont Choisi, and Le Puisoir.

== Coat of arms ==
The blazon of the municipal coat of arms is Gules, two Sea-daces addorsed Or.

== Demographics ==
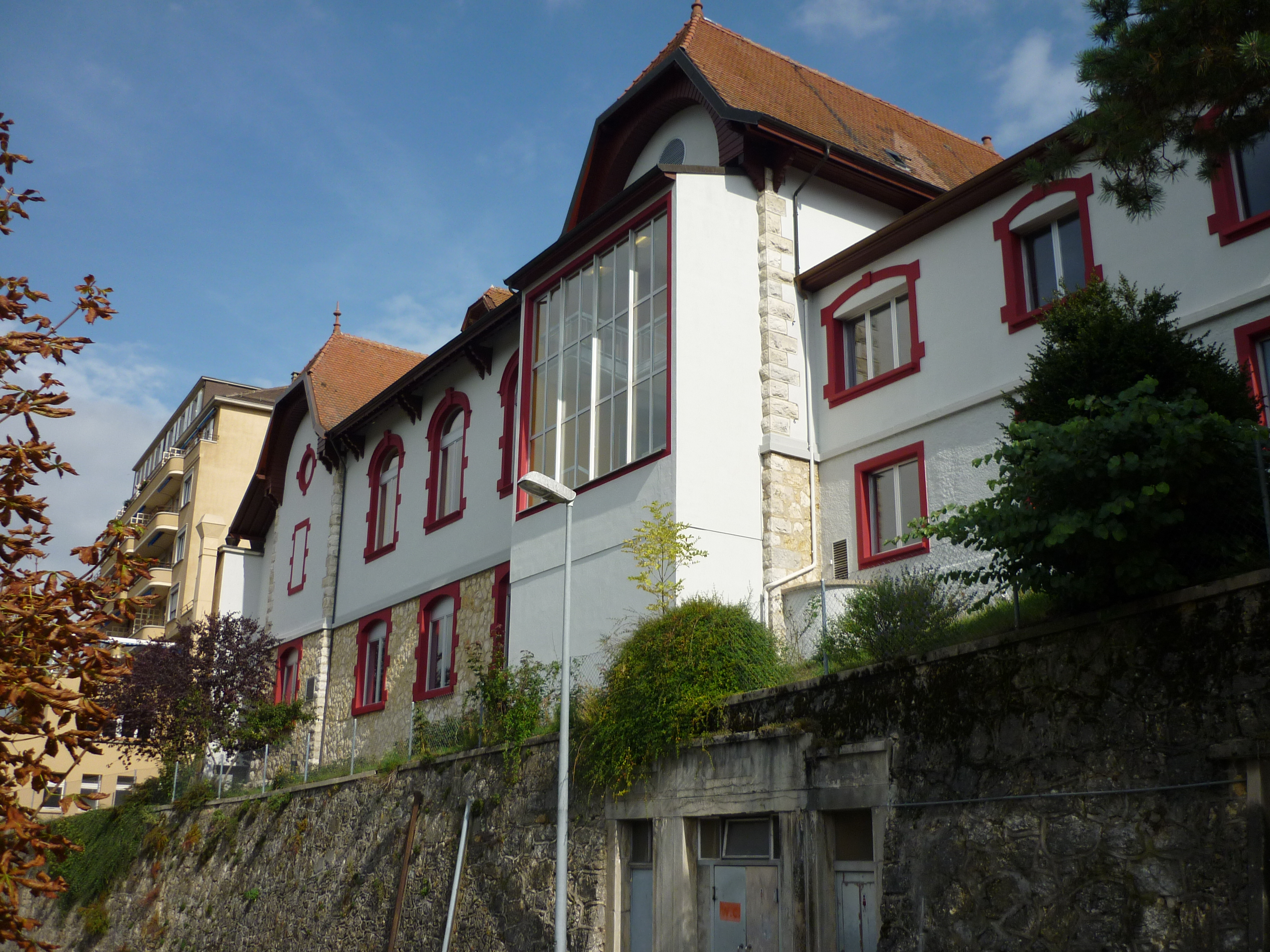
Casino Orbe

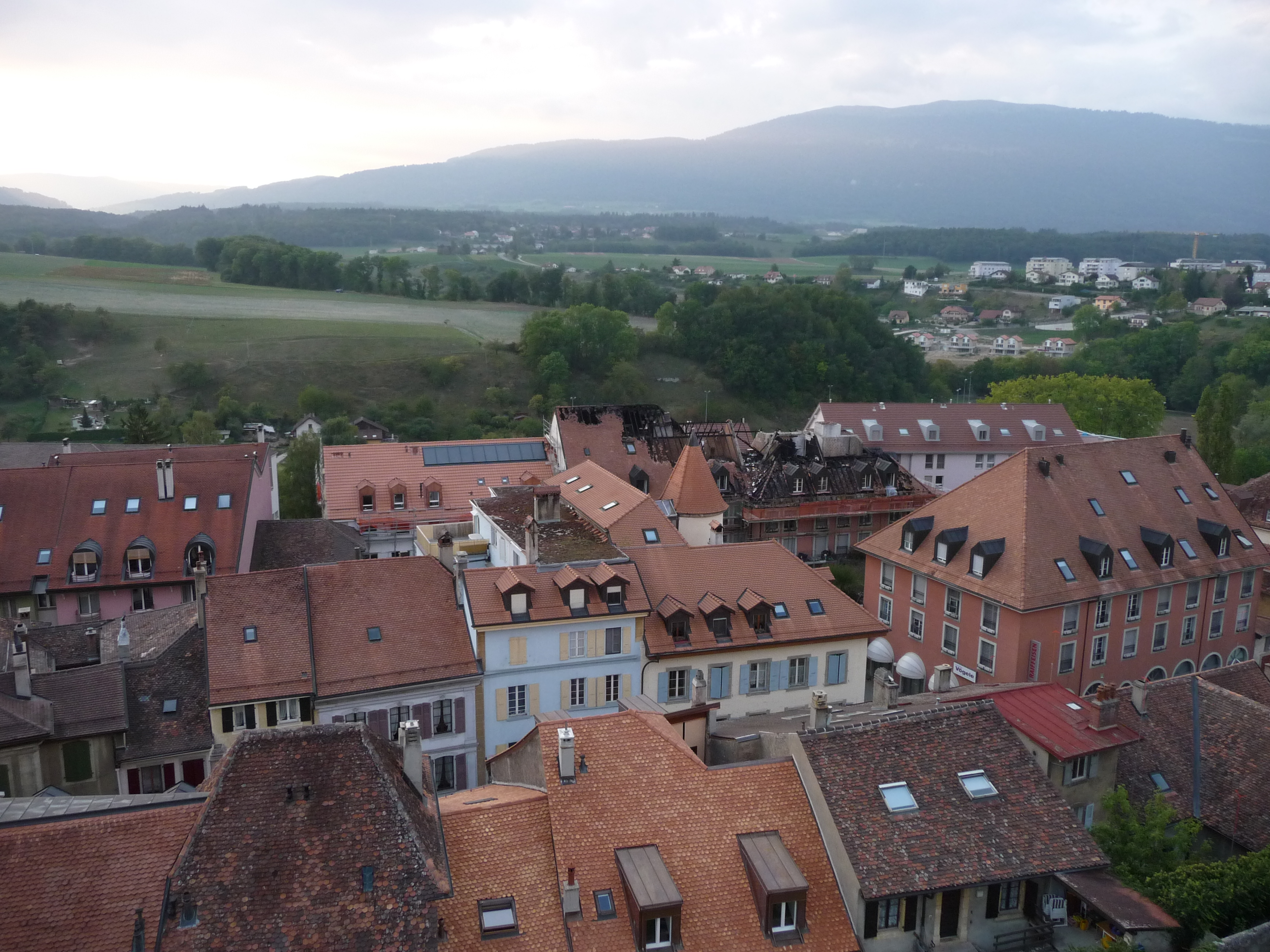
Part of the old city of Orbe

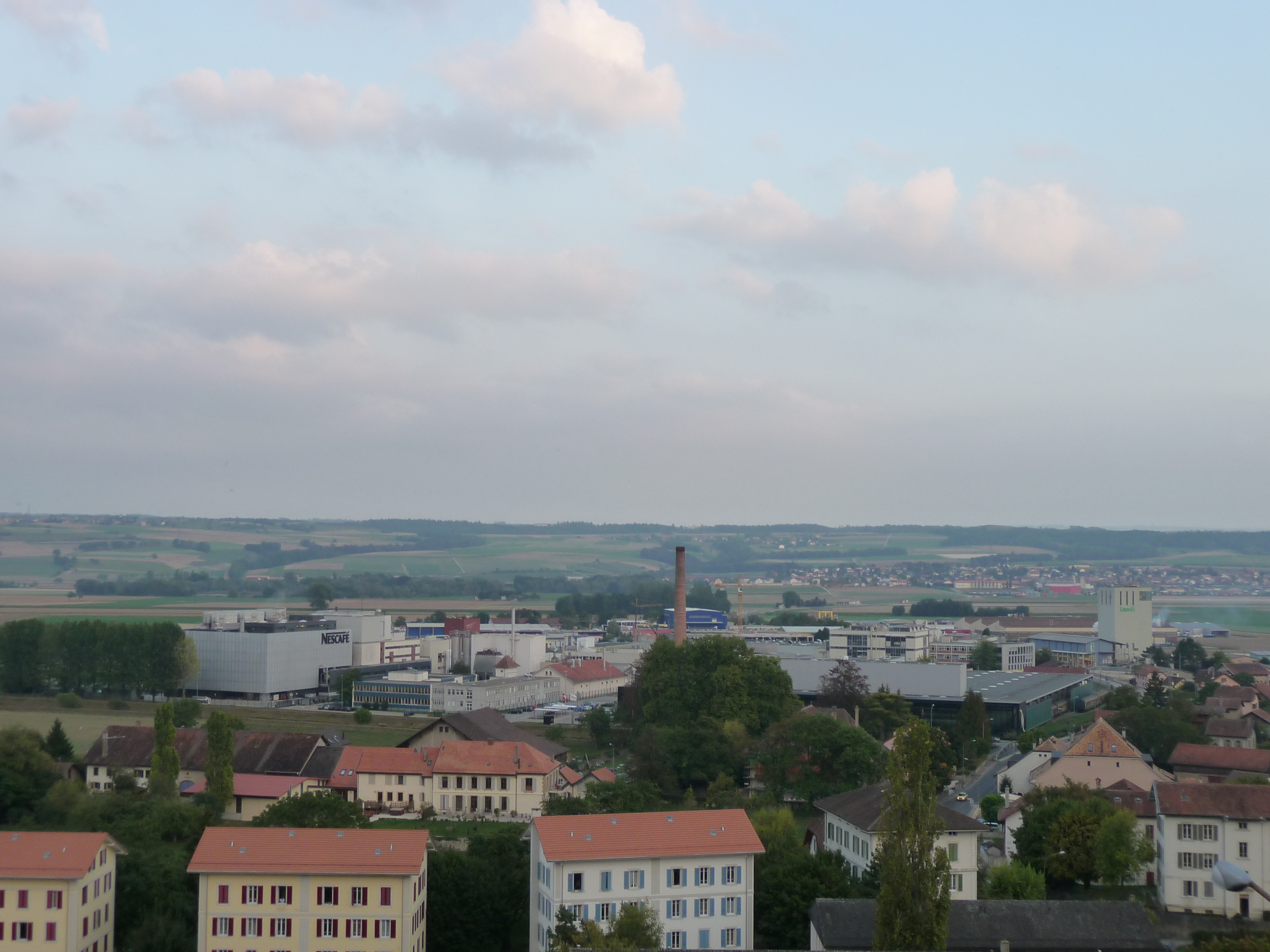
Newer buildings in Orbe

Orbe has a population (as of December 2020) of 7,108. As of 2008, 28.6% of the population is resident foreign nationals. Over the years 1999–2009, the population has changed at a rate of 25.8%, 22.1% due to migration and 4.3% due to births and deaths.

Most of the population (as of 2000) speaks French (4,229 or 82.3%), with Portuguese being second-most common (255 or 5.0%) and German being third (161 or 3.1%). There are 128 people who speak Italian and four people who speak Romansh.

The age distribution, as of 2009, in Orbe is 674 children (11.3%) up to 9 years old and 781 youth (13.1%) between 10 and 19. Of the adult population, 862 people (14.5%) are between 20 and 29 years old, 848 people (14.2%) are between 30 and 39, 920 people (15.4%) are between 40 and 49, and 754 people (12.7%) are between 50 and 59. The senior population distribution is 493 people (8.3%) between 60 and 69 years old, 378 people (6.3%) between 70 and 79, 216 people (3.6%) between 80 and 89, and 31 people (0.5%) 90 and older.

As of 2000, 2,103 people were single and never married in the municipality. There were 2,441 married individuals, 304 widows or widowers, and 291 individuals who are divorced.

As of 2000, 2,073 private households were in the municipality, and an average of 2.3 persons per household. The 687 households had only one person and 120 households had five or more people. Of a total of 2,108 households that answered this question, 32.6% were households made up of just one person and 16 were adults who lived with their parents. Of the rest of the households, 578 were married couples without children, 642 were married couples with children, and 120 were single parents with a child or children. Thirty households were made up of unrelated people and 35 households were made up of some sort of institution or another collective housing.

In 2000, 529 of a total of 968 inhabited buildings were single family homes (54.6%). There were 222 multifamily buildings (22.9%), along with 154 multipurpose buildings that were mostly used for housing (15.9%) and 63 other-use buildings (commercial or industrial) that also had some housing (6.5%).

In 2000, a total of 1,934 apartments (84.7% of the total) were permanently occupied, while 208 apartments (9.1%) were seasonally occupied, and 141 apartments (6.2%) were empty. As of 2009, the construction rate of new housing units was 5.4 new units per 1000 residents. The vacancy rate for the municipality, in 2010, was 0.18%.

The historical population is given in the following chart:

== Heritage sites of national significance ==
The Boscéaz (a Gallo-Roman villa), Orbe Castle with its two towers and plaza, the Swiss Reformed Church of Notre-Dame and the City Hall are listed as Swiss heritage site of national significance. The entire old town of Orbe is part of the Inventory of Swiss Heritage Sites.

The Gallo-Roman villa is known for its Roman mosaics, which are composed of several hundreds of pieces on the floor of the original site. The villa was a palace belonging to a rich but unknown landowner. It was built around AD 160 and abandoned about 270. Nowadays, eight mosaics are still visible and can be visited. A ninth mosaic, discovered in 1993, is being restored and it is not open for public visits.

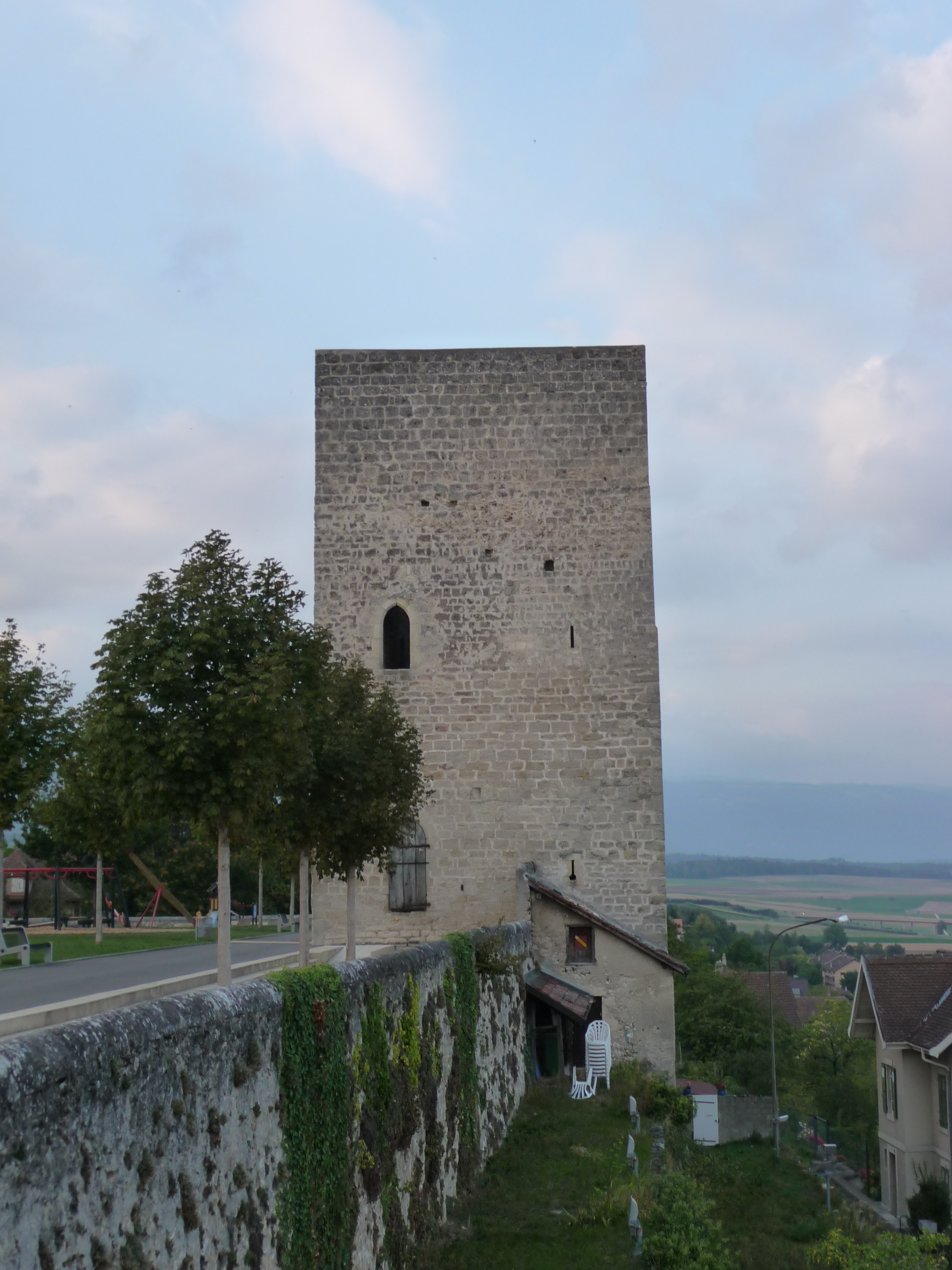
Orbe Castle

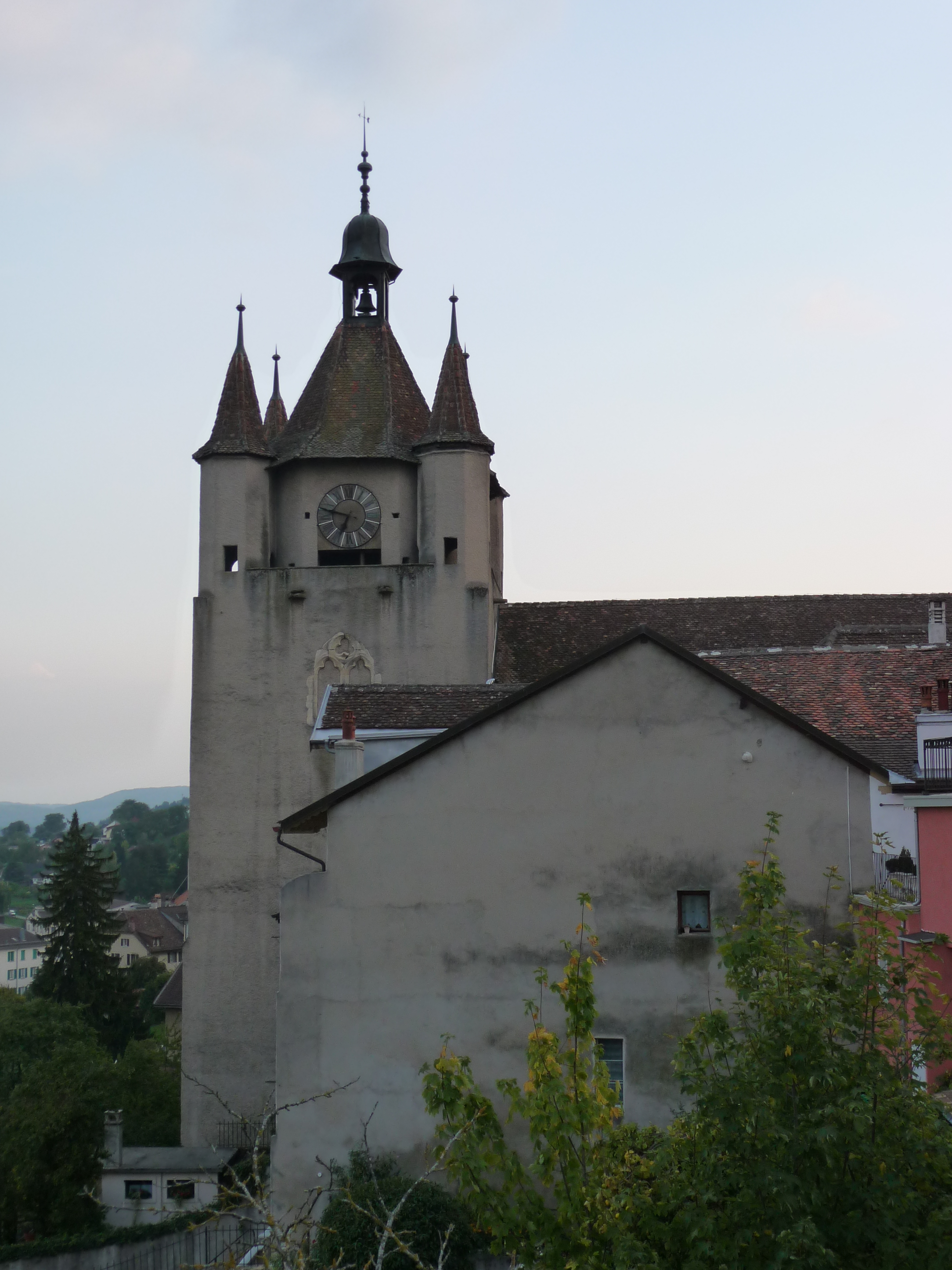
Swiss Reformed Church of Notre-Dame

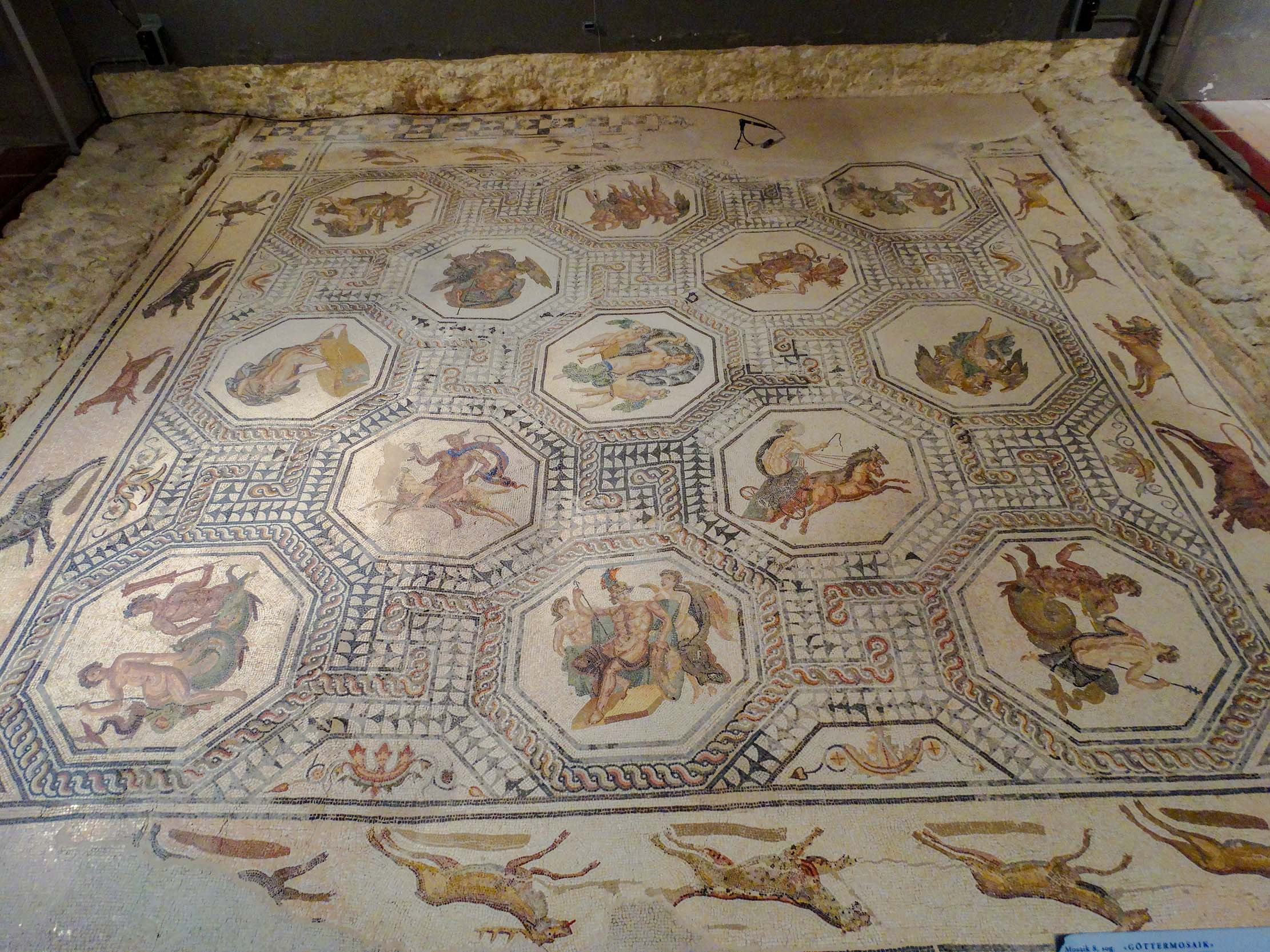
Gallo-Roman villa: Mosaic of the divinities

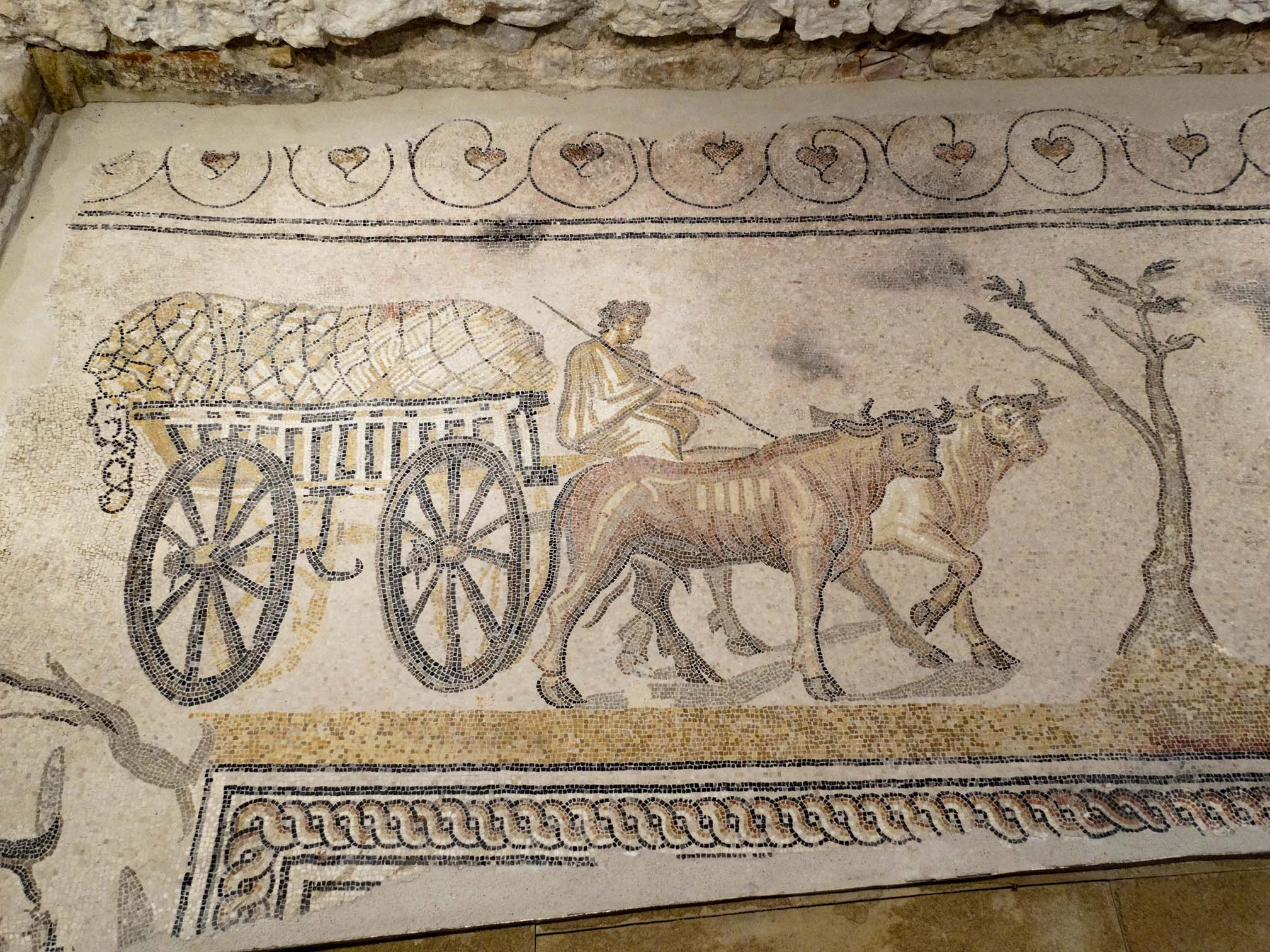
Gallo-Roman villa: mosaic of the "Cortège rustique"

== Politics ==
In the 2007 federal election, the most popular party was the SP, which received 26.68% of the vote. The next three most popular parties were the SVP (20.26%), the FDP (14.52%), and the Green Party (12.92%). In the federal election, a total of 1,107 votes were cast, and the voter turnout was 36.2%.

== Economy ==
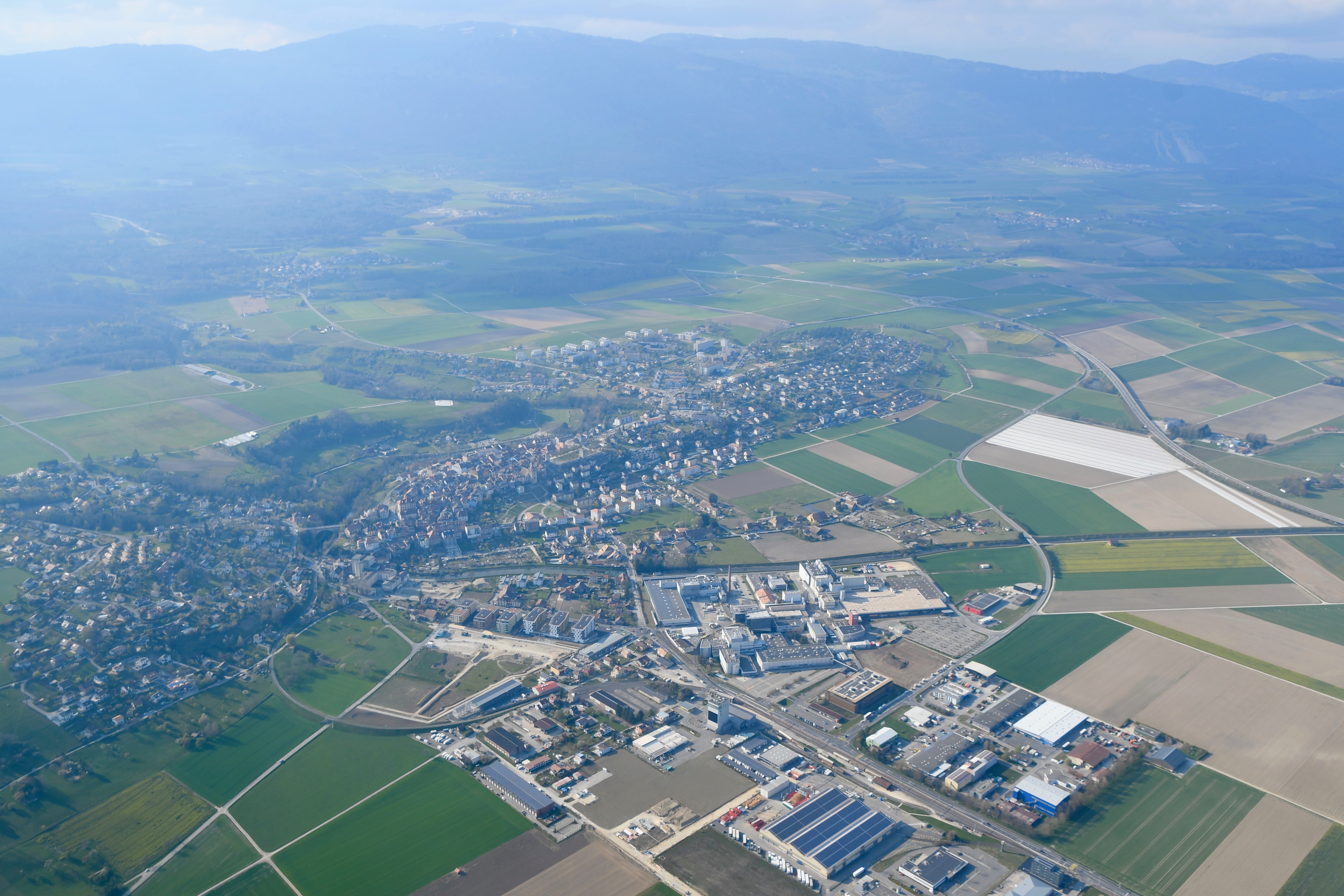
Aerial view of Orbe with the Nestlé factory complex (foreground) and the Jura Mountains (background)

The town has a Nestle Research & Development factory with a working force of over 500 employees. The factory is responsible for producing Nescafé and Nespresso. The factory accounts for just over 15% of Nestlé's overall turnover per annum. The factory was opened in 1901 by Daniel Peter, the inventor of milk chocolate, to expand his production. A 52-metre-tall chimney built for the former chocolate factory has been preserved.

As of 2010, Orbe had an unemployment rate of 7.5%. As of 2008, there were 95 people employed in the primary economic sector and about 18 businesses involved in this sector. 1,121 people were employed in the secondary sector and there were 48 businesses in this sector. 2,173 people were employed in the tertiary sector, with 227 businesses in this sector. There were 2,624 residents of the municipality who were employed in some capacity, of which females made up 38.5% of the workforce.

In 2008 the total number of full-time equivalent jobs was 2,996. The number of jobs in the primary sector was 85, all of which were in agriculture. The number of jobs in the secondary sector was 1,081 of which 807 or (74.7%) were in manufacturing and 241 (22.3%) were in construction. The number of jobs in the tertiary sector was 1,830. In the tertiary sector; 343 or 18.7% were in wholesale or retail sales or the repair of motor vehicles, 82 or 4.5% were in the movement and storage of goods, 58 or 3.2% were in a hotel or restaurant, 15 or 0.8% were in the information industry, 36 or 2.0% were the insurance or financial industry, 515 or 28.1% were technical professionals or scientists, 121 or 6.6% were in education and 257 or 14.0% were in health care.

In 2000, there were 1,832 workers who commuted into the municipality and 1,489 workers who commuted away. The municipality is a net importer of workers, with about 1.2 workers entering the municipality for every one leaving. About 7.1% of the workforce coming into Orbe are coming from outside Switzerland. Of the working population, 10.6% used public transportation to get to work, and 66.2% used a private car.

Since 1894, the town has been served by the Orbe-Chavornay railway, the first electrified railway in Switzerland.

== Religion ==
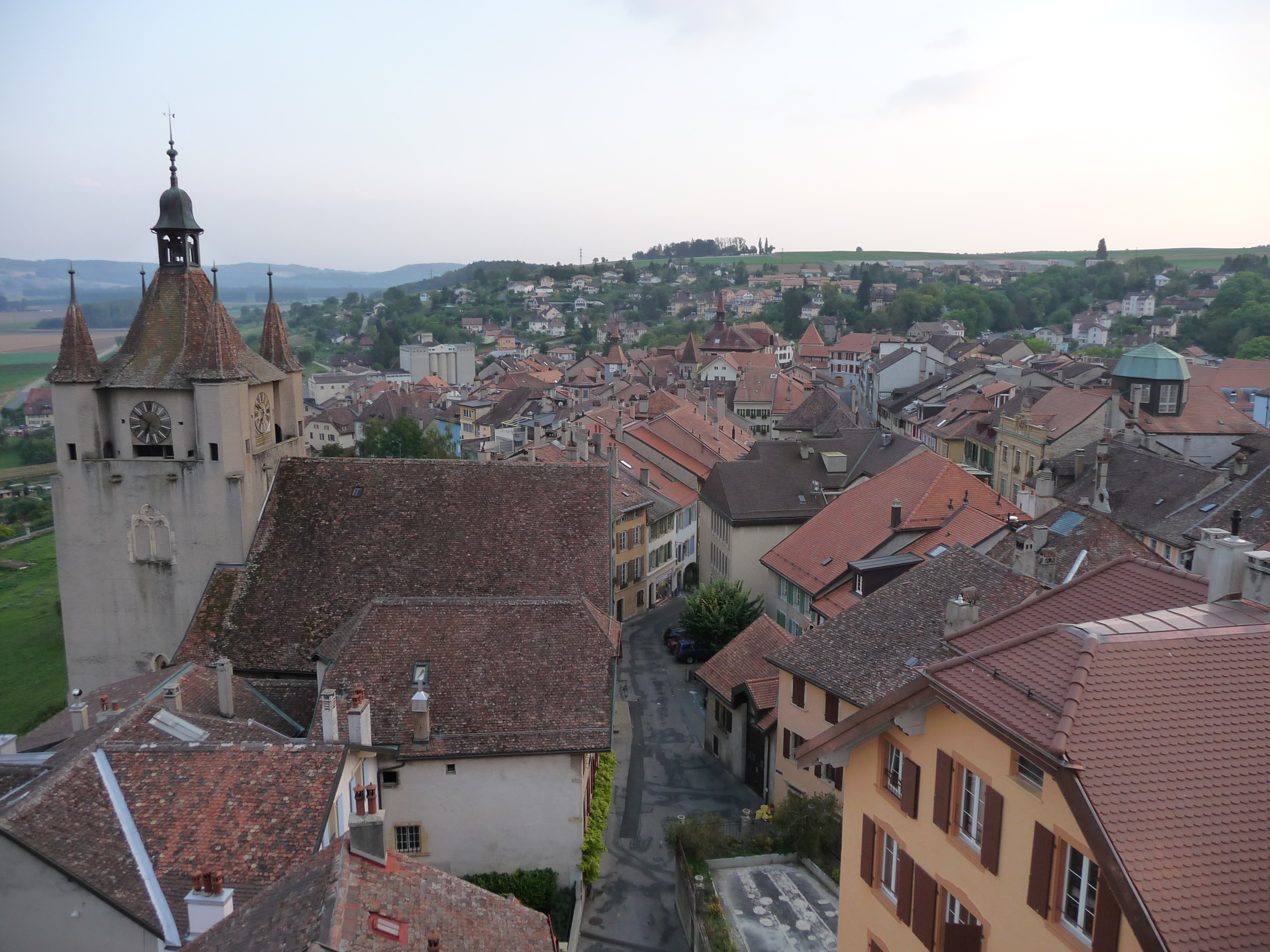
The Church of Notre Dame in Orbe

From the 2000 census, 1,774 or 34.5% were Roman Catholic, while 1,993 or 38.8% belonged to the Swiss Reformed Church. Of the rest of the population, there were 70 members of an Orthodox church (or about 1.36% of the population), there were 3 individuals (or about 0.06% of the population) who belonged to the Christian Catholic Church, and there were 342 individuals (or about 6.65% of the population) who belonged to another Christian church. There were 7 individuals (or about 0.14% of the population) who were Jewish, and 201 (or about 3.91% of the population) who were Islamic. There were 10 individuals who were Buddhist, 14 individuals who were Hindu and 10 individuals who belonged to another church. 620 (or about 12.06% of the population) belonged to no church, are agnostic or atheist, and 260 individuals (or about 5.06% of the population) did not answer the question.

== Education ==
In Orbe about 1,774 or (34.5%) of the population have completed non-mandatory upper secondary education, and 433 or (8.4%) have completed additional higher education (either university or a Fachhochschule). Of the 433 who completed tertiary schooling, 56.1% were Swiss men, 25.9% were Swiss women, 11.3% were non-Swiss men and 6.7% were non-Swiss women.

In the 2009/2010 school year there were a total of 802 students in the Orbe school district. In the Vaud cantonal school system, two years of non-obligatory pre-school are provided by the political districts. During the school year, the political district provided pre-school care for a total of 578 children of which 359 children (62.1%) received subsidized pre-school care. The canton's primary school program requires students to attend for four years. There were 427 students in the municipal primary school program. The obligatory lower secondary school program lasts for six years and there were 368 students in those schools. There were also 7 students who were home schooled or attended another non-traditional school.

Orbe is home to 1 museum, the Fondation Pro Urba. In 2009 it was visited by 2,900 visitors (the average in previous years was 3,278).

As of 2000, there were 322 students in Orbe who came from another municipality, while 219 residents attended schools outside the municipality.

== Notable people ==
- Adelaide of Italy (931–999), also called Adelaide of Burgundy, was a Holy Roman Empress by marriage to Otto I, Holy Roman Emperor
- Pierre Viret (1509/1510–1571), a Reformed theologian, evangelist, and Protestant reformer
- Edmund Davall (1762–1798 in Orbe), a Swiss-English botanist, lived in Orbe from 1788

== See also ==
- Orbe penitentiary complex
