= Lousonna =

Archaeological site in Switzerland

Coordinates: 46.517°N 6.601°E

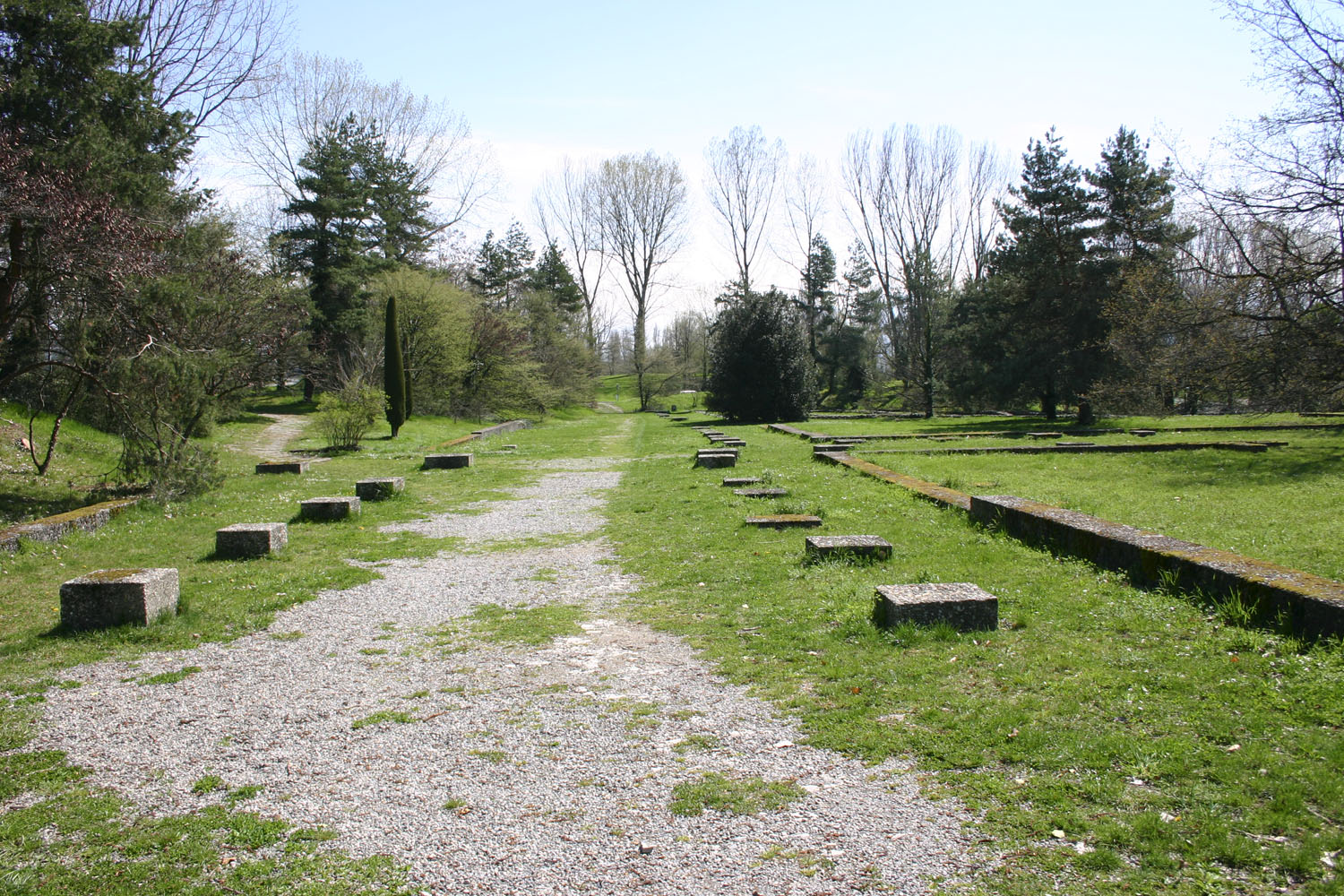
Lousonna

Lousonna (also Lousanna) is a Roman archaeological site in Switzerland. It preceded the present-day city of Lausanne.

The Romans built a military camp on this spot, which they called Lousonna, at the site of a Celtic settlement near Lake Geneva.

== Gallery ==
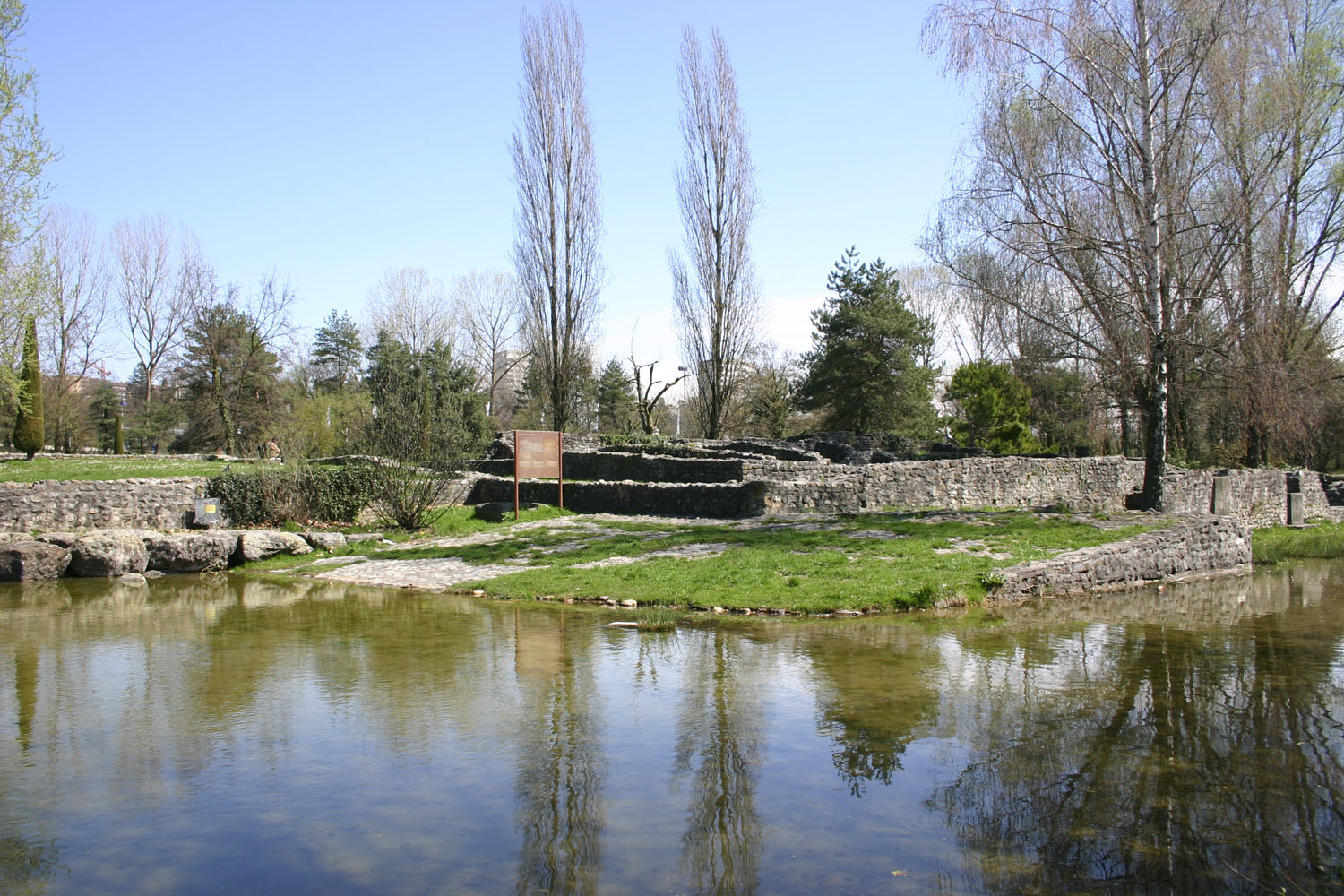

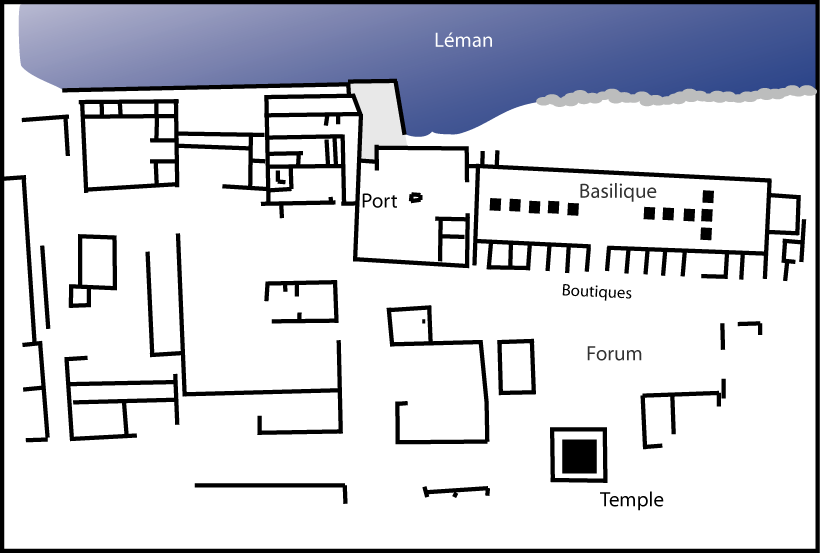
City plan

== See also ==
- Switzerland in the Roman era
