= Benjamin Vautier =

Benjamin Vautier may refer to:

- Benjamin Vautier (Swiss artist) (1829–1898), Swiss genre painter
- Ben Vautier (born 1935), French artist
