= Raphy Dallèves =

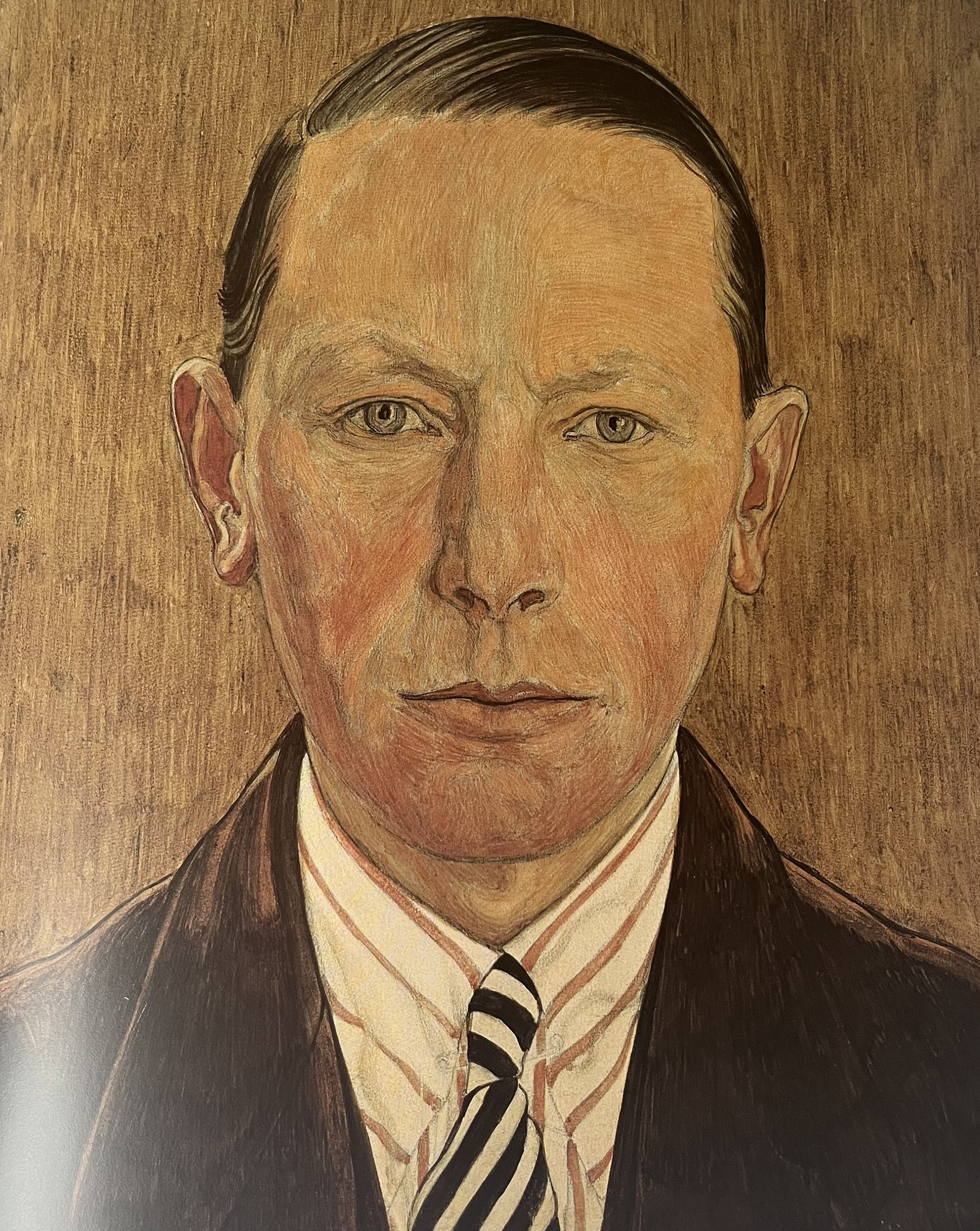
- Self-portrait (tempera)
- Born: 26 January 1878; Sion, Switzerland
- Died: 6 July 1940 (aged 62); Sion, Switzerland
- Education: Académie Julian
- Movement: École de Savièse

Raphy Dallèves (born in Sion on 26 January 1878, where he died on 6 July 1940) was a Valaisan painter of the École de Savièse.

== Biography ==
Raphy Dallèves was the son of Raphaël, Chancellor of State, and of Marie Cropt, daughter of the founder of the first School of Law of the Valais. During his classical studies at the Collège de Sion, he took drawing and painting lessons from Joseph Morand, a Valaisan portrait painter whose studio and residence are none other than the present-day Manoir de la ville de Martigny. Encouraged by Morand, the young Dallèves continued his artistic studies in Paris between 1899 and 1905: the Académie Julian and the École des Beaux-Arts.

In 1903 he was among the founders of the Savièse section of the Society of Swiss Painters and Sculptors. The same year, he took part in the creation of the Société des traditions valaisannes. In 1937 he was appointed a member of the cantonal commission for historic monuments.

He was close to the Vaud painter Ernest Biéler (1863–1948), who had spent every year at Savièse since 1884 and settled there from 1900.

The influence of the older Vaud artist on the Sion painter was considerable, in particular regarding the use of a technique that had fallen into disuse, distemper or the a tempera technique, which both studied from the painters known as the "primitives", namely the Flemish Primitives on the one hand and the Italian or Quattrocento primitives on the other. These investigations were undertaken by the two painters from 1906.

1905 had marked Dallèves's definitive return to his native town. He left it only to find renewal in Italy, in the footsteps of the Florentine painters, particularly Fra Angelico and Botticelli.

Raphy Dallèves's art was widely recognised on the Swiss scene: he took part several times in the National Fine Arts Exhibition, organised by the Federal Department of Home Affairs, whose selection was made by a jury of professionals, artists and museum directors. The Valaisan painter was also a member of the Société Nationale des Beaux-Arts in Paris, whose Salon is its most famous event. Although the artist never sought to exhibit individually, he took part in important international group exhibitions, notably in Munich, Berlin and Rome. His last appearance dates from 1936, when he exhibited in the Casino hall in Sion.

Raphy Dallèves died in Sion on 6 July 1940. In his will, he bequeathed his entire body of work to the City of Sion and the State of Valais. This act would enable the creation of the Cantonal Museum of Fine Arts of the Valais (now the Musée d'art du Valais).

His speciality was the portrayal of people and the gestures of everyday life. He produced complex paintings with physiognomic precision. His work is striking, explores the spiritualisation of human reality.

== Bibliography ==
- Marie-Claude Morand, "Raphy Dallèves", in SIKART, Dictionary of art in Switzerland.
- René Édouard-Joseph, Dictionnaire biographique des artistes contemporains, vol. 1, A–E, Art & Édition, 1930, p. 344.
- Louis Buzzini, Raphy Dallèves, Lausanne, Éd. la Concorde, 1941, 170 p.
- Frédéric Elsig, Raphy Dallèves. Un primitif moderne, Denges, Éd. du Verseau, 1999.

== Gallery ==
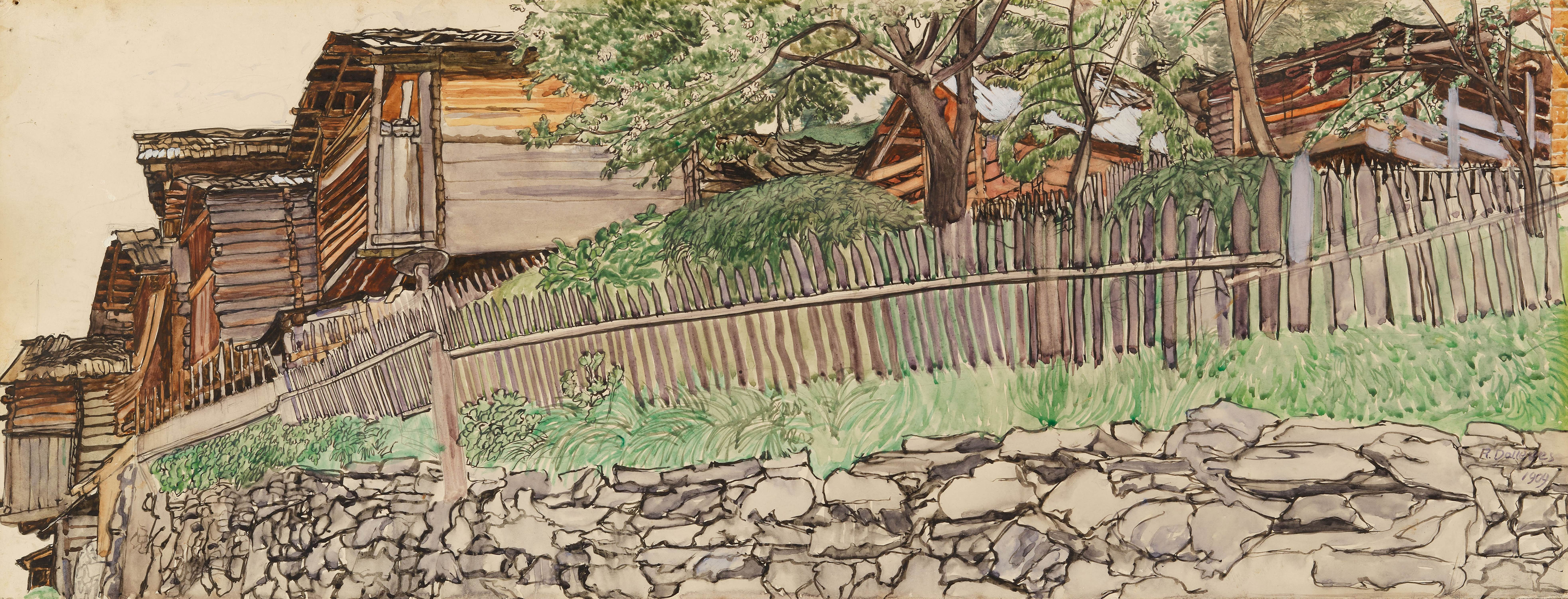
Study of mazots at Hérémence (1909)

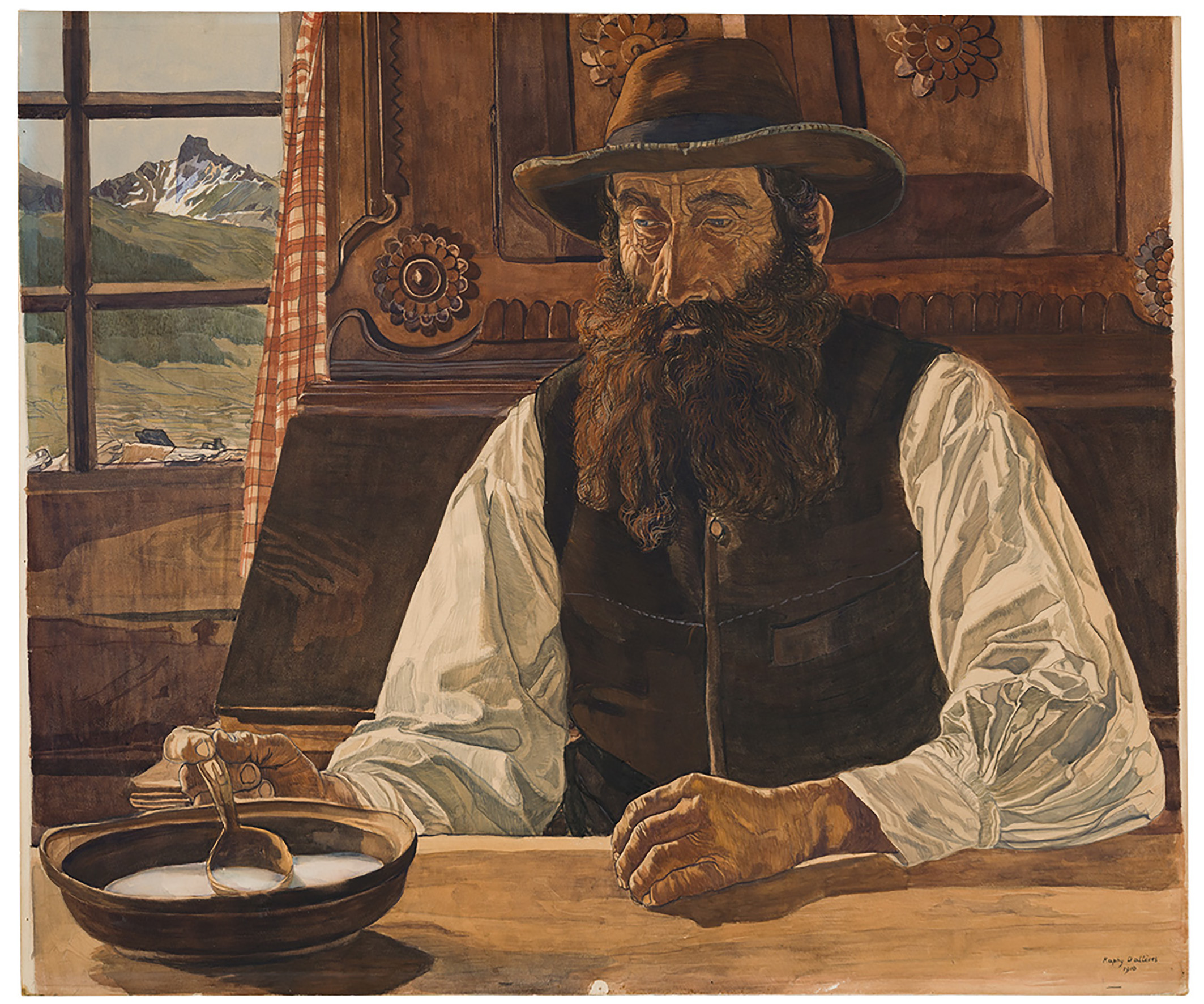
Man with a bowl (1910), Musée d’art du Valais

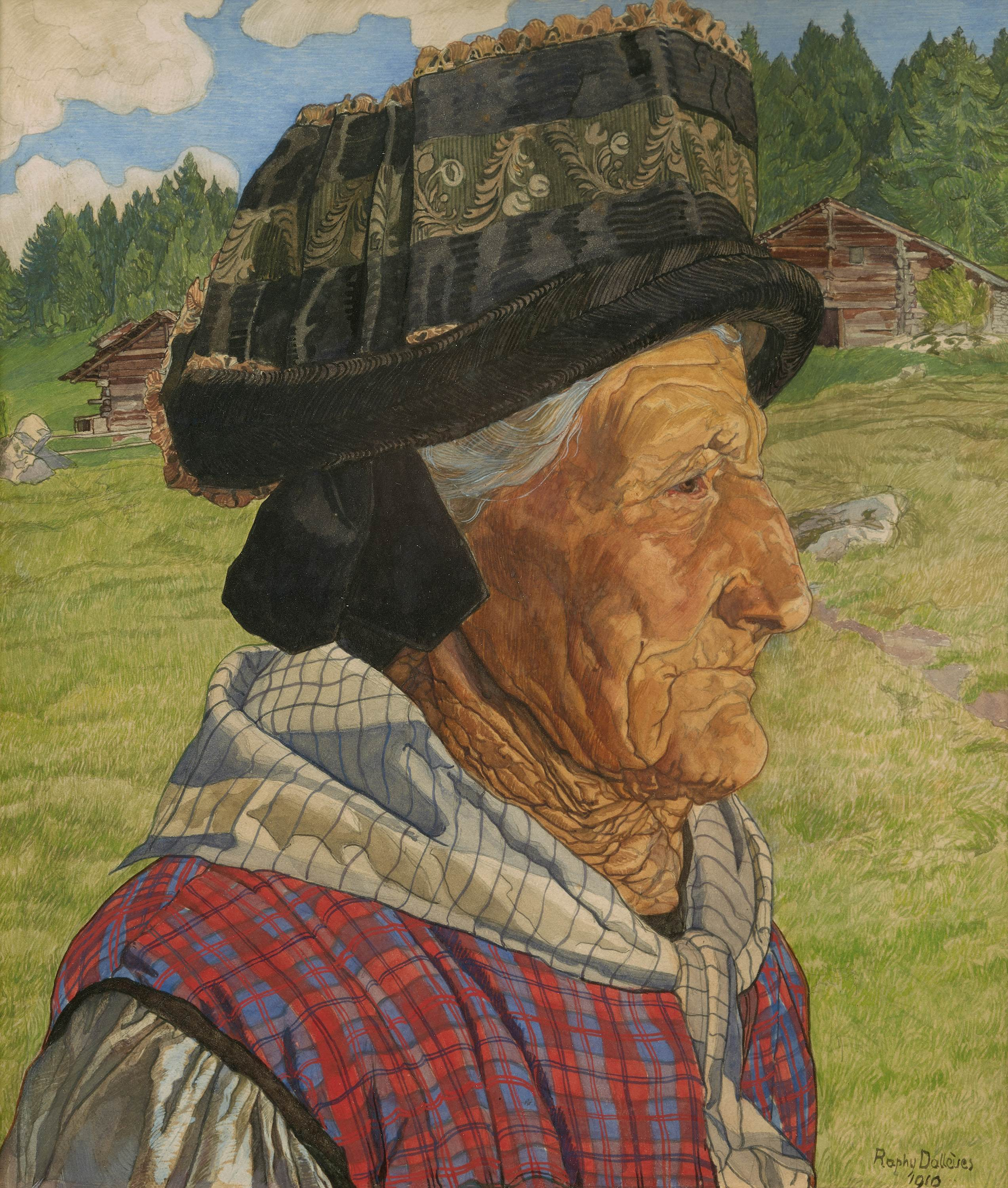
Portrait of an elderly Valais woman (1910)
