= Victoria Hall (Geneva) =

Coordinates: 46.2014°N 6.1411°E

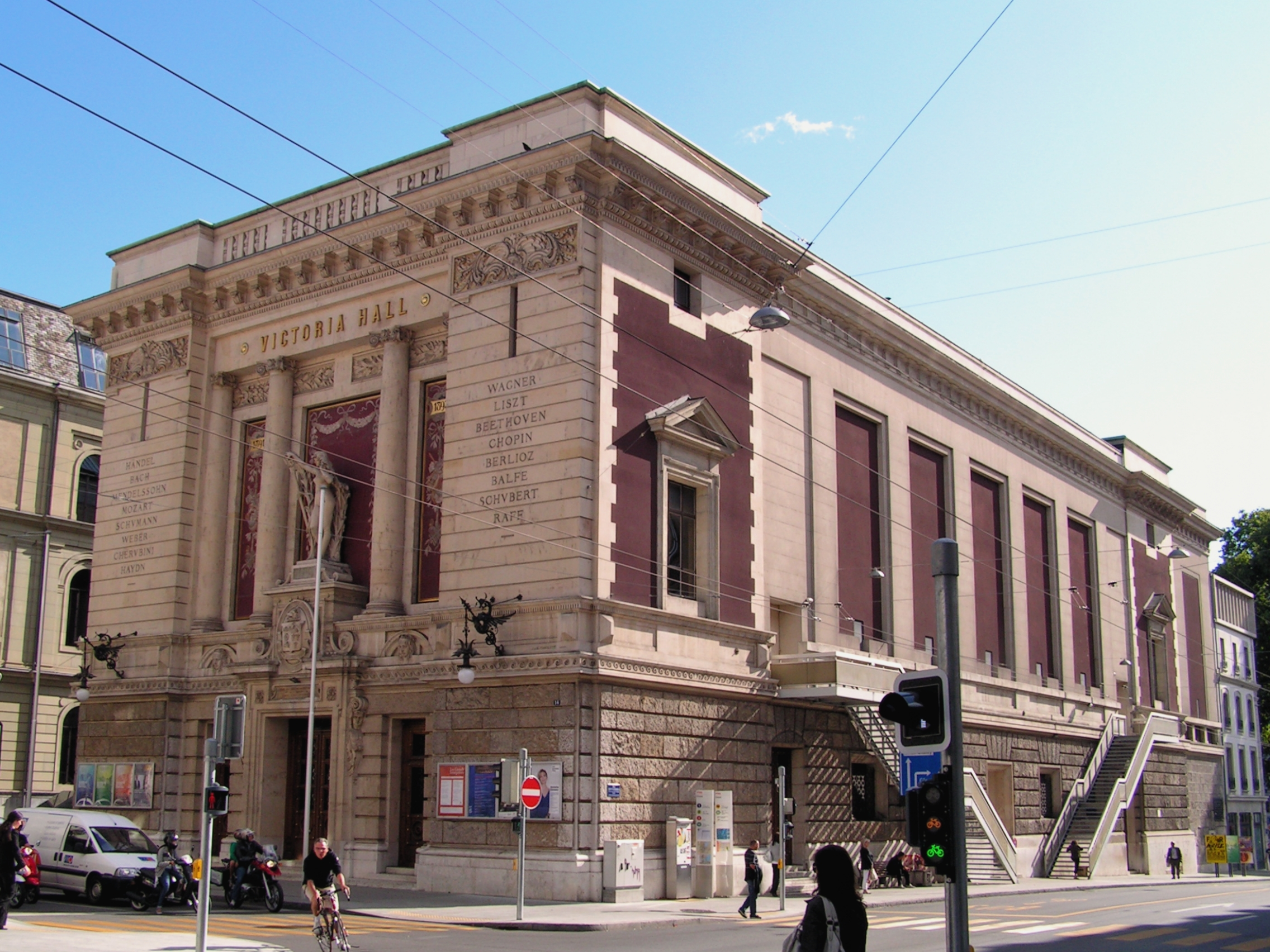
Victoria Hall

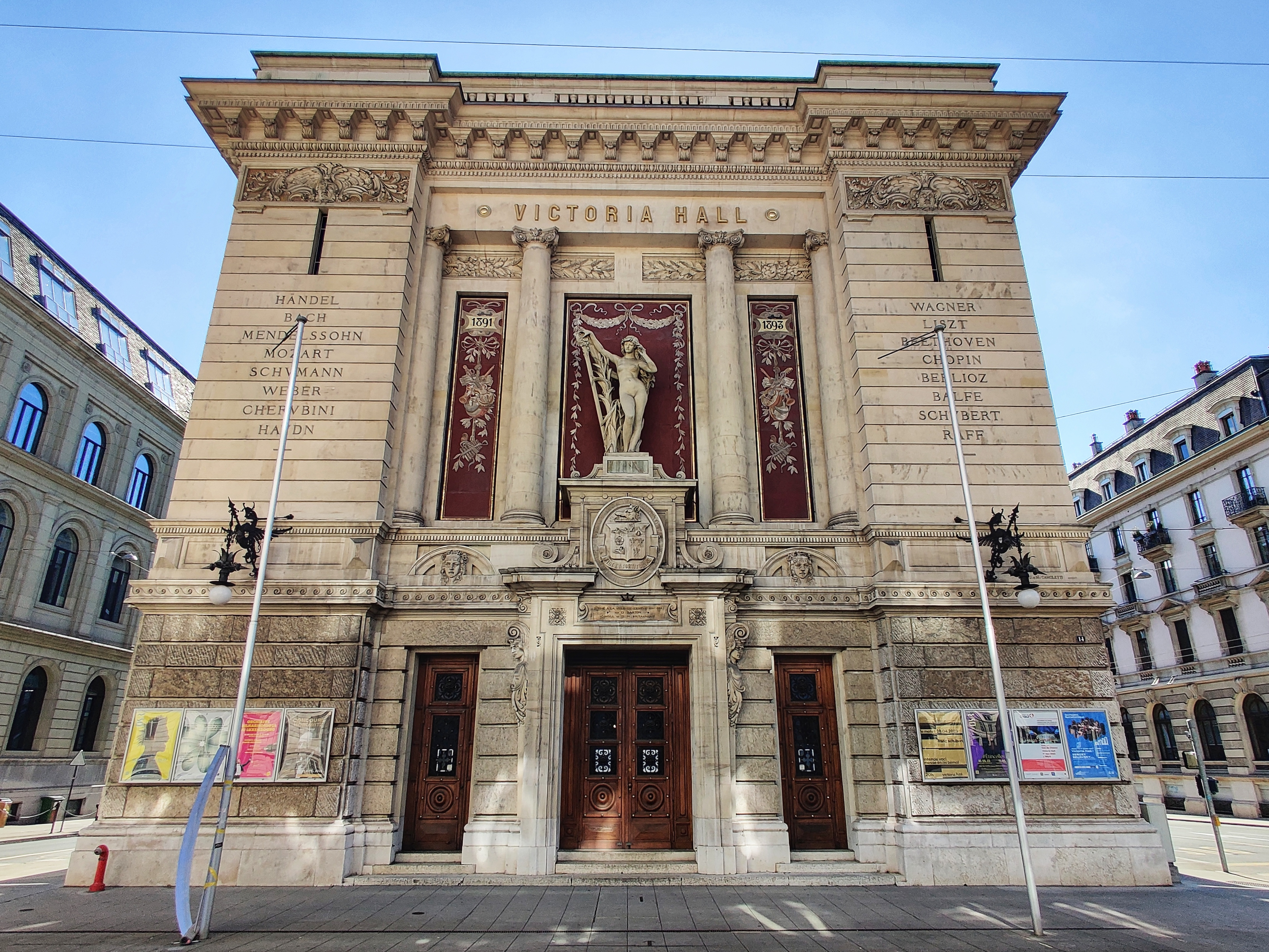
Victoria Hall facade

The Victoria Hall is a 1,700-seat concert venue in Geneva. It is primarily home to the Orchestre de la Suisse Romande (OSR), but also hosts performers in jazz, world music and other genres.

== History ==
It was built in 1891–1894 by architect John Camoletti and financed by the British consul, Daniel Fitzgerald Packenham Barton, who dedicated it to Queen Victoria (and perhaps privately to Victoria-Alexandrina-Julia Peel Barton). Barton gave the hall to the City of Geneva in 1901.

In 1918, the Orchestre de la Suisse Romande (OSR) was founded by Ernest Ansermet, who served as its music director for nearly five decades. The orchestra became known internationally during his tenure, supported by a long-term recording arrangement with Decca Records. Ansermet worked closely with composers such as Ravel, Rachmaninoff, and Debussy, and conducted several works by Igor Stravinsky. As of 2018, the orchestra consisted of 112 permanent musicians and also performed as the opera orchestra at the Grand Théâtre de Genève.

On December 10, 1931, Mahatma Gandhi gave a public lecture at Victoria Hall, invited by the Women’s International League for Peace and Freedom during his visit to Switzerland.

Arson caused a disastrous fire on 16 September 1984. Much original artwork was lost, including decorative paintings by Ernest Biéler, as was the massive original pipe organ. The building was then slowly restored, with a new and equally large organ being installed in 1993, and today it is registered on the cantonal list of heritage buildings. But the paintings were replaced by a contemporary work by Dominique Appia.

== Description ==
The main entrance faces east. The auditorium has a parterre and two layers of balconies. The organ dominates the back of the stage.
