= Barthélemy Menn =

Swiss artist (1815-1893)

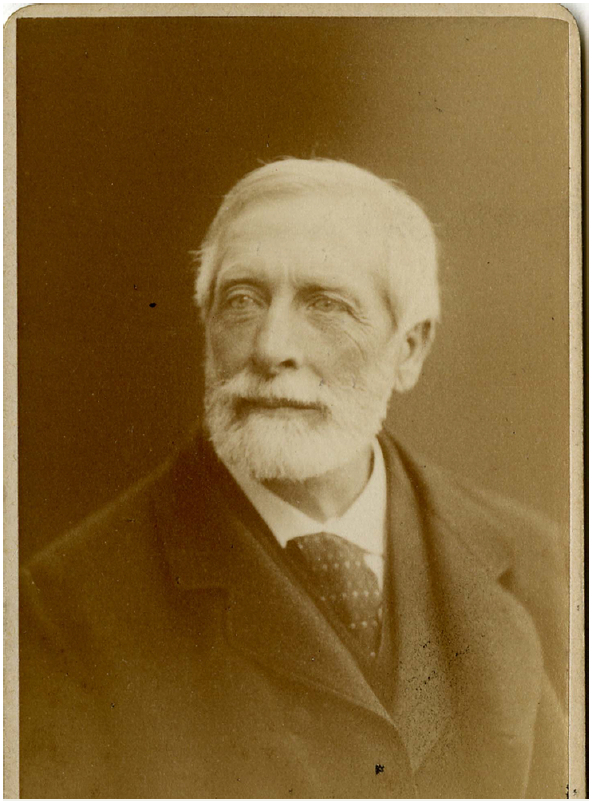
- undate photo from the collections of the Bibliothèque de Genève
- Born: 20 May 1815; Geneva, Switzerland
- Died: 10 October 1893 (aged 78); Coinsins, Switzerland
- Education: Geneva Art Society and apprenticeships
- Known for: Painting
- Notable work: Wetterhorn from Hasliberg
- Movement: plein air painting and paysage intime

Barthélemy Menn (20 May 1815 – 10 October 1893) was a Swiss painter and draughtsman who introduced the principles of plein-air painting and the paysage intime into Swiss art.

== Early life ==
Menn was the youngest of four sons, born in Geneva to Louis John Menn, a confectioner from Scuol in the canton of Grisons, and Charlotte-Madeleine-Marguerite Bodmer, the daughter of a wealthy farmer from Coinsins in the Canton de Vaud. Already at the age of twelve, Menn took drawing lessons from the little-known Jean Duboi (1789–1849), and later, he entered the drawing school of the Geneva Arts Society. The repeated claim that he was also a pupil of the famous enameller Abraham Constantin appears to be erroneous.

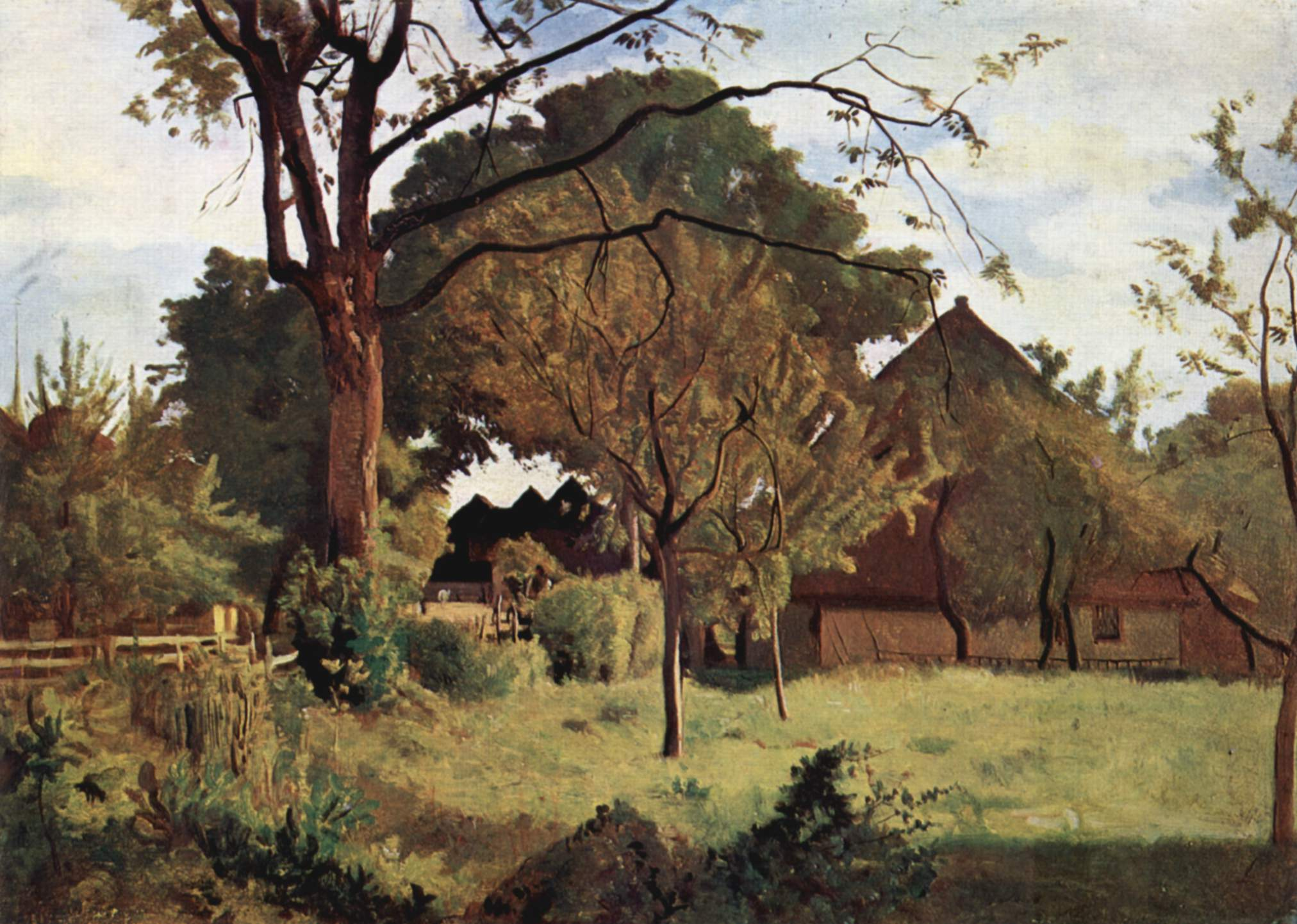
Farmhouse in Coinsins

In 1831, Menn was second in the annual drawing competition of the Geneva Art Society. The following year, he entered the studio of the Swiss history painter Jean-Léonard Lugardon, who was a pupil of Baron Gros and became acquainted with Jean-Auguste-Dominique Ingres. There, Menn was educated in figure drawing and composition before heading for Paris, where, in fall 1833, he entered the studio of Ingres. He was, therefore, no beginner when meeting the master, but needed some polishing and refinement in his art. In a letter to his friend Jules Hébert, Menn reported on the new situation: "Everybody, even the eldest in the studio tremble before Mr. Ingres. One fears him a lot in such a way that his corrections have a great impact. He is of an extreme sensibility." while the education in Ingres’ studio has been described by Théophile Silvestre, as follows: "The students spend half of their time studying nature and half studying the masters among which they are especially attached to Phidias, the bas-reliefs of the Parthenon, classical sculpture in general." This explains why among Menn's early works there are many copies of the Parthenon frieze that had been accessible in Paris as a set of plaster casts at the École des Beaux-Arts since 1816. Menn also copied several works by Raffael, Titian, Veronese and Rubens in the Louvre, and works by Ingres.

When the latter decided to give up his studio to take the post as director of the French Academy in the Villa Medici in Rome, Menn returned to his grandparents in Coinsins before following his master in fall 1834. His journey led him first via Milan to Venice, where he met briefly with his compatriot Louis Léopold Robert, and copied works by Titian and Tintoretto. He then travelled via Padua and Bologna to Florence, where he met old classmates from Ingres’ studio, and arrived finally in Rome in spring 1835. There, Menn copied works by Raphael and Michelangelo, but he also started to produce extraordinary fresh small landscape paintings in the open air. In summer 1836, he visited the Campagna, Capri and Naples, where too he drew and painted landscapes directly from nature, and copied classical antiquities from Pompeii as well as Giovanni Bellini's Transfiguration in the Museo Borbonico.

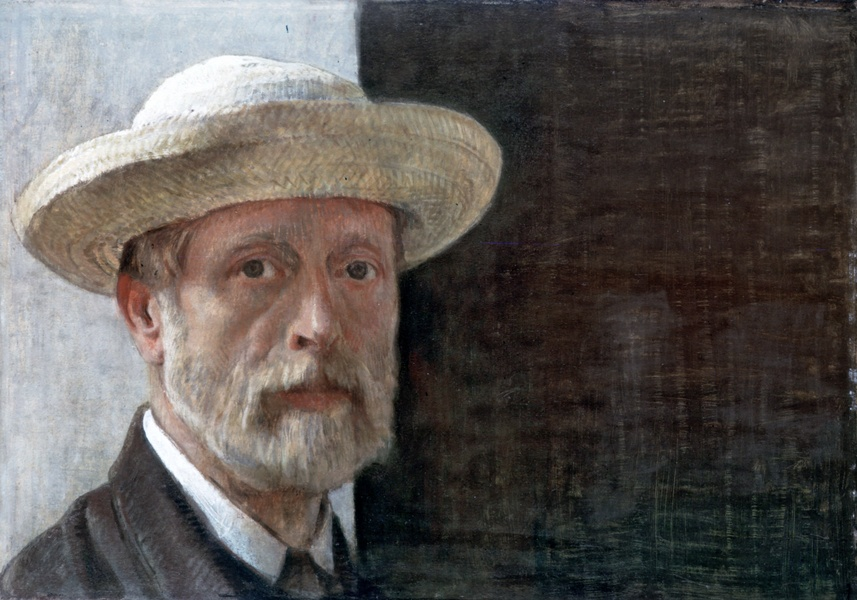
Self-portrait

When back in Rome, he produced history - and genre paintings, of which in 1837, he sent 'Solomon presented to Wisdom by his Parents' (Salomon présenté à la sagesse par son père et sa mère) to the annual Salon in Geneva. Menn returned via Florence, Siena and Viterbo to Paris in late 1838, where he exhibited at the Salon from 1839 to 1843, and where he became the drawing master of Maurice Dudevant, the son of George Sand. In her circle, he became acquainted with Eugène Delacroix (1798–1863) who wanted to employ him as an assistant while working on the decoration of the cupola of the library in the Palais du Luxembourg. At the same time, Menn got to know the painters of the Barbizon School; especially Charles Daubigny. Most importantly, however, Menn became friends with Camille Corot, who, from 1842 onwards, visited Switzerland frequently. It was also in Paris that he became acquainted with members of the Bovy family of Geneva who were followers of the utopian socialist ideas of Charles Fourier.

== Later career ==
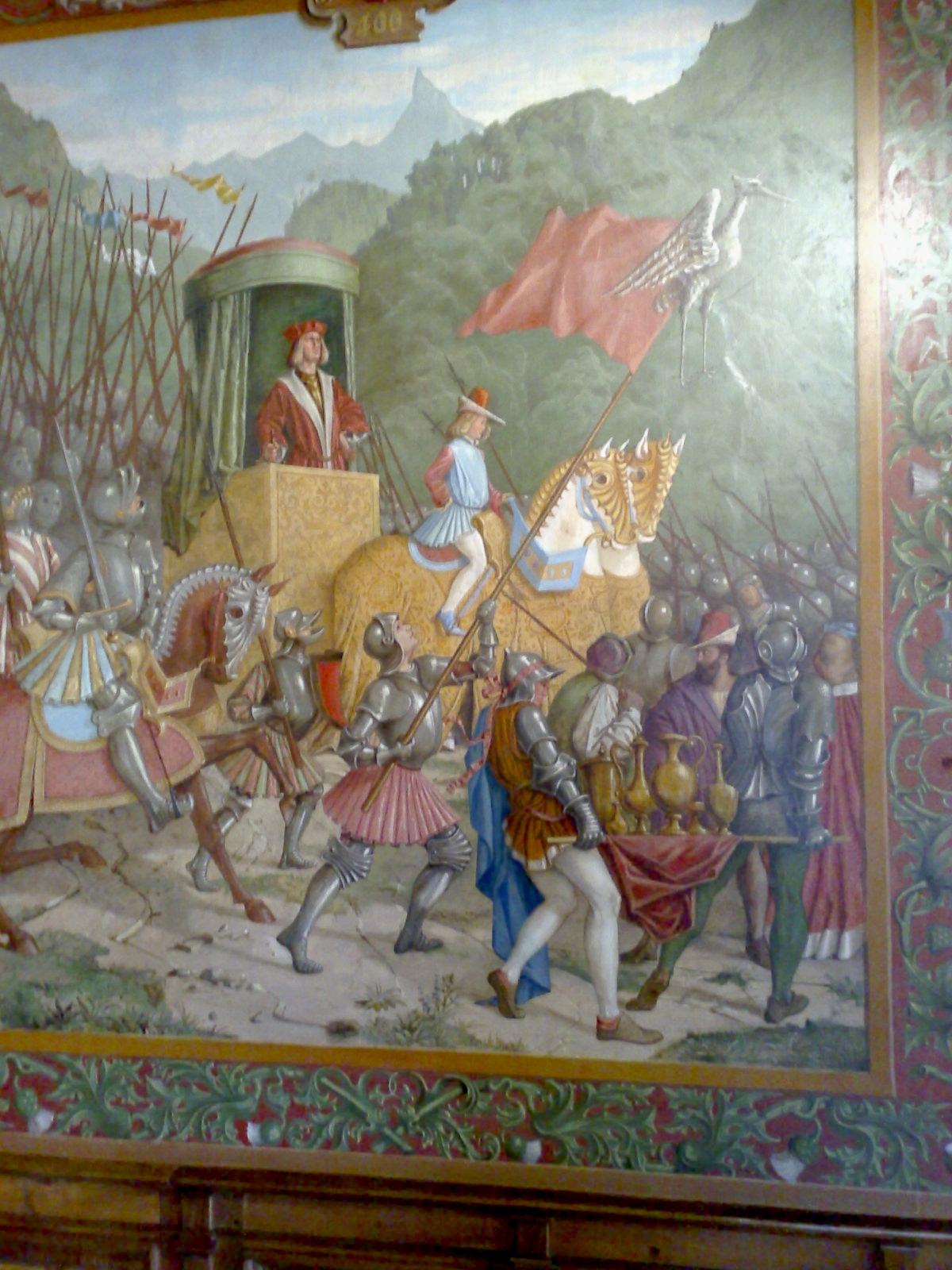
Fresco from the Salle des chevaliers, Castle of Gruyères

Due to lack of commissions, Menn returned to Geneva, where, in 1844, he applied in vain for a teaching position at the local art school. In the following year, he exhibited a large alpine landscape, "Wetterhorn from Hasliberg", which caused a minor scandal as it did not meet the public's and critics’ expectations of smooth, highly finished, heroic alpine views. This incident did not help much in getting him a public job as professor of painting or drawing. Hence, he started to accept private pupils in his studio. In these years, Menn also experimented together with Jules Darier, another of Corot's friends in Geneva, in producing daguerreotypes, though none of them are known to have been preserved. He also travelled again extensively, this time along the Rhone Valley and to the South of France. It was in these years that he turned completely to the paysage intime (intimate landscape) and achieved similar results to those of Corot, without attaining the latter's impressive level of creativity. In 1850, Menn was appointed director of the Geneva art school and from then on taught figure drawing, rather than landscapes, for 42 years. In this position, he trained two generations of Swiss painters, among them Eugène Burnand, Pierre Pignolat, Edouard Vallet and Ferdinand Hodler, who reputedly said: ‘It is to him [Menn] that I owe everything’.

Menn made a second voyage to Rome in 1852 and, in conjunction with Corot, Henri Baron (1816–1885), Armand Leleux (1818–1885) and François-Louis Français, decorated the large salon in Gruyères Castle that then belonged to the Bovy family. Menn also organized three exhibitions with contemporary French painting in Geneva in 1857, 1859 and 1861 that showed works by Corot, Courbet, Daubigny and Delacroix. Yet, the critics in Calvin's hometown were harsh and hostile towards contemporary art, which annoyed Menn so much as that he resolved never to exhibit in public again. He became even reluctant to sell his works privately and finally, in the 1880s, destroyed many of his paintings. In 1865, at the age of fifty, Menn married the widow of his cousin Jean Bodmer, Louise Bodmer-Gauthier (1818–1887), who brought with her a beautiful estate at Coinsins. It is here that Menn found peace and painted most of his last landscapes.

== Legacy ==
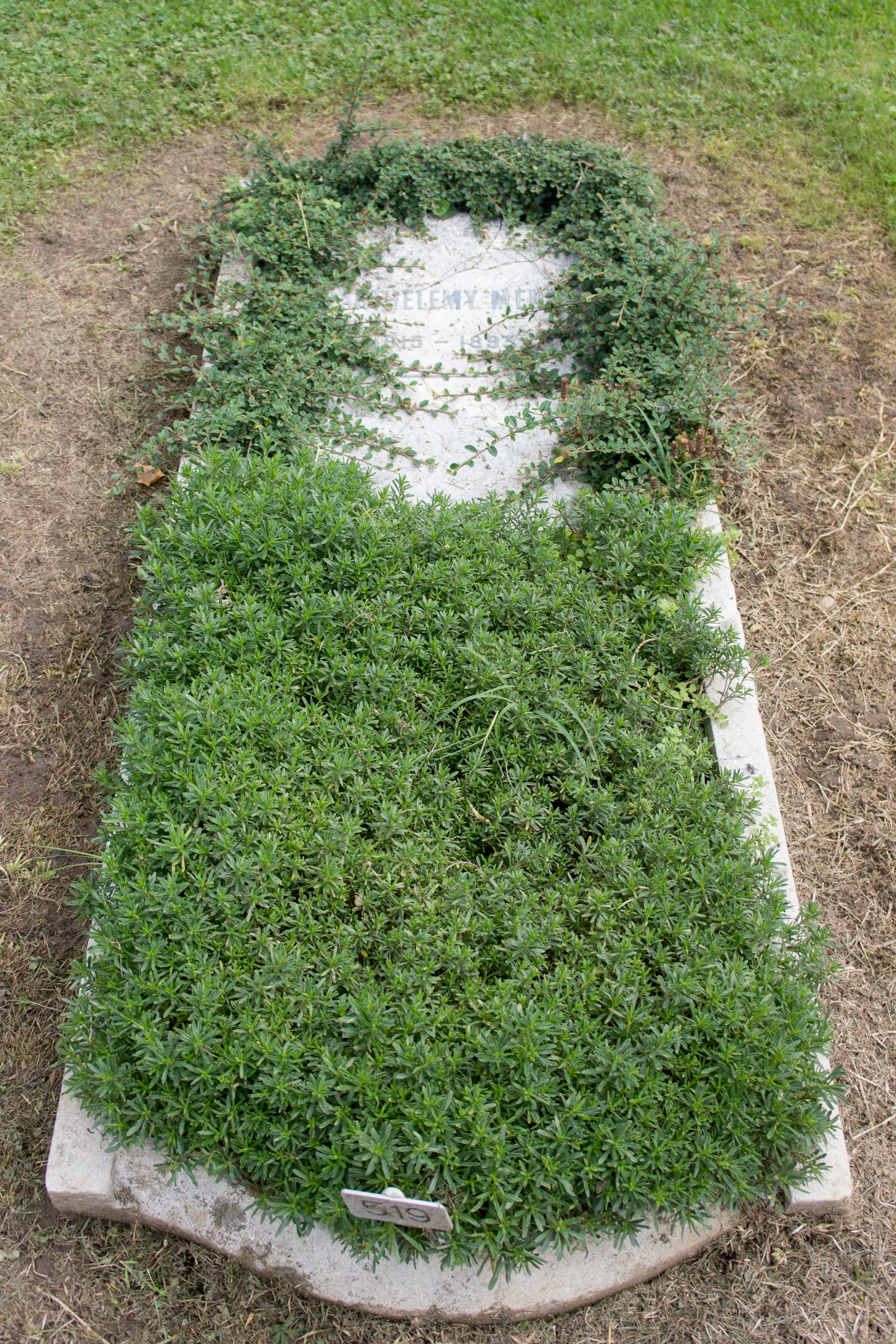
Menn's grave

Although Menn was trained as a history painter and had, during his last forty years, only taught figure drawing, it was he who challenged the Swiss academic landscape tradition as early as 1845. At that time, the internationally successful Alexandre Calame and the somewhat older François Diday dominated Swiss alpine painting with romantic, wild and fantastic mountain sceneries that have carefully composed foregrounds against which distant but highlighted mountain peaks are set under a pleasantly blue sky – or in a frightening storm. Menn, however, when exhibiting his Wetterhorn from Hasliberg at the annual art exhibition in Geneva, had not only ventured into the domain of his competitor Calame, but had done so by applying the principles of plein-air-painting to an alpine landscape. The ‘photographic’ view point, the structure of the rock formations and the handling of light and colour make this picture the earliest modern landscape in Swiss art history.

As the painting did not go down well with the critics, Menn turned to more modest landscapes that he painted outdoors, and with which he introduced the principles of the modern French paysage-intime into Switzerland. ‘In a bush I see everything’, Menn used to say, capturing in his self-contained landscapes atmospheric changes of evening and morning hours, quiet harmonies of an unspoilt riverbank, a swampy plain or of an orchard in midday, casting them in sensitive tonal values and poetic tenderness. His approach derived entirely from contemporary French landscape painting, in particular from his friend Corot whom Menn called the ‘master of the right values’. It was these new values combined with his quest for natural beauty that Menn would promote as a teacher to generations of Swiss artists.

Barthélemy Menn is buried at the Cimetière des Rois in Geneva.
