= Ernest Biéler =

Swiss painter

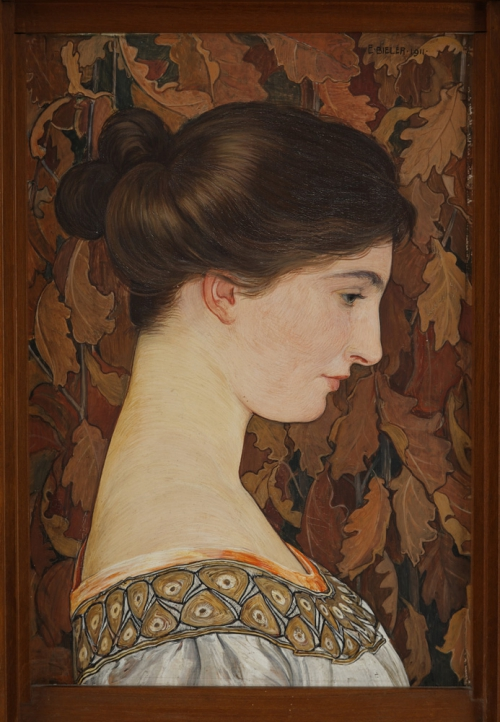
- 1911 portrait of a young woman
- Born: July 31, 1863; Rolle, Switzerland
- Died: June 25, 1948 (aged 84); Lausanne, Switzerland
- Education: Académie Julian, Paris
- Known for: Painting, drawing, printmaking
- Awards: Orde national de la Légion d'honneur
- Website: www.ernest-bieler.ch

Ernest Biéler (July 31, 1863 – June 25, 1948) was a Swiss painter, draughtsman and printmaker. He worked in oil, tempera, watercolour, gouache, ink, charcoal, pastels, acrylic and pencil. He also created mosaics and stained glass windows.

== Biography ==
He was born in Rolle, Switzerland. After completing his education in Lausanne, he studied at the Académie Julian in Paris. In 1900, he received the silver medal of the Exposition Universelle of Paris. He founded with Raphaël Ritz, Edouard Vallet and others, the École de Savièse. He was made a Knight of the Légion d'honneur.

Although he travelled widely, he remained attached to Savièse and often depicted scenes of peasant life with a remarkable degree of detail. Bieler also produced stained glass windows for the church and the federal building in Bern, and decorated a ceiling for the City Theatre in Berne. He also painted the interior of the Victoria Hall, but this work was destroyed during the 1984 fire of the building.

He died in 1948 in Lausanne.

== Sources ==
- James Bolivar Manson (1936). Ernest Biéler : peintre suisse. Lausanne: Éditions La Concorde. OCLC 5321583.
- Maurice Jean-Petit-Matile (1976). Ernest Biéler. Lutry: Éditions Marendaz. OCLC 3327466.
- Ernest Biéler. Kunsthalle Bern. 7 mai bis 12 juni 1938. Bern: Druck von Büchler. 1938. OCLC 25899445.
- Ernest Bieler (Swiss, 1863-1948). Biography & picture
- Ernest Bieler (Swiss, 1863-1948). Watercolor portraits
