= Duillier =

- Municipality
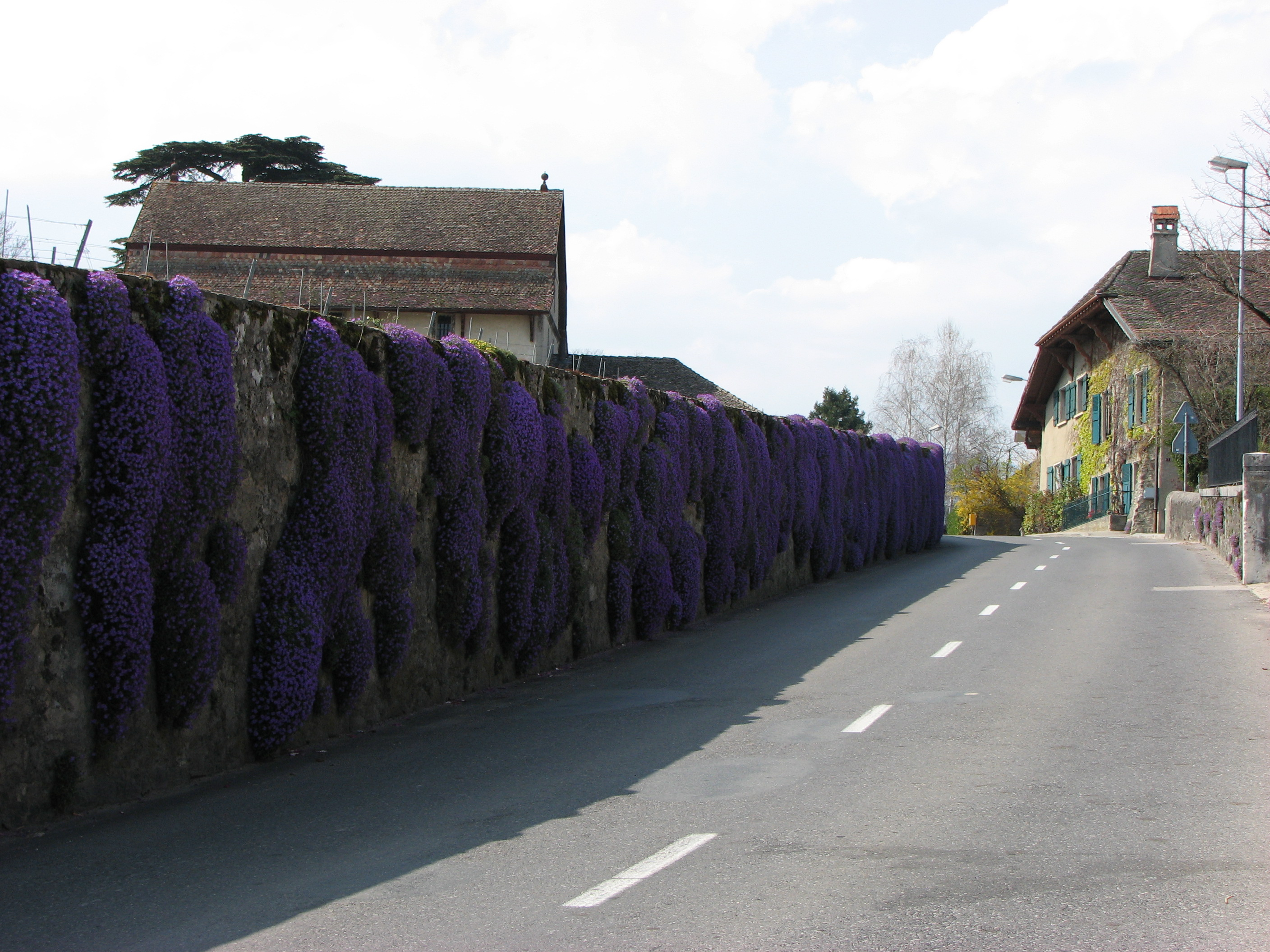
- Flowers and buildings in Duillier village

- Flag Coat of arms
- Location of Duillier
- Location within Switzerland Location within Canton of Vaud
- Coordinates: 46°25′N 6°14′E
- Country: Switzerland
- Canton: Vaud
- District: Nyon

Government
  - Mayor: Syndic

Area
  - Total: 4.1 km^{2} (1.6 sq mi)
- Elevation: 466 m (1,529 ft)

Population (2003)
  - Total: 933
  - Density: 230/km^{2} (590/sq mi)
- Time zone: UTC+01:00 (CET)
  - Summer (DST): UTC+02:00 (CEST)
- Postal code: 1266
- SFOS number: 5715
- ISO 3166 code: CH-VD
- Surrounded by: Coinsins, Genolier, Givrins, Nyon, Prangins, Trélex
- Website: www.duillier.ch

Duillier (French pronunciation: [dɥije]) is a municipality in the district of Nyon in the canton of Vaud in Switzerland.

== History ==
Duillier is first mentioned in 1145 as Duelliei.

== Geography ==
Duillier has an area, as of 2009, of 4.1 square kilometers (1.6 mi^{2}). Of this area, 3.09 km^{2} (1.19 mi^{2}) or 75.2% is used for agricultural purposes, while 0.32 km^{2} (0.12 mi^{2}) or 7.8% is forested. Of the rest of the land, 0.66 km^{2} (0.25 mi^{2}) or 16.1% is settled (buildings or roads).

Of the built up area, housing and buildings made up 8.8% and transportation infrastructure made up 6.1%. Out of the forested land, 6.3% of the total land area is heavily forested and 1.5% is covered with orchards or small clusters of trees. Of the agricultural land, 56.4% is used for growing crops and 5.1% is pastures, while 13.6% is used for orchards or vine crops.

The municipality was part of the Nyon District until it was dissolved on 31 August 2006, and Duillier became part of the new district of Nyon.

The municipality is located along the Nyon-Arzier road.

== Coat of arms ==
The blazon of the municipal coat of arms is Per pale Gules and Argent, a Bend Sable overall between two Roundels counterchanged.

== Demographics ==
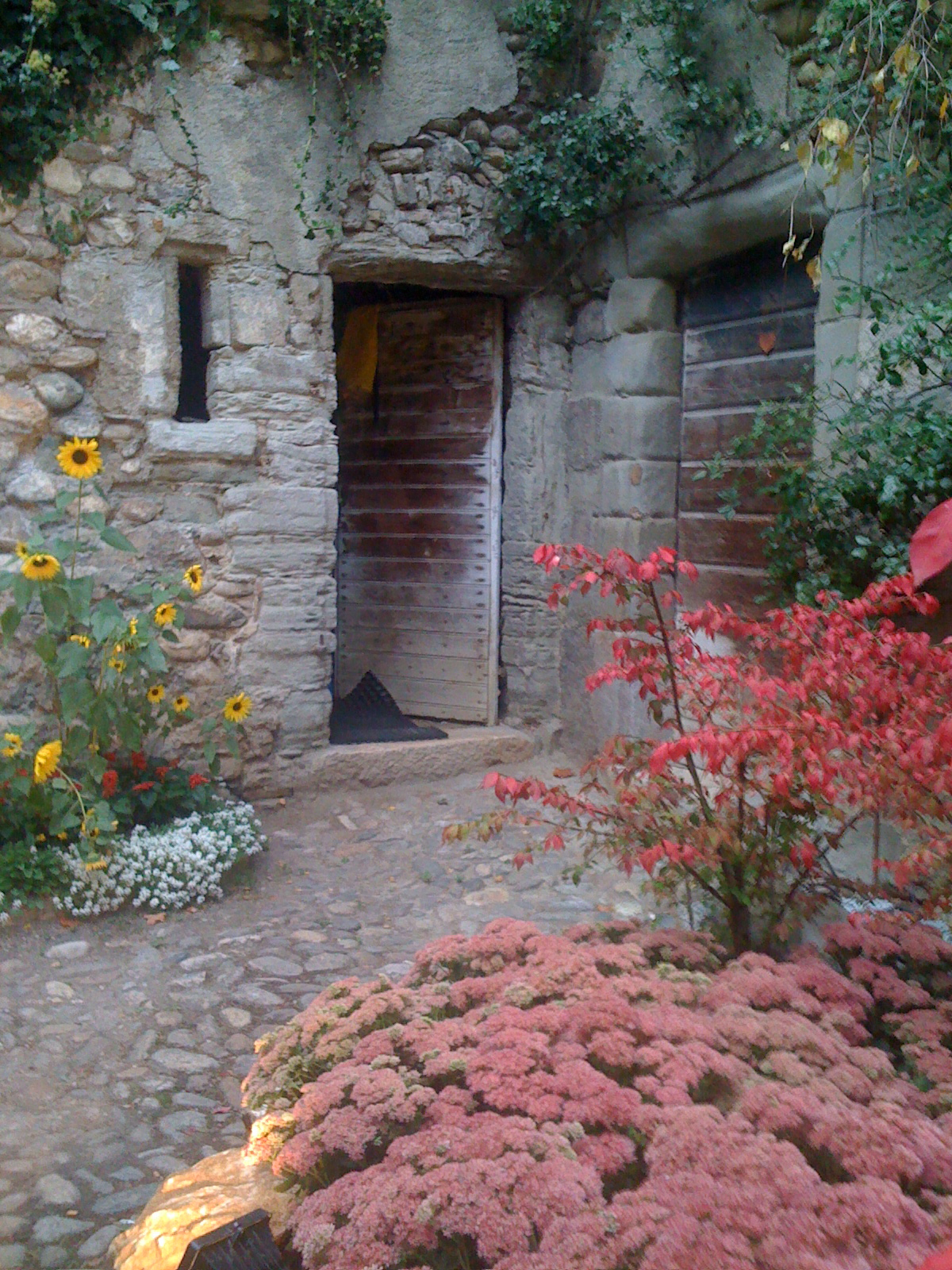
Courtyard in the old part of Duillier

Duillier has a population (as of December 2020) of 1,131. As of 2008, 22.8% of the population are resident foreign nationals. Over the last 10 years (1999–2009 ) the population has changed at a rate of 19.1%. It has changed at a rate of 8.8% due to migration and at a rate of 10.1% due to births and deaths.

Most of the population (as of 2000) speaks French (709 or 78.7%), with German being second most common (87 or 9.7%) and English being third (63 or 7.0%). There are 16 people who speak Italian.

The age distribution, as of 2009, in Duillier is; 136 children or 13.0% of the population are between 0 and 9 years old and 145 teenagers or 13.9% are between 10 and 19. Of the adult population, 98 people or 9.4% of the population are between 20 and 29 years old. 170 people or 16.3% are between 30 and 39, 198 people or 19.0% are between 40 and 49, and 120 people or 11.5% are between 50 and 59. The senior population distribution is 97 people or 9.3% of the population are between 60 and 69 years old, 57 people or 5.5% are between 70 and 79, there are 21 people or 2.0% who are between 80 and 89, and there are 2 people or 0.2% who are 90 and older.

As of 2000, there were 362 people who were single and never married in the municipality. There were 456 married individuals, 33 widows or widowers and 50 individuals who are divorced.

As of 2000, there were 371 private households in the municipality, and an average of 2.4 persons per household. There were 111 households that consist of only one person and 15 households with five or more people. Out of a total of 380 households that answered this question, 29.2% were households made up of just one person. Of the rest of the households, there are 102 married couples without children, 122 married couples with children There were 33 single parents with a child or children. There were 3 households that were made up of unrelated people and 9 households that were made up of some sort of institution or another collective housing.

In 2000 there were 136 single family homes (or 66.7% of the total) out of a total of 204 inhabited buildings. There were 44 multi-family buildings (21.6%), along with 13 multi-purpose buildings that were mostly used for housing (6.4%) and 11 other use buildings (commercial or industrial) that also had some housing (5.4%).

In 2000, a total of 347 apartments (90.8% of the total) were permanently occupied, while 31 apartments (8.1%) were seasonally occupied and 4 apartments (1.0%) were empty. As of 2009, the construction rate of new housing units was 2.8 new units per 1000 residents. The vacancy rate for the municipality, in 2010, was 0%.

The historical population is given in the following chart:

== Heritage sites of national significance ==
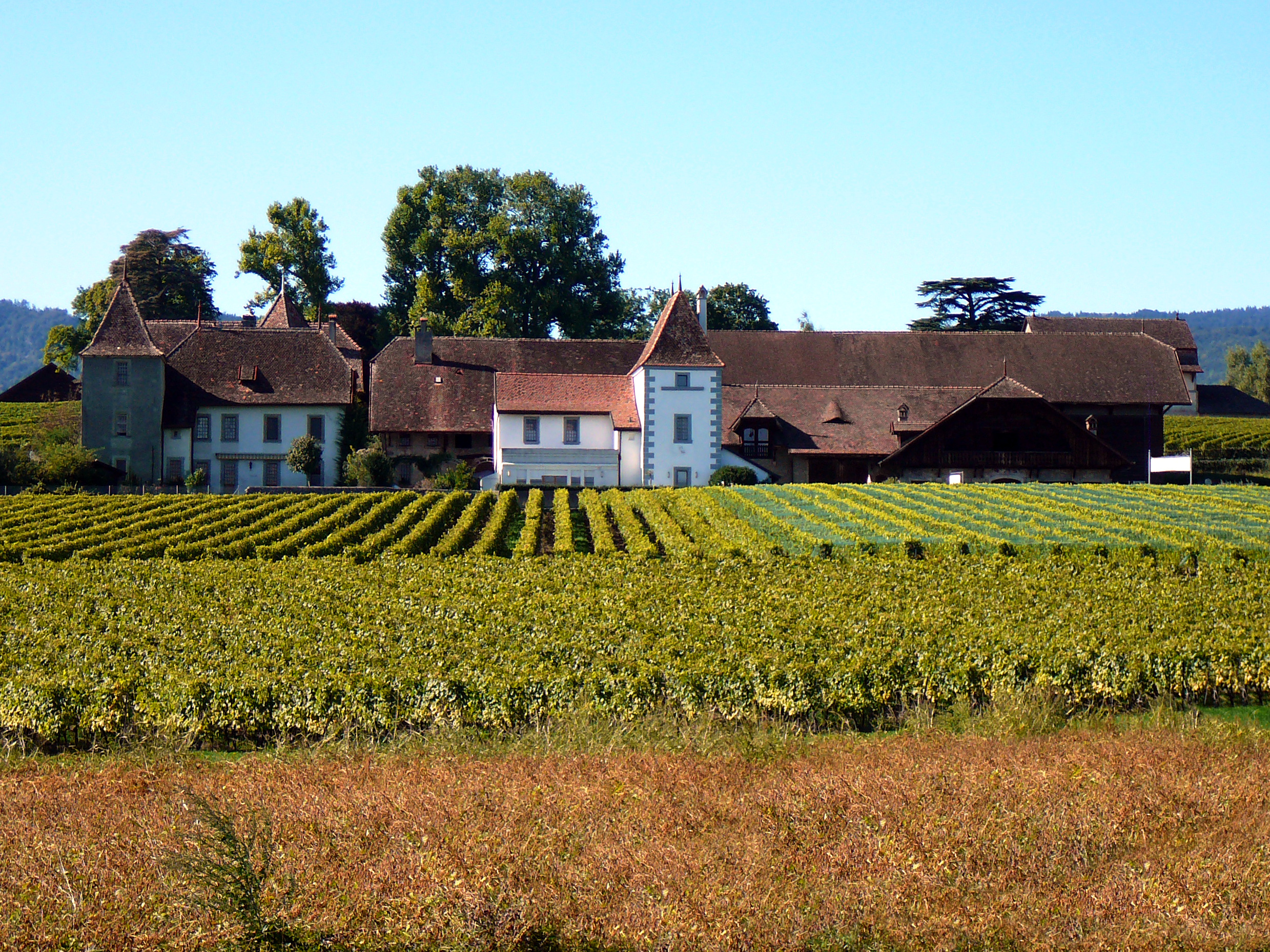
Duillier Castle

Duillier Castle and the tithe barn are listed as Swiss heritage site of national significance.

== Politics ==
In the 2007 federal election the most popular party was the FDP which received 21.4% of the vote. The next three most popular parties were the SVP (18.28%), the SP (15.7%) and the Green Party (14.53%). In the federal election, a total of 267 votes were cast, and the voter turnout was 43.8%.

== Economy ==
As of 2010, Duillier had an unemployment rate of 4.2%. As of 2008, there were 29 people employed in the primary economic sector and about 8 businesses involved in this sector. 58 people were employed in the secondary sector and there were 12 businesses in this sector. 253 people were employed in the tertiary sector, with 32 businesses in this sector. There were 458 residents of the municipality who were employed in some capacity, of which females made up 40.2% of the workforce.

In 2008 the total number of full-time equivalent jobs was 314. The number of jobs in the primary sector was 24, all of which were in agriculture. The number of jobs in the secondary sector was 54 of which 15 or (27.8%) were in manufacturing and 40 (74.1%) were in construction. The number of jobs in the tertiary sector was 236. In the tertiary sector; 32 or 13.6% were in wholesale or retail sales or the repair of motor vehicles, 8 or 3.4% were in the movement and storage of goods, 12 or 5.1% were in a hotel or restaurant, 6 or 2.5% were in the information industry, 163 or 69.1% were technical professionals or scientists, 4 or 1.7% were in education.

In 2000, there were 140 workers who commuted into the municipality and 377 workers who commuted away. The municipality is a net exporter of workers, with about 2.7 workers leaving the municipality for every one entering. About 16.4% of the workforce coming into Duillier are coming from outside Switzerland. Of the working population, 14.2% used public transportation to get to work, and 71% used a private car.

== Religion ==
From the 2000 census, 284 or 31.5% were Roman Catholic, while 362 or 40.2% belonged to the Swiss Reformed Church. Of the rest of the population, there were 7 members of an Orthodox church (or about 0.78% of the population), there were 5 individuals (or about 0.55% of the population) who belonged to the Christian Catholic Church, and there were 26 individuals (or about 2.89% of the population) who belonged to another Christian church. There were 8 individuals (or about 0.89% of the population) who were Jewish, and 7 (or about 0.78% of the population) who were Islamic. There were 4 individuals who were Hindu. 187 (or about 20.75% of the population) belonged to no church, are agnostic or atheist, and 22 individuals (or about 2.44% of the population) did not answer the question.

== Education ==
In Duillier about 348 or (38.6%) of the population have completed non-mandatory upper secondary education, and 215 or (23.9%) have completed additional higher education (either university or a Fachhochschule). Of the 215 who completed tertiary schooling, 43.7% were Swiss men, 26.5% were Swiss women, 16.7% were non-Swiss men and 13.0% were non-Swiss women.

In the 2009/2010 school year there were a total of 152 students in the Duillier school district. In the Vaud cantonal school system, two years of non-obligatory pre-school are provided by the political districts. During the school year, the political district provided pre-school care for a total of 1,249 children of which 563 children (45.1%) received subsidized pre-school care. The canton's primary school program requires students to attend for four years. There were 75 students in the municipal primary school program. The obligatory lower secondary school program lasts for six years and there were 77 students in those schools.

As of 2000, there was one student in Duillier who came from another municipality, while 115 residents attended schools outside the municipality.
