= Benjamin Vautier (Swiss artist) =

Swiss genre painter and illustrator

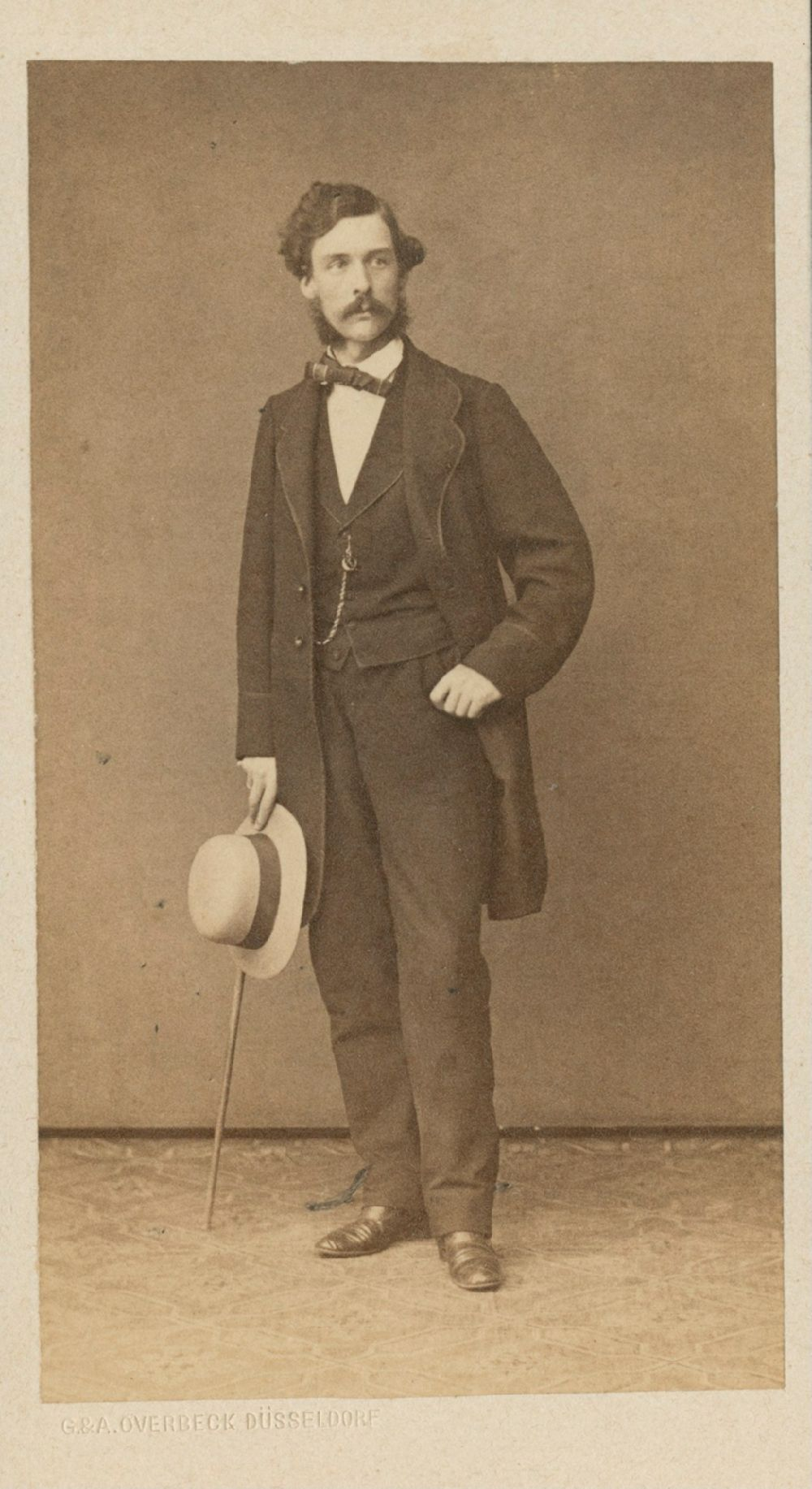
- Benjamin Vautier by G. & A. Overbeck (firm), c. 1868
- Born: Marc Louis Benjamin Vautier; 27 April 1829; Morges, Switzerland
- Died: 25 April 1898 (aged 68); Düsseldorf, Germany
- Education: Kunstakademie Düsseldorf
- Occupations: Genre painter, Illustrator

Marc Louis Benjamin Vautier (27 April 1829 – 25 April 1898) was a Swiss genre painter and illustrator.

== Early life and education ==
He was born in Morges. He was the son of a teacher and began his art studies in Geneva, then worked for two years as a jewelry enamel painter. In 1849, he obtained a position in the studios of history painter Jean-Léonard Lugardon. While there, he also took courses in anatomical drawing at a nearby art school.

== Work ==
He began attending the Kunstakademie Düsseldorf in 1849 and became a member of "Malkasten" (Paintbox), a local artists' association. He left the Academy for one year to work with Rudolf Jordan as a private student. Eventually, he decided to devote himself to depicting peasant life, which he observed for several years by visiting the Bernese Oberland.

In 1856 he went to Paris but returned to Düsseldorf a year later and painted his first peasant genre pictures. Initially, he focused on Switzerland, but finally decided to concentrate on the Black Forest region. He also worked as an illustrator (Der Oberhof by Karl Leberecht Immermann, Barfüßele by Berthold Auerbach, and others). Later, he became a Royal Professor at the Academy in Düsseldorf.

== Death ==
He died in 1898 in Düsseldorf.

== Gallery ==
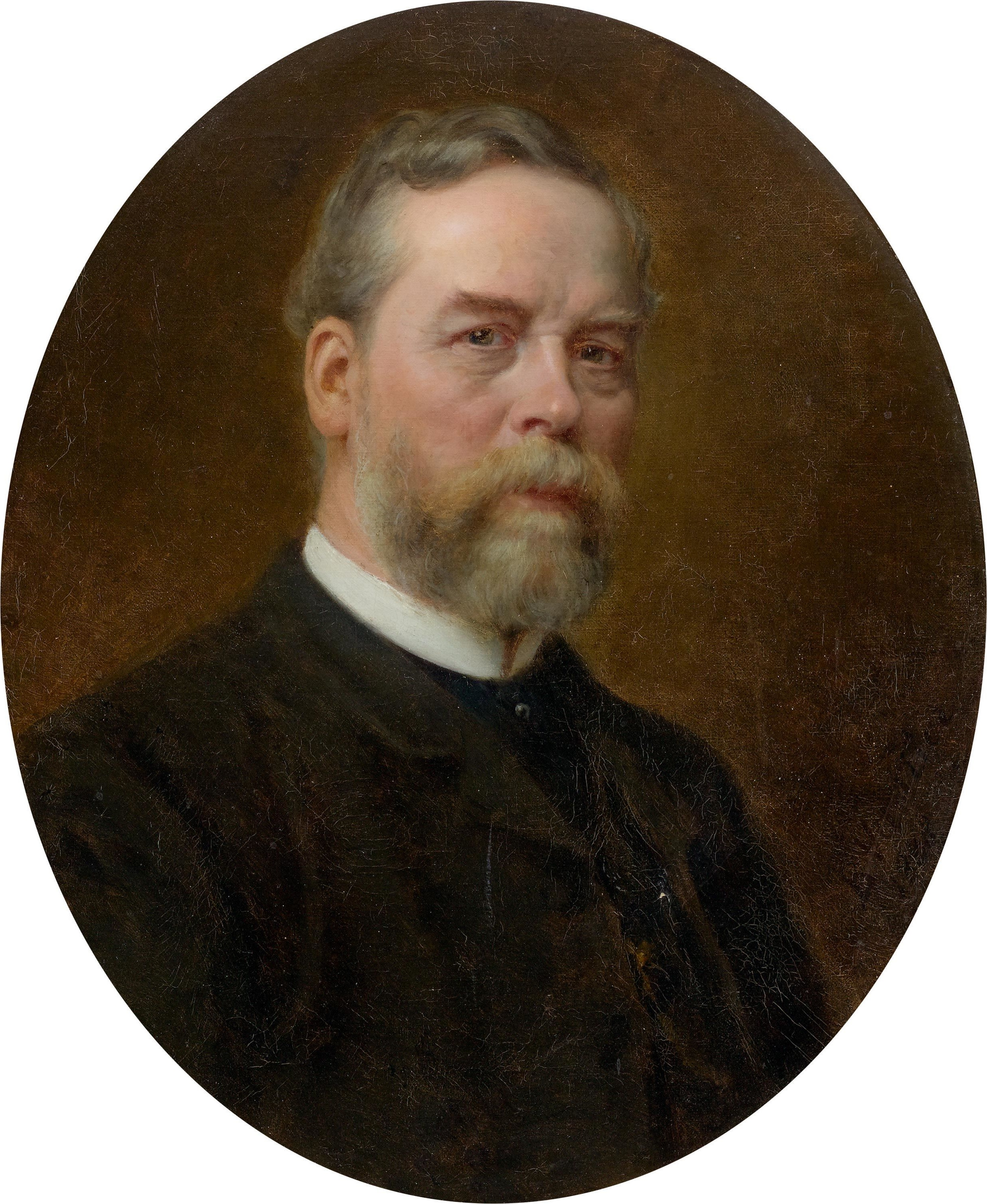
Vautier's Self-Portrait, 1888

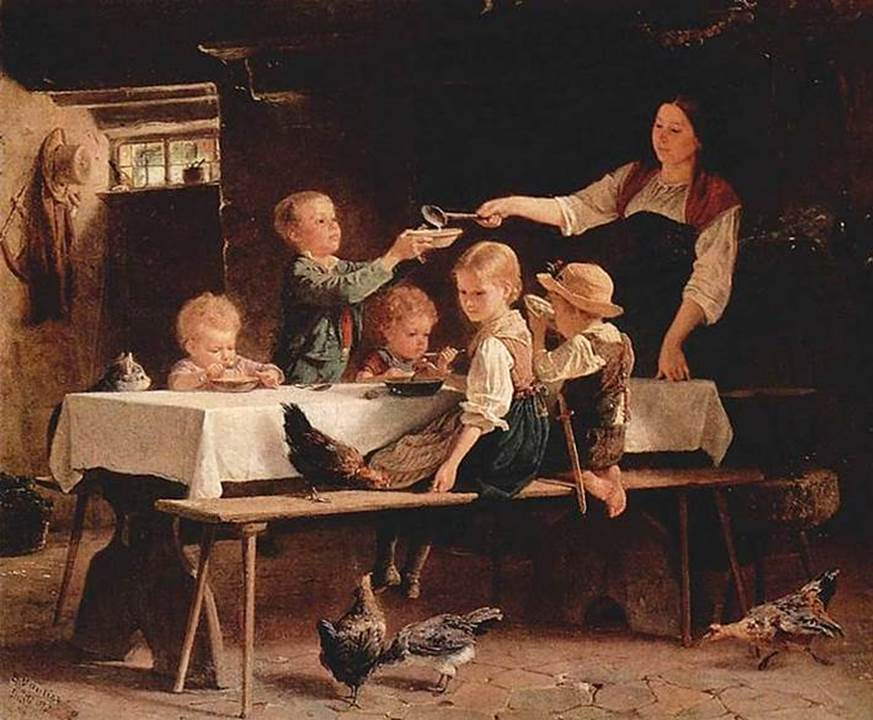
Kinder beim Mittagessen
(Children at Lunch, 1857)
