= Coinsins =

- Municipality
- Flag Coat of arms
- Location of Coinsins
- Location within Switzerland Location within Canton of Vaud
- Coordinates: 46°25′N 6°14′E
- Country: Switzerland
- Canton: Vaud
- District: Nyon

Government
  - Mayor: Syndic; Laurent Bardet

Area
  - Total: 2.90 km^{2} (1.12 sq mi)
- Elevation: 469 m (1,539 ft)

Population (2022)
  - Total: 499
  - Density: 172/km^{2} (446/sq mi)
- Demonym: Les Coinsinnois / Les Gremillettes
- Time zone: UTC+01:00 (CET)
  - Summer (DST): UTC+02:00 (CEST)
- Postal code: 1267
- SFOS number: 5710
- ISO 3166 code: CH-VD
- Surrounded by: Duillier, Prangins, Vich, Genolier
- Website: www.coinsins.ch

Coinsins (French pronunciation: [kwɛ̃zɛ̃]) is a municipality in the district of Nyon in the canton of Vaud in Switzerland.

== History ==
Coinsins is first mentioned in 1212 as Quinsins. In 1296 it was mentioned as Cuynsins.

== Geography ==
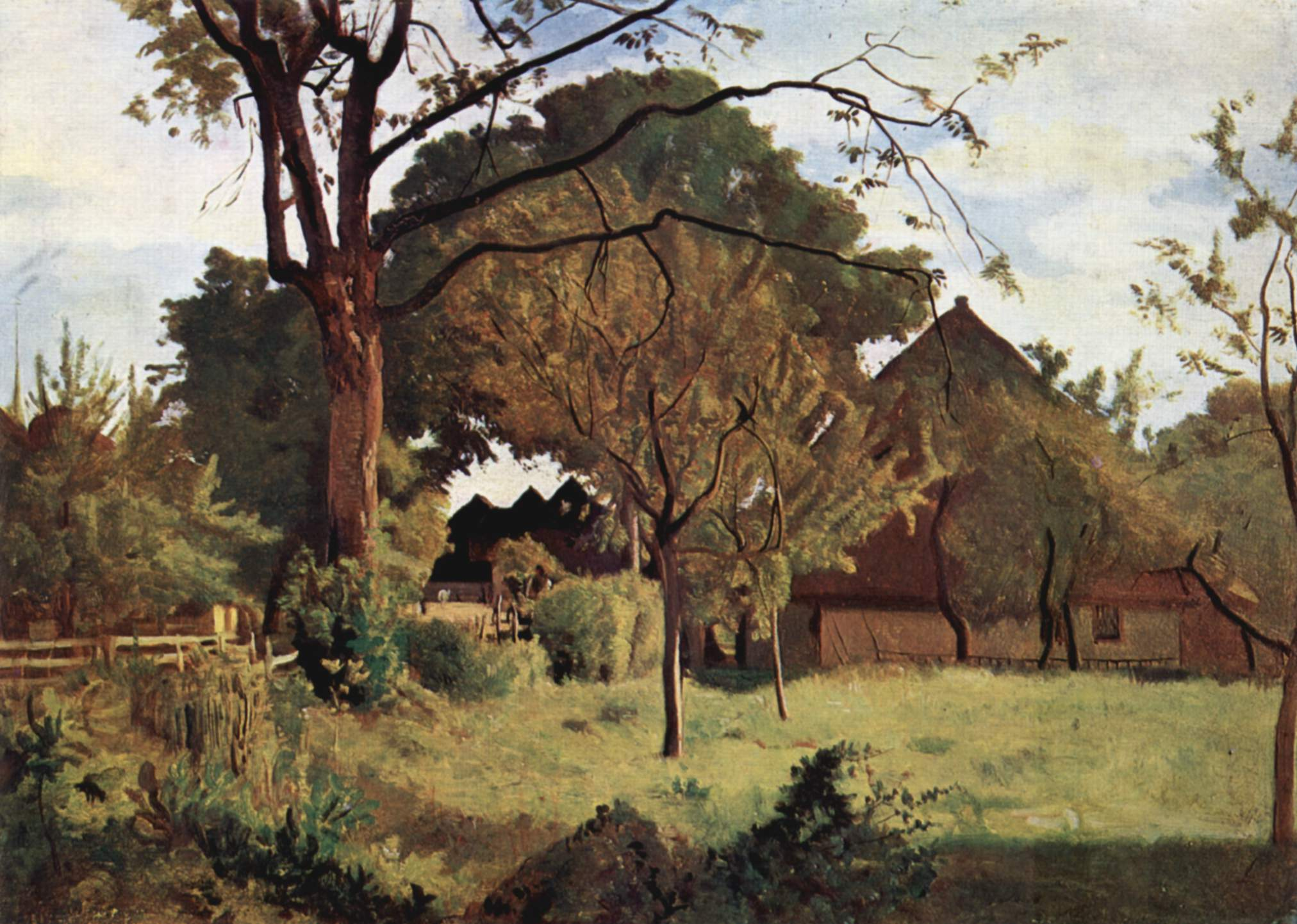
Barthélemy Menn: Farm near Coinsins, c. 1865

Coinsins has an area, as of 2009, of 2.9 square kilometers (1.1 mi^{2}). Of this area, 2.06 km^{2} (0.80 mi^{2}) or 70.8% is used for agricultural purposes, while 0.44 km^{2} (0.17 mi^{2}) or 15.1% is forested. Of the rest of the land, 0.4 km^{2} (0.15 mi^{2}) or 13.7% is settled (buildings or roads) and 0.04 km^{2} (9.9 acres) or 1.4% is unproductive land.

Of the built up area, housing and buildings made up 4.8% and transportation infrastructure made up 6.2%. Power and water infrastructure as well as other special developed areas made up 1.7% of the area Out of the forested land, 12.4% of the total land area is heavily forested and 2.7% is covered with orchards or small clusters of trees. Of the agricultural land, 48.5% is used for growing crops and 7.9% is pastures, while 14.4% is used for orchards or vine crops.

The municipality was part of the Nyon District until it was dissolved on 31 August 2006, and Coinsins became part of the new district of Nyon.

The municipality is located in the hills above Nyon.

== Coat of arms ==
The blazon of the municipal coat of arms is Azure, on a Bend Or a Lizard Vert.

== Demographics ==
Coinsins has a population (as of December 2020) of 509. As of 2008, 21.5% of the population are resident foreign nationals. Over the last 10 years (1999–2009 ) the population has changed at a rate of 8.4%. It has changed at a rate of 3.8% due to migration and at a rate of 5.1% due to births and deaths.

Most of the population (as of 2000) speaks French (288 or 78.3%), with English being second most common (27 or 7.3%) and German being third (23 or 6.3%). There are 10 people who speak Italian.

The age distribution, as of 2009, in Coinsins is; 52 children or 13.2% of the population are between 0 and 9 years old and 48 teenagers or 12.2% are between 10 and 19. Of the adult population, 40 people or 10.1% of the population are between 20 and 29 years old. 58 people or 14.7% are between 30 and 39, 65 people or 16.5% are between 40 and 49, and 48 people or 12.2% are between 50 and 59. The senior population distribution is 48 people or 12.2% of the population are between 60 and 69 years old, 23 people or 5.8% are between 70 and 79, there are 13 people or 3.3% who are between 80 and 89.

As of 2000, there were 147 people who were single and never married in the municipality. There were 194 married individuals, 16 widows or widowers and 11 individuals who are divorced.

As of 2000, there were 140 private households in the municipality, and an average of 2.5 persons per household. There were 35 households that consist of only one person and 4 households with five or more people. Out of a total of 145 households that answered this question, 24.1% were households made up of just one person. Of the rest of the households, there are 43 married couples without children, 55 married couples with children There were 4 single parents with a child or children. There were 3 households that were made up of unrelated people and 5 households that were made up of some sort of institution or another collective housing.

In 2000 there were 60 single family homes (or 62.5% of the total) out of a total of 96 inhabited buildings. There were 19 multi-family buildings (19.8%), along with 12 multi-purpose buildings that were mostly used for housing (12.5%) and 5 other use buildings (commercial or industrial) that also had some housing (5.2%).

In 2000, a total of 134 apartments (85.9% of the total) were permanently occupied, while 20 apartments (12.8%) were seasonally occupied and 2 apartments (1.3%) were empty. As of 2009, the construction rate of new housing units was 0 new units per 1000 residents. The vacancy rate for the municipality, in 2010, was 0%.

The historical population is given in the following chart:

== Politics ==
In the 2007 federal election the most popular party was the SVP which received 23.55% of the vote. The next three most popular parties were the SP (20.84%), the LPS Party (17.34%) and the Green Party (14.2%). In the federal election, a total of 113 votes were cast, and the voter turnout was 47.1%.

== Economy ==
As of 2010, Coinsins had an unemployment rate of 2.9%. As of 2008, there were 15 people employed in the primary economic sector and about 7 businesses involved in this sector. 92 people were employed in the secondary sector and there were 11 businesses in this sector. 84 people were employed in the tertiary sector, with 13 businesses in this sector. There were 215 residents of the municipality who were employed in some capacity, of which females made up 43.7% of the workforce.

In 2008 the total number of full-time equivalent jobs was 174. The number of jobs in the primary sector was 12, all of which were in agriculture. The number of jobs in the secondary sector was 87 of which 60 or (69.0%) were in manufacturing and 27 (31.0%) were in construction. The number of jobs in the tertiary sector was 75. In the tertiary sector; 44 or 58.7% were in wholesale or retail sales or the repair of motor vehicles, 19 or 25.3% were in the movement and storage of goods, 7 or 9.3% were in a hotel or restaurant, 1 was in the information industry, 1 was the insurance or financial industry, .

In 2000, there were 129 workers who commuted into the municipality and 162 workers who commuted away. The municipality is a net exporter of workers, with about 1.3 workers leaving the municipality for every one entering. About 14.0% of the workforce coming into Coinsins are coming from outside Switzerland. Of the working population, 12.1% used public transportation to get to work, and 64.2% used a private car.

== Religion ==
From the 2000 census, 120 or 32.6% were Roman Catholic, while 165 or 44.8% belonged to the Swiss Reformed Church. Of the rest of the population, there was 1 member of an Orthodox church, and there were 20 individuals (or about 5.43% of the population) who belonged to another Christian church. There were 2 (or about 0.54% of the population) who were Islamic. There were 3 individuals who were Buddhist. 55 (or about 14.95% of the population) belonged to no church, are agnostic or atheist, and 8 individuals (or about 2.17% of the population) did not answer the question.

== Education ==
In Coinsins about 152 or (41.3%) of the population have completed non-mandatory upper secondary education, and 75 or (20.4%) have completed additional higher education (either university or a Fachhochschule). Of the 75 who completed tertiary schooling, 44.0% were Swiss men, 24.0% were Swiss women, 24.0% were non-Swiss men and 8.0% were non-Swiss women.

In the 2009/2010 school year there were a total of 46 students in the Coinsins school district. In the Vaud cantonal school system, two years of non-obligatory pre-school are provided by the political districts. During the school year, the political district provided pre-school care for a total of 1,249 children of which 563 children (45.1%) received subsidized pre-school care. The canton's primary school program requires students to attend for four years. There were 32 students in the municipal primary school program. The obligatory lower secondary school program lasts for six years and there were 13 students in those schools. There was also 1 student who was home schooled or attended another non-traditional school.

As of 2000, there was one student in Coinsins who came from another municipality, while 55 residents attended schools outside the municipality.
