= Duillier Castle =

Castle in Duillier, Switzerland

- Duillier in Switzerland
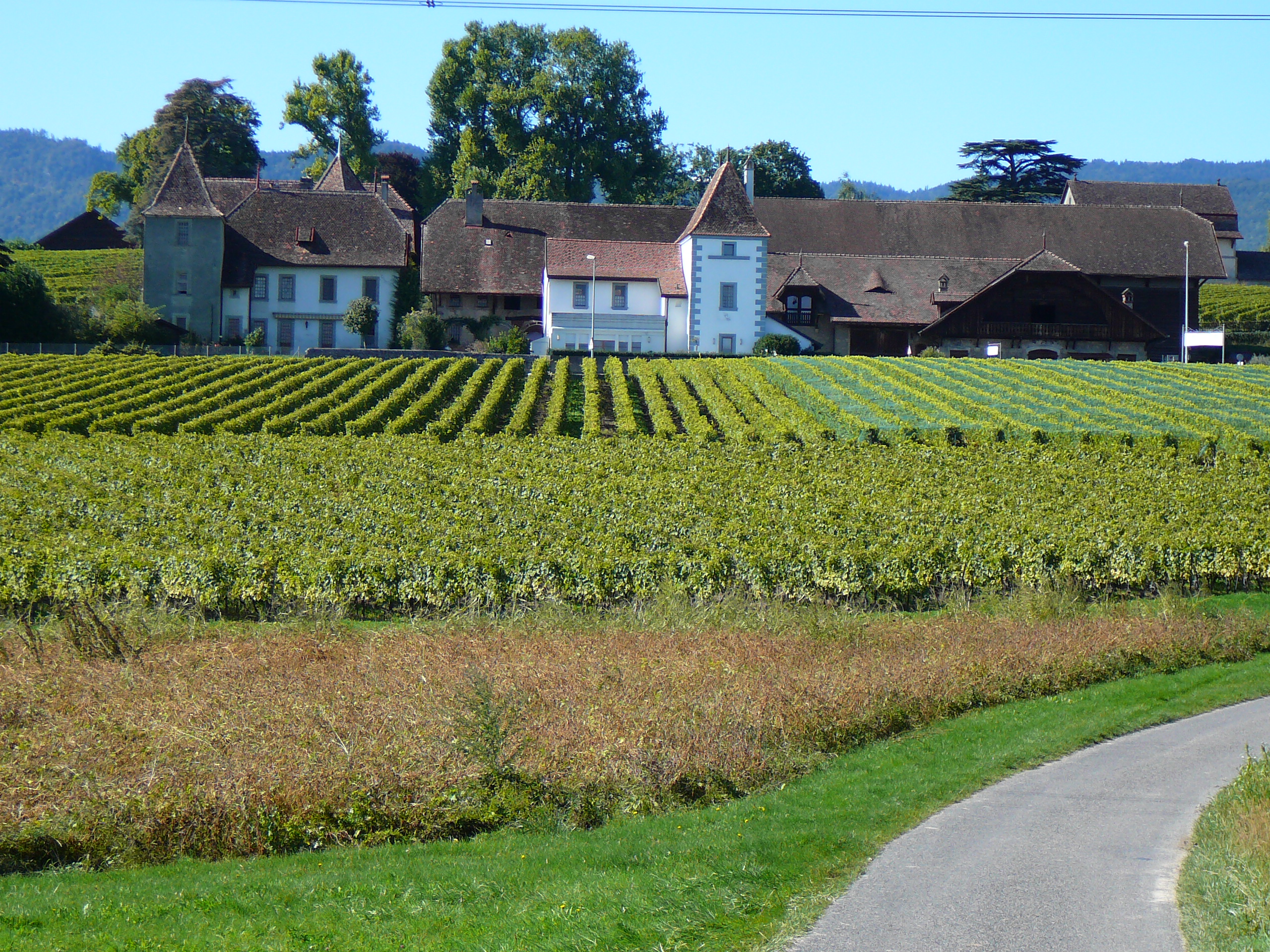
- Duillier Castle

Location
- Coordinates: 46°24′25″N 6°14′03″E

Swiss Cultural Property of National Significance

Duillier Castle is a castle in the municipality of Duillier of the Canton of Vaud in Switzerland. It is a Swiss heritage site of national significance.

== See also ==
- List of castles in Switzerland
- Château
