= Jean-Léonard Lugardon =

Swiss painter (1801–1884)

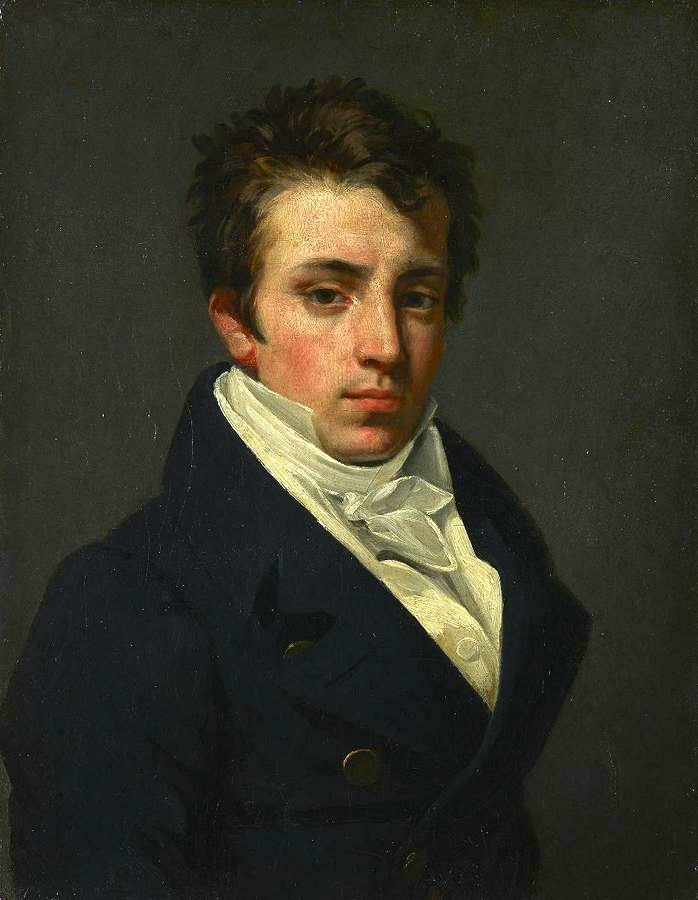
Jean-Léonard Lugardon; portrait by Joseph-Désiré Court

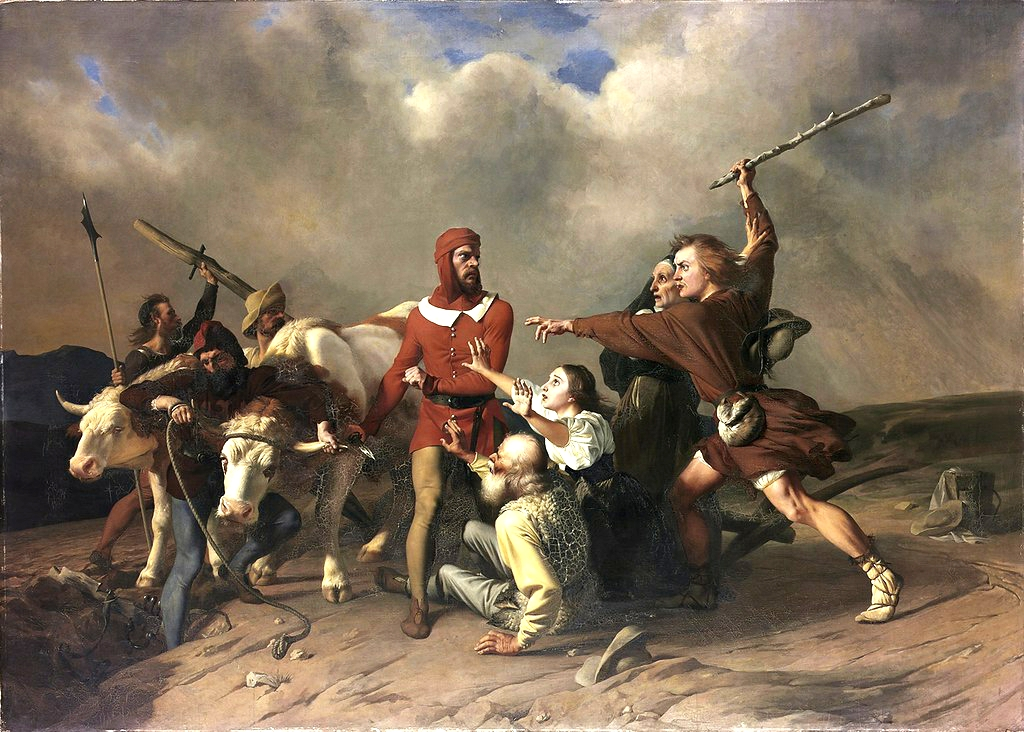
Arnold von Melchtal (attacked by men attempting to confiscate his oxen)

Jean-Léonard Lugardon (30 September 1801, in Geneva – 16 August 1884, in Geneva) was a Swiss painter of portraits, historical scenes and genre pieces.

== Life and works ==
His ancestors were Huguenots who had fled France, following the revocation of the Edict of Nantes. He was born to the watchmaker, Albert Lugardon, and his wife, Catherine, née Duboule. His training in art began at the Société des arts de Genève, where he won several prizes. From 1820 to 1822, he studied with Antoine-Jean Gros in Paris, and Jean-Auguste-Dominique Ingres in Florence. He worked there again, from 1823, when he held his first exhibition, to 1825. In 1824, Ingres encouraged him to enter a history painting competition in Geneva, which he won. After a brief return to Switzerland, occasioned by the death of his father, he was back in Italy, in Rome, from 1826 to 1829.

In 1826, he married Suzanne Paschoud, daughter of the printer and bookseller, Jean-Jacques Paschoud (1768-1826). The following year, she gave birth to their son, Albert (1827-1909), who also became a painter. She died while giving birth to a second child in 1830. He then returned to Geneva and began taking students: notably, Barthélemy Menn. After a successful showing at the Salon of 1835, he briefly returned to Paris.

From 1836 to 1843, he was the Director of the figure drawing school at the Société des Arts. He also served as a city Councilor, from 1837 to 1842.

In 1851, he went on an extended study trip to Algeria; making sketches. He presented his finished works at the Exposition Universelle (1855). During that same period, he had some creative disagreements with the Société and became one of the founding members of the Fine Arts division of the Geneva National Institute, a project of the radical politician, James Fazy.

In the late 1850s, his health began to decline, affecting his mental abilities, as well as physical. After that, he focused on presenting his existing works through the media of lithography and photography. From the late 1860s, he was essentially in retirement.
