= Edouard Vallet =

Swiss artist

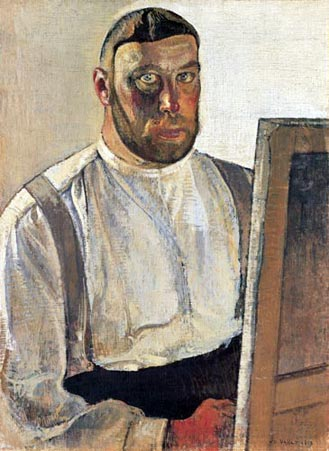
Edouard Valley, self-portrait, 1919

Édouard Eugène Francis Vallet (12 January 1876 - 1 May 1929) was a Swiss artist.

Born in Geneva to Francis Lucien Vallet and Rosalie Bouvier, Vallet went to a boarding school in France and apprenticed as a stonemason in 1892. He then went to the Geneva College of Fine Arts and studied woodcuts under Alfred Martin, Pierre Pignolat and Barthélemy Menn. He also travelled to Germany and Italy and held his first exhibition in 1899. He lived in the Swiss mountains in Valais, Savièse, Ayent, Hérémence, Vercorin and Sion from 1908 and painted portraits and landscapes from the region.

He married the painter Marguerite Gilliard, daughter of the artist Eugène Gilliard (1861-1921) and after her death in 1918, he married Marie Jollien (1886-1951). Vallet died in 1929 and is buried in the cemetery at Confignon.
