= Lausanne =

City in Switzerland

- Municipality
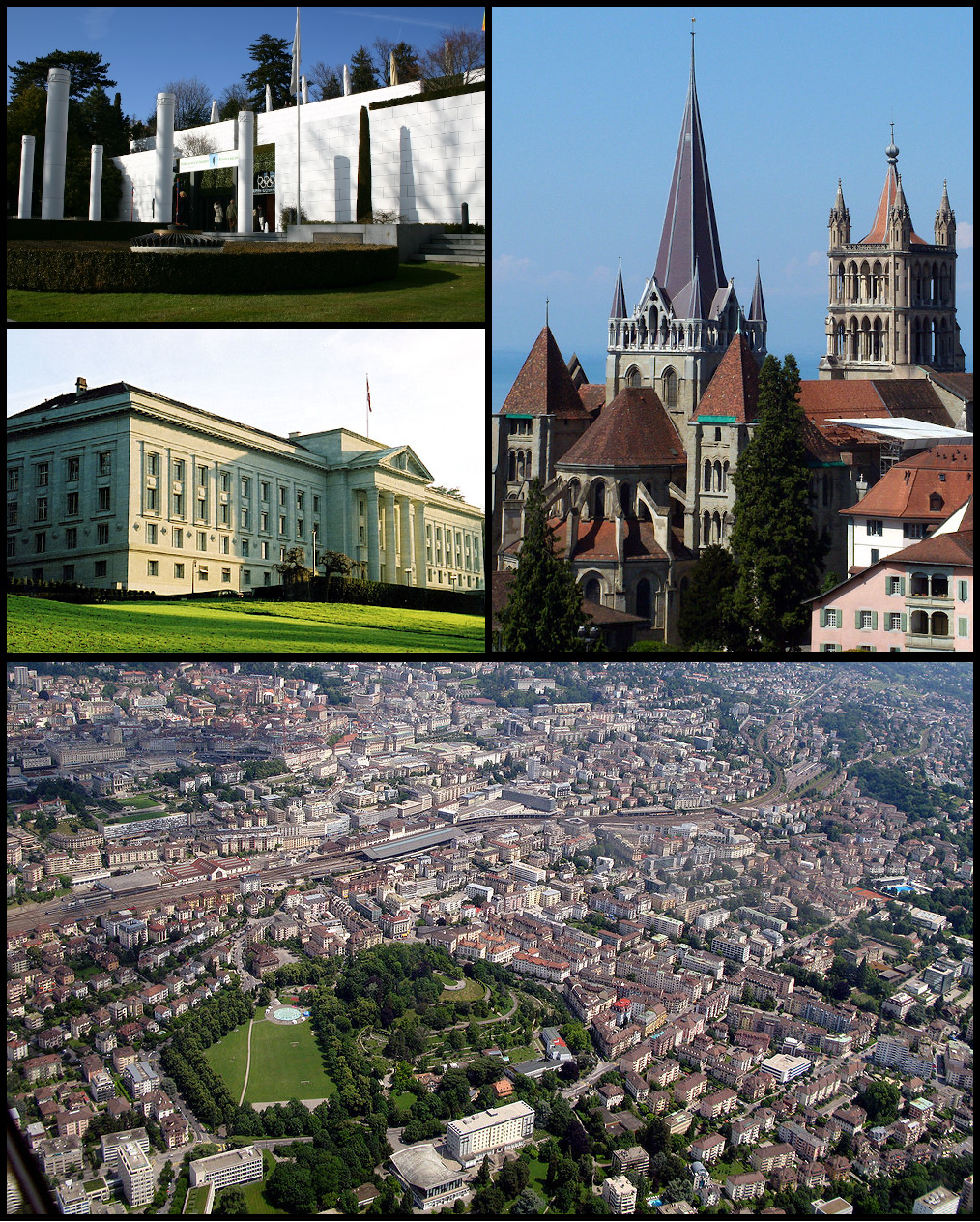
- From top to bottom; left to right: the Olympic Museum, the Cathedral of Lausanne, the Federal courts of Switzerland, aerial view of the city, and the park of Milan.

- Flag Coat of arms
- Location of Lausanne
- Location within Switzerland Location within Canton of Vaud
- Coordinates: 46°31′12″N 6°38′00″E
- Country: Switzerland
- Canton: Vaud
- District: Lausanne

Government
  - Executive: Municipalité with 7 members
  - Mayor: Syndic (list); Grégoire Junod SPS/PSS (as of 2016)
  - Parliament: Conseil communal with 100 members

Area
  - Total: 41.38 km^{2} (15.98 sq mi)
- Elevation (Cité): 526 m (1,726 ft)
- Highest elevation (Montagne du Château): 935 m (3,068 ft)
- Lowest elevation (Lake Léman): 372 m (1,220 ft)

Population (2024-12-31)
  - Total: 144,873
  - Density: 3,501/km^{2} (9,068/sq mi)
- Demonym: French: Lausannois(e)
- Time zone: UTC+01:00 (CET)
  - Summer (DST): UTC+02:00 (CEST)
- Postal codes: 1000 (in general), 1003–1007, 1010–1012, 1000 Lausanne 25–27, 1052 Le Mont-sur-Lausanne (partly), 1053 Cugy VD (partly), 1032 Crissier (partly), 1032 Romanel-sur-Lausanne (partly), 1033 Cheseaux-sur-Lausanne (partly)
- SFOS number: 5586
- ISO 3166 code: CH-VD
- Localities: Le Chalet-à-Gobet, Montblesson, Montheron, Ouchy, Vernand-Dessous, Vernand-Dessus, Vers-chez-les-Blanc
- Surrounded by: Bottens, Bretigny-sur-Morrens, Chavannes-près-Renens, Cheseaux-sur-Lausanne, Crissier, Cugy, Écublens, Épalinges, Évian-les-Bains (FR-74), Froideville, Jouxtens-Mézery, Le Mont-sur-Lausanne, Lugrin (FR-74), Maxilly-sur-Léman (FR-74), Montpreveyres, Morrens, Neuvecelle (FR-74), Prilly, Pully, Renens, Romanel-sur-Lausanne, Saint-Sulpice, Savigny
- Website: https://www.lausanne.ch/ Profile (in French), SFSO statistics

Logo of the city of Lausanne

Lausanne (/loʊˈzæn/ loh-ZAN, US also /loʊˈzɑːn/ loh-ZAHN; French: [lozan]) (Note: German: Lausanne [loˈzan]; Italian: Losanna [loˈzanna]; Romansh: Losanna [loˈzana]; Arpitan: Losena [lɔˈzəna].) is the capital and largest city of the Swiss French-speaking canton of Vaud, in Switzerland. The Olympic capital, it is a hilly city situated on the shores of Lake Geneva, about halfway between the Jura Mountains and the Alps, and facing the French town of Évian-les-Bains across the lake. Lausanne is 51.7 kilometres (32 miles) northeast of Geneva, the nearest major city. The Federal Supreme Court of Switzerland convenes in Lausanne, although it is not the de jure capital of the nation.

The municipality of Lausanne has a population of about 150,000, making it the fourth largest city in Switzerland after Basel, Geneva, and Zurich, with the entire agglomeration area having about 420,000 inhabitants (as of January 2019). The metropolitan area of Lausanne-Geneva (including Vevey-Montreux, Yverdon-les-Bains, Valais and foreign parts), commonly designated as Arc lémanique was over 1.3 million inhabitants in 2017 and is the fastest growing in Switzerland.

Initially a Celtic and Roman settlement on the shores of the lake, Lausanne became a town at the foot of Notre Dame, a cathedral built in the 12th century.

However, in the 20th century, Lausanne became a focus of international sport, hosting the International Olympic Committee (which has recognized the city as the "Olympic Capital" since 1994), the Court of Arbitration for Sport and some 55 international sport associations. It lies in a noted wine-growing region. With its 28-station metro system, Lausanne is the smallest city in the world to have a rapid transit system. Lausanne hosted the 2020 Winter Youth Olympics.

== Ancient history ==
The Romans built a military camp, which they called Lousanna, at the site of a Celtic settlement, near the lake where Vidy and Ouchy are situated; on the hill above was a fort called Lausodunon or Lousodunon (The "-y" suffix is common to many place names of Roman origin in the region (e.g.) Prilly, Pully, Lutry, etc.). By the 2nd century AD, it was known as vikanor[um] Lousonnensium and in 280 as lacu Lausonio. By 400, it was civitas Lausanna, and in 990 it was mentioned as Losanna.

During the decline and after the fall of the Western Roman Empire, insecurity in the mid to late 4th century AD forced the residents of Lausanne to move to its current centre, a hilly site that was easier to defend. The city which emerged from the camp was ruled by the County of Savoy and the Bishop of Lausanne.

From 888 to 1032, the initially relatively small town belonged to the Kingdom of Upper Burgundy. During the 11th century, Lausanne developed into a political, economic and religious center. The city became the center of the secular rule of the bishops. In the period that followed, especially in the 12th and 13th centuries, Lausanne flourished. Finally, in 1275, the Lausanne Cathedral was consecrated in the presence of Pope Gregory X and King Rudolf I of Germany.

== Membership of the Swiss Federation ==
It was invaded by forces from the canton of Bern and remained under their domination from 1536 to 1798. The iconoclastic Bernese stripped the Lausanne cathedral of its Roman Catholic trappings, and a number of its cultural treasures, including the hanging tapestries in the cathedral, were permanently removed. Lausanne has made repeated requests to recover them, but they never were returned. During this period, Lausanne experienced mixed fortunes, but did prosper from trade expansion, increased municipal wealth and landownership. This saw the rise of influential patrician families in the region, such as the Loys, Seigneux, de Praroman and de Saussure.

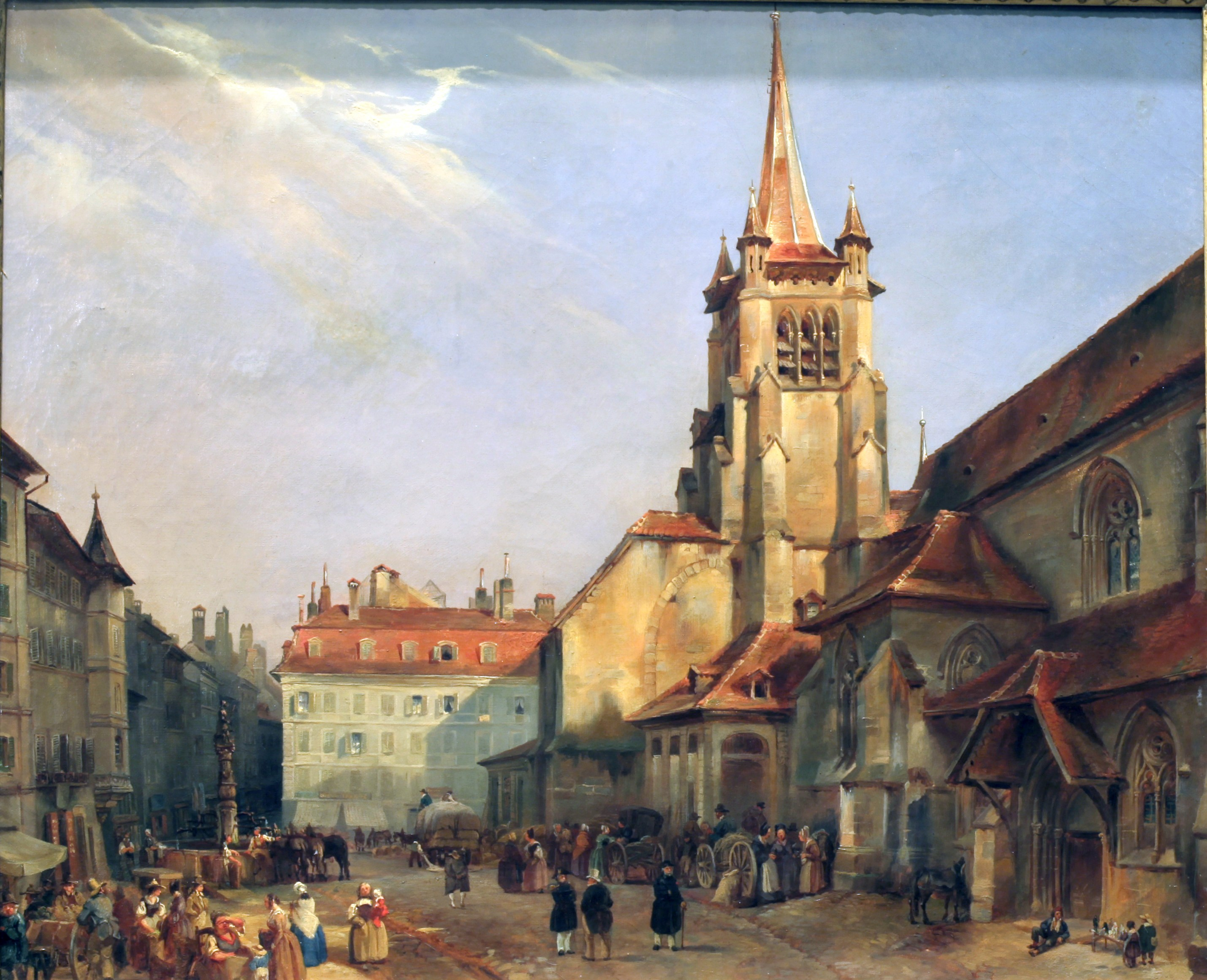
Saint-François Square, circa 1840

After the revocation of the Edict of Nantes in 1685, Lausanne became along with Geneva a place of refuge for French Huguenots. In 1729, a seminary was opened by Antoine Court and Benjamin Du Plan. By 1750, 90 pastors had been sent back to France to work clandestinely, this number would rise to 400. Official persecution ended in 1787. A faculty of Protestant theology was established at Montauban in 1808, and the Lausanne seminary was finally closed on 18 April 1812. During the Napoleonic Wars, the city's status changed. In 1803, it became the capital of a newly formed Swiss canton of Vaud under which the city of Lausanne joined the Swiss Federation.

== Modern history and heritage ==
In 1923, the city was the venue for the signing of the Treaty of Lausanne, which established the modern Turkish Republic. In 1964, the city played host to the Swiss National Exhibition, displaying its newly found confidence to play host to major international events. From the 1950s to 1970s, a large number of Italians, Spaniards and Portuguese immigrated to Lausanne, settling mostly in the industrial suburb of Renens.

The city has served as a refuge for European artists. While under the care of a psychiatrist at Lausanne, T. S. Eliot composed most of his 1922 poem The Waste Land ("by the waters of Leman I sat down and wept"). Ernest Hemingway also visited from Paris with his wife during the 1920s, to holiday. In fact, many creative people – such as historian Edward Gibbon and Romantic era poets Shelley and Byron – have sojourned, lived, and worked in Lausanne or nearby.

The city has been traditionally quiet, but in the late 1960s and early 1970s, a series of demonstrations took place that exposed tensions between young people and the police. In the early 1980s, the Lôzane Bouge protests demanded the city "open an autonomous centre, lower cinema ticket prices, liberalise cannabis and end the process of keeping records on homosexuals, all accompanied by leaflets, chants, and songs in the street". Protests occurred in 2003, against the G8 meetings.

In June 2022, Lausanne launched Plateforme 10, an art district comprising three museums. The trio of museums included Cantonal Museum of Fine Arts (MCBA), Photo Elysée, and the Museum of Contemporary Design and Applied Arts (MUDAC).

== Geography ==
=== Topography ===
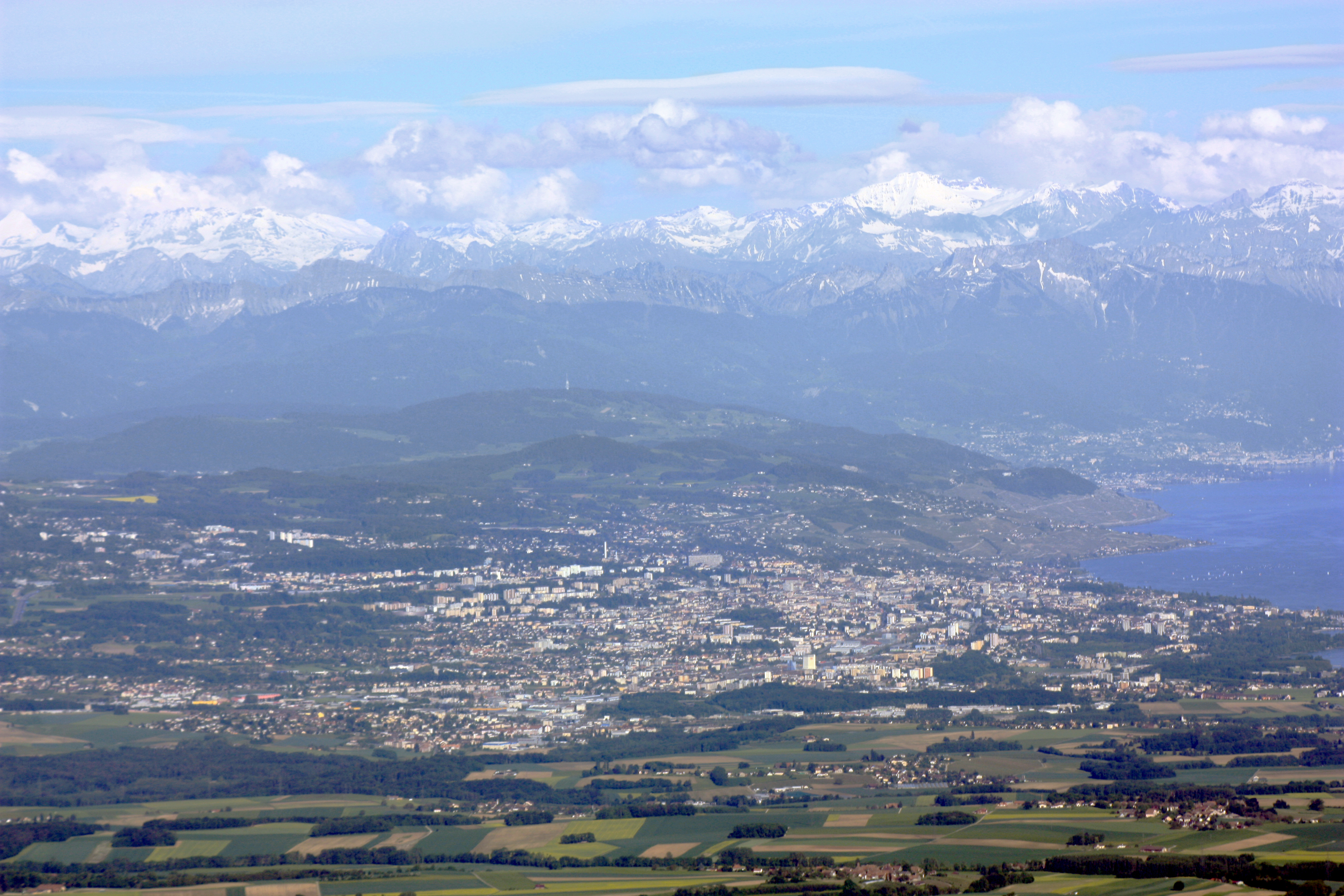
The agglomeration of Lausanne, Lake Geneva and the Alps

The most important geographical feature of the area surrounding Lausanne is Lake Geneva (Le Léman in French). Lausanne is built on the southern slope of the Swiss Plateau, with a difference in elevation of about 500 metres (1,640 ft) between the lakeshore at Ouchy and its northern edge bordering Le Mont-sur-Lausanne and Épalinges. Lausanne boasts a dramatic panorama over the lake and the Swiss and Savoyan Alps.

In addition to its generally southward-sloping layout, the centre of the city is the site of an ancient river, the Flon, which has been covered since the 19th century. The former river forms a gorge running through the middle of the city south of the old city centre, generally following the course of the present Rue Centrale, with several bridges crossing the depression to connect the adjacent neighbourhoods. Due to the considerable differences in elevation, tourists should make a note as to which plane of elevation they are on and where they want to go, otherwise they will find themselves tens of metres below or above the street in which they are trying to go. The name Flon is also used for the metro station located in the gorge.

The municipality includes the villages of Vidy, Cour, Ouchy, Mornex, Chailly, La Sallaz, Vennes, Montblesson, Vers-chez-les-Blanc, Montheron and Chalet-à-Gobet (871 m (2,858 ft)) as well as the exclave of Vernand.

Lausanne is located at the limit between the extensive wine-growing regions of Lavaux (to the east) and la Côte (to the west).

Lausanne has an area, as of 2014, of 41.38–41.37 square kilometers (15.98–15.97 sq mi) (depending on calculation method). Of this area, 6.22 km^{2} (2.40 sq mi) or 15.0% is used for agricultural purposes, while 16.06 km^{2} (6.20 sq mi) or 38.8% is forested. Of the rest of the land, 19.00 km^{2} (7.34 sq mi) or 45.9% is settled (buildings or roads), 0.08 km^{2} (20 acres) or 0.2% is either rivers or lakes and 0.01 km^{2} (2.5 acres) or 0.0% is unproductive land.

Of the built-up area, industrial buildings made up 1.6% of the total area while housing and buildings made up 22.8% and transportation infrastructure made up 12.4%. Power and water infrastructure as well as other special developed areas made up 1.6% of the area while parks, green belts and sports fields made up 7.4%. Out of the forested land, all of the forested land area is covered with heavy forests. Of the agricultural land, 9.4% is used for growing crops and 4.9% is pastures. All the water in the municipality is in lakes and streams.

The municipality was part of the old Lausanne District until it was dissolved on 31 August 2006, and it became the region capital of the new district of Lausanne.

=== Climate ===
Lausanne has an average of 119.7 days of rain or snow per year and on average receives 1,153 mm (45.4 in) of precipitation. The wettest month is May during which time Lausanne receives an average of 117 mm (4.6 in) of rain. During this month there is precipitation for an average of 12.1 days. The driest month of the year is February with an average of 67 mm (2.6 in) of precipitation over 8.8 days. The USDA Hardiness Zone for Lausanne-Pully is 8b with an average minimum temperature of −7.0 C over the past 20 years (1997–2016).

Climate data for Pully (Lausanne), elevation 456 m (1,496 ft), (1991–2020 normals, extremes 1981–2010)
Month	Jan	Feb	Mar	Apr	May	Jun	Jul	Aug	Sep	Oct	Nov	Dec	Year
Record high °C (°F)	14.9 (58.8)	15.8 (60.4)	22.6 (72.7)	25.5 (77.9)	31.3 (88.3)	33.6 (92.5)	35.2 (95.4)	37.1 (98.8)	28.6 (83.5)	25.4 (77.7)	19.8 (67.6)	17.7 (63.9)	37.1 (98.8)
Mean daily maximum °C (°F)	4.7 (40.5)	5.9 (42.6)	10.5 (50.9)	14.6 (58.3)	18.9 (66.0)	22.8 (73.0)	25.0 (77.0)	24.5 (76.1)	19.8 (67.6)	14.6 (58.3)	8.9 (48.0)	5.4 (41.7)	14.6 (58.3)
Daily mean °C (°F)	2.7 (36.9)	3.3 (37.9)	7.0 (44.6)	10.6 (51.1)	14.6 (58.3)	18.4 (65.1)	20.5 (68.9)	20.1 (68.2)	16.0 (60.8)	11.7 (53.1)	6.7 (44.1)	3.5 (38.3)	11.3 (52.3)
Mean daily minimum °C (°F)	0.7 (33.3)	0.8 (33.4)	3.7 (38.7)	6.8 (44.2)	10.7 (51.3)	14.3 (57.7)	16.2 (61.2)	16.2 (61.2)	12.7 (54.9)	9.1 (48.4)	4.5 (40.1)	1.5 (34.7)	8.1 (46.6)
Record low °C (°F)	−16.7 (1.9)	−12.7 (9.1)	−9.1 (15.6)	−2.9 (26.8)	2.1 (35.8)	5.2 (41.4)	9.0 (48.2)	8.2 (46.8)	4.4 (39.9)	−1.2 (29.8)	−6.2 (20.8)	−10.1 (13.8)	−16.7 (1.9)
Average precipitation mm (inches)	75.4 (2.97)	63.5 (2.50)	71.8 (2.83)	83.6 (3.29)	112.6 (4.43)	106.8 (4.20)	102.7 (4.04)	109.6 (4.31)	98.4 (3.87)	110.9 (4.37)	99.2 (3.91)	97.7 (3.85)	1,132.2 (44.57)
Average snowfall cm (inches)	10.9 (4.3)	14.3 (5.6)	1.6 (0.6)	0.2 (0.1)	0.0 (0.0)	0.0 (0.0)	0.0 (0.0)	0.0 (0.0)	0.0 (0.0)	0.0 (0.0)	1.1 (0.4)	7.0 (2.8)	35.1 (13.8)
Average precipitation days (≥ 1.0 mm)	9.8	8.5	9.0	9.2	11.7	9.9	9.6	9.5	8.9	10.3	10.4	10.9	117.7
Average snowy days (≥ 1.0 cm)	2.9	2.8	1.3	0.1	0.0	0.0	0.0	0.0	0.0	0.0	0.8	1.9	9.8
Average relative humidity (%)	78	73	68	64	67	66	64	67	73	78	79	79	71
Mean monthly sunshine hours	76.7	108.8	168.9	193.1	212.6	239.7	258.6	241.3	187.9	131.7	79.5	58.3	1,957.1
Percentage possible sunshine	29	39	48	50	49	55	59	59	53	41	30	23	47
Source 1: NOAA
Source 2: MeteoSwiss (snow 1981–2010) StatistiqueVaud

== Politics ==
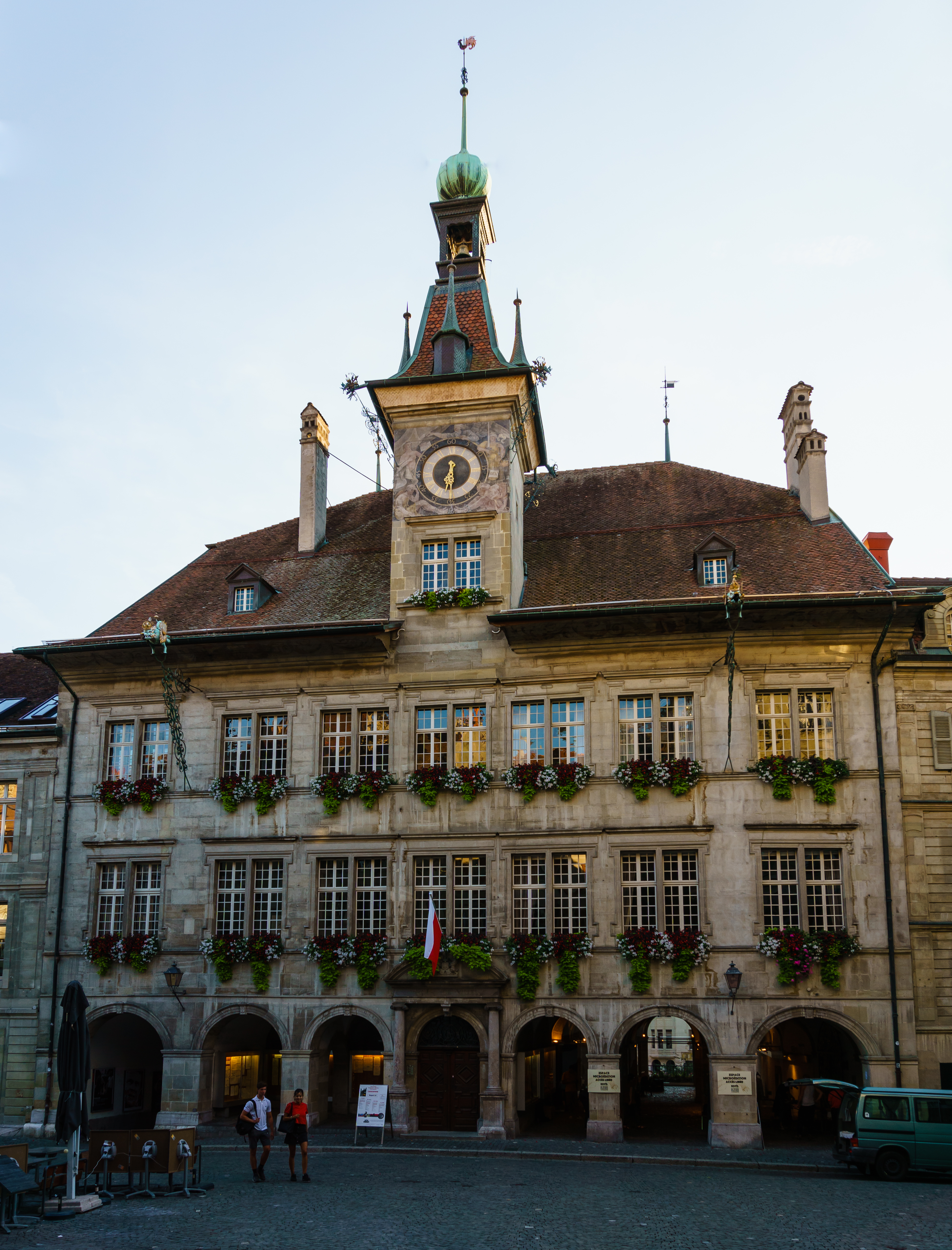
Townhall of Lausanne on the Place de la Palud

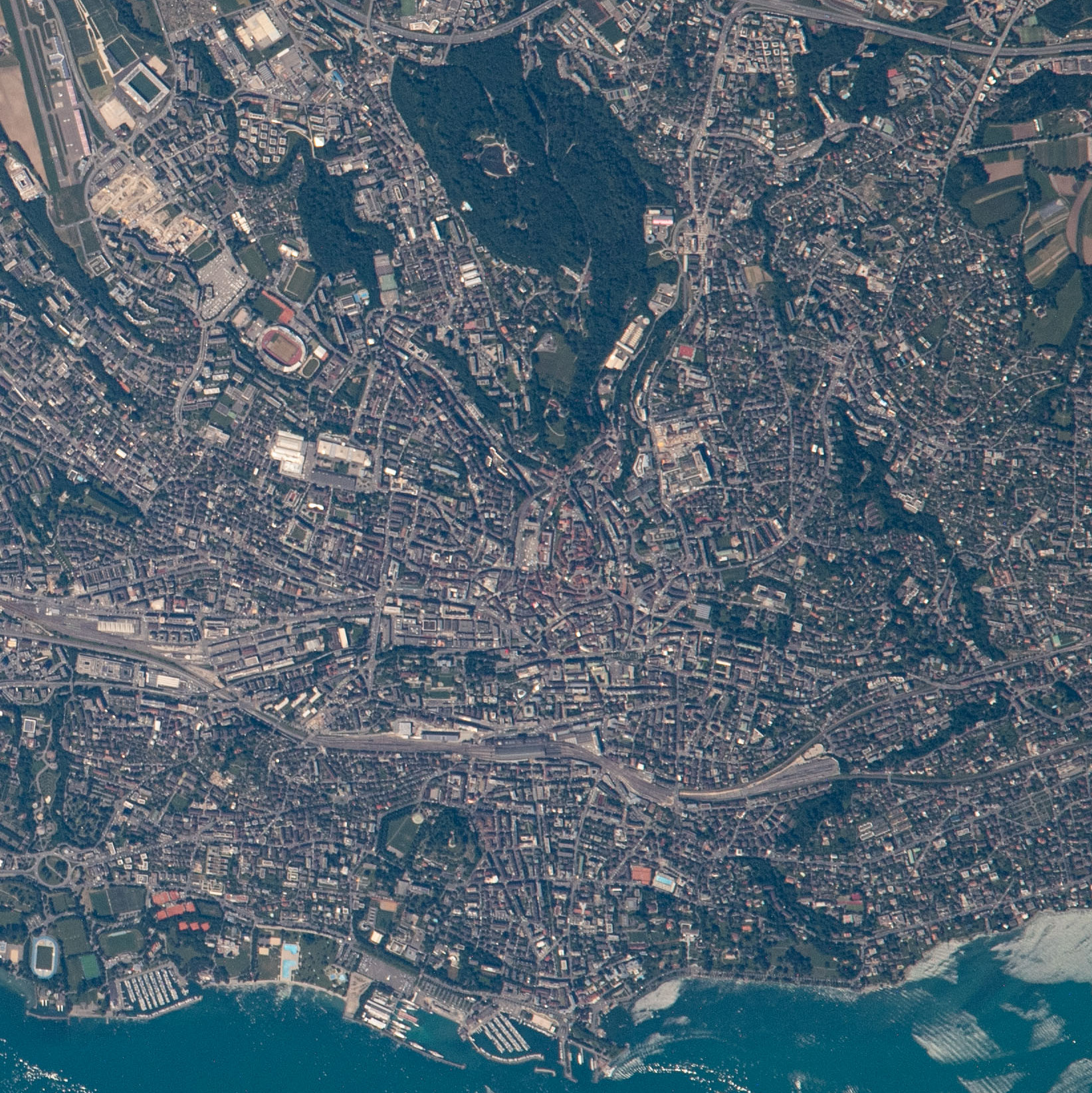
Aerial photo Lausanne.

=== Coat of arms ===
The blazon of the municipal coat of arms is Gules, chief argent.

=== Administrative divisions ===
The city is divided into 18 quartiers, or districts, sometimes composed of several neighborhoods. They are: Centre (1), Maupas/Valency (2), Sébeillon/Malley (3), Montoie/Bourdonnette (4), Montriond/Cour (5), Sous-Gare/Ouchy (6), Montchoisi (7), Florimont/Chissiez (8), Mousquines/Bellevue (9), Vallon/Béthusy (10), Chailly/Rovéréaz (11), Sallaz/Vennes/Séchaud (12), Sauvabelin (13), Borde/Bellevaux (14), Vinet/Pontaise (15), Bossons/Blécherette (16), Beaulieu/Grey/Boisy (17), and Les Zones foraines (90).

=== Government ===
The municipality (la Municipalité) constitutes the executive government of the City of Lausanne and operates as a collegiate authority. It is composed of seven councilors (French: conseiller municipal/conseillère municipale), each presiding over a directorate. One of the members act as mayor (syndic). In the mandate period 2021–2026 (la législature) the Municipality is presided by le Syndic Grégoire Junod. Directoral tasks, coordination measures and implementation of laws decreed by the Communal Council are carried by the Municipality. The regular election of the Municipality by any inhabitant valid to vote is held every five years. Any resident of Lausanne allowed to vote can be elected as a member of the Municipality. Since 14 April 2003, due to the constitution by canton of Vaud not only Swiss citizen have the right to vote and elect and being elected on communal level, but also foreigners with a residence permit of at least 10 years in Switzerland and 3 years in the canton of Vaud. The current mandate period is from 1 June 2021 to 30 May 2026. The delegates are elected by means of a system of Majorz. The mayor is later on elected as such by a public election as well by a system of Majorz, while the heads of the other departments are assigned by the collegiate. The executive body holds its meetings in the Town Hall (L'Hôtel de Ville), in the old city on Place de la Palud.

As of 2021, Lausanne's Municipality is made up of three representatives of the PS (Social Democratic Party, of whom one is also the mayor), and two members of PES (Green Party), and one each of le Parti Ouvrier et Populaire Vaudois (POP), and PLR (Les Libéraux-Radicaux (PLR)), giving the left parties a very strong six out of seven seats. The last regular election was held on 7 and 28 March 2021.

La Municipalité of Lausanne for the mandate period 2021–2026
Councilor (conseiller municipal/conseillère municipale)	Party	Directorate (Direction de(s), since) of	elected since
Grégoire Junod (Note: Mayor (Syndic))	Social Democrats	Culture and Urban Development (Culture et dévelopment urbain, 2016)	2011
Pierre-Antoine Hildbrand	FDP.The Liberals	Security and Economy (Sécurité et économie, 2016)	2016
Émilie Moeschler	Social Democrats	Sports and Social Cohesion (Sports et cohésion sociale, 2021)	2021
Natacha Litzistorf (Note: Vice-Mayor (Vice-syndique) 2022)	Greens	Housing, Environmental Development, and Building/Architecture (Logement, environnement et architecture, 2016)	2016
David Payot	Labour	Childhood, Youth, and Quarters (Enfance, jeunesse et quartiers, 2016)	2016
Florence Germond	Social Democrats	Finances and Mobility (Finances et mobilité, 2011)	2011
Xavier Company	Greens	Industrial Services (Services industriels, 2021)	2021

Simon Affolter is Town Chancellor (chancelier municipal) since and Patrizia Marzullo Darbellay is Deputy Town Chancellor since for the Municipality.

=== Parliament ===
Le Conseil communal of Lausanne for the mandate period of 2021–2026
1. Ensemble à Gauche (POP, Sol, indépendant.e.s) (13.0%)
2. PS (29.0%)
3. Les Verts (PES) (24.0%)
4. pvl) (6.00%)
5. PLR (21.0%)
6. UDC (7.00%)

The Communal Council (Conseil communal) holds legislative power. It is made up of 100 members, with elections held every five years. The Communal Council decrees regulations and by-laws that are executed by the Municipality and the administration. The sessions of the Communal Council are public. Unlike members of the Municipality, members of the Communal Council are not politicians by profession, and they are paid a fee based on their attendance. Any resident of Lausanne allowed to vote can be elected as a member of the Communal Council. Since 14 April 2003, due to the constitution by canton of Vaud not only Swiss citizen have the right to vote and elect and being elected on communal level, but also foreigners with a residence permit of at least 10 years in Switzerland and 3 years in the canton of Vaud. The Parliament holds its meetings in the Town Hall (Hôtel de Ville), in the old city on Place de la Palud.

The last election of the Communal Council was held on 7 March 2021 for the mandate period (la législature) from 1 June 2021 to 31 May 2026. As of this election the Communal Council consist of 29 (-4) members of the Social Democratic Party (PS), 24 (+7) Green Party (PES), 21 (0) Les Libéraux-Radicaux (PLR), 13 (+2) Ensemble à Gauche (an alliance of the left parties POP (Parti Suisse du Travail – Parti Ouvrier et Populaire) and solidaritéS and indépendant.e.s), 7 (-5) Swiss People's Party (UDC), and 6 (0) members of the Green Liberal Party (pvl)).

=== Elections ===
==== National Council ====
In the 2019 federal election for the Swiss National Council the most popular party was the Green Party which received 27.3% (+11.4) of the vote. The next five most popular parties were the PS (26.7%, -4.2), PLR (15.1%, -3.6), the UDC (9.3%, -6), the POP/solidaritéS (9%, +1.9), the pvl (6.9%, +3.4). In the federal election a total of 26,070 votes were cast, and the voter turnout was 39.7%.

In the 2015 federal election for the Swiss National Council the most popular party was the PS which received 30.8% of the vote. The next three most popular parties were the PLR (18.7%), the Green Party (15.9%), and the UDC (15.4%). In the federal election, a total of 26,116 voters were cast, and the voter turnout was 41.0%.

=== Twin towns and sister cities ===
- Akhisar, Turkey
- Osijek, Croatia
- Pernik, Bulgaria

== Demographics ==
Largest groups of foreign residents (2013)
Nationality	Number	% total (foreigners)
Portugal	10,081	7.2 (17.2)
France	9,968	7.2 (17.0)
Italy	6,326	4.5 (10.8)
Spain	4,558	3.3 (7.8)
Kosovo	2,318	1.7 (4.0)
Germany	1,377	1.0 (2.4)
Turkey	934	0.7 (1.6)
United Kingdom	859	0.6 (1.5)
Brazil	840	0.6 (1.4)
Ecuador	828	0.6 (1.4)

Historical population
Year	Pop.	±%
1850	17,108	—
1860	20,515	+19.9%
1870	25,845	+26.0%
1880	29,356	+13.6%
1888	33,340	+13.6%
1900	46,732	+40.2%
1910	64,446	+37.9%
1920	68,533	+6.3%
1930	75,915	+10.8%
1941	92,541	+21.9%
1950	106,807	+15.4%
1960	126,328	+18.3%
1970	137,383	+8.8%
1980	127,349	−7.3%
1990	128,112	+0.6%
2000	124,914	−2.5%
2010	127,821	+2.3%
2020	140,202	+9.7%

Lausanne has a population (as of December 2020) of 140,202. As of 2013, 42% of the population were resident foreign nationals. Over the last 10 years (1999–2009) the population has changed at a rate of 9.9%. It has changed at a rate of 8.3% due to migration and at a rate of 2.6% due to births and deaths. The population of the greater Lausanne area (grand Lausanne) is 402,900 (as of December 2014).

Of the population in the municipality, 58% or 80,828 have a Swiss citizenship, while 16,908 or 12.1% are from Lausanne and still lived there in December 2013. There were 27,653 or 19.8% who are from somewhere else in the same canton, while 36,276 or 26.0% have a Swiss citizenship in another canton. 58,9562 or 42.0% have a foreign citizenship.

In 2000, most of the population spoke French (98,424 or 78.8%), with German being second most common (5,365 or 4.3%) and Italian being third (4,976 or 4.0%). There were 62 people who speak Romansh (0.05%).

In 2008 there were 840 live births to Swiss citizens and 623 births to non-Swiss citizens, and in same time span there were 862 deaths of Swiss citizens and 127 non-Swiss citizen deaths. Ignoring immigration and emigration, the population of Swiss citizens decreased by 22 while the foreign population increased by 496. There were 9 Swiss men and 57 Swiss women who emigrated from Switzerland. At the same time, there were 2230 non-Swiss men and 1802 non-Swiss women who immigrated from another country to Switzerland. The total Swiss population change in 2008 (from all sources, including moves across municipal borders) was an increase of 883 and the non-Swiss population increased by 2221 people. This represents a population growth rate of 2.6%.

The age distribution, as of 2009, in Lausanne is; 11,818 children or 9.4% of the population are between 0 and 9 years old and 12,128 or 9.7% are between 10 and 19. Of the adult population, 21,101 people or 16.8% of the population are between 20 and 29 years old. 22,158 people or 17.6% are between 30 and 39, 18,016 people or 14.4% are between 40 and 49, and 13,940 people or 11.1% are between 50 and 59. The senior population distribution is 11,041 people or 8.8% of the population are between 60 and 69 years old, 8,277 people or 6.6% are between 70 and 79, there are 5,896 people or 4.7% who are between 80 and 89, and there are 1,171 people or 0.9% who are 90 and older.

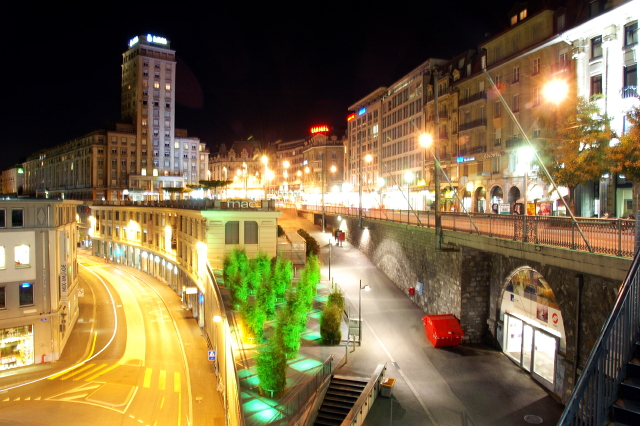
View from Rue du Grand-Pont

As of 2000, there were 58,100 people who were single and never married in the municipality. There were 48,990 married individuals, 7,797 widows or widowers and 10,027 individuals who are divorced.

As of 2000 the average number of residents per living room was 0.64 which is about equal to the cantonal average of 0.61 per room. In this case, a room is defined as space of a housing unit of at least 4 m^{2} (43.1 sq ft) as normal bedrooms, dining rooms, living rooms, kitchens and habitable cellars and attics. About 6.5% of the total households were owner occupied, or in other words did not pay rent (though they may have a mortgage or a rent-to-own agreement).

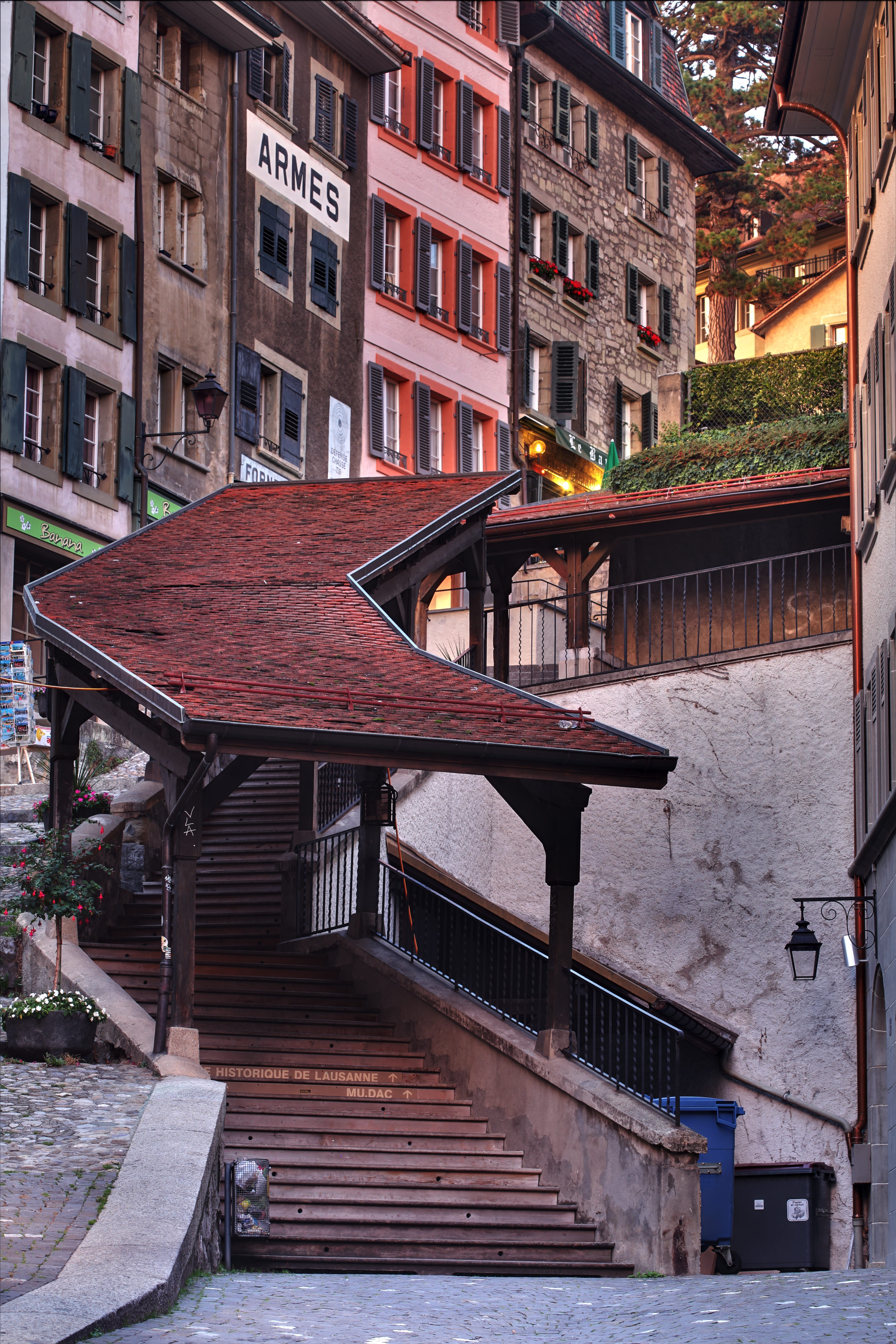
Stairs (escaliers du marché) in the old city

As of 2000, there were 62,258 private households in the municipality, and an average of 1.9 persons per household. There were 31,205 households that consist of only one person and 2,184 households with five or more people. Out of a total of 63,833 households that answered this question, 48.9% were households made up of just one person and there were 306 adults who lived with their parents. Of the rest of the households, there are 13,131 married couples without children and 11,603 married couples with children. There were 3,883 single parents with a child or children. There were 2,130 households that were made up of unrelated people, and 1,575 households that were made up of some sort of institution or another collective housing.

In 2000 there were 1,833 single family homes (or 23.1% of the total) out of a total of 7,925 inhabited buildings. There were 3,634 multi-family buildings (45.9%), along with 1,955 multi-purpose buildings that were mostly used for housing (24.7%) and 503 other use buildings (commercial or industrial) that also had some housing (6.3%). Of the single family homes 324 were built before 1919, while 153 were built between 1990 and 2000. The greatest number of single family homes (498) were built between 1919 and 1945. The most multi-family homes (933) were built before 1919 and the next most (906) were built between 1919 and 1945. There were 180 multi-family houses built between 1996 and 2000.

In 2000 there were 69,383 apartments in the municipality. The most common apartment size was 3 rooms of which there were 22,408. There were 9,579 single room apartments and 7,388 apartments with five or more rooms. Of these apartments, a total of 61,056 apartments (88.0% of the total) were permanently occupied, while 6,840 apartments (9.9%) were seasonally occupied and 1,487 apartments (2.1%) were empty. As of 2009, the construction rate of new housing units was 2.1 new units per 1000 residents.

As of 2003 the average price to rent an average apartment in Lausanne was 1064.08 Swiss francs (CHF) per month (US$850, £480, €680 approx. exchange rate from 2003). The average rate for a one-room apartment was 597.46 CHF (US$480, £270, €380), a two-room apartment was about 792.33 CHF (US$630, £360, €510), a three-room apartment was about 1044.64 CHF (US$840, £470, €670) and a six or more room apartment cost an average of 2024.55 CHF (US$1620, £910, €1300). The average apartment price in Lausanne was 95.3% of the national average of 1116 CHF. The vacancy rate for the municipality, in 2010, was 0.17%.

=== Historic population ===
The historical population is given in the following chart:

Historic population data
Year	Total population	French-speaking	German-speaking	Catholic	Protestant	Other	Jewish	Islamic	No religion given	Swiss	Non-Swiss
13th century	8,000–9,000										
1650–1680	c. 5,100										
1698	6,204										
1764	7,191										
1798	over 9,000										
1813	c. 13,000										
1850	17,108			970	16,101					16,023	1,085
1870	25,845			3,527	22,596					22,353	4,167
1888	33,340	25,750	5,704	4,575	28,431	1,034	184			28,205	5,135
1900	46,732	35,509	6,627	9,364	36,659	1,450	473			37,231	9,501
1910	64,446	46,293	9,669	15,597	46,166	3,167	989			48,647	15,799
1930	75,915	58,691	11,080	16,868	56,300	2,901	818			65,231	10,684
1950	106,807	88,226	12,403	27,218	75,559	2,349	1,009			97,119	9,688
1970	137,383	101,555	11,964	54,993	75,093	11,670	1,394	669	2,056	106,229	31,154
1990	128,112	95,455	6,799	56,464	48,496	19,103	919	2,775	14,548	88,905	39,207
2000	124,914	98,424	5,365	47,225	36,084	16,149	849	7,501	21,080	80,213	44,701

=== Religion ===
From the Reformation in the 16th century, the city was mostly Protestant until the late 20th century, when it received substantial immigration, particularly from largely Catholic countries. Catholics now form a plurality of the city's population. The Jewish community gathers at the Synagogue of Lausanne.

From the 2000 census, 47,225 people (37.8% of the population) were Roman Catholic, while 33,993 (27.2%) belonged to the Swiss Reformed Church. Of the rest of the population, there were 2,698 members of an Orthodox church (2.16%), there were 65 individuals (0.05%) who belonged to the Christian Catholic Church, and there were 4,437 individuals (3.55%) who belonged to another Christian church. There were 849 individuals (0.68%) who were Jewish, and 7,501 (6.00%) who were Muslim. There were 452 individuals who were Buddhist, 772 individuals who were Hindu and 343 individuals who belonged to another church. 21,080 (16.88%) belonged to no church, were agnostic or atheist, and 7,590 individuals (6.08%) did not answer the question.

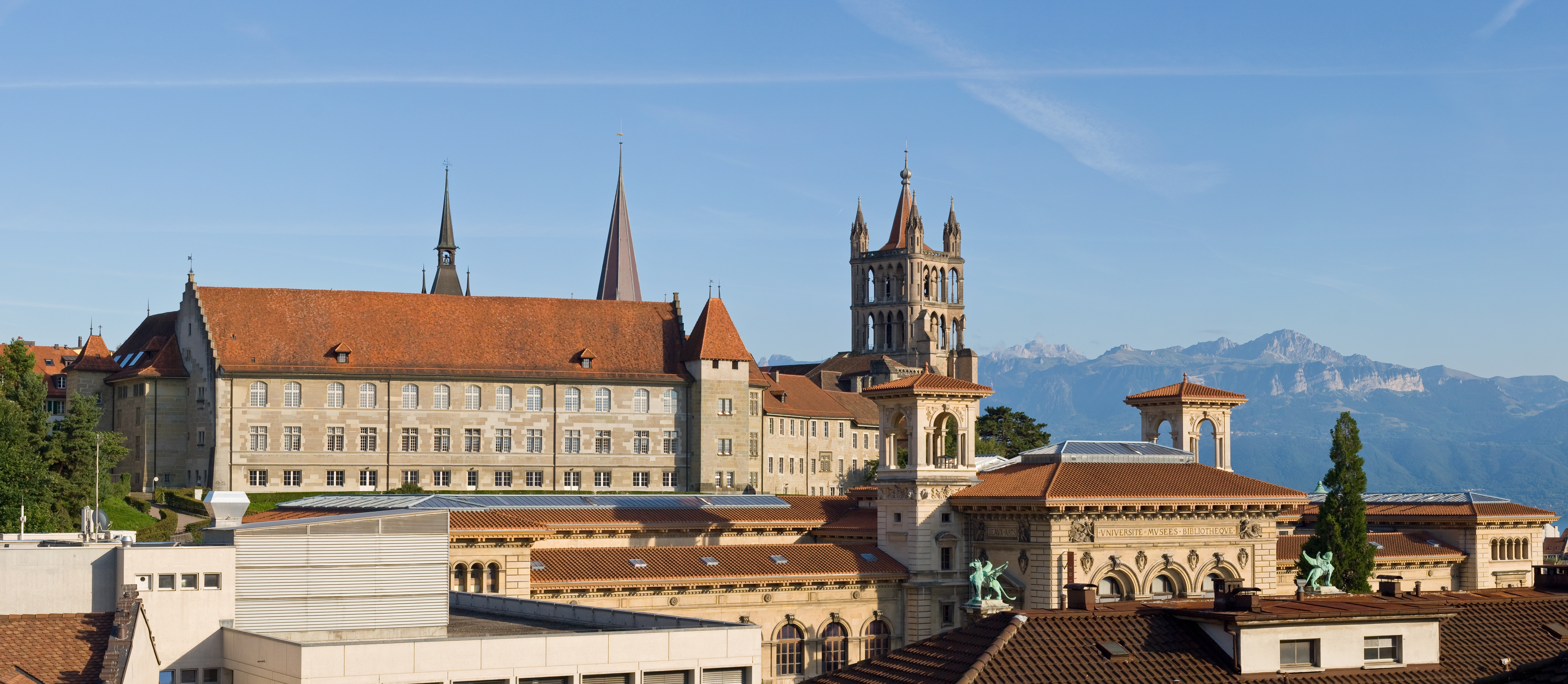
The Protestant Cathedral of Notre Dame dominates the Lausanne skyline (left: Old Academy, right: Palais de Rumine).

=== Crime ===
In 2014 the crime rate, of crimes listed in the Swiss Criminal Code, in Lausanne was 167.3 per thousand residents. During the same period, the rate of drug crimes was 49.5 per thousand residents, and the rate of violations of immigration, visa and work permit laws was 21 per thousand residents.

== Transport ==
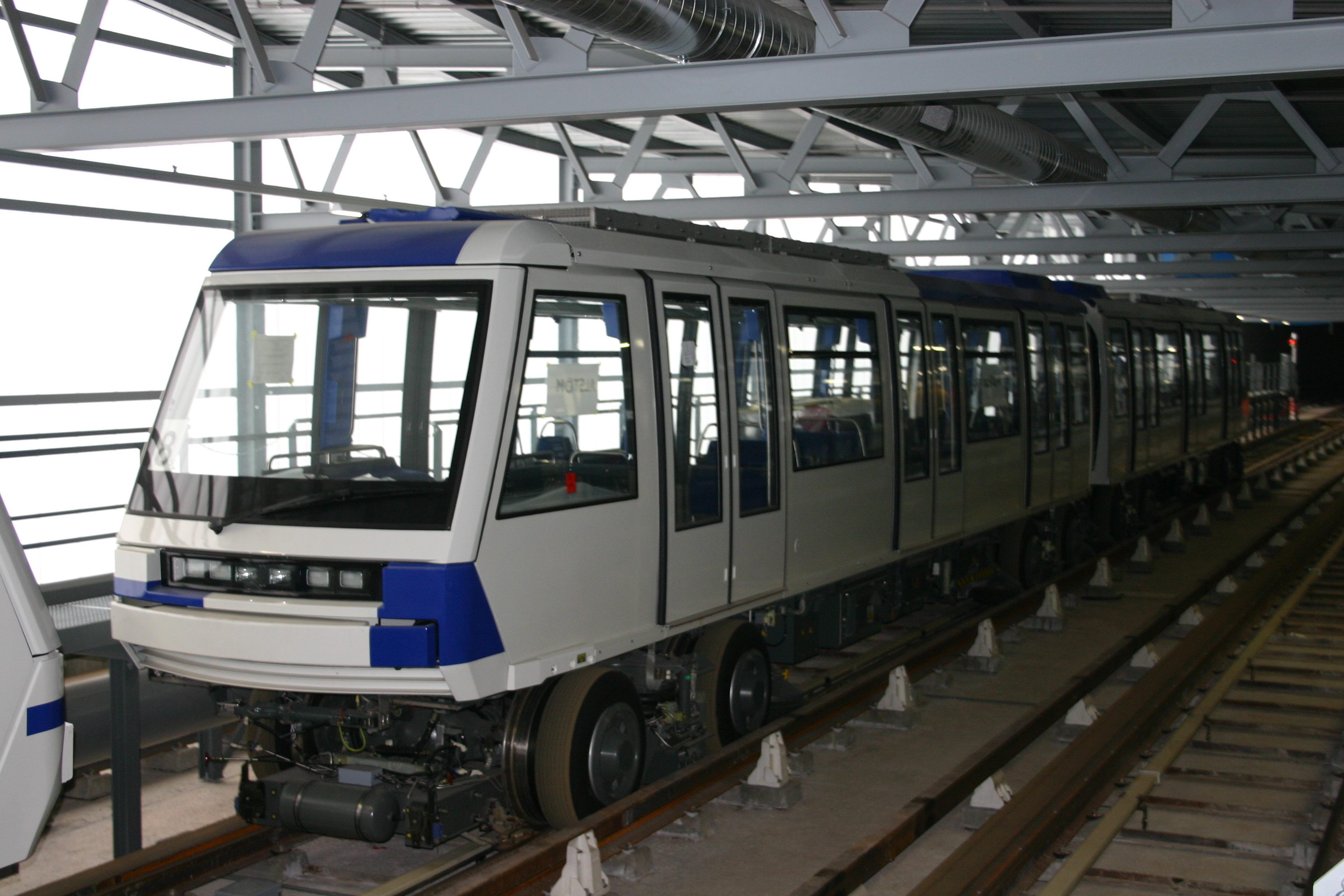
The Lausanne Metro is a rubber tyre metro system.

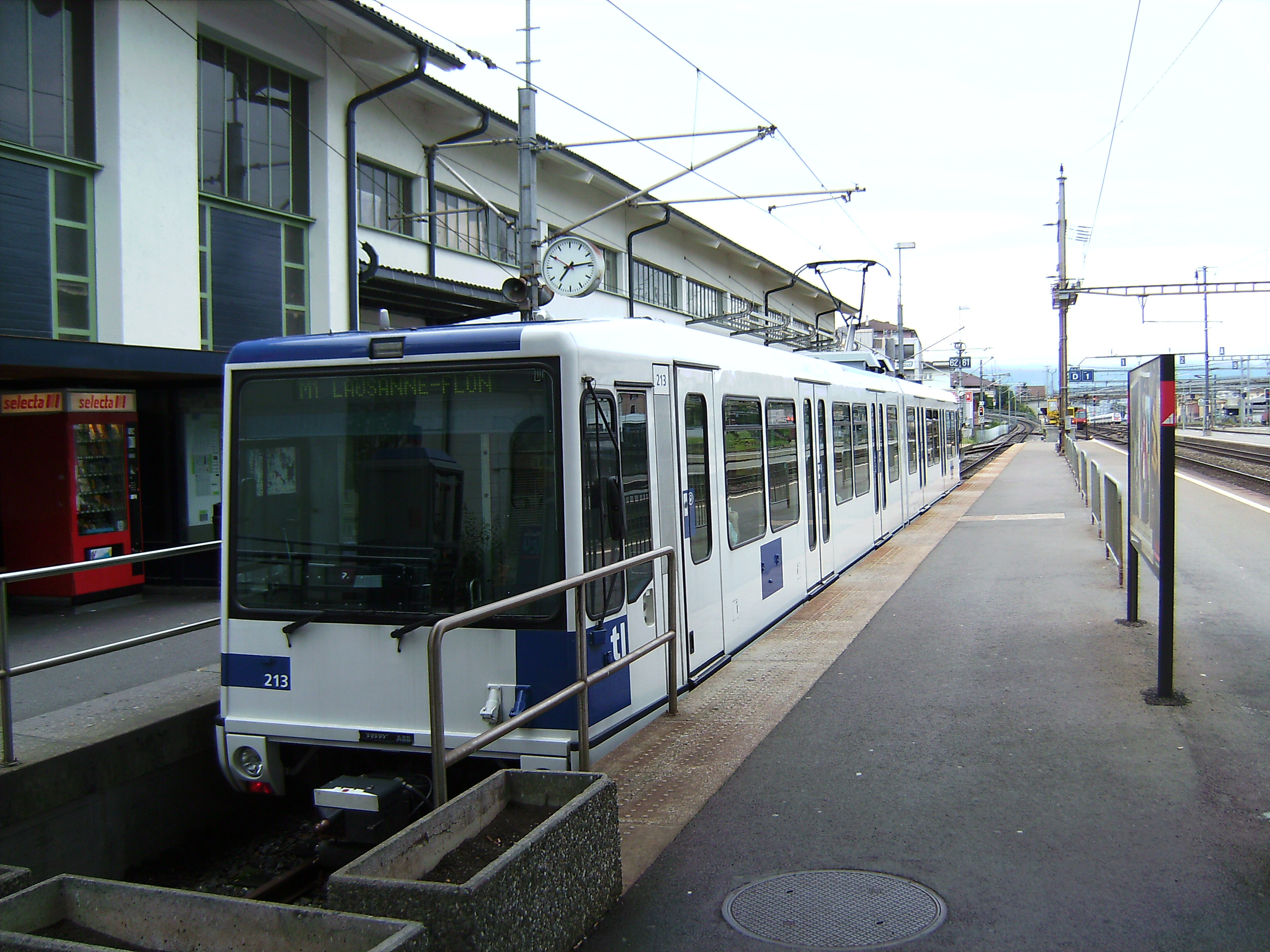
The Lausanne Metro Line 1 is completely on reserved track, single line, even underground.

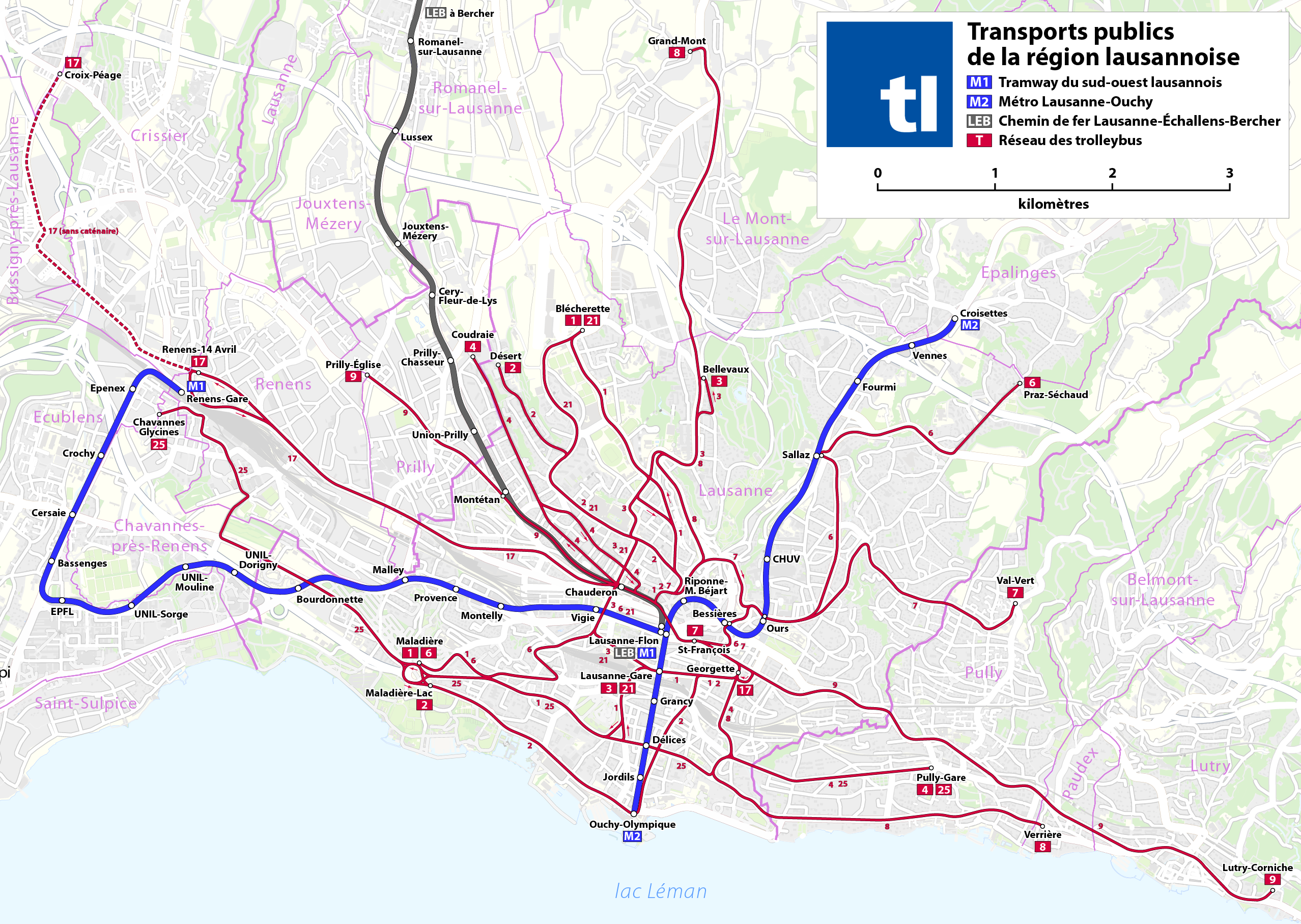
Public transport network

Lausanne is served by an extensive network of local, national and international public transport. National and international passenger trains of the Swiss Federal Railways depart from Lausanne railway station, which is also the hub of the RER Vaud commuter rail system, and a stop on the city's metro. The metro and local buses are operated by Transports publics de la région lausannoise (TL), with many routes run using trolleybuses. Additional commuter trains are run by the Lausanne–Echallens–Bercher railway (LEB) from Lausanne-Flon station. Ships across Lake Geneva are provided by the Compagnie Générale de Navigation sur le lac Léman (CGN).

Lausanne became the first city in Switzerland to have a rubber-tyred metro system, with the M2 line, which opened in October 2008. The rolling stock is a shorter version of the one used on Paris Métro Line 14. Further expansion of the system is planned as is the re-introduction of trams.

Lausanne is connected to the A1 motorway on its west side (Geneva – Zurich axis) and to the A9 on its north and east side (for transit with Italy and France); the interchange between these two motorways is on the north-west side of the city.

Lausanne Airport is located at Blécherette, and also houses a Boeing 737 Simulator. The city is also directly linked by train to the Geneva International Airport, four times an hour, in 42 min.

== Economy ==
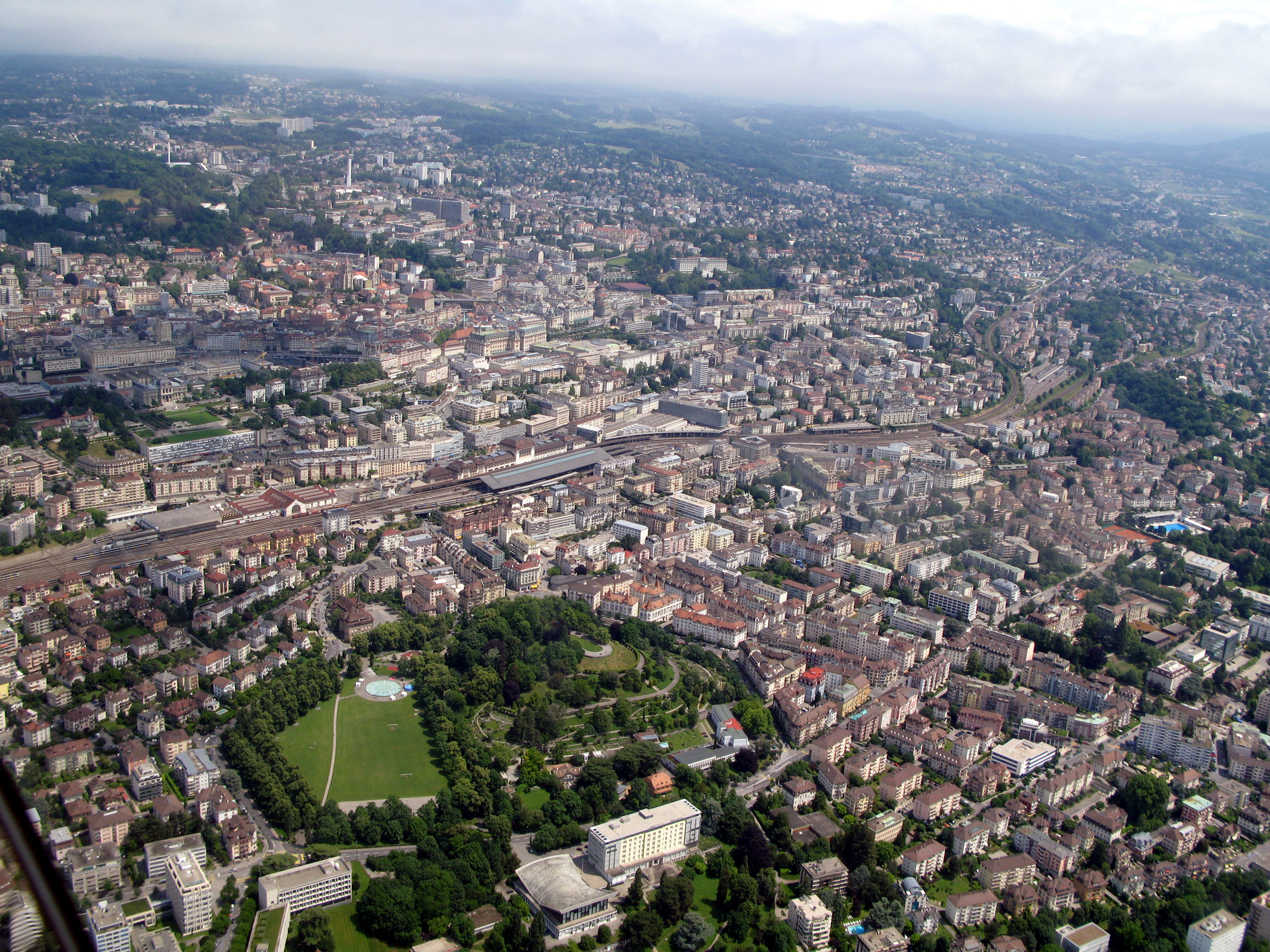
Aerial view of Lausanne (railway station in the centre and Parc de Milan at the bottom)

As of 2010, Lausanne had an unemployment rate of 8 percent. As of 2008, there were 114 people employed in the primary sector of the economy and about 25 businesses involved in this sector. 6,348 people were employed in the secondary sector of the economy and there were 698 businesses in this sector. 83,157 people were employed in the tertiary sector of the economy, with 6,501 active businesses in this sector.

There were 59,599 residents of the municipality who were employed in some capacity, of which women made up 47.4 percent of the workforce. As of 2008 the total number of full-time equivalent jobs was 75,041. The number of jobs in the primary sector was 93, of which 56 were in agriculture, 34 were in forestry or lumber production and 3 were in fishing or fisheries. The number of jobs in the secondary sector was 6,057 of which 1,515 or 25.0 percent were in manufacturing, 24 or 0.4 percent were in mining and 3,721 or 61.4 percent were in construction. The number of jobs in the tertiary sector was 68,891. In the tertiary sector 8,520 or 12.4 percent were employed in wholesale or retail sales or the repair of motor vehicles. 2,955 people or 4.3 percent were employed in the movement and storage of goods. Whereas 4,345 or 6.3 percent were employed in a hotel or restaurant. 4,671 people or 6.8 percent were employed in the information industry. The insurance or financial industry employed 6,729 people or 9.8 percent. 8,213 or 11.9 percent were employed as technical professionals or scientists. Furthermore 5,756 or 8.4 percent were working in education. Finally 14,312 people or 20.8 percent were working in health care.

As of 2000, there were 55,789 workers who commuted into the municipality and 19,082 workers who commuted away. The municipality is a net importer of workers, with about 2.9 workers entering the municipality for every one leaving. About 1.9 percent of the workforce coming into Lausanne are coming from outside Switzerland, while 0.1 percent of the locals commute out of Switzerland for work. Of the working population, 40.9 percent used public transportation to get to work, and 35.1 percent used a private car.

Large companies headquartered in Lausanne and its metropolitan area include:

- Banque Cantonale Vaudoise, banking
- Bata Corporation, shoe manufacturing
- Bobst SA, machinery
- Compagnie financière Tradition, financial services
- CGN, transportation
- Edipresse, publishing
- ELCA Informatique, IT
- Eni Suisse SA, oil & gas
- Kudelski Group, IT
- Landolt & Cie, banking
- Logitech, computer peripherals
- Nespresso, coffee (an operating unit of Nestlé)
- Payot, retail bookstore
- Philip Morris International, a tobacco company
- Retraites Populaires, financial services
- Sophia Genetics, biotechnology
- Tetra Laval, packaging; and
- Vaudoise Assurances, insurance

== Education ==
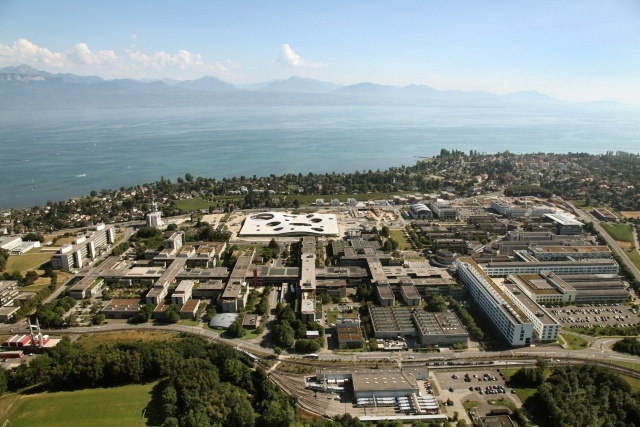
The École Polytechnique Fédérale de Lausanne (photo) and the University of Lausanne form a large campus near the lake Geneva.

In Lausanne about 40,118 or (32.1%) of the population have completed non-mandatory upper secondary education, and 22,934 or (18.4%) have completed additional higher education (either university or a Fachhochschule). Of the 22,934 who completed tertiary schooling, 38.7% were Swiss men, 31.3% were Swiss women, 17.1% were non-Swiss men and 12.9% were non-Swiss women.

In the 2009/2010 school year there were a total of 12,244 students in the Lausanne school district. In the Vaud cantonal school system, two years of non-obligatory pre-school are provided by the political districts. During the school year, the political district provided pre-school care for a total of 2,648 children of which 1,947 children (73.5%) received subsidized pre-school care. The canton's primary school program requires students to attend for four years. There were 6,601 students in the municipal primary school program. The obligatory lower secondary school program lasts for six years and there were 5,244 students in those schools. There were also 399 students who were home schooled or attended another non-traditional school.

Lausanne is home to several museums, including the Collection de l'art brut, the Espace Arlaud, the Fondation de l'Hermitage, the Musée cantonal d'archéologie et d'histoire, the Musée cantonal de géologie, the Musée cantonal de zoologie, the Cantonal Museum of Fine Arts, the Museum of Contemporary Design and Applied Arts, the Musée de l'Élysée and the Musée historique de Lausanne. In 2009 the Collection de l'art brut was visited by 27,028 people (the average in previous years was 33,356). The Espace Arlaud was visited by 9,222 people (the average in previous years was 14,206). The Fondation de l'Hermitage was visited by 89,175 people (the average in previous years was 74,839). The Musée cantonal d'archéologie et d'histoire was visited by 14,841 people (the average in previous years was 15,775). The Musée cantonal de zoologie was visited by 30,794 people (the average in previous years was 30,392). The Musée cantonal de géologie was visited by 28,299 people (the average in previous years was 24,248). The Cantonal Museum of Fine Arts was visited by 26,456 people (the average in previous years was 26,384). The Museum of Contemporary Design and Applied Arts was visited by 28,554 people (the average in previous years was 22,879). The Musée de l'Élysée was visited by 36,775 people (the average in previous years was 37,757). The Musée historique de Lausanne was visited by 23,116 people (the average in previous years was 22,851).

As of 2000, there were 12,147 students in Lausanne who came from another municipality, while 2,258 residents attended schools outside the municipality.

=== Libraries ===
Lausanne is home to eight large libraries or collections of libraries. These libraries include the Cantonal and University Library of Lausanne, the library of the Swiss Federal Institute of Technology in Lausanne (EPFL), the libraries of the Réseau EPFL, the Bibliothèque municipale de Lausanne, the Haute école de travail social et de la santé (EESP), the HECV Santé, the Haute école de la santé La Source and the École cantonale d'art de Lausanne (ECAL). There was a combined total (as of 2008) of 3,496,260 books or other media in the libraries, and in the same year a total of 1,650,534 items were loaned out.

=== Tertiary education ===
Lausanne enjoys some world class education and research establishments (see also Lausanne campus), including private schools, attended by students from around the world.

- Swiss Federal Institute of Technology in Lausanne (EPFL)
- University of Lausanne (UNIL)
  - HEC Lausanne, Faculty of Business and Economics of the University of Lausanne
- University Hospital of Lausanne (CHUV), a hospital centre with associated research
- École hôtelière de Lausanne (EHL)
- École cantonale d'art de Lausanne (ECAL)
- International Institute for Management Development (IMD)
- Swiss Graduate School of Public Administration (IDHEAP)
- AISTS ("International Academy of Sports Science and Technology")
- Business School Lausanne (BSL)
- The Lausanne campus of the University of the Nations
- Pepperdine University maintains an international study campus in Lausanne

=== Primary and secondary schools ===
International schools

- École française de Lausanne-Valmont
- Lycée Pareto (Italian school)
- Brillantmont International School
- International School of Lausanne
- Collège Champittet

Private schools

- École Vinet
- École Alphalif

== Culture and arts ==
=== Heritage sites of national significance ===
There are 46 buildings or sites that are listed as Swiss heritage sites of national significance. Additionally, the entire old city of Lausanne and the Vernand-Dessus region are listed in the Inventory of Swiss Heritage Sites.

- Religious Buildings: Notre-Dame Cathedral, Swiss Reformed Church of Saint-François, Swiss Reformed Church of Saint-Laurent and the Synagogue at Avenue de Florimont.
- Civic Structures: Former Hôpital at Rue Mercerie 24, Former Federal Tribunal, the Former Académie at Rue Cité-Devant 7, Casino de Montbenon, St-Maire Castle, Bois-de-Vaux Cemetery, Fondation de l'Hermitage and House de maître, Railway station, Beau-Rivage Palace, City Hall, Hôtel des Postes, Administration Building of André & Cie. S.A., Administration Building of the Vaudoise Assurances, Apartment and Office Building at Rue du Grand-Chêne 8, Les Bains de Bellerive, l'Estérel House, House at Chemin de Chandolin 4, the Mon-Repos estate at Parc de Mon-Repos, Olympic Museum and Archives of the International Olympic Committee, the vessels of the CGN (La Suisse (1910), Savoie (1914), Simplon (1920), Rhône (1927)), Pont Chauderon, the Vernand-Dessus rural site, Site de l'Expo 64 avec Théatre de Vidy, the Tour Bel-Air and the University Hospital of Lausanne (CHUV).
- Museums and Libraries: Former Residence of the Bishop of Lausanne which is now the Lausanne Museum of History, Bibliothèque des cèdres (former Bibliothèque des pasteurs), Beaulieu Castle and the Collection de l'art brut, Fondation Toms Pauli Collection de tapisseries and d'art textile, Galeries Saint-François, Musée de l'Élysée, Museum of Contemporary Design and Applied Arts (MUDAC), Cantonal Botanical Museum and Gardens, the Roman Museum, the Palais de Rumine with the Musée cantonal de géologie, Cantonal Museum of Zoology, Cantonal Museum of Fine Arts, Musée monétaire cantonal de Lausanne (Cabinet des médailles) and Musée cantonal d'archéologie et d'histoire.
- Archives: Archives of the Banque Vaudoise, Archives of the City of Lausanne, Archives of Énergie Ouest Suisse (EOS), the Radio Suisse Romande archives and the Federal Supreme Court of Switzerland with archives.
- Archeological sites: The Roman era/medieval hill-top city and the prehistoric settlement and Roman era Vicus of Vidy (Lousanna).
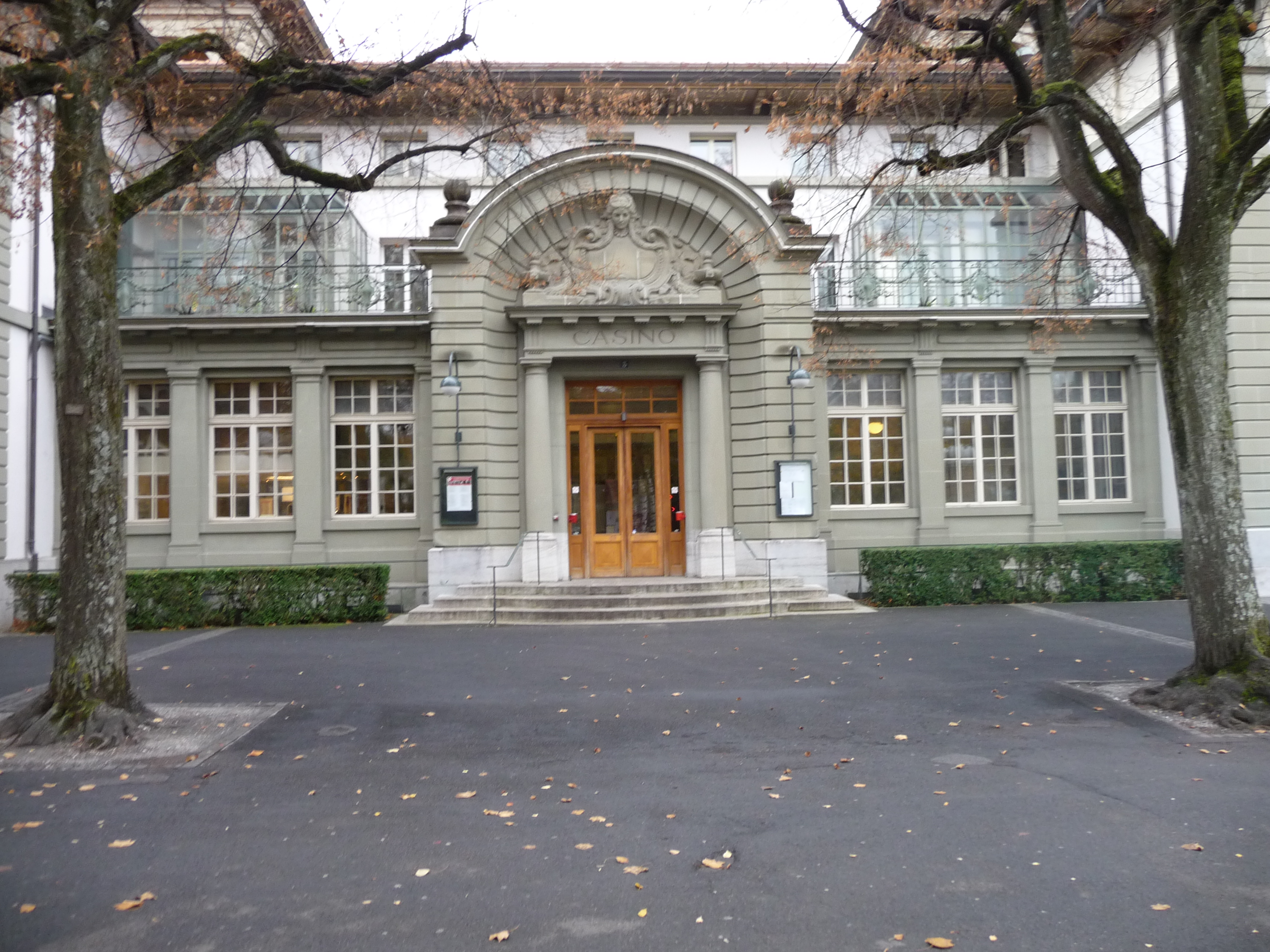
The Casino de Montbenon

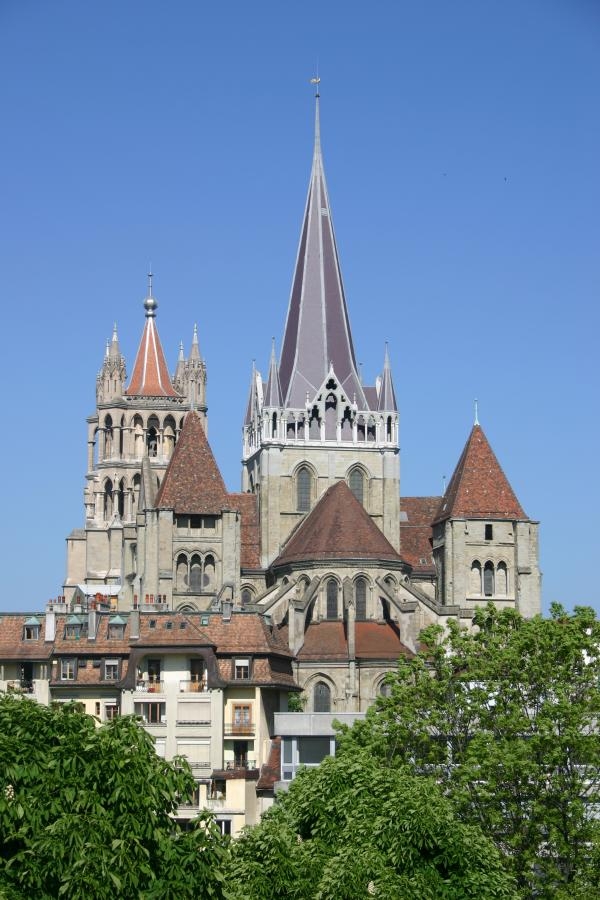
Lausanne Cathedral

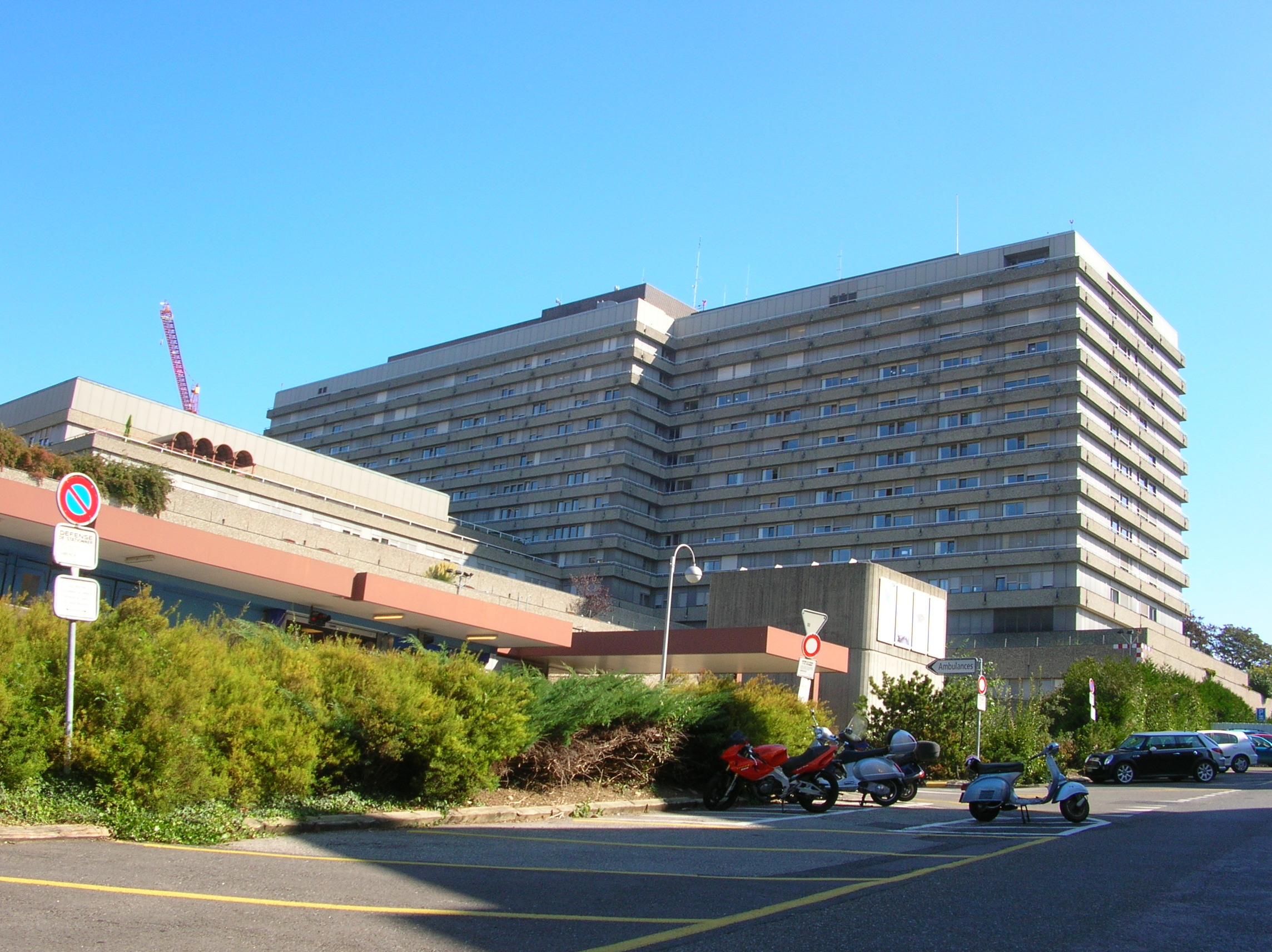
University Hospital of Lausanne (CHUV)

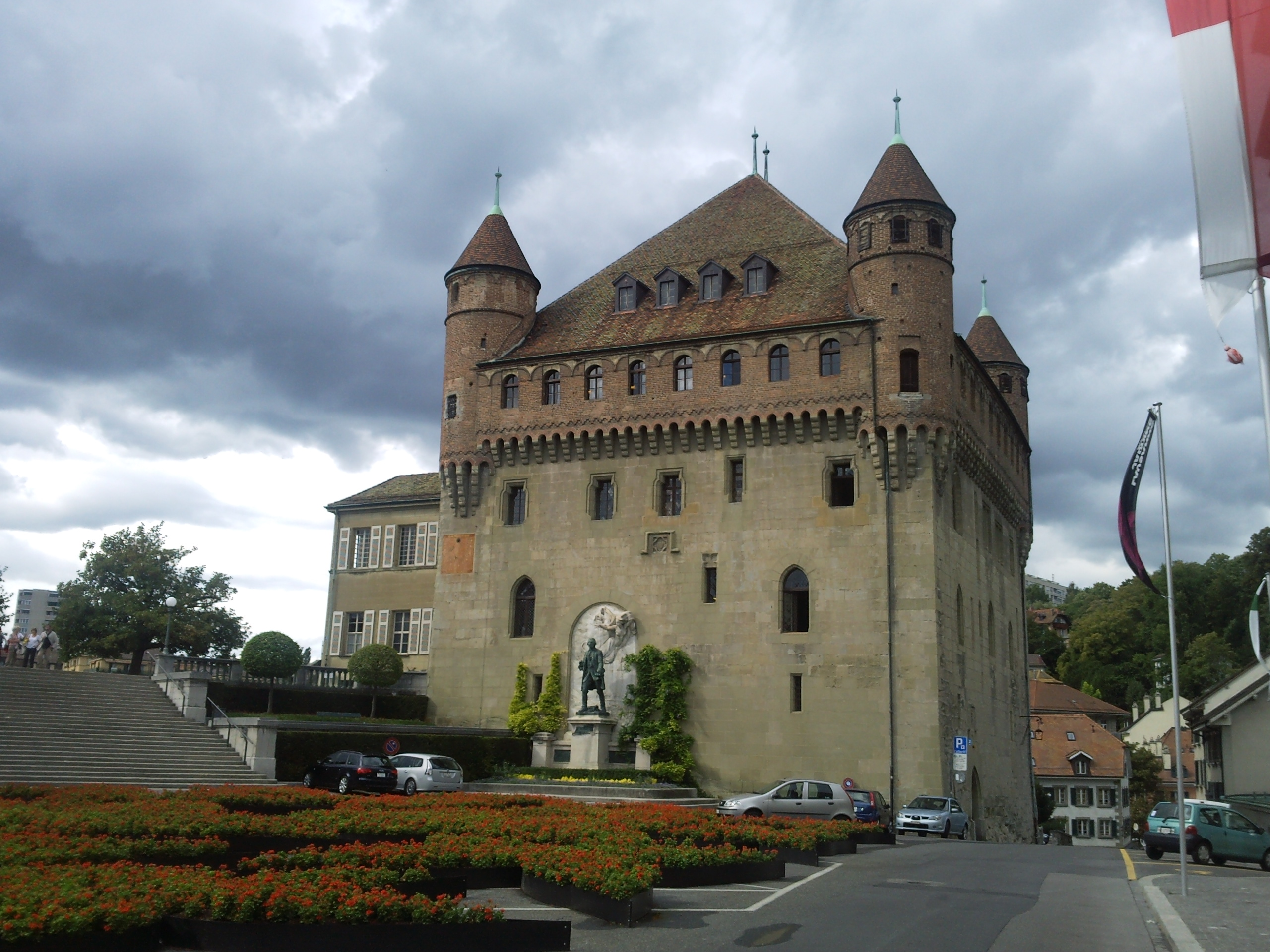
Château Saint-Maire

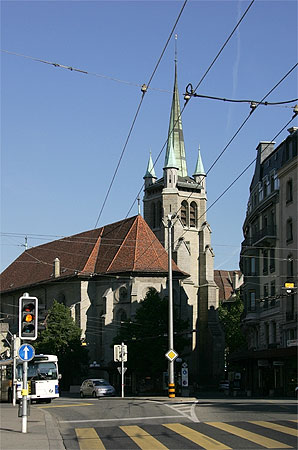
Swiss Reformed Church of Saint-François

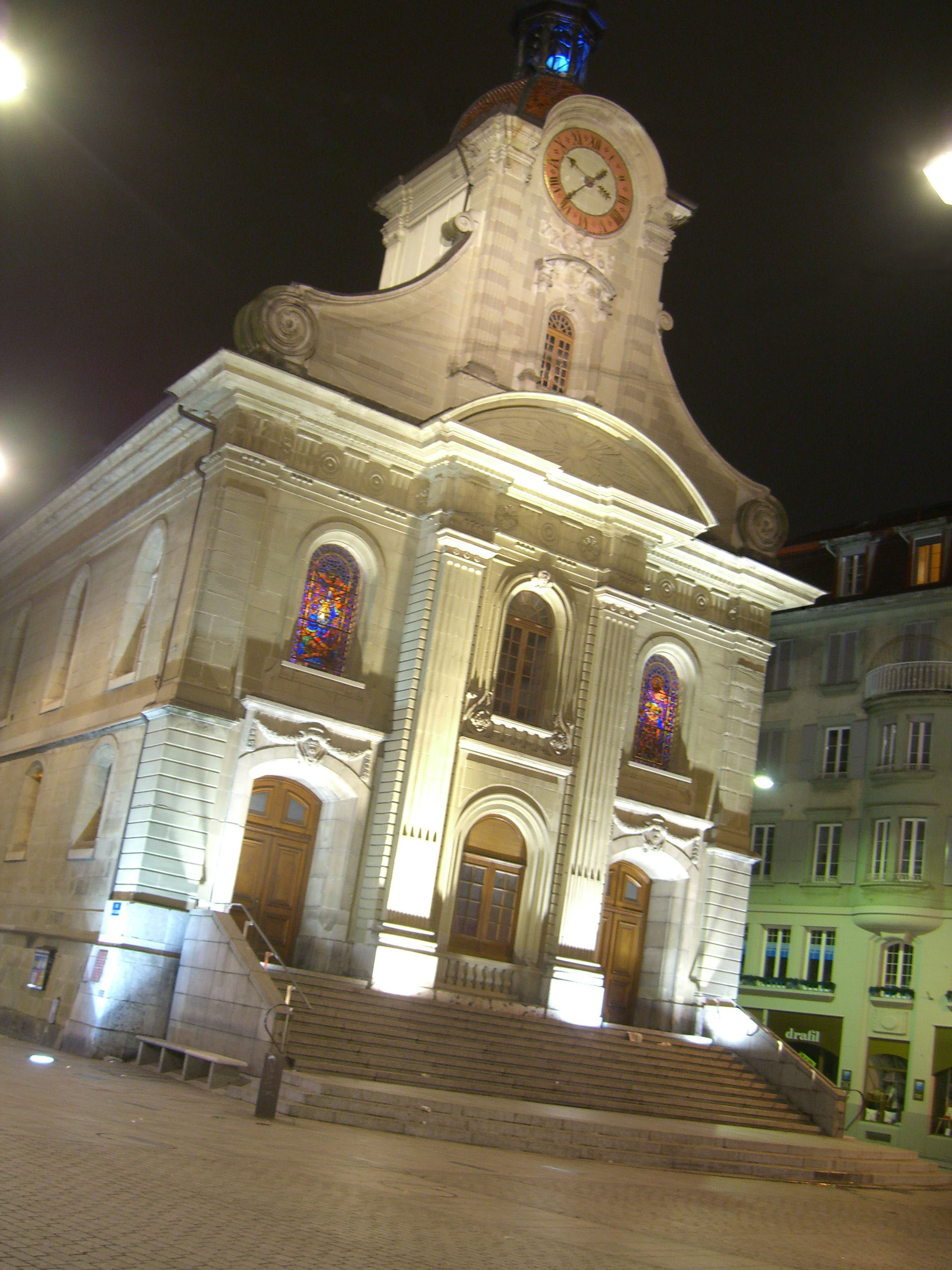
Swiss Reformed Church of Saint-Laurent

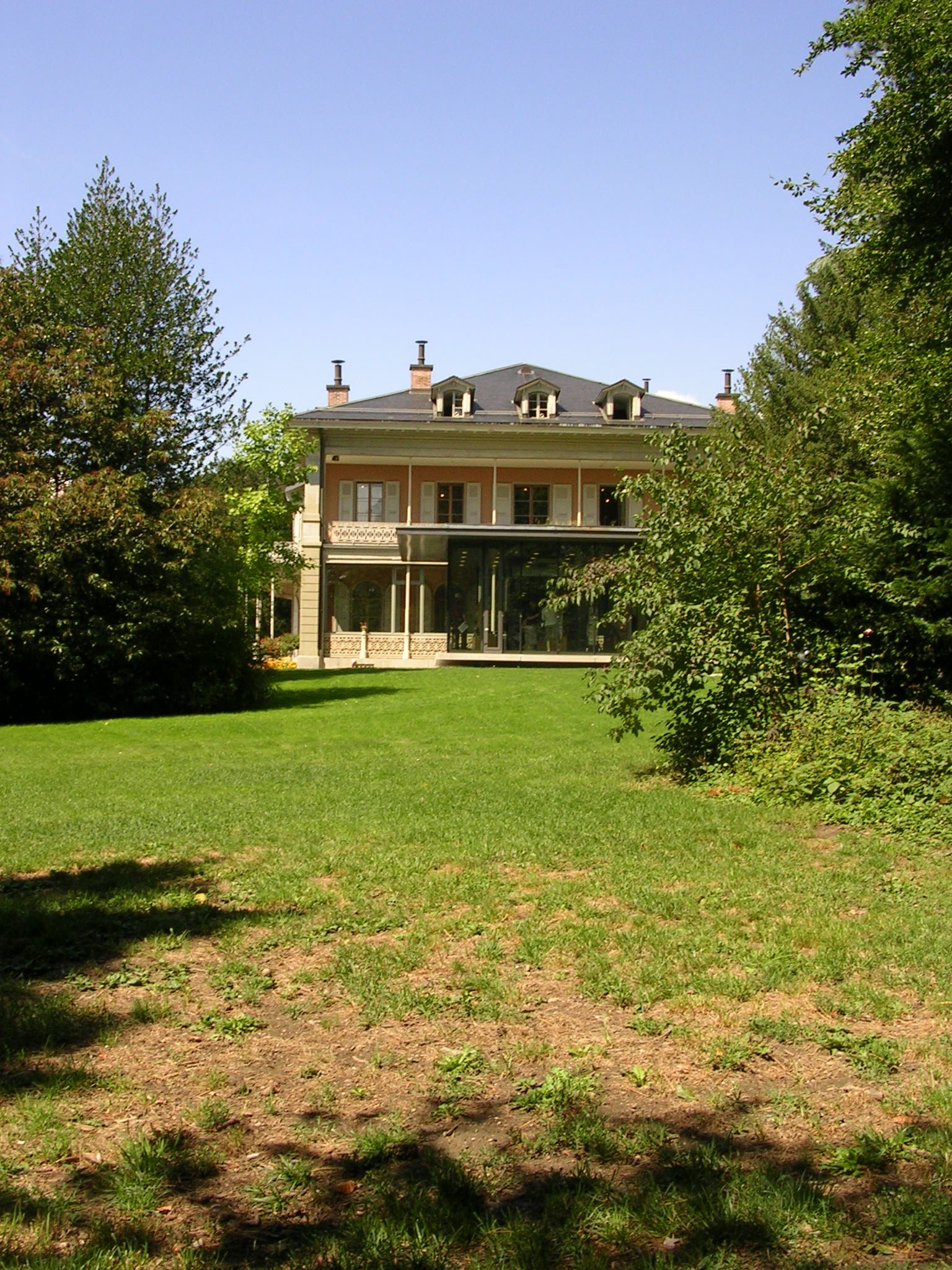
Fondation de l'Hermitage

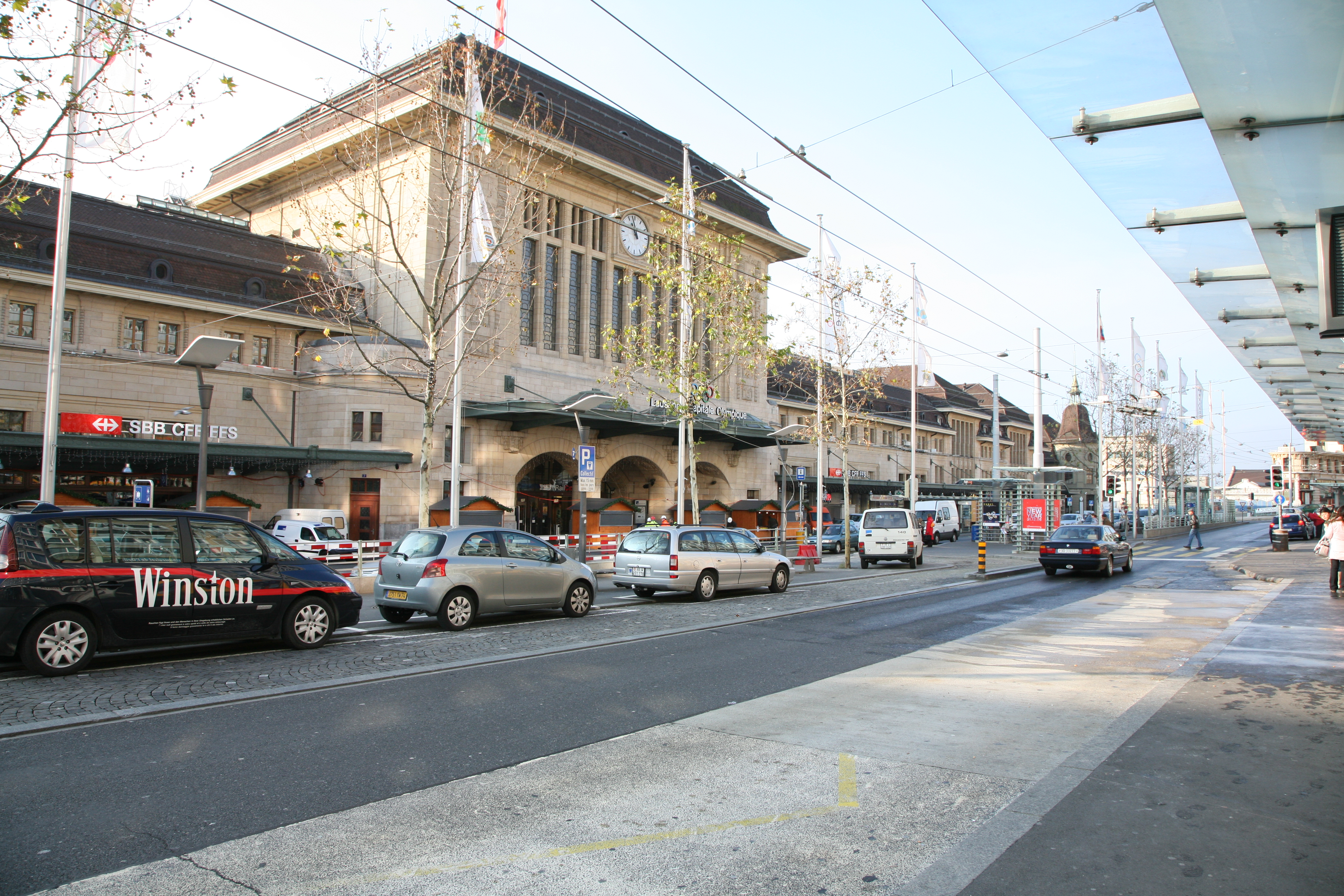
Lausanne railway station

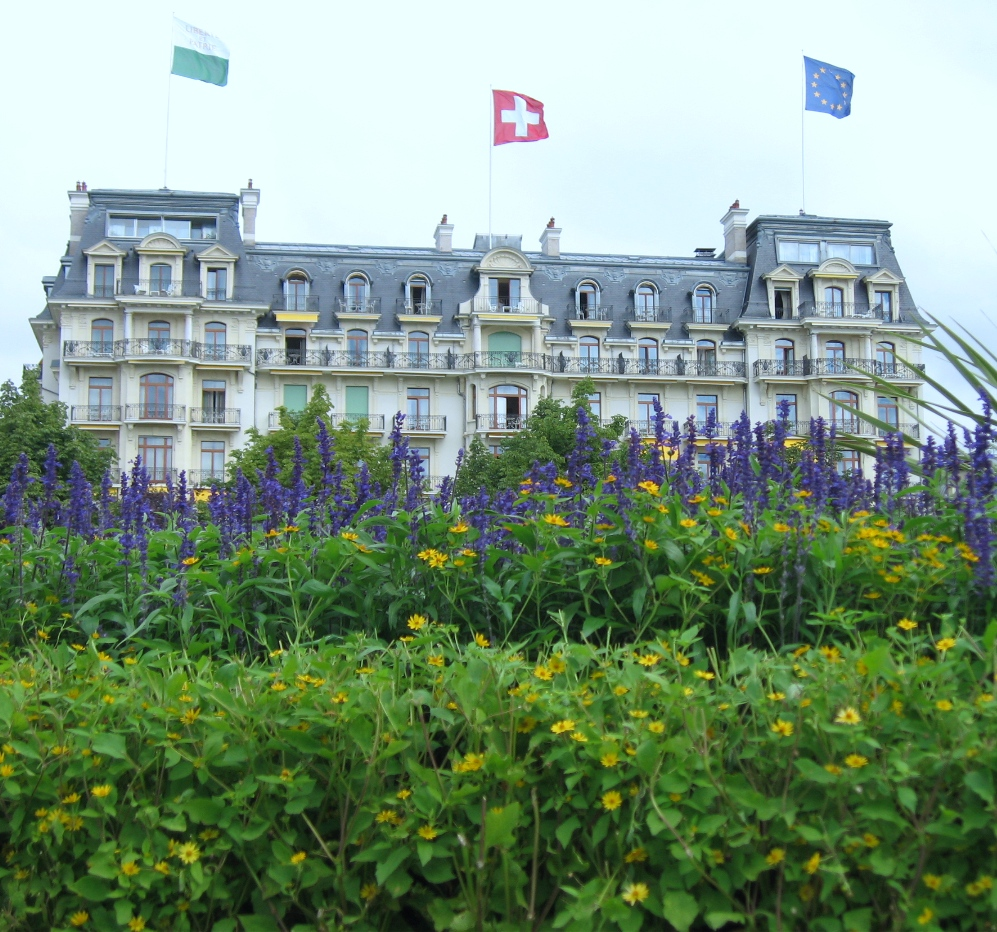
Hôtel Beau-Rivage Palace

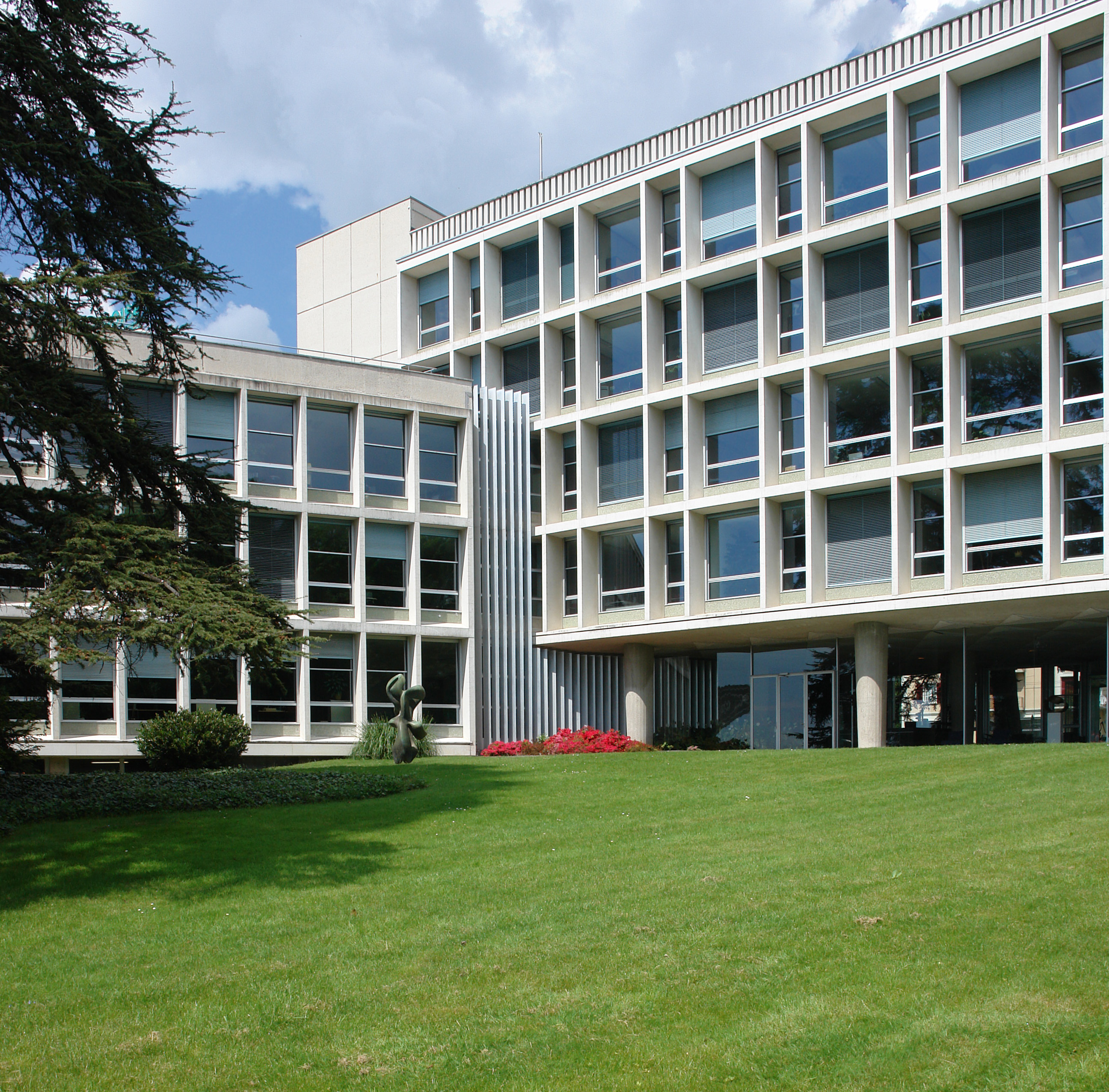
Administrative building of the Vaudoise Assurances

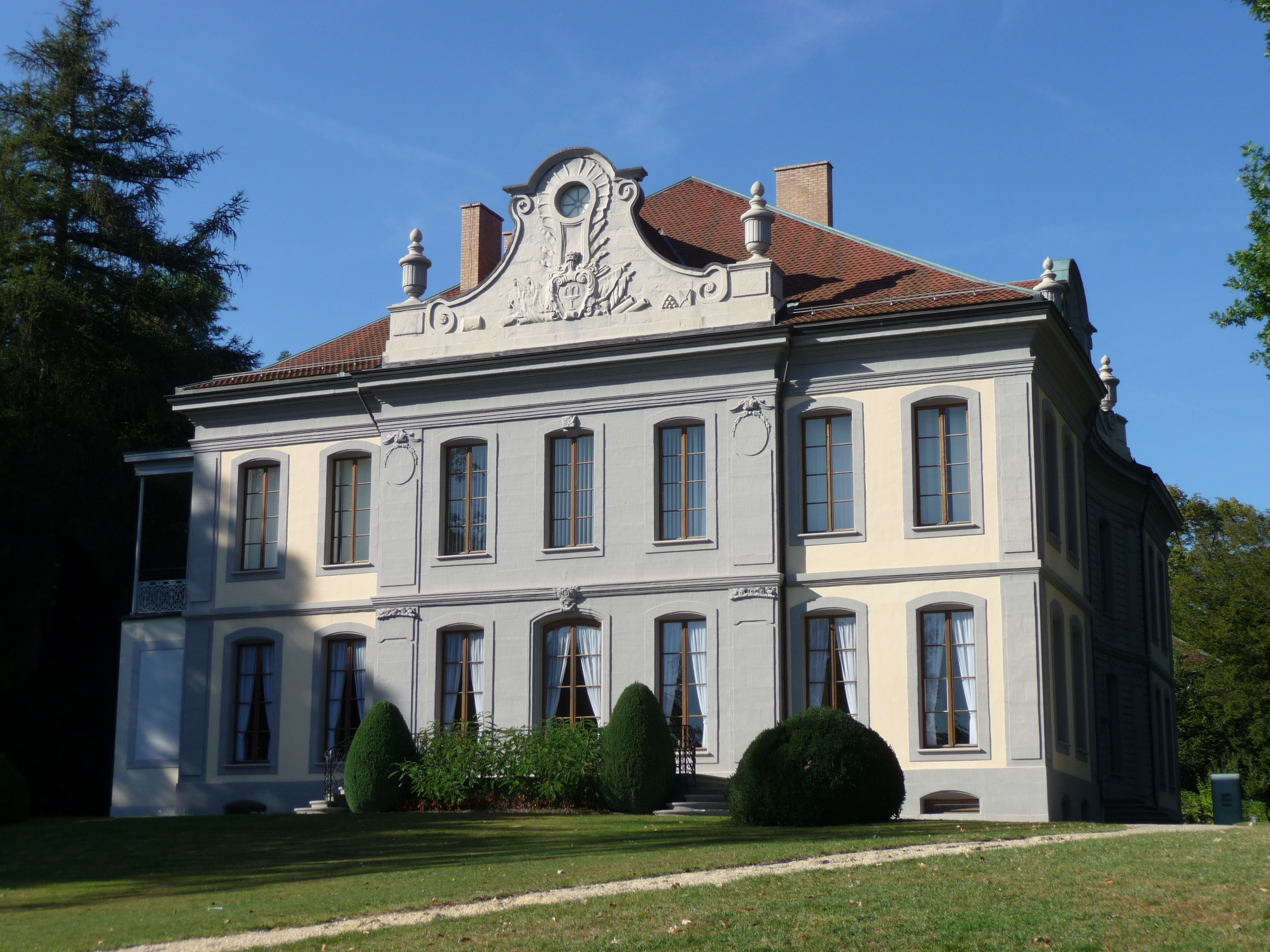
Musée de l'Élysée

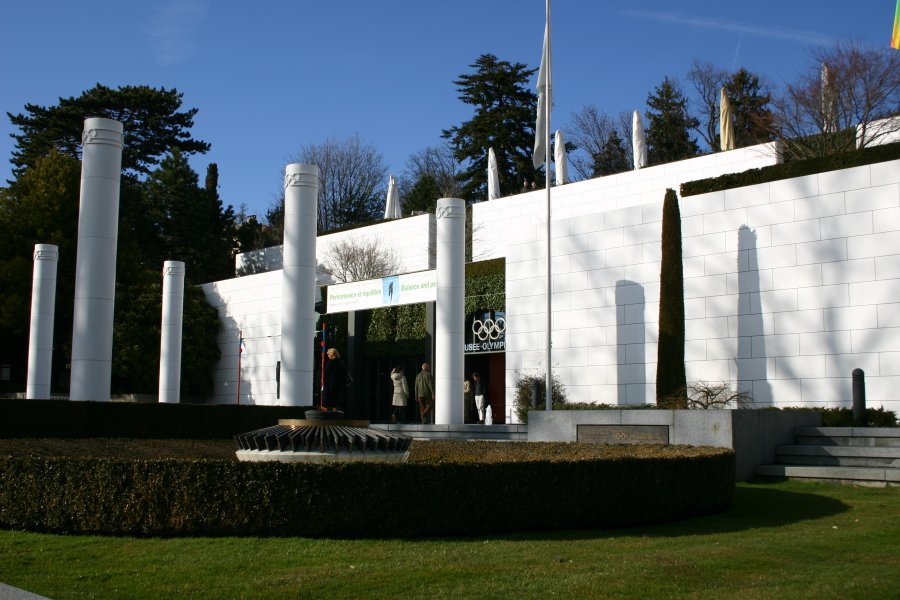
Olympic Museum and Archives of the International Olympic Committee

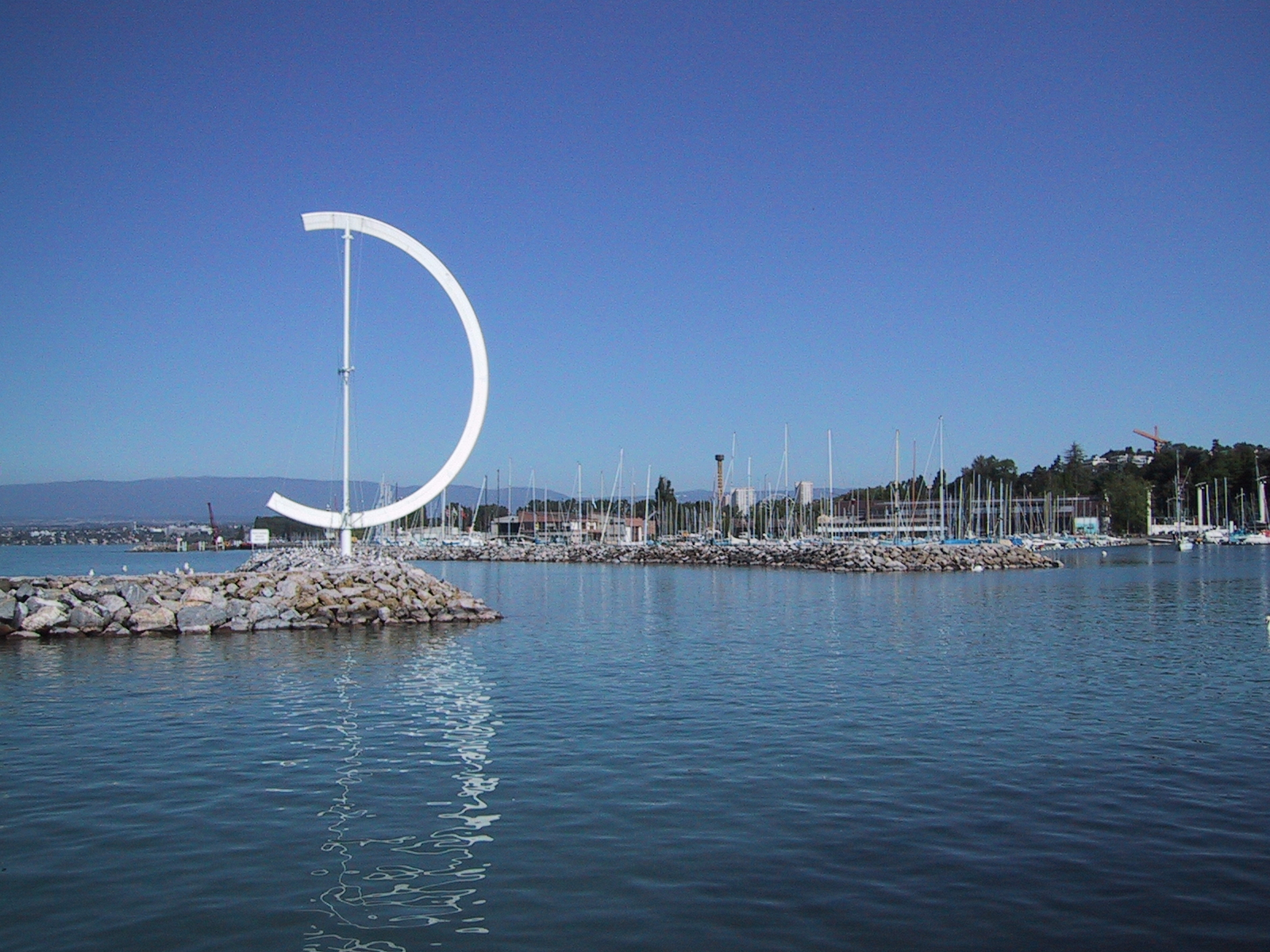
Ouchy waterfront

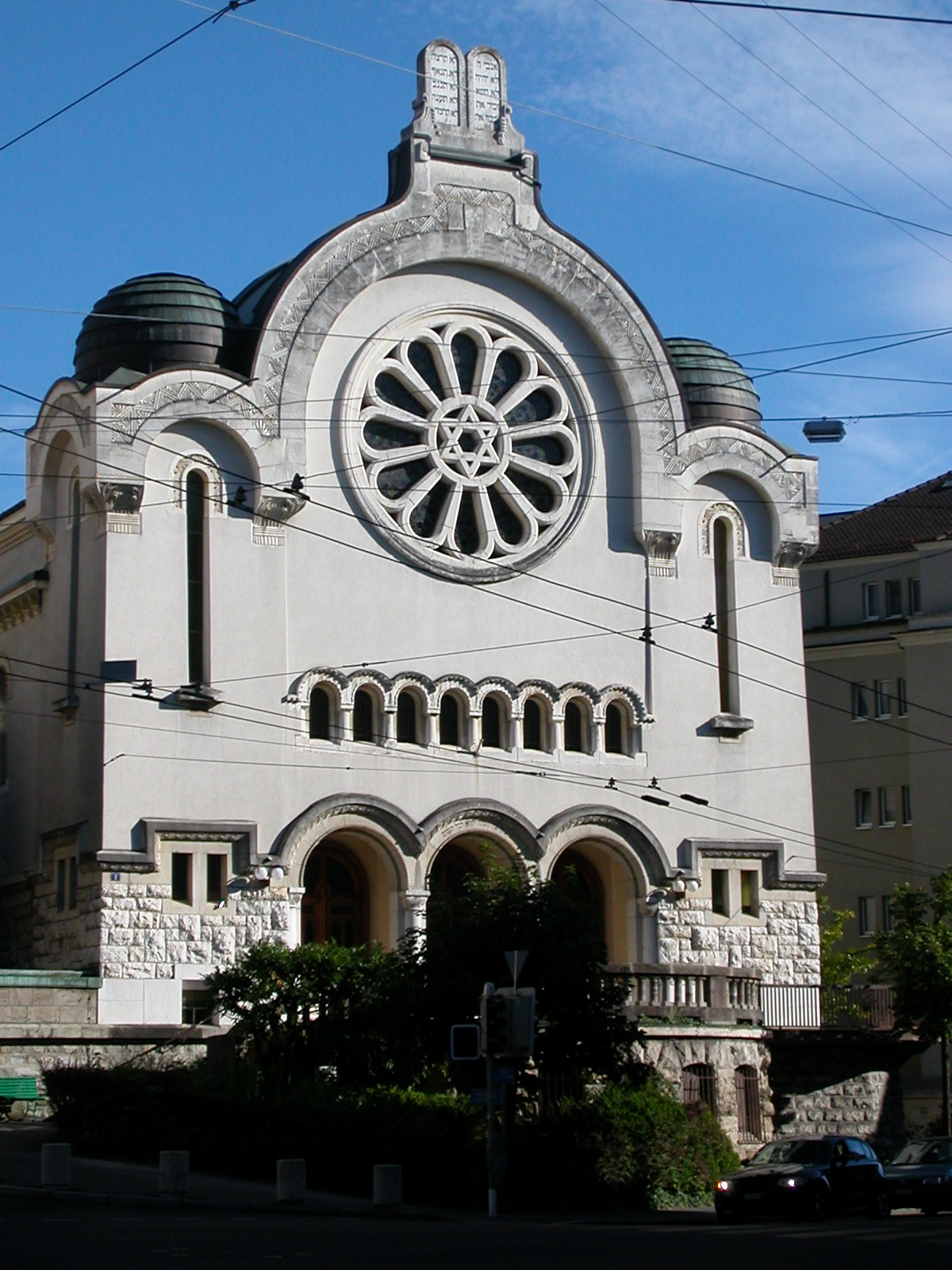
Synagogue

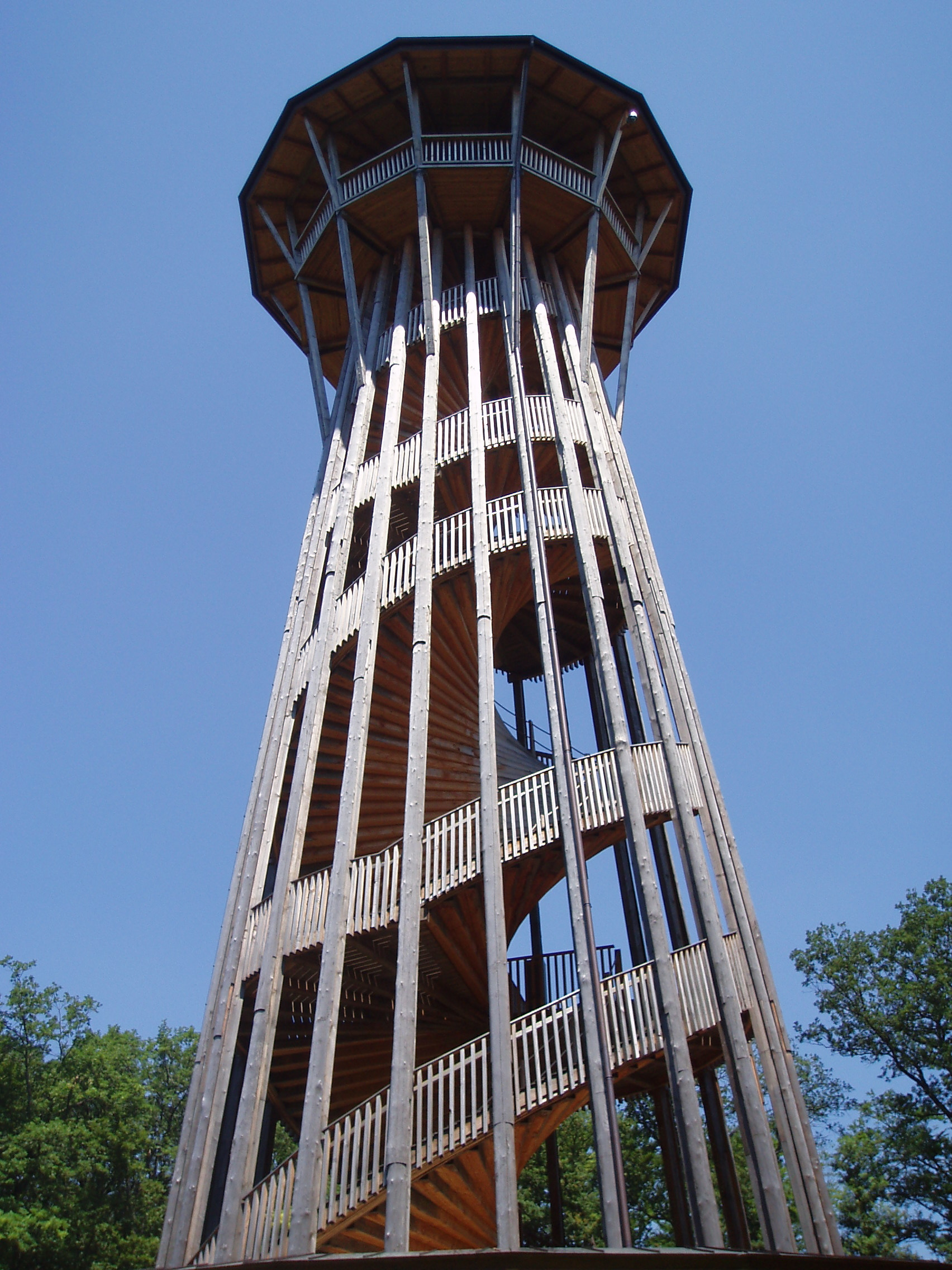
The Sauvabelin Tower

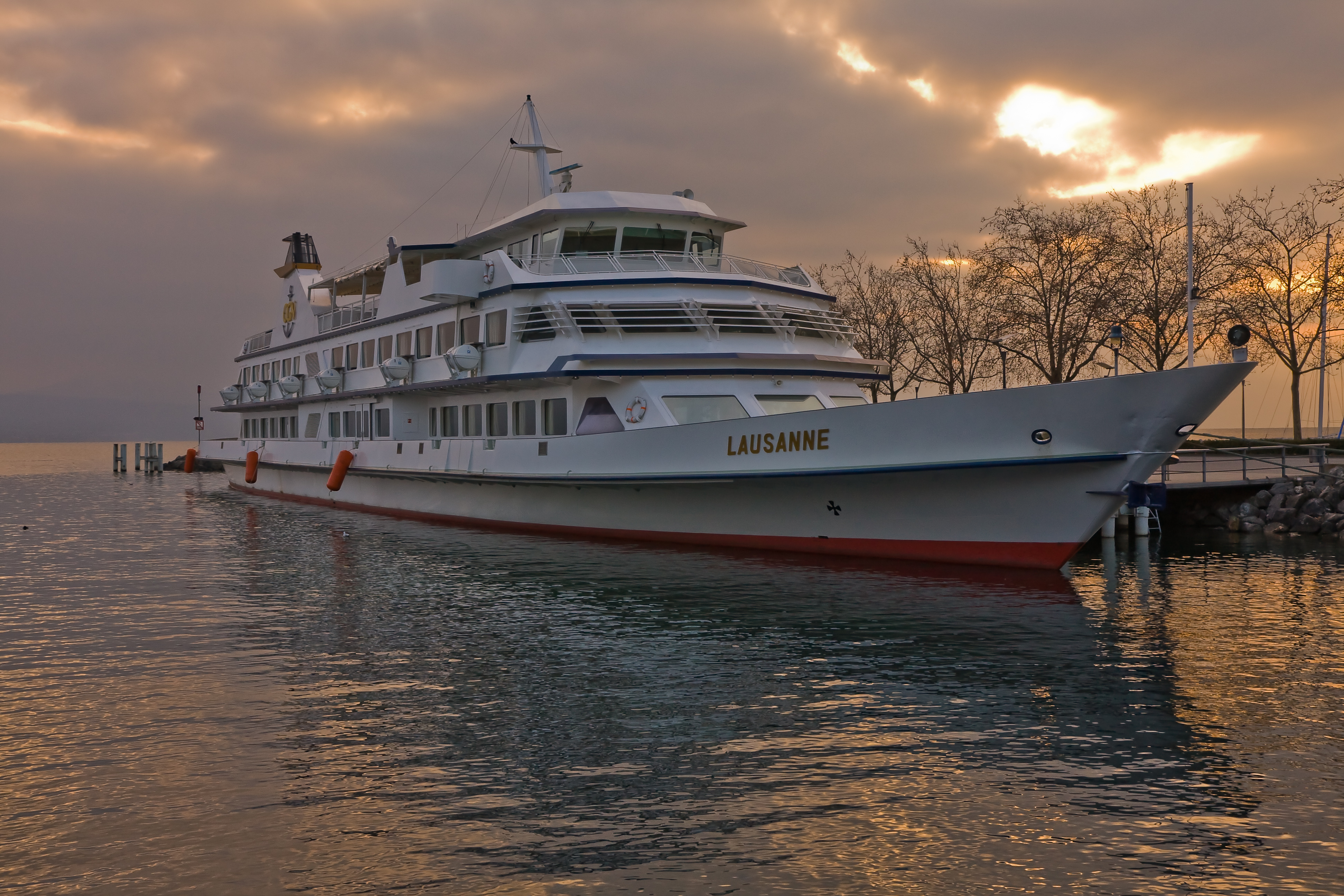
Compagnie Générale de Navigation sur le lac Léman

=== Culture ===
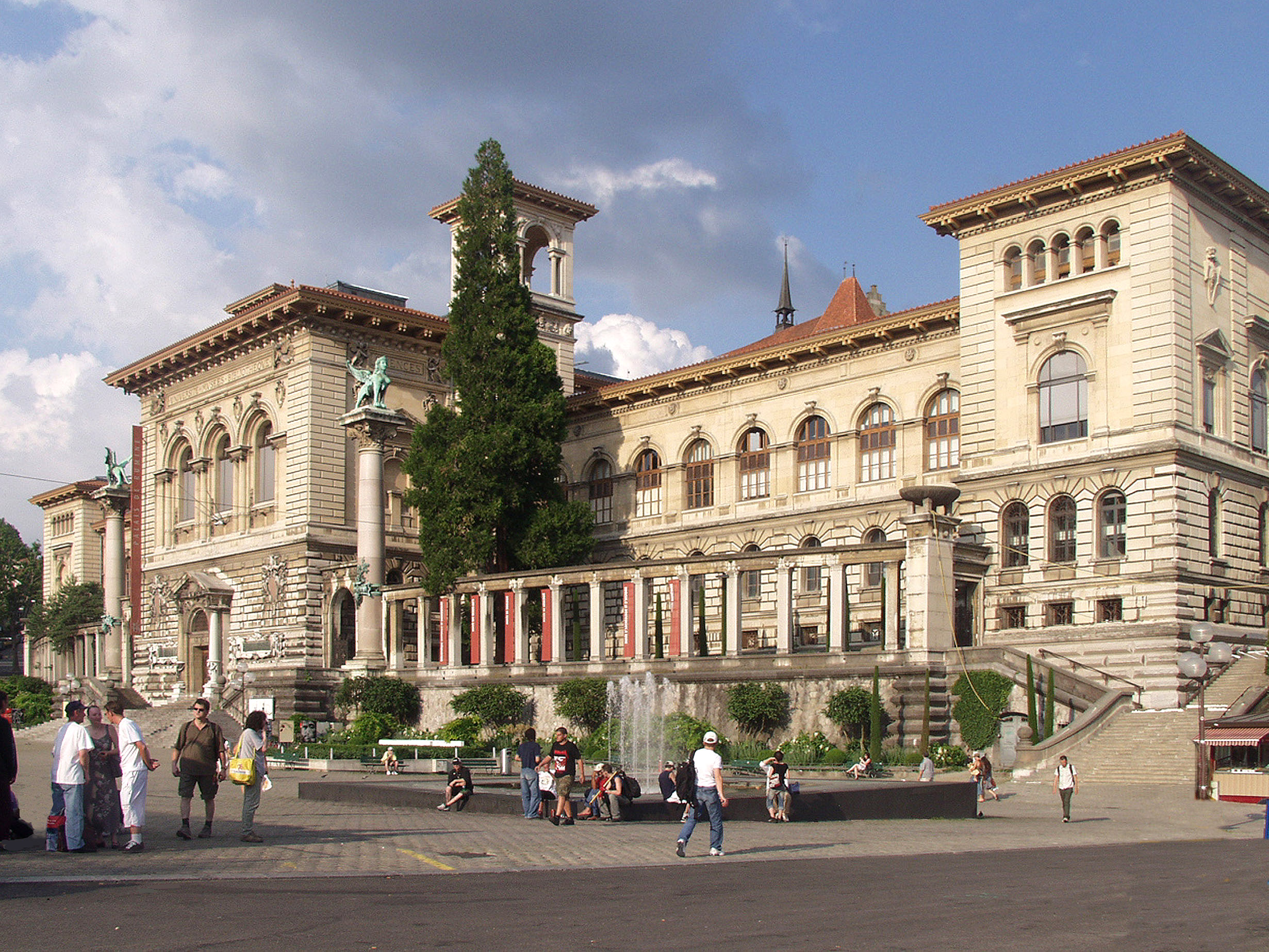
In addition to the Cantonal and University Library of Lausanne, the Palais de Rumine hosts several museums.

The Orchestre de chambre de Lausanne, the Lausanne Opera and the Ensemble vocal de Lausanne provide a diverse music life. The latter has been under the direction of Michel Corboz for many years.

In January, the Prix de Lausanne, a famous dance competition, takes place at the Palais de Beaulieu (the biggest theatre in Switzerland) over a one-week period. The event attracts dancers and some of the big names in dance from all over the world.

The Swiss Film Archive is based in Lausanne and the city hosts film festivals such as the Festival cinémas d’Afrique Lausanne and the Lausanne Underground Film and Music Festival. In addition to modern cinemas, the "Capitole" (in activity since 1929) is the biggest cinema in Switzerland (currently 867 seats).

The city hosted the Eurovision Song Contest 1989. Each July, the Festival de la cité is held in the old town. Other music festivals include the Bach Festival, the Festival et concours Bach de Lausanne, which follows the Nuit des musées (museums' night) in the fall season.

Lausanne is also the home of the Béjart Ballet.

=== Monuments ===
- Cathedral (restored by Viollet-le-Duc)
- Saint-Maire Castle (Château Saint-Maire)
- Town Hall

=== Museums ===
Lausanne is also the site of many museums:

- Archizoom
- Musée Bolo
- Olympic Museum (Musée olympique)
- Musée de l'Élysée
- Fondation de l'Hermitage ("Hermitage Foundation")
- Collection of Outsider Art (Collection de l'art brut)
- Museum of Contemporary Design and Applied Arts (Musée de design et d'arts appliqués contemporains)
- Lausanne Museum of History (Musée historique de Lausanne)
- Musée Arlaud or "Espace Arlaud"
- Espace des inventions ("Science Center for Kids") at the Vallée de la Jeunesse
- Fondation Claude Verdan – Musée de la main ("Museum of the Hand")
- Vivarium de Lausanne
- Cantonal Botanical Museum and Gardens (Musée et jardins botaniques cantonaux)
- Cantonal Museum of Money (Musée monétaire cantonal) (formerly "Cabinet cantonal des médailles")
- Cantonal Museum of Archeology and History (Musée cantonal d'archéologie et d'histoire)
- Cantonal Museum of Fine Arts (Musée cantonal des beaux-arts)
- Cantonal Museum of Zoology (Musée cantonal de zoologie)
- Cantonal Museum of Geology (Musée cantonal de Géologie)
- Lausanne-Vidy Roman Museum

=== Art galleries ===
==== Main contemporary art galleries ====
- Galerie Lucy Mackintosh (closed)
- Dubner Moderne
- Synopsism
- Espace Saint-François

==== Art centers or artist-run galleries ====
- Circuit
- Galerie Galerie 1m3
- Doll espace d'art contemporain

=== Music ===
- Contemporary composer Leonardo Balada's Symphony No. 4 is subtitled Lausanne.
- Igor Stravinsky's L'Histoire du Soldat was premiered in Lausanne in September 1918.

== Sports ==
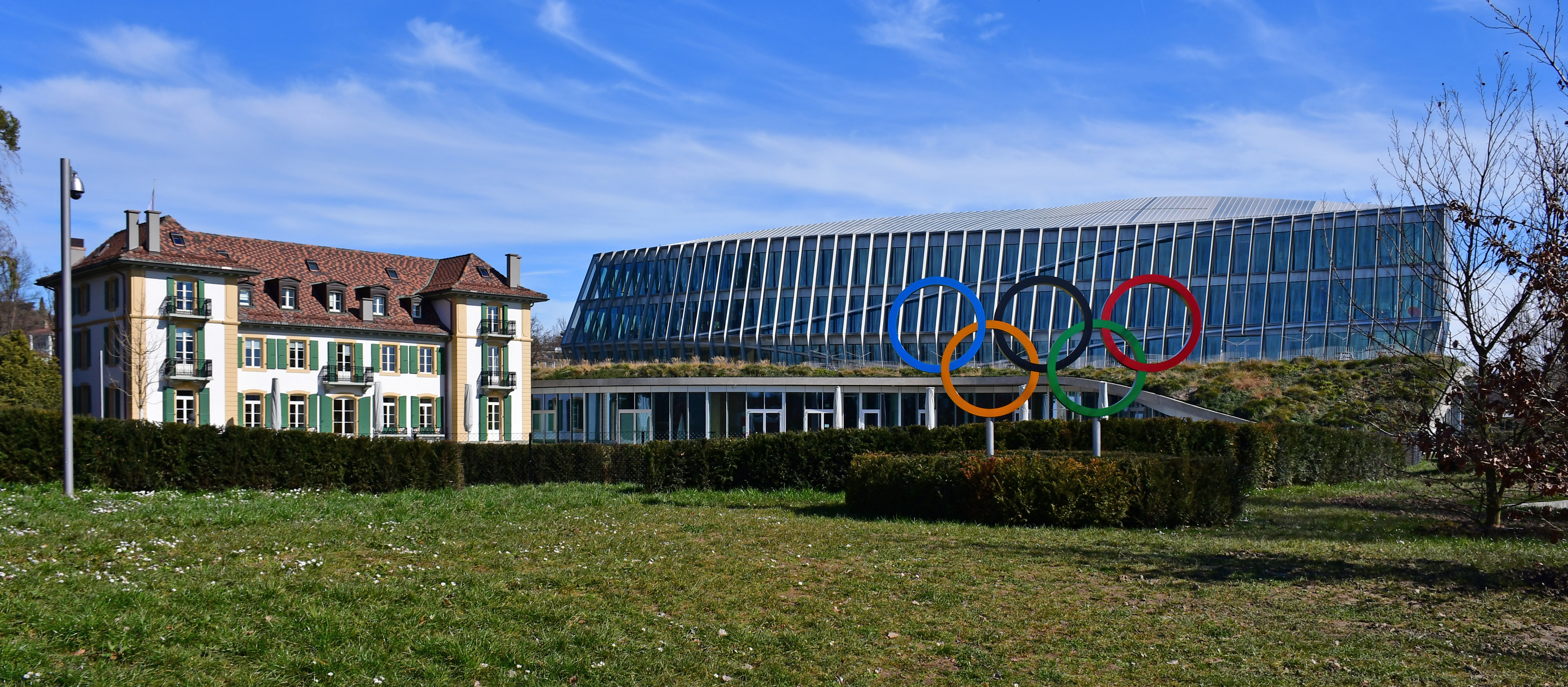
The seat of the International Olympic Committee in Lausanne

Lausanne is home to the International Olympic Committee, with water sports available on the nearby lake and mountaineering in the nearby mountains. Cycling is also a common pastime, with the vineyards in the surrounding hills providing extensive views and challenging routes. There is an annual Track and field meeting (Athletissima), road running through the city (the 20 km (12 mi) of Lausanne), the Tour de Romandie road cycling race, Marathon of Lausanne and triathlon competition, among other sports events. The two most important sports are ice hockey and football. Lausanne hosted the 2020 Winter Youth Olympics and the 2020 IIHF World Championship.

Local

- Lausanne HC Ice Hockey Club
- Lausanne-Sport Football Club
- Stade Lausanne Ouchy Football Club
- Stade Lausanne Rugby Club
- Lausanne-Sports Aviron Rowing Club
- Lausanne University Club American Football (LUCAF)
- Federation of Swiss Bandy
- Lausanne University Club (Luc) Rugby
- Swiss Power Wrestling (SPW) Professional Wrestling promotion and school
- Esperance Sportive Pully Basketball club

International

Lausanne hosts the headquarters of the International Olympic Committee (IOC) and Court of Arbitration for Sport (CAS), and many other international sport associations:

- European Athletics Association (EAA)
- International Baseball Federation (IBAF)
- International Federation of American Football (IFAF)
- International Canoe Federation (ICF)
- International Federation for Equestrian Sports (Fédération Équestre Internationale, FEI)
- International Fencing Federation (Fédération Internationale d'Escrime, FIE)
- International Golf Federation (Fédération Internationale de Golf, IGF)
- International Federation of Gymnastics (Fédération Internationale de Gymnastique, FIG)
- International Hockey Federation (Fédération Internationale de Hockey, FIH)
- International Rowing Federation (Fédération Internationale des Sociétés d'Aviron, FISA)
- International Skating Union (ISU)
- International Swimming Federation (Fédération Internationale de Natation, FINA)
- International Table Tennis Federation (ITTF)
- International Triathlon Union (ITU)
- International University Sports Federation (Fédération Internationale du Sport Universitaire, FISU)
- International Volleyball Federation (Fédération Internationale de Volleyball, FIVB)
- International Wushu Federation (IWUF)
- World Air Sports Federation (Fédération Aéronautique Internationale, FAI)
- World Archery Federation (WA; Fédération Internationale de Tir à l'Arc, FITA)
- World Boxing
- World DanceSport Federation (Fédération mondiale de danse sportive, WDSF)
- World Taekwondo
- FIDE (International Chess Federation)

== International relations ==
In March–April 2015, the negotiations on Iran nuclear deal framework for a comprehensive agreement on the Iranian nuclear programme took place at the Beau-Rivage Palace, where the foreign ministers and delegations from the United States, the United Kingdom, Russia, China, France, the European Union, Germany (P5+1) and Iran were also hosted. The final press conference, on 2 April 2015, was held at the EPFL Learning Centre.

On 24 July 1923, the Treaty of Lausanne was signed at the Beau-Rivage Palace.

== Notable people ==
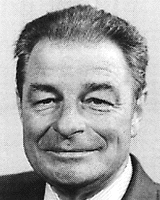
Jean-Pascal Delamuraz

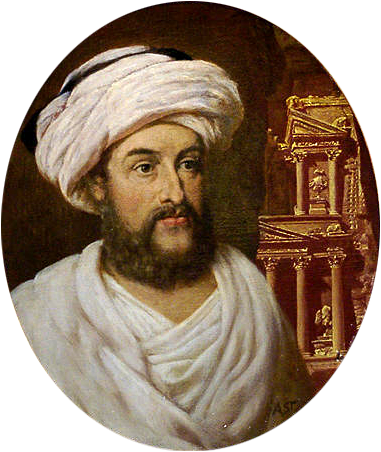
Johann Ludwig Burckhardt

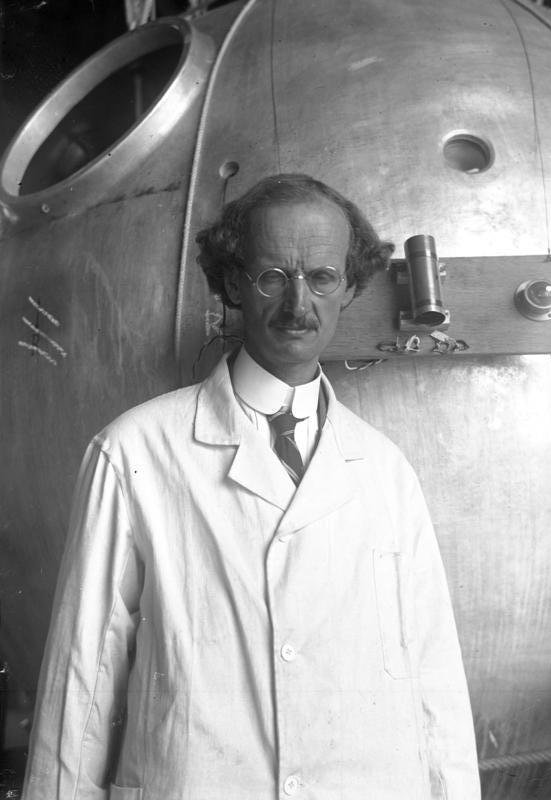
Auguste Piccard, 1932

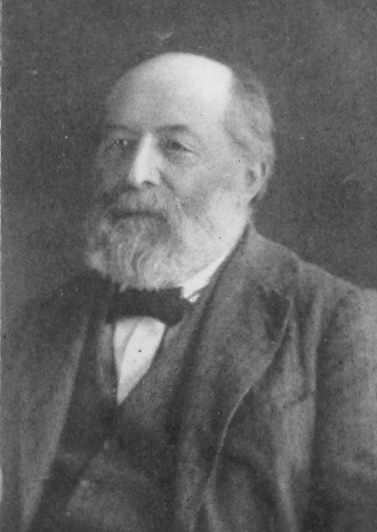
Albert Chavannes, 1903

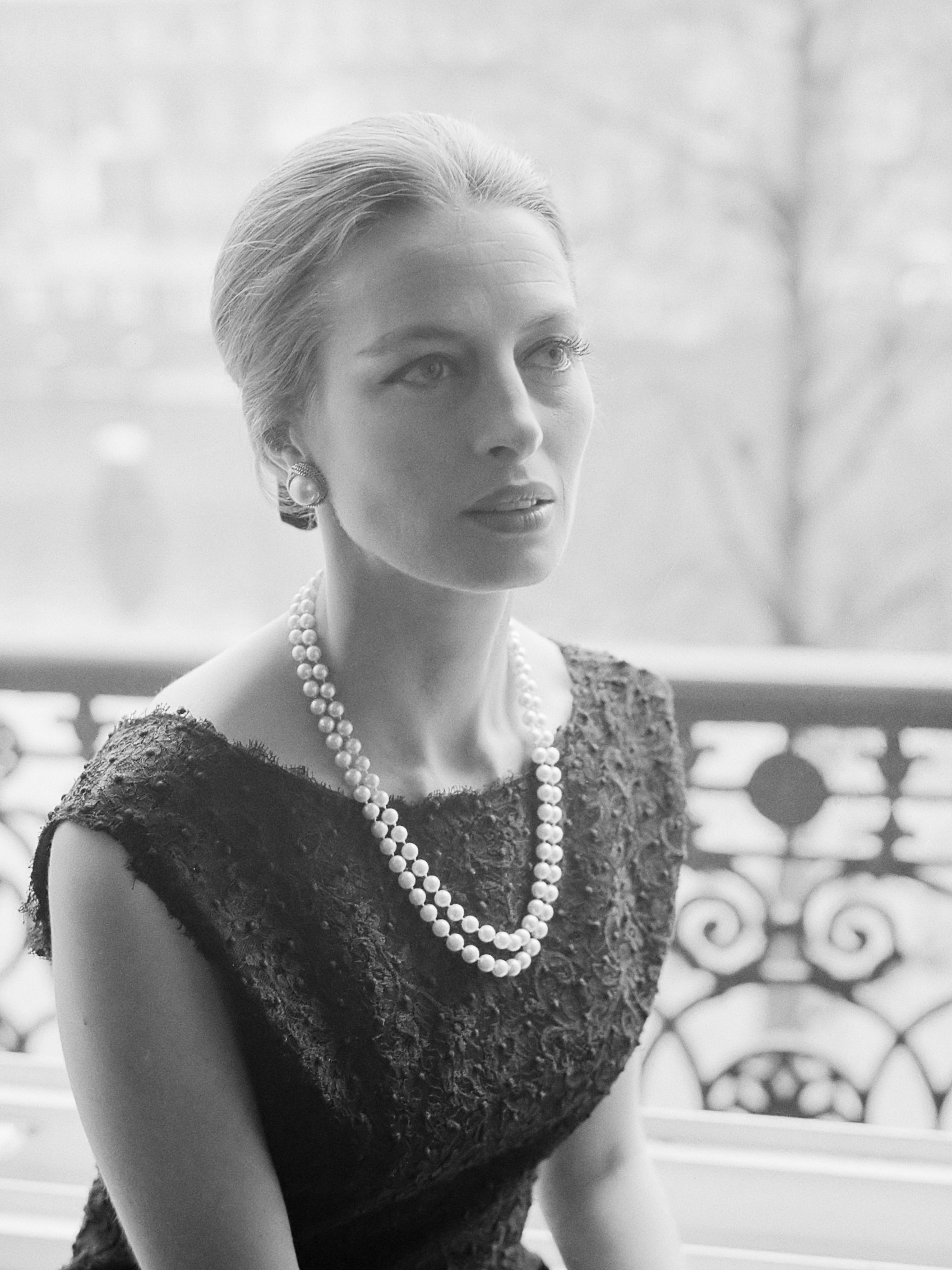
Capucine, 1962

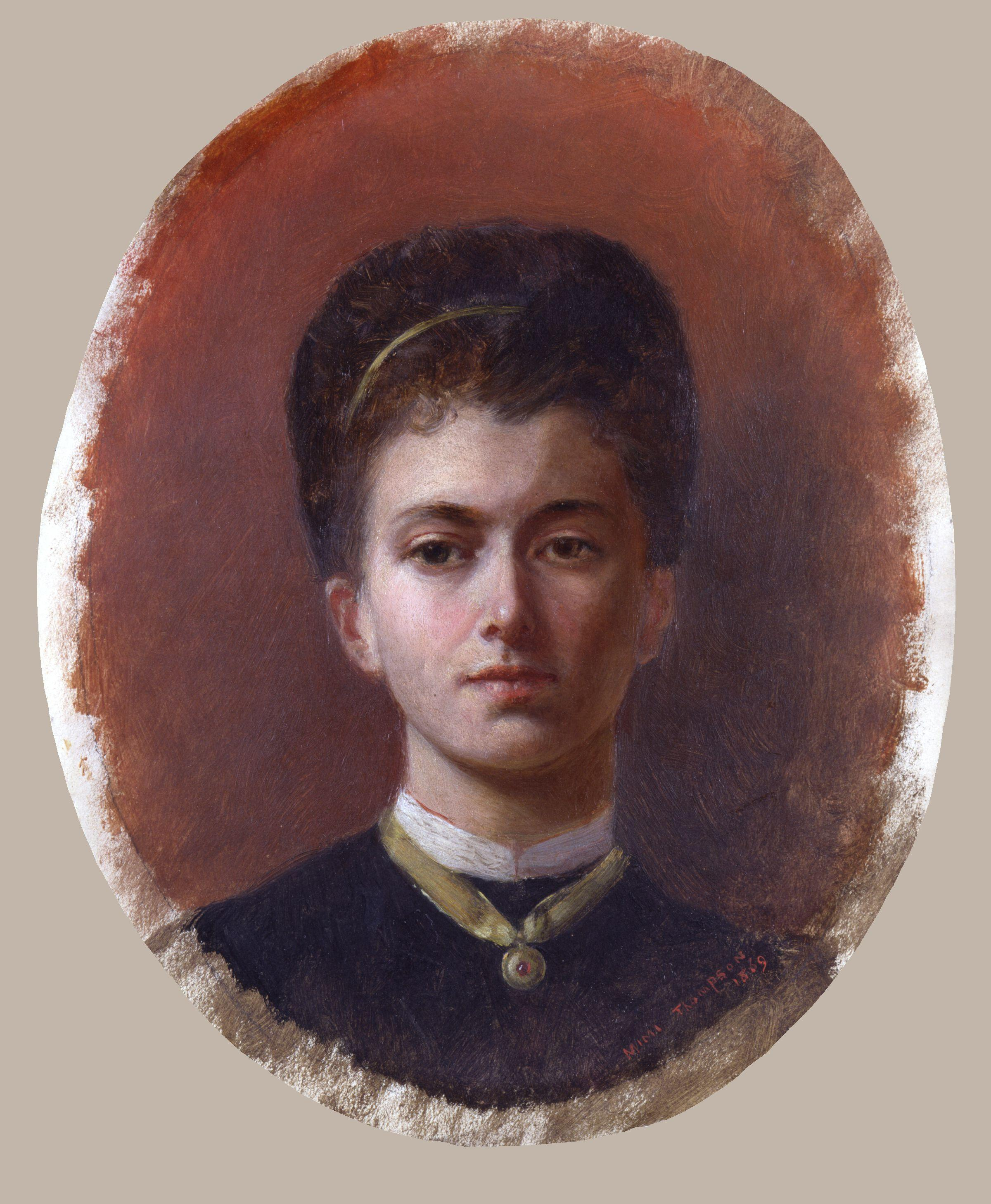
Lady Elizabeth Butler (née Thompson)

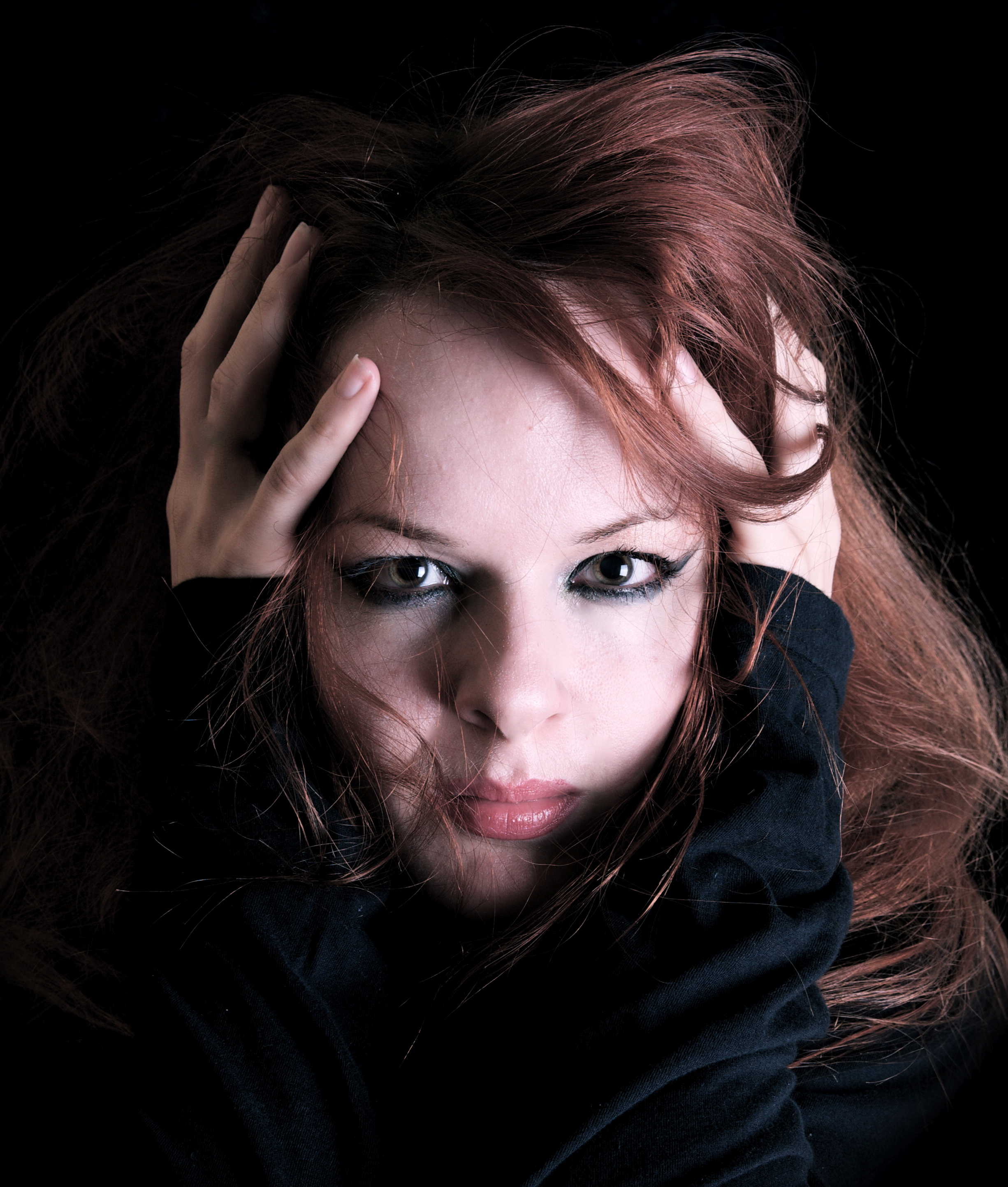
Rachel Kolly d'Alba, 2009

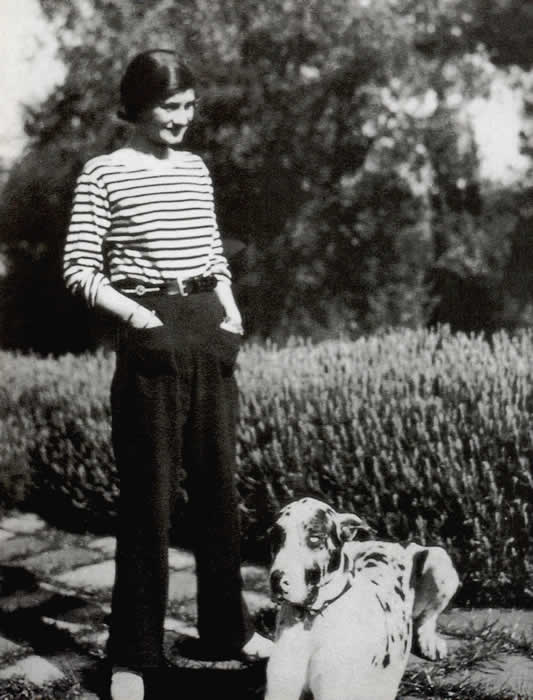
Coco Chanel, 1928

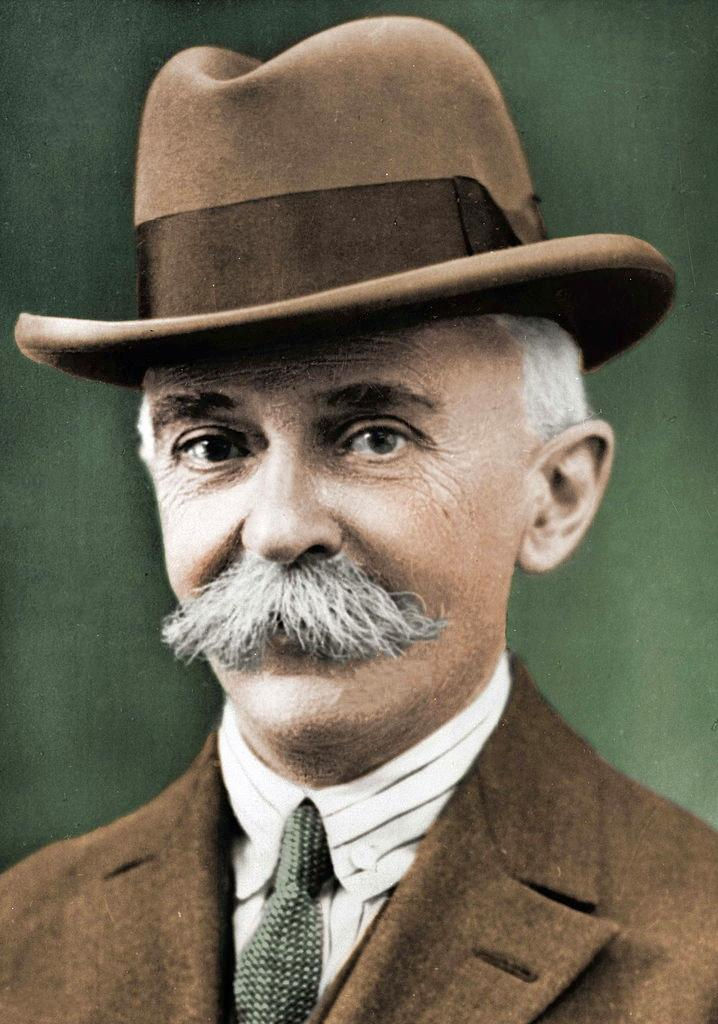
Pierre de Coubertin, 1925

=== Public service, the military and the church ===
- Pierre Viret (1511–1571), Reformed theologian and Protestant reformer
- David-Louis Constant de Rebecque (1722–1785), colonel and commandant of a Swiss regiment
- Alexandre Vinet (1797–1847), critic and theologian
- Amalric-Frédéric Buscarlet (1836–1928), overseas minister of the Church of Scotland, promoted the building of the Scots Kirk, Lausanne in 1876
- Major General Lionel Dunsterville CB CSI (1865–1946), British general, who led Dunsterforce
- Baron Carl Gustaf Emil Mannerheim (1867–1951), Finnish field marshal and president
- Gustave Biéler DSO MBE (1904–1944), Special Operations Executive agent during World War II
- Metropolitan Anthony of Sourozh (1914–2003), Russian Orthodox ecclesiastic
- Georges-André Chevallaz (1915–2002), historian, politician, Mayor of Lausanne 1958–1973 and member of the Swiss Federal Council 1974–1983
- Jean-François Bergier (1931–2009), historian, chaired the Bergier commission
- Jean-Pascal Delamuraz (1936–1998), politician
- Daniel Brélaz (born 1950), mathematician and politician, Mayor of Lausanne 2001–2016
- Simone de Montmollin (born 1968), member of the National Council
- Cassandre Berdoz, first woman Watchman of Lausanne Cathedral
- Marguerite Narbel (1918–2010), member of the Grand Council of Vaud

=== Science and architecture ===
- Jean-Nicolas-Sébastien Allamand (1716–1787), natural philosopher
- Johann Ludwig Burckhardt (1784–1817), traveller, geographer and orientalist
- Oswald Heer (1809–1883), geologist and naturalist
- Eugène Viollet-le-Duc (1814–1879), French architect and author
- Eugène Renevier (1831–1906), geologist and professor at the University of Lausanne
- Léon Walras (1834–1910), economist, professor of economics at University of Lausanne, co-founder of the Lausanne School of economics, together with Vilfredo Pareto
- Vilfredo Pareto (1848–1923), economist, engineer, sociologist, philosopher, professor of economics at University of Lausanne, co-founder of the Lausanne School of economics, together with: Léon Walras
- Sir Waldemar Haffkine (1860–1930), Ukrainian bacteriologist
- Auguste Piccard (1884–1962), physicist, inventor and explorer
- Michel Mayor (born 1942), astrophysicist, winner of the 2015 Kyoto Prize and co-laureate of the 2019 Nobel Prize in Physics
- Bernard Tschumi (born 1944), architect, writer and educator associated with deconstructivism
- Martin Odersky (born 1958), inventor and maintainer of the Scala programming language, professor of programming methods at EPFL

=== Writing ===
- Jean Bagnyon (1412–1487), lawyer, historian, political writer and translator
- Jean-Pierre de Crousaz (1663–1750), writer, theologian and philosopher
- Edward Gibbon (1737–1794), English historian, writer and Member of Parliament
- Benjamin Constant (1767–1830), political activist and writer on politics and religion.
- Charles Secrétan (1815–1895), philosopher
- Albert Chavannes (1836–1903), American author, philosopher and sociologist
- Charles-Ferdinand Ramuz (1878–1947), French-speaking Swiss writer
- Verena Hoehne (1945–2012), journalist and author
- Georges Simenon (1903–1989), Belgian writer, created Jules Maigret
- Alejo Carpentier (1904–1980), Cuban novelist, essayist, and musicologist
- Jean Anouilh (1910–1987), French dramatist
- Jack Rollan (1916–2007), journalist
- Han Suyin (1917–2012), Chinese-born Eurasian physician and author of books on China
- Nanos Valaoritis (1921–2019), Greek writer, poet, novelist and playwright
- Jeanlouis Cornuz (1922–2007), novel writer
- Albin Schram (1926–2005), collected letters by royals, scientists, writers and philosophers
- Jon Steele (born 1950), American expatriate author, cameraman and journalist
- Manon Schick (born 1974), Swiss-German journalist and human rights activist

=== Acting ===
- George Sanders (1906–1972), British film and television actor and author
- James Mason (1909–1984), English actor
- Freddy Buache (1924–2019), cinema critic and director of the Swiss Film Archive 1951–1996
- Capucine (1928–1990), French actress and model
- Fernand Melgar (born 1961), actor, producer, director and film editor
- Vincent Perez (born 1964), film actor and director
- David Bennent (born 1966), actor
- Élodie Frenck (born 1974), Peruvian-Swiss-French actress
- James Thiérrée (born 1974), circus performer, violinist, actor and director

=== Painting ===
- Charles Henry-Pache (1749-1820), Swiss manufacturer, importer and supplier to The Royal Society. A member of the Patrician Pache Family of Morges.
- Jeanne-Charlotte Allamand (1760–1839), pioneer, educator and artist
- François Bocion (1828–1890), artist and teacher, painted scenes around Lake Geneva
- Eugène Grasset (1845–1917), decorative artist, pioneer in Art Nouveau design
- Elizabeth Thompson (Lady Butler) (1846–1933), British painter of history paintings
- Théophile Steinlen (1859–1923), French Art Nouveau painter and printmaker
- Marius Borgeaud (1861–1924), Post-Impressionist painter
- Félix Vallotton (1865–1925), Swiss/French painter and printmaker associated with Les Nabis
- Alice Bailly (1872–1938), radical painter, participated in the Dada movement
- René Auberjonois (1872–1957), post-impressionist painter
- Ernest Boiceau (1881–1950), artist and designer
- Aloise Corbaz (1886–1964), outsider artist
- Lucienne Peiry (born 1961), PhD in the history of art, specialist in Outsider Art ("Art Brut"), an exhibition curator and lecturer
- Andy Picci (born 1989), conceptual artist
- Irene Pijoan (1953–2004), painter, sculptor, educator
- James Nix (born 1963), painter
- Georges Dumitresco (1922–2008), Romanian-Swiss physician, painter, illustrator and poet

=== Music and dancing ===
- Karol Szymanowski (1882–1937), Polish composer and pianist
- Hélène Boschi (1917–1990), pianist
- Maurice Béjart (1927–2007), dancer, choreographer and opera director, ran the Béjart Ballet
- Charles Dutoit (born 1936), conductor
- Manola Asensio (born 1943), ballet dancer
- Jacques Viret (born 1943), French musicologist
- Pierre Amoyal (born 1949), French violinist, artistic director of the Conservatory of Lausanne
- Rachel Kolly d'Alba (born 1981), violinist and an honorary citizen of Asunción in Paraguay

=== Royalty, nobility, and the landed gentry ===
- Victoria Eugenia of Battenberg (1887–1969), Queen of Spain as the wife of King Alfonso XIII
- Alexandra Tegleva (1894–1955), Russian noblewoman who served as a nursemaid in the Imperial Household, lived in Lausanne after the Russian Revolution
- Helen of Greece and Denmark (1896–1982), Queen mother of Romania, saved Romanian Jews in World War II
- Prince Nicholas Tchkotoua (1909–1984), Georgian writer and member of the Order of Malta
- Bhumibol Adulyadej (1927–2016), late King of Thailand, educated and lived locally 1933–1945
- Infante Carlos, Duke of Calabria (1938–2015), last infante of Spain
- Prince Egon von Fürstenberg (1946–2004), socialite, banker, fashion and interior designer
- Princess Yasmin Aga Khan (born 1949), American philanthropist
- Princess Margareta of Romania (born 1949), daughter of King Michael I and Queen Anne of Romania
- Princess Elena of Romania (born 1950), daughter of King Michael I and Queen Anne of Romania
- Princess Ubol Ratana (born 1951), Thai princess
- Prince Christoph of Hohenlohe-Langenburg (1956–2006), European socialite

=== Business ===
- Peter Carl Fabergé (1846–1920), Russian jeweller of Fabergé eggs, founded House of Fabergé
- Coco Chanel (1883–1971), French fashion designer and businesswoman
- Ingvar Kamprad (1926–2018), founded IKEA
- Paloma Picasso (born 1949), French and Spanish fashion designer and businesswoman
- Dominique Lévy (born 1967), art dealer

=== Sport ===
- Pierre de Coubertin (1863–1937), French baron, founder of the International Olympic Committee
- André Wicky (1928–2016), racing car driver and team owner
- Umberto Agnelli (1934–2004), head of Fiat and Juventus FC
- Howard Stupp (born 1955), Canadian wrestler
- Bertrand Piccard FRSGS (born 1958), psychiatrist and balloonist
- Patrik Lörtscher (born 1960), curler, Olympic winner
- Stéphane Chapuisat (born 1969), footballer
- Mattia Binotto (born 1969), Italian F1 engineer, team principal of Scuderia Ferrari from 2019 to 2022
- Sébastien Loeb (born 1974), French rally, racing, and rallycross driver
- Ludovic Magnin (born 1979), footballer
- Lorik Cana (born 1983), Albanian footballer
- Stan Wawrinka (born 1985), tennis player
- Stéphane Lambiel (born 1985), figure skater and coach and Olympic silver medalist
- Timea Bacsinszky (born 1989), tennis player
- Hugo de Sadeleer (born 1997), racing driver
- Dario Cabanelas (born 2006), racing driver

=== Unwelcome notables ===
- Marie Manning (1821–1849), Swiss domestic servant and, with her husband, a murderer
- Serge Voronoff (1866–1951), French quack surgeon of Russian extraction
- Gaston-Armand Amaudruz (1920–2018), neo-fascist political philosopher and Holocaust denier
- François Genoud (1915–1996), financier and Nazi sympathizer

== See also ==
- Franco-Provençal language
- Eurovision Song Contest 1989
- International Academy of Sport Science and Technology (AISTS)
- Lac de Sauvabelin, Tour de Sauvabelin
- Beau-Rivage Palace
- Scots Kirk, Lausanne (Church of Scotland)
- List of mayors of Lausanne
- Lausanne Conference of 1949
- Treaty of Lausanne (1564)
- Treaty of Lausanne (1912)
- Treaty of Lausanne (1923)

== Bibliography ==
Published in the 19th century

- Switzerland. Coblenz: Karl Baedeker. 1863.

Published in the 20th century

- Coolidge, William Augustus Brevoort (1911). "Lausanne" . In Chisholm, Hugh (ed.). Encyclopædia Britannica. Vol. 16 (11th ed.). Cambridge University Press. pp. 288–289.
- "Lausanne", Switzerland, Together with Chamonix and the Italian Lakes (26th ed.), Leipzig: Karl Baedeker, 1922, OCLC 4248970, OL 23344482M

Preceded by Dornbirn, Austria (2007)	World Gymnaestrada host city 2011	Succeeded by Helsinki, Finland (2015)
