= Élie =

Élie is the French equivalent of "Elie", "Elias" or "Elijah." Related spellings include Elia, Elias, Élias, Hélie and Hélias.

People with the given name include:

- Élie, duc Decazes (1780–1860), French politician
- Élie Aboud (born 1959), Lebanese-French politician
- Élie Allégret (1865–1940), French Protestant pastor and missionary
- Élie Barnavi (born 1946), Israeli ambassador to France between 2000 and 2002
- Élie Baup (1955) French football manager and former goalkeeper
- Élie Bayol (1914–1995), French racing driver
- Élie Benoist (1640–1728), French Protestant minister and historian of the Edict of Nantes
- Élie Berthet (1815–1891), French novelist
- Élie Bertrand (1713–1797), Swiss French geologist
- Élie Bloncourt (1896–1978), Guadeloupe-born French politician
- Élie Bouhéreau (1643–1719), French Huguenot refugee in Ireland and the first librarian of Marsh's Library
- Élie Brousse (1921–2019), French rugby league footballer
- Élie Cartan (1869–1951), French mathematician
- Élie Castor (1943–1996), French Guiana politician
- Élie Chouraqui (1950) French film director
- Élie Cohen (conductor) (fl. 1920–1940), French conductor
- Élie Diodati (1576–1661), Swiss French jurist
- Élie Dohin (born 1983), French footballer
- Élie Domota (born 1963), trade union leader from Guadeloupe
- Élie Doté (born 1948), Prime Minister of the Central African Republic from 2005 to 2008
- Élie Dupuis (1994), Canadian actor
- Élie Ducommun (1833-1906), Swiss activist awarded the 1902 Nobel Peace Prize
- Élie Ehua (born 1992), French footballer
- Élie Faure (1873–1937), French art historian
- Élie Frédéric Forey (1804–1872), Marshal of France
- Élie Catherine Fréron (1719–1776), French writer and controversialist
- Élie Fruchart (1922–2003), French footballer
- Élie Halévy (1870–1937), French historian
- Élie Halévy (Chalfan) (1760–1826), French Hebrew poet and author
- Élie Hoarau (born 1938), politician in Réunion
- Élie Kakou (1960–1999), Tunisian-French actor and standup comedian born Alain Kakou
- Élie Lacerte (1821–1898), Québécois/Canadian physician and politician
- Élie Lacoste (1745–1806), French politician during the French Revolution
- Élie Lellouche (born 1952), French horse trainer
- Élie Lescot (1883–1974), President of Haiti from 1941 to 1946
- Élie Mailloux (1830–1893) Québécois/Canadian politician
- Élie Metchnikoff (1845–1916), Russian biologist
- Élie Reclus (1827–1904), French anarchist and ethnographer
- Élie de Rothschild (1917–2007), French banker
- Élie Saint-Hilaire (1839–1888), Québécois/Canadian politician
- Élie Semoun (born 1963), French comedian
- Élie Vinet (1509–1587), French Renaissance humanist
- Élie Wollman (1917–2008), French geneticist
