= Persecution of Huguenots under Louis XV =

Persecution of French Protestants, 1715–1774

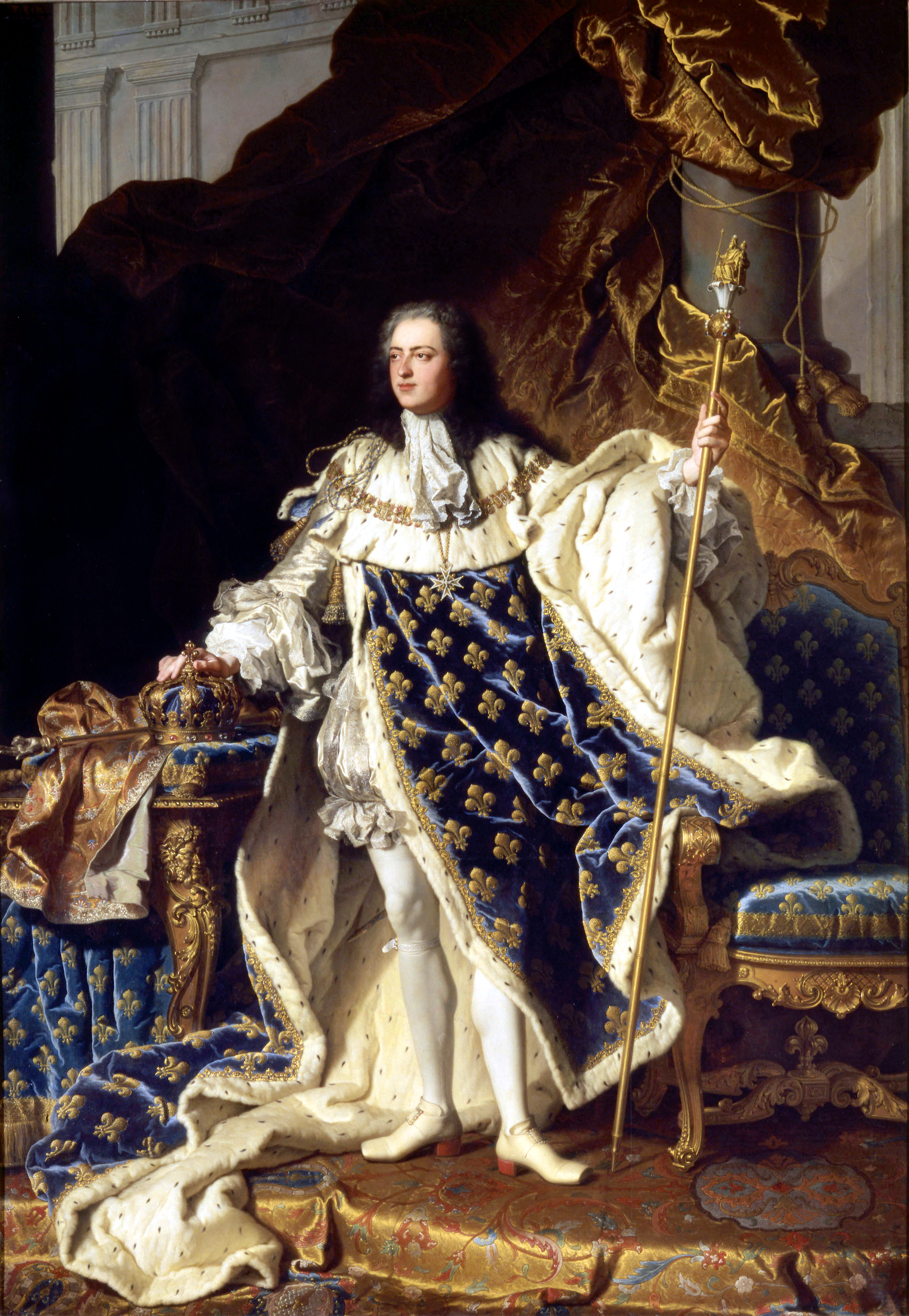
French king Louis XV by Hyacinthe Rigaud, 1730

The persecution of Huguenots under Louis XV refers to hostile activities perpetrated against a religious group of French Protestants (known as the Huguenots) between 1705 and 1724, during the reign of Louis XV.

== Under previous kings ==
The members of the Protestant religion in France, the Huguenots, had been granted substantial religious, political and military freedom by Henry IV in his Edict of Nantes. Later, following renewed warfare, they were stripped of their political and military privileges by Louis XIII, but retained their religious freedoms. This situation persisted until the personal rule of Louis XIV. Initially he sought to convert Protestants to Catholicism through peaceful means, including financial incentives, but gradually he adopted harsher measures, culminating in the use of dragonnades, a policy that stationed soldiers in the houses of Huguenots to force them to convert. In 1685, he revoked the Edict of Nantes altogether, abolishing all rights of Protestants in the kingdom.

Under this duress, many Protestants converted to Catholicism; others fled the country. Those who converted, however, usually did so only outwardly as crypto-Protestants, also called Nicodemites. As soon as the vigilance of the government was relaxed, they neglected the service of the Catholic Church, and, when they dared, they met in their houses or in the open for the worship of their own faith. In truth, the number of Protestants who truly became Catholics and passed on their faith to their children was insignificant.

The penalties for preaching or attending a Protestant assembly were severe: life terms in the galleys for men, imprisonment for women, and confiscation of all property were common.

Beginning in 1702, a group of Protestants in the region of the Cévennes mountains, known as the Camisards, revolted against the government. Fighting largely ceased after 1704, only to resume in 1710 and continue sporadically for the next five years. Protestantism continued to be suppressed in France until the death of Louis XIV in 1715.

== Under Louis XV ==
As Louis XV was only five years old when he became king, France came under the rule of a regent, Philippe II, Duke of Orléans (in office from 1715 to 1723). The Regent had little interest in continuing the persecution of Protestants. While the kingdom's laws did not change, their application diminished. Protestants began once more to celebrate their religion, especially in regions such as Languedoc, the Dauphiné, Guyenne, and Poitou. Nevertheless, there remained those who advocated rigor in the treatment of the Protestants. Prominent among these, the Archbishop of Rouen, Louis de La Vergne-Montenard de Tressan, became the grand almoner to the Regent. He argued with both the Regent and the most influential minister, Cardinal Dubois, in favour of severe measures against the Protestants. They rejected his ideas.

After Louis Henri, Duke of Bourbon became premier in 1723, however, the bishop found in him a more receptive audience, and he was given permission to draw up a general law against "l'hérésie". The King promulgated a law on 14 May 1724, which stated the following:

Of all the grand designs of our most honoured lord and great-grandfather, there is none that we have more at heart to carry out than that which he conceived, of entirely extinguishing heresy in his kingdom. Arrived at majority, our first care has been to have before us the edicts whereof execution has been delayed, especially in the provinces afflicted with the contagion. We have observed that the chief abuses which demand a speedy remedy relate to illicit assemblies, the education of children, the obligation of public functionaries to profess the Catholic religion, the penalties against the relapsed, and the celebration of marriage, regarding which here are our intentions: Shall be condemned: preachers to the penalty of death, their accomplices to the galleys for life, and women to be shaved and imprisoned for life. Confiscation of property: parents who shall not have baptism administered to their children within twenty-four hours, and see that they attend regularly the catechism and the schools, to fines and such sums as they may amount to together; even to greater penalties. Midwives, physicians, surgeons, apothecaries, domestics, relatives, who shall not notify the parish priests of births or illnesses, to fines. Persons who shall exhort the sick, to the galleys or imprisonment for life, according to sex; confiscation of property. The sick who shall refuse the sacraments, if they recover, to banishment for life; if they die, to be dragged on a hurdle. Desert-marriages are illegal; the children born of them are incompetent to inherit. Minors whose parents are expatriated may marry without their authority; but parents whose children are on foreign soil shall not consent to their marriage, on pain of the galleys for the men and banishment for the women. Finally, of all fines and confiscations, half shall be employed in providing subsistence for the new converts.

The law equalled, and even surpassed in some measures, the most severe proclamations of Louis XIV. However, times had changed. Louis XIV's decrees against the Protestants had been greeted by the majority of the country with enthusiasm. But the clergy had not sought the 1724 edict; it was "the work of an ambitious man [Tressan] backed up by certain fanatics". The magistrates, too, were not as enthusiastic as the public in their application of the edict.

Serious discrimination took place only where the local authorities were strict and loyal to the edict. It mostly occurred in southern France, especially in the dioceses of Nîmes and Uzès, and in Dauphiné. Protestant preachers and/or leaders active during this period in France included Antoine Court, Paul Rabaut, Alexander Ramsey, and Roger. They often lived as nomads in wilderness areas in order to avoid capture.

Historians estimate that the number of men and women imprisoned or sent to the galleys for religious offences in the 40 years following the edict of 1724 was almost two thousand. According to Antoine Court, eight ministers were executed in this period. This was a much lower rate than had occurred during the later part of Louis XIV's reign.

Toulon was the centre where most of the men committed to the galleys for religious crimes served their sentences.

Letters of one of its inmates and the accounts of witnesses such as Marie Durand tell of the dreary and desolate women's prison, the Tower of Constance at Aigues-Mortes. Through the efforts of the Prince of Beauvau, the dozen or so women held there were finally released in 1767.

In the decades following 1724, enthusiasm for the persecution of Protestants continued to wane; after 1764 they "enjoyed a practical toleration for a quarter of a century before the law secured them a legal toleration" by the Edict of Versailles in 1787.

== Sources ==
- Guizot, History of France. Transl. from the French by Robert Black. No date, but a publisher's note is dated 1876; New York; Klemscott Society. vol. 6, p. 110ff.
- Ernest Lavisse, Histoire de France, reprinted from the editions of 1900–1911, Paris. 1969, New York; AMS Press, Inc. Vol. VIII, part 2.
- James Breck Perkins, France Under Louis XV, vol. i. 1897, Boston; Houghton Mifflin Co.
