= Rabaut =

Surname

Rabaut is a surname. Notable people with the surname include:

- Jean-Paul Rabaut Saint-Étienne (1743–1793), French revolutionary
- Louis C. Rabaut (1886–1961), politician from the U.S. state of Michigan
- Paul Rabaut (1718–1794), French pastor of the Huguenot "Church of the Desert"
