= 2017 EMF EURO =

Tournament details
- Host country: Czech Republic
- Dates: 9–17 June
- Teams: 24
- Venue: 1 (in 1 host city)

Final positions
- Champions: Russia (1st title)
- Runners-up: Czech Republic
- Third place: Hungary
- Fourth place: Romania

Tournament statistics
- Matches played: 52
- Goals scored: 178 (3.42 per match)
- Top scorer(s): (Croatia) Ivan Smok (5) (Czech Republic) Patrik Levčík (5) (Czech Republic) Michal Salák (5) (Montenegro) Mirko Klikovac (5)

The 2017 EMF Euro was the eighth edition of the EMF miniEURO for national Small-sided football teams, and the fifth governed by the European Minifootball Federation. It took place in Brno, Czech Republic, from 9 to 17 June 2017.

The final tournament was contested by 24 teams.

== Draw ==
The final tournament draw was held in Hotel Bobycentrum in Brno on 29 March 2017.

== Group stage ==
Key to colours in group tables
Team advanced to the knockout stage

=== Group A ===
Team	Pld	W	D	L	GF	GA	GD	Pts
Hungary	3	3	0	0	9	1	+8	9
Czech Republic	3	2	0	1	13	1	+12	6
Israel	3	1	0	2	4	13	−9	3
Latvia	3	0	0	3	1	12	−11	0

9 June 2017
21:30

Czech Republic	0–1	Hungary
	Report	Richárd Cseszneki 29'

Brno
10 June 2017
20:00

Latvia	0–4	Israel
	Report	Oleg Kuzmin 19', 34'; Sharon Adani 24'; Yehonatan Zeharia 38'

Brno
11 June 2017
16:00

Hungary	6–0	Israel
Imre Bozsoki 10'; Róbert Fekete 17'; Szabolcs Somogyi 22'; Imre Lak 33'; Ferenc Béres 35'; Csaba Poncok 39'	Report

Brno
11 June 2017
21:45

Czech Republic	6–0	Latvia
Patrik Levčík 34', 37'; Michal Salák 10'; Jan Koudelka 29'; Ondřej Paděra 34'; Michal Uhlíř 40'	Report

Brno
12 June 2017
20:00

Hungary	2–1	Latvia
Márkó Sós 25'; Imre Lak 37'	Report	Andrejs Sitiks 41'

Brno
13 June 2017
20:15

Czech Republic	7–0	Israel
Michal Uhlíř 3'; Jan Koudelka 7'; Stanislav Mařík 7'; Tomáš Mica 9'; Ondřej Paděra 23'; Michal Salák 28'; Bohumír Doubravský 35'	Report

Brno

=== Group B ===
Team	Pld	W	D	L	GF	GA	GD	Pts
Bulgaria	3	2	1	0	7	5	+2	7
Poland	3	1	1	1	3	2	+1	4
Ukraine	3	1	0	2	3	5	−2	3
Germany	3	1	0	2	5	6	−1	3

10 June 2017
15:00

Poland	2–0	Ukraine
Bartłomiej Dębicki 16'; Ariel Mnochy 35'	Report

Brno
10 June 2017
18:00

Germany	3–4	Bulgaria
Jörg Wagner 17'; Dominic Reinold 30'; Kevin Hildach 33'	Report	Dobrin Mihaylov 14'; Nikolay Petrov 18'; Martin Kostov 19'; Nedelyan Kostadinov 41'

Brno
11 June 2017
14:00

Poland	1–1	Bulgaria
Ariel Mnochy 15'	Report	Georgi Nedyalkov 24'

Brno
11 June 2017
18:00

Germany	1–2	Ukraine
Gerbi Kaplan 40'	Report	Artem Gordienko 37', 41'

Brno
12 June 2017
21:00

Germany	1–0	Poland
Florian Thamm 37'	Report

Brno
12 June 2017
22:00

Bulgaria	2–1	Ukraine
Aleksey Stepanov 15'; Dobrin Mihaylov 21'	Report	Pavlo Bovtunenko 26'

Brno

=== Group C ===
Team	Pld	W	D	L	GF	GA	GD	Pts
Russia	3	2	0	1	5	2	+3	6
Slovakia	3	1	1	1	8	4	+4	4
Turkey	3	1	1	1	5	5	0	4
Spain	3	1	0	2	3	10	−7	3

10 June 2017
19:00

Spain	0–5	Slovakia
	Report	Martin Mráz 20'; Erik Szabo 27'; Ludovit Felix 31'; Ivan Buchel 35'; Matej Vašíček 38'

Brno
10 June 2017
21:00

Russia	0–1	Turkey
	Report	Ogün Bayrak 11'

Brno
11 June 2017
15:00

Spain	3–2	Turkey
Marcos Menéndez García 1'; Sergi Talavera Codina 29'; Pablo Ardura García 30'	Report	Mehmet Kurt 23'; Hakan Gönül 38'

Brno
11 June 2017
17:00

Russia	2–1	Slovakia
Valerii Likhobabenko 14'; Mikhail Merkulov 22'	Report	Silvestr Jager 30'

Brno
13 June 2017
15:00

Russia	3–0	Spain
Erik Korchagin 22', 39'; Aleksandr Kuksov 9'	Report

Brno
13 June 2017
19:00

Slovakia	2–2	Turkey
Ludovit Felix 30'; Silvestr Jager 35'	Report	Barış Demir 6'; Ogün Bayrak 28'

Brno

=== Group D ===
Team	Pld	W	D	L	GF	GA	GD	Pts
Romania	3	2	1	0	7	3	+4	7
Kazakhstan	3	1	1	1	6	4	+2	4
Greece	3	1	1	1	4	6	−2	4
Portugal	3	0	1	2	1	5	−4	1

10 June 2017
13:00

Kazakhstan	3–0	Portugal
Murat Akhmetsharipov 6', 37'; Olzhas Taibassarov 7'	Report

Brno
10 June 2017
17:00

Romania	4–1	Greece
Calugareanu George Adrian 8'; Vlad Claudiu 11'; Pusca Costin Cristian 16'; Vincene Toma 38'	Report	Nikolaos Stamos 37'

Brno
11 June 2017
19:00

Kazakhstan	1–1	Greece
Olzhas Taibassarov 6'	Report	Nikolaos Stamos 30'

Brno
11 June 2017
20:00

Romania	0–0	Portugal
	Report

Brno
13 June 2017
18:00

Romania	3–2	Kazakhstan
Vincene Toma 8'; Vlad Claudiu 28'; Tanase Gabriel 39'	Report	Azamat Khassenov 9'; Nurzhan Abdrassilov 17'

Brno
13 June 2017
22:15

Greece	2–1	Portugal
Nikolaos Stamos 41', 41'	Report	João Paulo 30'

Brno

=== Group E ===
Team	Pld	W	D	L	GF	GA	GD	Pts
Bosnia and Herzegovina	3	2	1	0	9	3	+6	7
Montenegro	3	1	2	0	7	5	+2	5
Serbia	3	1	1	1	4	4	0	4
Italy	3	0	0	3	2	10	−8	0

10 June 2017
14:00

Bosnia and Herzegovina	4–0	Italy
Robert Đotlo 16', 39'; Marko Vujica 13'; Marin Jukić 34'	Report

Brno
10 June 2017
16:00

Montenegro	1–1	Serbia
Mirko Klikovac 39'	Report	Dragan Mitrović 16'

Brno
12 June 2017
16:00

Montenegro	3–1	Italy
Mirko Klikovac 22', 34'; Saša Vukčević 30'	Report	Saverio Mastrojanni 39'

Brno
12 June 2017
18:00

Bosnia and Herzegovina	2–0	Serbia
Goran Lovrinović 17', 40'	Report

Brno
13 June 2017
17:00

Montenegro	3–3	Bosnia and Herzegovina
Ivan Tomašević 10', 22'; Mirko Klikovac 33'	Report	Mirza Zahirović 31'; Goran Lovrinović 35'; Andreas Berović 36'

Brno
13 June 2017
21:15

Serbia	3–1	Italy
Veselin Guberinić 10', 20'; Dejan Jevtić 35'	Report	Massimiliano Berardini 12'

Brno

=== Group F ===
Team	Pld	W	D	L	GF	GA	GD	Pts
Slovenia	3	3	0	0	5	2	+3	9
France	3	2	0	1	14	3	+11	6
Croatia	3	1	0	2	12	3	+9	3
Belgium	3	0	0	3	1	24	−23	0

10 June 2017
12:00

Slovenia	2–1	Belgium
Dejan Kos 6'; Amar Jamaković 15'	Report	Alix Gilsoul 13'

Brno
10 June 2017
22:00

Croatia	1–2	France
Josip Gusković 23'	Report	23' (o.g.); Christophe Perrin 35'

Brno
12 June 2017
17:00

Slovenia	2–1	France
David Šajnović 21'; Mak Karabegović 32'	Report	Omar Belbachir 39'

Brno
12 June 2017
19:00

Croatia	11–0	Belgium
Ivan Smok 14', 17', 39', 40', 40'; Mario Orlović 11', 12'; Josip Gusković 17', 29'; Antun Hercigonja 10'; Zoran Lukavečki 25'	Report

Brno
13 June 2017
14:00

France France	11–0	Belgium
Bruno Meilhon 8', 31'; Jérôme Boulin 12', 35'; Nicolas Huertos 3'; Labaig Romain 6'; 15' (o.g.); Elie Dohin 18'; Christophe Perrin 25'; Mickael Senac 26'; Nicolas Le 27'	Report

Brno
13 June 2017
16:00

Croatia	0–1	Slovenia
	Report	Amar Jamaković 34'

Brno

=== Ranking of third-placed teams ===
Grp	Team	Pld	W	D	L	GF	GA	GD	Pts
C	Turkey	3	1	1	1	5	5	0	4
E	Serbia	3	1	1	1	4	4	0	4
D	Greece	3	1	1	1	4	6	−2	4
F	Croatia	3	1	0	2	12	3	+9	3
B	Ukraine	3	1	0	2	3	5	−2	3
A	Israel	3	1	0	2	4	13	−9	3

== Knockout stage ==
=== Bracket ===
Round of 16
14 June, 14:00
Hungary	1
Turkey	0
14 June, 15:15
Poland	2
Montenegro	1
14 June, 16:30
Slovenia	2 (3)
Greece	2 (2)
14 June, 17:45
Russia	1 (3)
Kazakhstan	1 (2)
14 June, 19:00
Romania	4
Serbia	1
14 June, 21:15
Slovakia	1
France	2
14 June, 22:30
Bosnia and Herzegovina	1
Croatia	0
14 June, 20:15
Bulgaria	0
Czech Republic	1

Quarter-finals
15 June, 17:30
Hungary	1 (3)
Poland	1 (2)
15 June, 21:15
Slovenia	0
Russia	1
15 June, 20:00
Romania	1
France	0
15 June, 18:45
Bosnia and Herzegovina	0
Czech Republic	4

Semi-finals
16 June, 19:30
Hungary	0
Russia	3
16 June, 21:00
Romania	3
Czech Republic	4

Final
17 June, 20:00
Russia	1 (3)
Czech Republic	1 (2)
Third place
17 June, 18:00
Hungary	0 (3)
Romania	0 (2)

=== Round of 16 ===
14 June 2017
14:00

Hungary	1–0	Turkey
Zsolt Szabó 12'	Report

Brno
14 June 2017
15:15

Poland	2–1	Montenegro
Ariel Mnochy 31', 40'	Report	Mirko Klikovac 36'

Brno
14 June 2017
16:30

Slovenia	2–2 (penalty: 3–2)	Greece
Dejan Kos 3', 19'	Report	Dimitrios Gkialis 2'; Stefanos Giotis 30'

Brno
14 June 2017
17:45

Russia	1–1 (penalty: 3–2)	Kazakhstan
Anton Kulagin 33'	Report	Kassim Boziyev 22'

Brno
14 June 2017
19:00

Romania	4–1	Serbia
Calugareanu George Adrian 14'; Vlad Claudiu 15'; Burciu Radu Marian 19'; Bobe Bogdan Gabriel 40'	Report	Veselin Guberinić 22'

Brno
14 June 2017
20:15

Bulgaria	0–1	Czech Republic
	Report	Patrik Levčík 33'

Brno
14 June 2017
21:15

Slovakia	1–2	France
Erik Szabo 42'	Report	Omar Belbachir 17', 18'

Brno
14 June 2017
22:30

Bosnia and Herzegovina	1–0	Croatia
Marin Jukić 39'	Report

Brno

=== Quarter-finals ===
15 June 2017
17:30

Hungary	1–1 (penalty: 3–2)	Poland
Ferenc Béres 38'	Report	Cezary Szałek 8'

Brno
15 June 2017
18:45

Bosnia and Herzegovina	0–4	Czech Republic
	Report	Michal Salák 30', 31'; František Hakl 13'; Jan Koudelka 39'

Brno
15 June 2017
20:00

Romania	1–0	France
Popa Ioan Mircea 7'	Report

Brno
15 June 2017
21:15

Slovenia	0–1	Russia
	Report	Sergey Faustov 31'

Brno

=== Semi finals ===
16 June 2017
19:30

Hungary	0–3	Russia
	Report	Aleksei Medvedev 17'; Valerii Likhobabenko 30', 41'

Brno
16 June 2017
21:00

Romania	3–4	Czech Republic
Burciu Radu Marian 20'; Vlad Claudiu 20+4'; Leu Stefan 40+5'	Report	David Bednář 12'; Patrik Levčík 21', 31'; Michal Salák 39'

Brno

=== Bronze medal game ===
17 June 2017
18:00

Hungary	0–0 (penalty:3–2)	Romania
	Report

Brno

=== Final ===
17 June 2017
20:00

Russia	1–1 (penalty:3–2)	Czech Republic
Aleksei Medvedev 24'	Report	Stanislav Mařík 16'

Brno

== Final ranking ==
Pos	Team	Pld	W	D	L	GF	GA	GD	Pts	Result
1	Russia	7	4	2	1	11	4	+7	14	1st
2	Czech Republic	7	5	1	1	23	5	+18	16	2nd
3	Hungary	7	4	2	1	11	5	+6	14	3rd
4	Romania	7	4	2	1	15	8	+7	14	4th
5	Bosnia and Herzegovina	5	3	1	1	10	7	+3	10	Eliminated in the quarter-finals
6	Slovenia	5	3	1	1	7	5	+2	10	Eliminated in the quarter-finals
7	France	5	3	0	2	16	5	+11	9	Eliminated in the quarter-finals
8	Poland	5	2	2	1	6	4	+2	8	Eliminated in the quarter-finals
9	Bulgaria	4	2	1	1	7	6	+1	7	Eliminated in the round of 16
10	Kazakhstan	4	1	2	1	7	5	+2	5	Eliminated in the round of 16
11	Montenegro	4	1	2	1	8	7	+1	5	Eliminated in the round of 16
12	Greece	4	1	2	1	6	8	−2	5	Eliminated in the round of 16
13	Slovakia	4	1	1	2	9	6	+3	4	Eliminated in the round of 16
14	Turkey	4	1	1	2	5	6	−1	4	Eliminated in the round of 16
15	Serbia	4	1	1	2	5	8	−3	4	Eliminated in the round of 16
16	Croatia	4	1	0	3	12	4	+8	3	Eliminated in the round of 16
17	Germany	3	1	0	2	5	6	−1	3	Eliminated in the group stage
18	Ukraine	3	1	0	2	3	5	−2	3	Eliminated in the group stage
19	Spain	3	1	0	2	3	10	−7	3	Eliminated in the group stage
20	Israel	3	1	0	2	4	13	−9	3	Eliminated in the group stage
21	Portugal	3	0	1	2	1	5	−4	1	Eliminated in the group stage
22	Italy	3	0	0	3	2	10	−8	0	Eliminated in the group stage
23	Latvia	3	0	0	3	1	12	−11	0	Eliminated in the group stage
24	Belgium	3	0	0	3	1	24	−23	0	Eliminated in the group stage

== Goalscorers ==
There have been 178 goals scored in 52 matches, for an average of 3.42 goals per match.

5 goals

- (Croatia) Ivan Smok
- (Czech Republic) Patrik Levčík
- (Czech Republic) Michal Salák
- (Montenegro) Mirko Klikovac

4 goals

- (Greece) Nikolaos Stamos
- (Poland) Ariel Mnochy
- (Romania) Vlad Claudiu

3 goals

- (Bosnia and Herzegovina) Goran Lovrinović
- (Croatia) Josip Gusković
- (Czech Republic) Jan Koudelka
- (France) Omar Belbachir
- (Russia) Valerii Likhobabenko
- (Serbia) Veselin Guberinić
- (Slovenia) Dejan Kos

2 goals

- (Bosnia and Herzegovina) Robert Đotlo
- (Bosnia and Herzegovina) Marin Jukić
- (Bulgaria) Dobrin Mihaylov
- (Croatia) Mario Orlović
- (Czech Republic) Ondřej Paděra
- (Czech Republic) Michal Uhlíř
- (Czech Republic) Stanislav Mařík
- (France) Jérôme Boulin
- (France) Bruno Meilhon
- (France) Christophe Perrin
- (Hungary) Ferenc Béres
- (Hungary) Imre Lak
- (Israel) Oleg Kuzmin
- (Kazakhstan) Murat Akhmetsharipov
- (Kazakhstan) Olzhas Taibassarov
- (Montenegro) Ivan Tomašević
- (Romania) Calugareanu George Adrian
- (Romania) Vincene Toma
- (Romania) Burciu Radu Marian
- (Russia) Erik Korchagin
- (Russia) Aleksei Medvedev
- (Slovakia) Ludovit Felix
- (Slovakia) Silvestr Jager
- (Slovakia) Erik Szabo
- (Slovenia) Amar Jamaković
- (Turkey) Ogün Bayrak
- (Ukraine) Artem Gordienko

1 goal

- (Belgium) Alix Gilsoul
- (Bosnia and Herzegovina) Andreas Berović
- (Bosnia and Herzegovina) Marko Vujica
- (Bosnia and Herzegovina) Mirza Zahirović
- (Bulgaria) Nedelyan Kostadinov
- (Bulgaria) Martin Kostov
- (Bulgaria) Georgi Nedyalkov
- (Bulgaria) Nikolay Petrov
- (Bulgaria) Aleksey Stepanov
- (Croatia) Antun Hercigonja
- (Croatia) Zoran Lukavečki
- (Czech Republic) Bohumír Doubravský
- (Czech Republic) František Hakl
- (Czech Republic) Tomáš Mica
- (Czech Republic) David Bednář
- (Spain) Sergi Talavera Codina
- (Spain) Marcos Menéndez García
- (Spain) Pablo Ardura García
- (France) Elie Dohin
- (France) Nicolas Huertos
- (France) Nicolas Le
- (France) Labaig Romain
- (France) Mickael Senac
- (Germany) Kevin Hildach
- (Germany) Gerbi Kaplan
- (Germany) Dominic Reinold
- (Germany) Florian Thamm
- (Germany) Jörg Wagner
- (Greece) Stefanos Giotis
- (Greece) Dimitrios Gkialis
- (Hungary) Imre Bozsoki
- (Hungary) Richárd Cseszneki
- (Hungary) Róbert Fekete
- (Hungary) Csaba Poncok
- (Hungary) Szabolcs Somogyi
- (Hungary) Márkó Sós
- (Hungary) Zsolt Szabó
- (Italy) Massimiliano Berardini
- (Italy) Saverio Mastrojanni
- (Israel) Sharon Adani
- (Israel) Yehonatan Zeharia
- (Kazakhstan) Nurzhan Abdrassilov
- (Kazakhstan) Kassim Boziyev
- (Kazakhstan) Azamat Khassenov
- (Latvia) Andrejs Sitiks
- (Montenegro) Saša Vukčević
- (Poland) Bartłomiej Dębicki
- (Poland) Cezary Szałek
- (Portugal) João Paulo
- (Romania) Pusca Costin Cristian
- (Romania) Bobe Bogdan Gabriel
- (Romania) Tanase Gabriel
- (Romania) Popa Ioan Mircea
- (Romania) Leu Stefan
- (Russia) Sergey Faustov
- (Russia) Aleksandr Kuksov
- (Russia) Anton Kulagin
- (Russia) Mikhail Merkulov
- (Serbia) Dejan Jevtić
- (Serbia) Dragan Mitrović
- (Slovakia) Ivan Buchel
- (Slovakia) Martin Mráz
- (Slovakia) Matej Vašíček
- (Slovenia) Mak Karabegović
- (Slovenia) David Šajnović
- (Turkey) Barış Demir
- (Turkey) Hakan Gönül
- (Turkey) Mehmet Kurt
- (Ukraine) Pavlo Bovtunenko
