= Benjamin Du Plan =

French Huguenot leader

Benjamin Ribot, Seigneur du Caila et Du Plan (13 March 1688 – July 1763) was a leader of the French Huguenots.

He was born into a Protestant family at the Château de la Favède, northwest of Alès. Receiving a military education, he became an officer under the name of Du Caila, but abandoned this profession in 1710 in order to promote the Protestant faith.

In 1715, the same year that Louis XIV died, he met Antoine Court; they became friends and worked together, occasionally clashing on the subject of the inspirés, whom Du Plan admired. At the Synod of Nîmes in 1725 he was named Deputy General of the Reformed Churches of France. He spent four years at Geneva and one in Lausanne, where he helped Court found a seminary in 1729. He then travelled through Protestant Europe, pleading the Huguenots' cause and arranging financial support for the exiles. His efforts were often ineffective, and he was wounded by criticisms he received on this account.

In 1738 he settled in England, where he continued to help French refugees. His integrity was called into question, and he was attacked for his support of the inspirés. He fell into destitution in 1744, only re-establishing himself in 1749, and achieving a certain amount of rehabilitation in 1751.He married Mrs Elizabeth Denman ( née de Voutron)in 1751 and had two children, Andre 1755 (died 1781)and Mary Francoise 1753 who married John Lloyd in 1793.

Benjamin died at Kentish Town, London in July 1763.

== Bibliography ==
- Daniel Bonnefon. Benjamin Du Plan, gentilhomme d'Alais. Député-Général des Eglises Réformées de France, 1688-1763. France: Sandoz et Fischbacher, 1876.
- E. Clot. Benjamin du Plan et la fondation du séminaire de Lausanne. 1909
- C. Lasserre. Le séminaire de Lausanne (1726-1812). 1997, 183-224
- H. Bost, C. Lauriol, ed. Entre Désert et Europe, le pasteur Antoine Court (1695-1760). 1998
