= Conventicle =

Small, unofficial religious meeting of laypeople

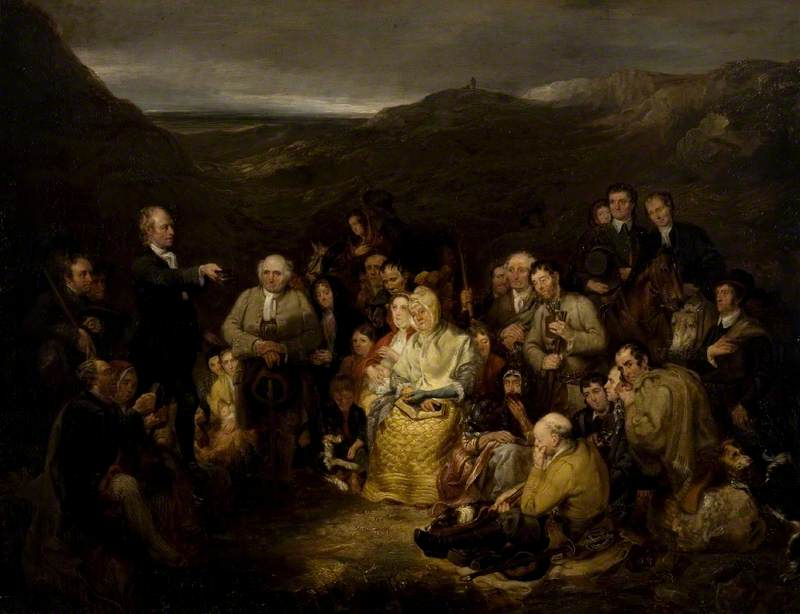
A Covenanters' conventicle. The Covenanters' Preaching, painting by George Harvey

A conventicle originally meant "an assembly" and was frequently used by ancient writers to mean "a church." At a semantic level, conventicle is a Latinized synonym of the Greek word for church, and references Jesus' promise in Matthew 18:20, "Where two or three are met together in my name."

Over time, the term became linked to meetings of religious associations, particularly private gatherings for worship. Later, it became a negative term, implying that those within a conventicle opposed the ruling ecclesiastical authorities; for example, as applied to a plot of mutinous monks in a monastery.

Ultimately, this term has been applied to religious meetings of dissenters from an established church, held in places that were not recognized as intended for the exercise of religious functions. In this context, the state made a distinction between the forms of religion whose practices were authorized by statute, and those that were expressly prohibited. This usage has received legal sanction in Britain.

== Jesus' disciples as conventiclers ==
By one accepted usage of the word, Church historians assert that Christianity rose ecclesiastically from a conventicle. Such was the meeting in the Upper Room of the first disciples of Christ after the Ascension (Acts 1:13).

This gathering was the type that might take place for prayer, mutual edification, and memorial observances in private houses such as that of Mary, the mother of John (Acts 12:12). Within a short time, those gathered were deemed suspicious by Jewish ecclesiastical authorities, who branded the new faith as heretical, and sought to suppress these conventicles, one of their most zealous agents being the future Apostle Paul.

== Conventicles in the early Roman Empire ==
When Christianity spread throughout the Roman Empire, it was at first tolerated and enjoyed government protection, along with many other popular cults. Religions had to receive a license from the state in those times. Largely due to political considerations, Christianity soon became suspect, and no longer encouraged. Its meetings thus became conventicles.

Historians have used the term to characterize such house meetings as mentioned in Col 4:15. In the succeeding century, the catacombs were the scene of Christian conventicles.

== Conventicles in the later Roman Empire ==
With the establishment of Christianity by Constantine as the state religion, all its meetings were legitimized. In the 4th and 5th centuries, the term conventicle could apply to the meetings of such Christian nonconformists as the Montanists and the Donatists, which were prohibited by the state under penalty of death. This policy was rigorously encouraged by the leaders of the churches enjoying state recognition and support. The 6th canon of the Synod of Gangra denounces conventicles.

== Conventicles in pre-Reformation Europe ==
In England, the word was applied to the meetings of the followers of Wyclif, who, thinking of regular clergy as incompetent, sent out wandering preachers to meet the spiritual needs of the people. Both the practice and the word conventicle were carried by the anti-Roman Catholic Lollards (as the most determined supporters of Wyclif were called) to Scotland.

== England under the Tudors ==
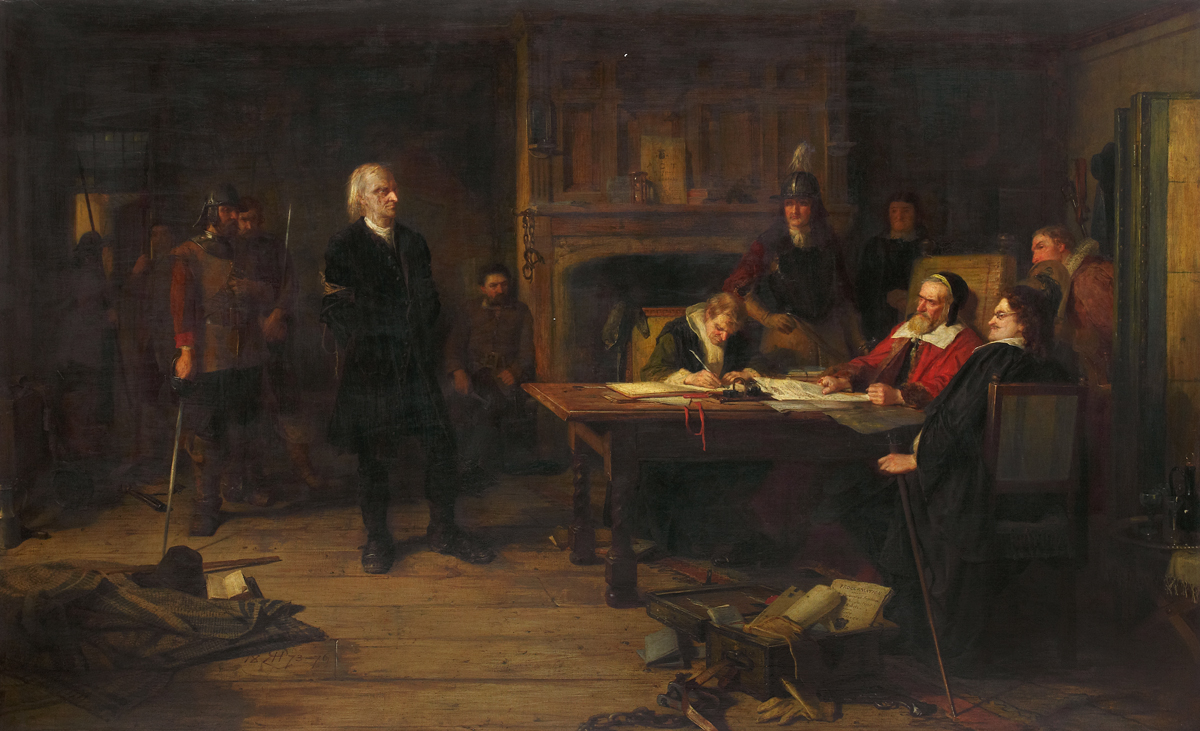
A Conventicle Preacher before the Justices, painting by Robert Inerarity Herdman

It was not until after the Reformation that 'conventicle' gained a legal connotation: descriptive of the meeting place or assemblage for worship or consultation of those who departed from the Established Church of England. Queen Elizabeth, in her contest with Puritanism, supported the Act of Uniformity, which demanded that all subjects of the Realm must conform to the tenets of the Church established by law. Clerical nonconformity was punished by deposition.

As a result, many ministers were removed so that their places either remained empty or were filled by incompetent and unpopular substitutes. Many people disliked this, and gathered together for worship in private houses or other suitable places. These conventicles were, under that label, expressly declared illegal. The 11th Article of the Book of Canons (drawn up in 1603) censures "the maintainers of conventicles"; the 12th, "the maintainers of constitutions made in conventicles"; and the 73rd says:

"Forasmuch as all conventicles and secret meetings of priests and ministers have ever been justly accounted very hateful to the state of the Church wherein they live, we do ordain that no priests or ministers of the Word of God, nor any other persons, shall meet together in any private house or elsewhere to consult upon any matter or course to be taken by them, or upon their motion or direction by any other, which may any way tend to the impeaching or depraving of the doctrine of the Church of England, or the Book of Common Prayer, or any part of the government or discipline now established in the Church of England, under pain of excommunication ipso facto."

Followers of Anabaptism, which had been spread in England by refugees from continental Europe, were ordered to leave. Even during the subsequent reign of Puritanism, Anabaptists were treated with dismissal by the Protector Cromwell, who disliked their aggressive fanaticism. There was some toleration for other persecuted sects, with only one or two exceptions.

In England, there were three acts of Parliament passed to coerce people to attend Church of England services and to prohibit unofficial meetings of laypeople:

The Religion Act 1592, stated to last for just one parliament, called for imprisonment without bail of those over the age of sixteen who failed to attend church, who persuaded others to do the same, who denied Her Majesty's authority in ecclesiastical matters, and who attended unlawful religious conventicles.

The Conventicle Act 1664 forbade conventicles of five or more people, other than an immediate family, from meeting in religious assemblies outside the auspices of the Church of England. This law was part of the Clarendon Code, named for Edward Hyde, 1st Earl of Clarendon, which aimed to discourage nonconformism and to strengthen the position of the Established Church.

The Conventicles Act 1670 imposed a fine of five shillings for the first offense and ten shillings for a second offense on any person who attended a conventicle (any religious assembly other than the Church of England). Any preacher or person who allowed his house to be used as a meeting house for such an assembly could be fined 20 and 40 shillings for a second offense.

== England under the Stuarts ==
After the Restoration of the Stuart dynasty, established Episcopacy under Charles II turned intolerant once again. An Act of Uniformity was passed in 1662, which endorsed the expulsion of any clergyman who refused to subscribe to everything contained in the Book of Common Prayer and to the doctrine of the King's religious supremacy, and held by the Solemn League and Covenant of 1643, banning such a clergyman from exercising religious functions in private houses. In one day, two thousand clergymen were ejected from the church for these reasons. In 1664, a statute called 'the Conventicle Act' made illegal any gathering in a private house for religious worship attended by a number exceeding five the regular members of the household, under penalty of fine, imprisonment, or transportation. A second version of this Act deprived the outed ministers of the right of trial by jury. The updated law empowered any justice of the peace to convict the ministers on the oath of a single informer, who was to be rewarded with a third of all fines collected. Many nonconformists were arrested.

Samuel Pepys, in his diary of August 7, 1664, observes: 'I saw several poor creatures carried by, by constables, for being at conventicles ... I would to God they would conform.' He refers to Quakers, one of the most targeted groups of the Acts. Bishop Burnet, in his History of his own Time, describes how the Quakers resolutely declined to obey the law, and fearlessly continued their prohibited meetings. Quakers would even gather in the street before their boarded-up meeting houses. Their children, who might not be arrested, would also hold conventicles in the street without their jailed parents, putting up with the taunts of unsympathetic onlookers.

== Scotland under the Stuarts ==
The people of Scotland had many reactions to the persecution of Presbyterian Christianity under James VII and Charles I. Scottish ministers did not see complete separation from the Church of Scotland as an option.

Measures were taken under Charles II to suppress Presbyterianism in Scotland, where it had been the dominant form of religion since the Reformation. From 1662 to 1678, various Acts were passed by the Privy Council and the Court of High Commission, prohibiting conventicles and imposing severe penalties upon participants. It was forbidden to supply denounced persons with meat or drink or give them any aid. When these laws failed to stop the practice, next steps invoked capital punishment. Military leaders, and even common soldiers, were given authority to immediately execute dissidents without the formality of a legal trial. This authority was used without mercy, one example being Claverhouse.

The bulk of the religious population in the south and southwest continued to attend the conventicles of the outed ministers. Where the congregation was too large for a private house, they used barns or granaries. Thousands sometimes flocked to these illegal gatherings. The result was the creation of field conventicles — meetings held under cover of night, in the open air, on moors or hills, in glens and ravines, or wherever safety and suitability could be combined. These gatherings frequently lasted for hours. At such conventicles, ordinances of the Presbyterian Church were observed. Baptism was administered, and Communion was dispensed, often to mass groups of people, the rite taking days to celebrate and several ministers officiating in turn. When capital punishment was added to the list of punishments, worshipers arrived with whatever means of self-defense they could find — scythes, flails, etc.

A Presbyterian theology covering conventicles and armed resistance to tyranny is given in Alexander Shields' work A Hind let Loose. Shields discusses the day's fundamental social, political, and ecclesiastical questions. These include (i) hearing of curates, (ii) owning of tyrants’ authority, (iii) unlawful imposed oaths, (iv) field meetings, (v) defensive arms vindicated, (vi) the extraordinary execution of judgment by private persons, and (vii) refusing to pay wicked taxations vindicated. The last-named section was added, Shields says, as an afterthought.

Royalist soldiers, aided by spies and informers, often infiltrated these meetings. One of these attacks let to the Battle of Drumclog, 11 June 1679, which issued in the only victory gained by the Covenanters (upholders of Presbyterianism), and the only defeat sustained by Claverhouse ('Bonnie Dundee'), the most zealous of their military persecutors. During the years of persecution culminating in the 'Killing Times,' it is estimated that some 18,000 people suffered in some way for attending these conventicles.

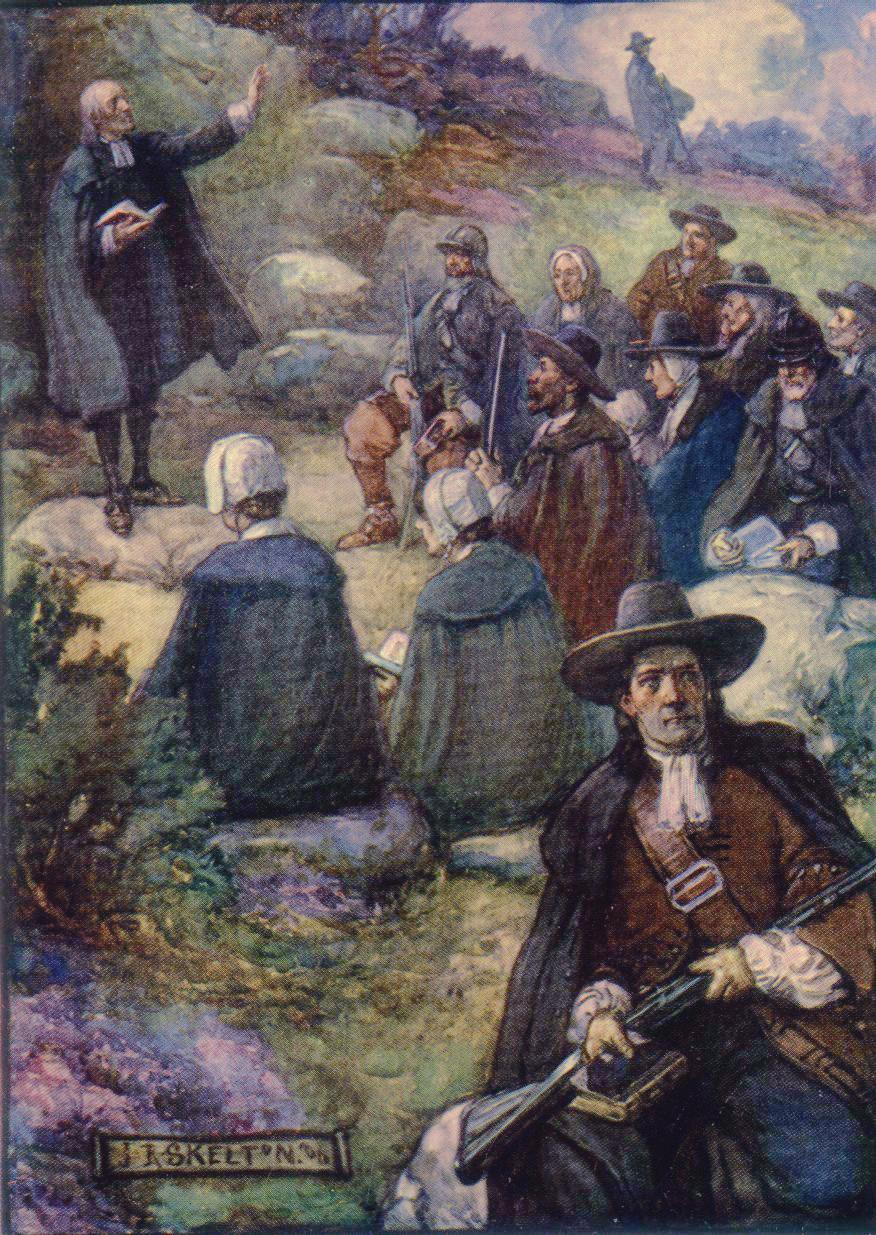
Imaginary depiction of a conventicle in progress, from H. E. Marshall's Scotland's Story (1906)

Conventicles of believers in Reform were held in Scotland in the 1500s and are considered instrumental in the movement that drove the French regent Mary of Guise from power. From 1660 to the 1688 Revolution, conventicles were usually held by Covenanters opposed to Charles II's forced imposition of Episcopalian government on the established Church of Scotland.

To protect the Presbyterian polity and Calvinist doctrine of the Church of Scotland, the pre-Restoration government of Scotland signed the 1650 Treaty of Breda with King Charles II to crown him king and support him against the English Parliamentary forces. At his Restoration in 1660, the King immediately renounced the terms of the Treaty and his Oath of Covenant, which the Scottish Covenanters saw as a betrayal.

The Rescissory Act 1661 repealed all laws made since 1633, effectively ejecting 400 ministers from their livelihoods, restoring patronage in the appointment of ministers to congregations, and allowing the King to restore Bishops to the Church of Scotland. The Abjuration Act 1662 formally rejected the National Covenant of 1638 and the Solemn League and Covenant of 1643. These were declared to be against the fundamental laws of the Kingdom. The act required all public office persons to take an oath of abjuration not to take arms against the king and reject the Covenants. This excluded most Presbyterians from holding official positions.

The resulting disappointment with Charles II's religious policy became civil unrest. It erupted in violence during the early summer of 1679 with the assassination of Archbishop Sharp, Drumclog, and the Battle of Bothwell Bridge. The Sanquhar Declaration of 1680 effectively declared the people could not accept the authority of a King who would not recognize their religion nor commit to his previous oaths. In February 1685, the King died and was succeeded by his Roman Catholic brother, the Duke of York, as King James VII.

James was eventually deposed in England in favor of his nephew, the Calvinist Stadtholder of several provinces of the Netherlands, William III of Orange and his wife, James' Protestant daughter Mary. In Scotland, a Convention of the Estates was called. At this convention, it was decided that England, having been conquered by William of Orange and his troops with little resistance, would support William and Mary's claim to the throne of Scotland. However, in the ensuing rebellion against the Williamite coup, some of James' loyal followers – the original "Jacobites," among whose ranks were many Highlanders – defeated the new Government's forces at Killiecrankie. The forces supporting the new regime included the renowned Scots Brigade – a unit of Scottish professional soldiers in Dutch service, some of whom had come over to Britain with William. It fell to a small band of men called the Cameronian Guard (after the rebel followers of the martyred Covenanter Richard Cameron) to defend the new Government in a small but significant battle fought in the streets of Dunkeld against the recently victorious Jacobites. Former rebels fought to uphold the ascendant Calvinist Protestant order in defense of the Covenant against the defenders of the old Episcopalian and Roman Catholic establishment. The Cameronians managed to hold out long enough for the government to bring reinforcements and defeat the Jacobite advance. Following that, the Cameronians, descended from victims of government-mandated "pacification" by the Scots Greys and others, were ironically wielded to police the Highlands.

Ejected preachers such as John Blackadder conducted religious ceremonies at conventicles. Many of the covenanting prisoners on the Bass Rock had been charged with attending conventicles.

== Scotland after the Revolution ==
After the Revolution of 1688 and the accession of William of Orange to the British throne, an Act of Toleration was passed, claiming that Covenanters who swore allegiance to the Crown and to the doctrinal sections of the Thirty-nine Articles would be allowed to continue their gatherings without penalty. Meeting houses were required to be registered. In Scotland, Presbyterianism was somewhat restored by the State to its ecclesiastical supremacy, although there were some Cameronian Dissenters (among others) who did not like the terms of the restoration. There was more tolerance in Scotland after the revolution, even before the Establishment of the Church of Scotland at the Act of Union.

== Low Countries ==
During the prolonged attempts of Philip II of Spain in the Netherlands to promote the Roman Catholic Church, the Protestant party headed by Les Gueux ('The Beggars') were forbidden free exercise of their worship. Field conventicles were organized all over the country, conducted by the excommunicated ministers and surrounded by armed guards.

== France ==
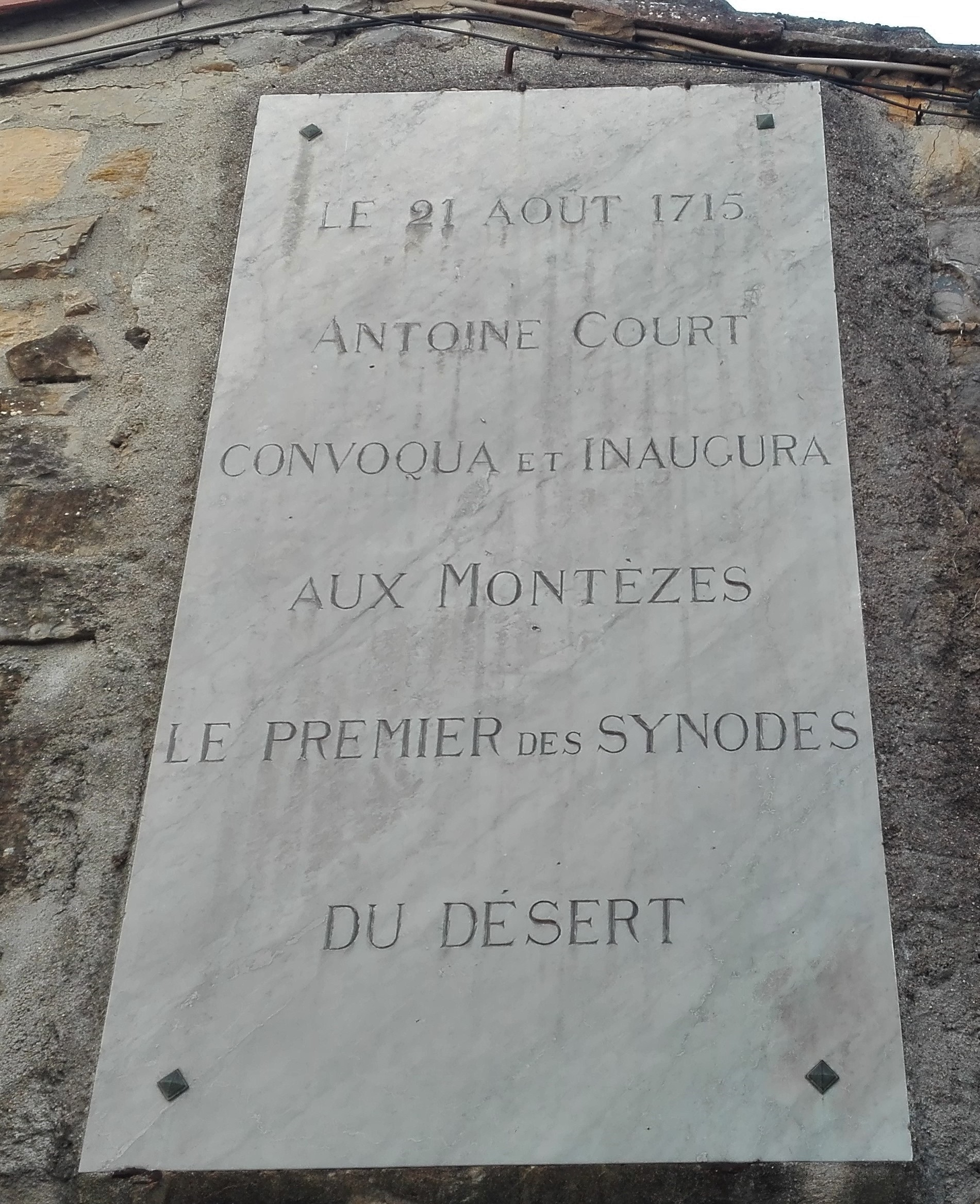
Plaque commemorating the first (clandestine) Synod of the Desert, in Les Montèzes, Cévennes, France.

Conventicles were popular in the southern districts of France during the struggle of the Huguenot Camisards (les Enfants de Dieu) against Louis XIV. Their field conventicles were called desert preachings, a Biblical reference. Antoine Court led the church while living in dens and holes in the ground. Paul Rabaut lived a similar lifestyle living as roughly, as did Alexander Peden in Scotland. A peculiarity of these Camisard gatherings was the large part played by the 'prophets' — men and women, and occasionally children, generally uneducated — who were thought to speak under direct inspiration of the Holy Spirit, after the manner of the prophets in the Church of antiquity.

In the official catholic church, conventicles were inspired by Cardinal Richelieu's vision of a unified France, spurred by the incitements of Madame de Maintenon (herself once a Huguenot), and encouraged by the great preacher Jacques-Bénigne Bossuet.

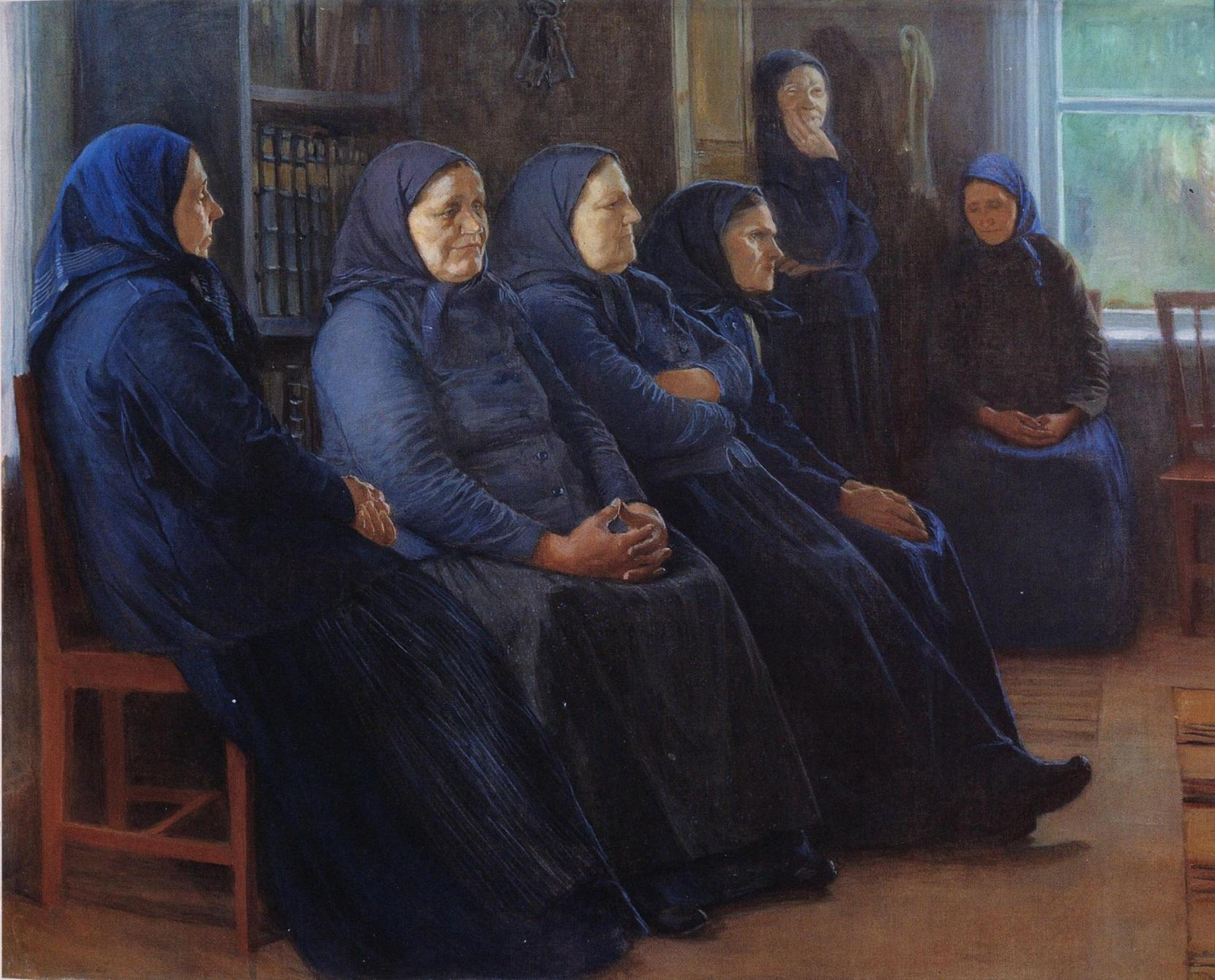
Women at the Finnish Awakening conventicle (seurat). Painting by Venny Soldan-Brofeldt

== Germany ==
In German Protestantism, the conventicle appears as a facet of Pietism. The collegia pietatis, established by Philipp Spener and his followers, provoked the strictly orthodox Lutherans. Various conflicts took place between factions of these groups. In Württemberg, a more even-handed solution was found. Those conventicles in which the principles of Lutheranism were respected received a legal sanction, while the more radical assemblages were outright banned.

== Nordic countries ==
Due to concern over possibly mixed-gender meetings, sexual impropriety, and subversive sectarianism, conventicles were condemned first by mainstream Lutheranism and then by the Pietists within decades of their inception.

In Sweden, Pietist conventicles existed as early as 1689, rousing similar oppositions. The Conventicle Act of 1726 forbade all conventicles conducted by laypeople, though private devotional meetings under the direction of the clergy were permitted. The law was not repealed until 1858 in Sweden and 1870 in Finland, which was part of Sweden until 1809. In Finland, the conventicle has remained a critical activity, especially in the Finnish Awakening revivalist movement.

Denmark–Norway had its own Conventicle Act, issued in 1741 by King Christian VI of Denmark and Norway to keep Radical Pietism in check. Norway kept the law until 1842; it was abolished after a third attempt at repeal. The law was officially repealed in Denmark in 1848.

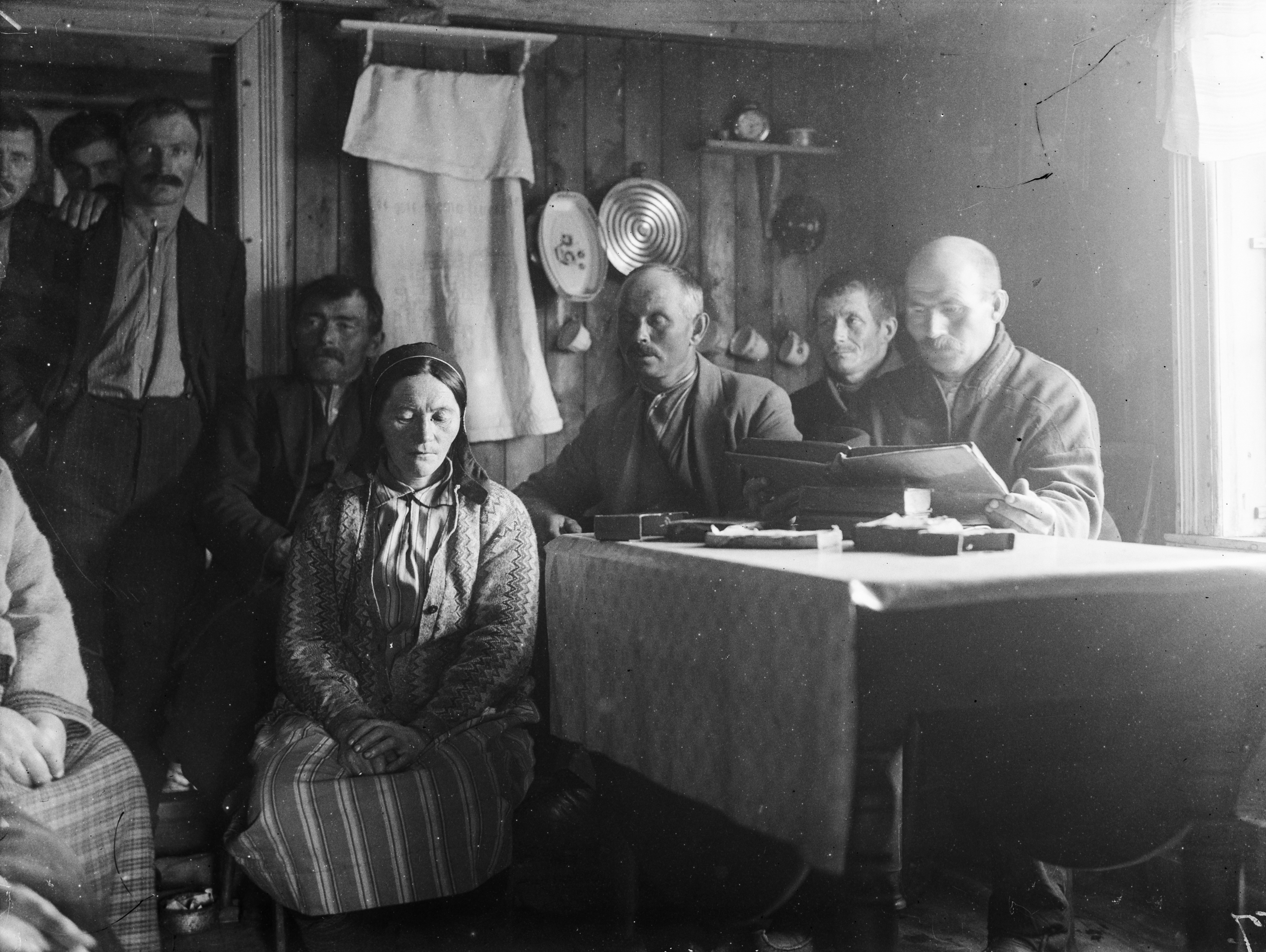
Conventicle in Nordkapp, Norway in 1931.

== Russia ==
In Russia, conventicles were held, diverging from the Orthodox Church's position of ecclesiastical supremacy. Measures of repression were occasionally directed by the Government against dissenting sects, such as the Old Believers, Stundists, and Doukhobors. Although, nonconformists of any kind who gave satisfactory assurances to the police were generally permitted liberty of worship.

== Japan ==
Japanese Christian pacifist Uchimura Kanzō founded the Non-church movement in 1901. By 1979 about 35,000 people belonged to the movement, which had spread from Japan to Taiwan and South Korea.

== United States ==
The growth of conventicles is closely related to Pietism and the Charismatic movement. In the American Lutheran Church there has been considerable debate about conventicles stemming from 17th- and 18th-century Pietism. Thompson argues that today's Lutheran mission societies, ladies' societies, youth groups, Bible studies, group devotions, Lutheran elementary and high schools, and charitable and fraternal organizations associated with the church stem from conventicles. According to C. F. W. Walther, the founder of the Lutheran Church–Missouri Synod, such movements were either opposed or carefully monitored.

According to Neville, the tradition of conventicles in Celtic lands has been carried down to the outdoor worship quite common in the American south. Neville describes these gatherings as folk traditions and rituals. New forms have arisen, such as frontier revivals, family reunions, and cemetery services, and the more recent house church movement.

== Conventicles in other religions ==
According to Smith, the mosque is a conventicle rather than an ecclesiastical institution. The mosque is an initiative of the community rather than a body led by a priesthood. In particular the Jama'at Khana (or musallah) approximates the status of a conventicle. According to Kaufman, modern-day Jewish synagogues resemble churches, whereas smaller meeting places—the shul, hevre, anshe, or shtibl—can be described as conventicle settings.

Early Mormon meetings were sometimes referred to as conventicles.

== See also ==
- Free church

== Sources ==
- Eadie, John (1862). The ecclesiastical cyclopedia, or, Dictionary of Christian antiquities and sects. London: Griffin, Bohn, and Co. p. 172.
- Elton, G. R, ed. (1982). The Tudor Constitution. Documents and Commentary (Second ed.). Cambridge University Press. pp. 458–61.
- Hunter, A. Mitchell; Hastings, James (1926). Encyclopaedia of religion and ethics. Vol. 4. Edinburgh: T. & T. Clark. pp. 102–104. This article incorporates text from this source, which is in the public domain.
- Knox, R. Buick (1989). Establishment and toleration during the reigns of William, Mary, and Anne. Edinburgh: Scottish Church History Society. pp. 330–360.
- Lindsay, Thomas M. (1908). A history of the Reformation. Edinburgh: T. & T. Clark. pp. 224–273.
- Lodge, Richard (1923). The History of England From the Restoration to the Death of William III (1660 - 1702). p. 69. OCLC 740976301.
- MacPherson, Hector (1929). "Alexander Shields, 1660-1700". Scottish Church History Society: 55–68. This article incorporates text from this source, which is in the public domain.
- McIntyre, Neil (2016). Saints and subverters: the later Covenanters in Scotland c.1648-1682 (PhD). University of Strathclyde. p. 112. Archived from the original on 2020-07-28.
- M'Crie, Thomas, D.D. the younger (1847). The Bass rock: Its civil and ecclesiastic history. Edinburgh: J. Greig & Son. pp. 1–12.
- Noorthouck, John (1773). "Book 1, Chapter 15: From the Fire to the death of Charles II". A New History of London: Including Westminster and Southwark. pp. 230–255.
- Raithby, John, ed. (1819). Charles II, 1670: An Act to prevent and suppress Seditious Conventicles. Statutes of the Realm (1628–80). Vol. 5. pp. 648–651.
- Shields, Alexander (1797). A hind let loose; or, An historical representation of the testimonies of the Church of Scotland, for the interest of Christ: With the true state thereof in all its periods. Glasgow: Printed by W. Paton for J. Kirk, Calton, the publisher. pp. 1–878.
- Stevenson, David (1974). Conventicles in the Kirk, 1619-37. Edinburgh: Scottish Church History Society. pp. 99–114.
- Thompson, Matthew E. (2002). "Walther's Anti-Conventicle Position: Its Roots in Pietism and Contemporary Application" (PDF). Lutheran Synod Quarterly. 42 (4): 254–291. Archived from the original (PDF) on 11 August 2017.
