= Élie Benoist =

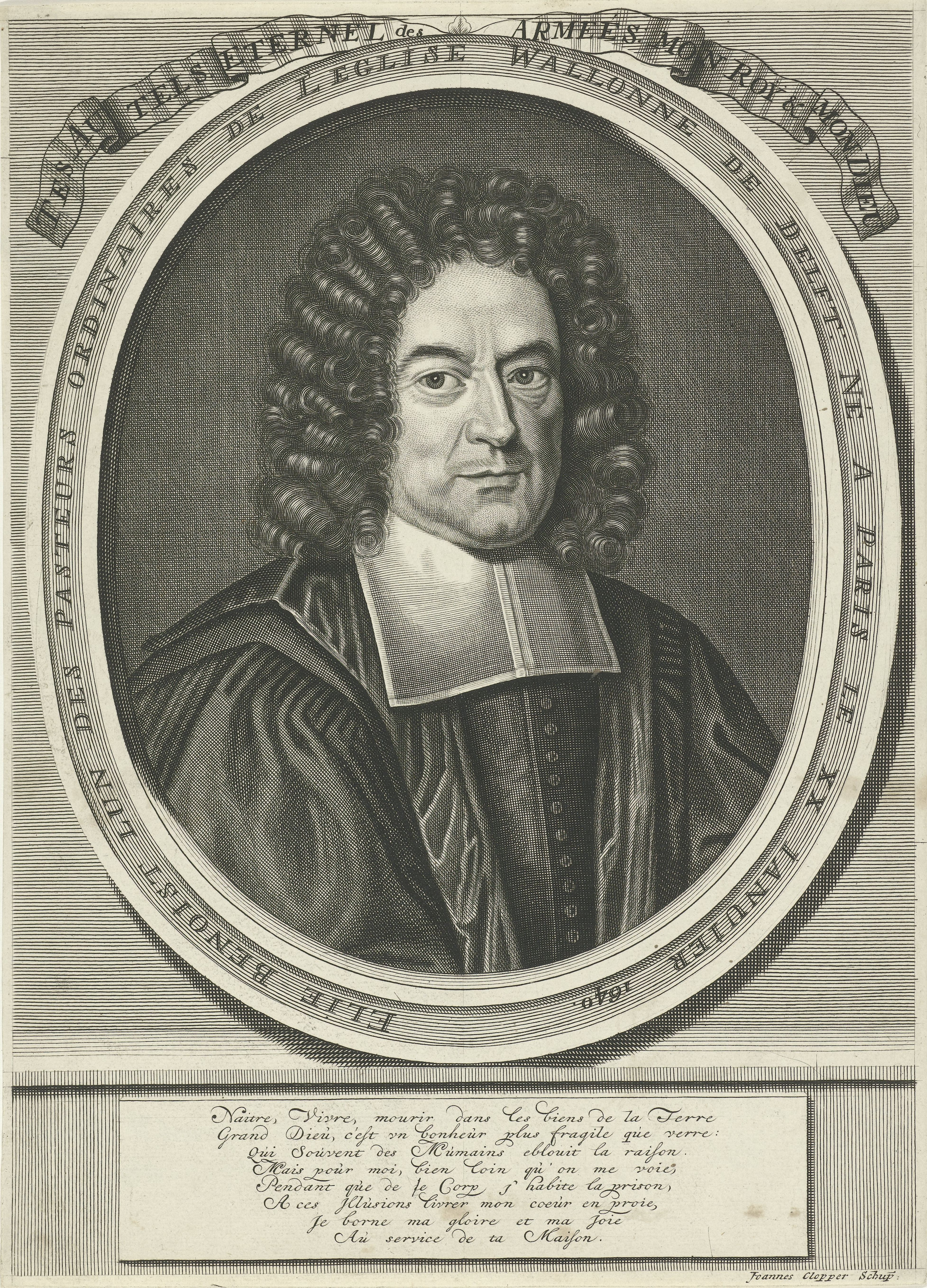
- Born: January 20, 1640; Paris
- Died: November 15, 1728 (aged 88); Delft
- Occupation: Minister
- Known for: Historian of the Edict of Nantes

Élie Benoist (20 January 1640 – 15 November 1728), was a French Protestant minister, known as a historian of the Edict of Nantes.

Benoist was born in Paris to parents who were servants of the Protestant family of La Trémoille. He displayed an early fondness for the classics, and supported himself tutoring in divinity while he studied at Montaigu College and at the Collège de La Marche (in the University of Paris) after the Huguenot college at Montauban was disbanded on protest from the Jesuits.

He was ordained in 1664 from Puylaurens. In 1665 he was called to Alençon, where the original temple of the Huguenots had been ordered demolished the previous year. He served for twenty years as Protestant minister on the outskirts of the city, with as much prudence as capacity, under the watchful eye of the authorities. He married a difficult wife. He met with much opposition from the Roman Catholics, especially from the Jesuit de la Rue, who attacked him and even incited a riot against him in August 1681.

He was already in hiding in Paris at the time of the revocation of the Edict of Nantes. Benoist immediately went to Holland, and was called as minister to the Walloon church of Delft, which worshiped in a chapel adjacent to the Prinsenhof; there he stayed thirty years, followed by an actively participating retirement. In 1687 he engaged on his massive project of the history of the Edict of Nantes, published from 1693 to 1695 and rapidly translated into English as it appeared. "To this undertaking Benoist brought the advantages of a solid education, a capacity for meticulous detail and painstaking research, integrity in the use of his sources, and a desire to be fair while acknowledging his ardent desire to vindicate his people," is the conclusion of his biographer Charles Johnston. He died, aged 88, in Delft.

== Works ==
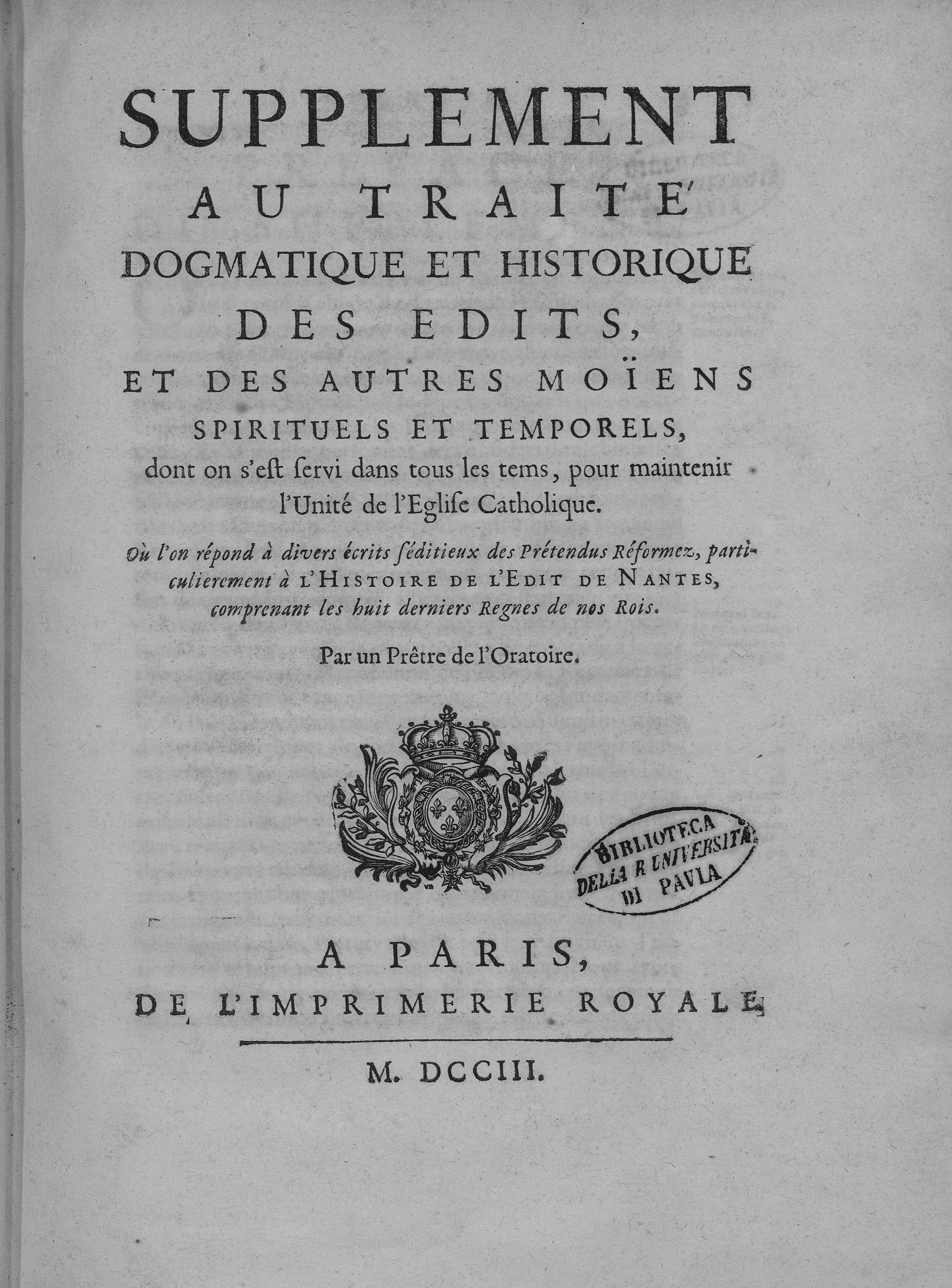
Traité dogmatique et historique, 1703

- Lettre d'un pasteur banni de son pays à une Église qui n'a раs fait son devoir dans la dernière persécution (Cologne, 1686), an open letter to his former parishioners at Alençon, exhorting those who had denied their Reformed faith under pressures of the dragonnades, and to abjure their hypocrisy.
- Histoire et apologie de la retraite des pasteurs à cause de la persécution de France (Frankfurt, 1687), a defense of the flight abroad of the pastors of Alençon, where some elders had been imprisoned.
- Élie Benoist (1693–1695). Histoire de l'édit de Nantes, contenant les choses les plus remarquables qui se sont passées en France avant et après sa publication, à l'occasion de la diversité des religions (Eng. transl., London, 1694). Delft: A. Beman.
