= Antoine Court =

French reformer

- Born: 27 March 1696
- Died: 13 June 1760 (aged 64)

Antoine Court (27 March 1696 – 13 June 1760) was a French reformer called the "Restorer of Protestantism in France." He was born in Villeneuve-de-Berg, in Languedoc, on 27 March 1696, although at least one source lists a different date. His parents were peasants, adherents of the Reformed church, which was at the time a target of state persecution following the 1685 Edict of Fontainebleau.

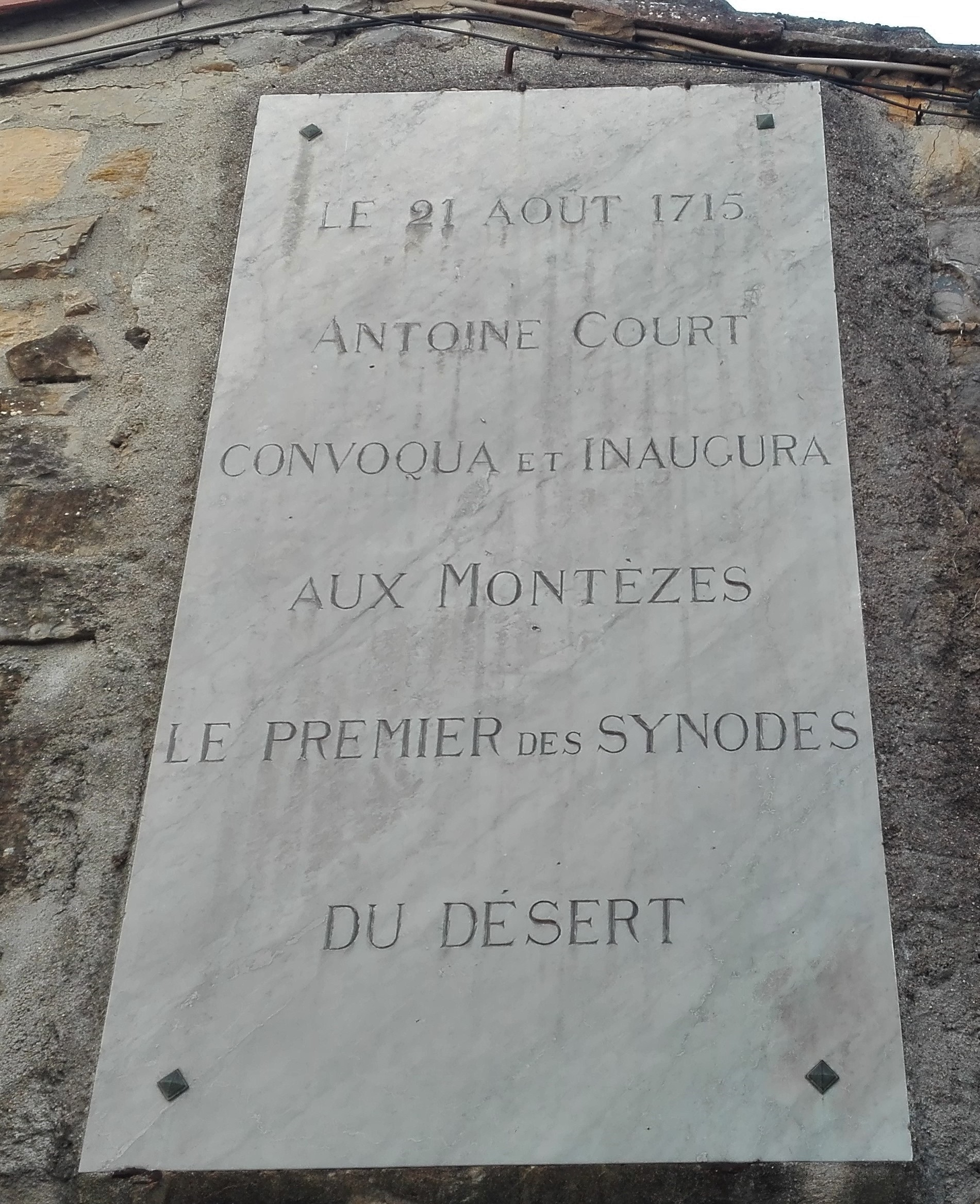
Plaque commémorative du premier synode du Désert, aux Montèzes

Antoine (sometimes translated as Anthony) was ordained by Pierre Corties at a Synod in 1718. He founded a school for clergy and encouraged Paul Rabaut to join the ministry of the church.

== Early life ==
When he was 17 years old, Court began to speak at secret meetings of the Protestants, and in 1715 he convoked the first Synod of the Desert, or synod of the French Reformed Church. He was ordained in 1718, and continued holding religious gatherings for Protestants across France.

His proposals for the improvement of the French Protestant church were:

1. regular religious meetings for teaching and worship;
2. suppression of the fanaticism of those who professed to be inspired, and of the consequent disorders;
3. restoration of discipline by the establishment of consistories, conferences, and synods;
4. the careful training of a body of pastors.
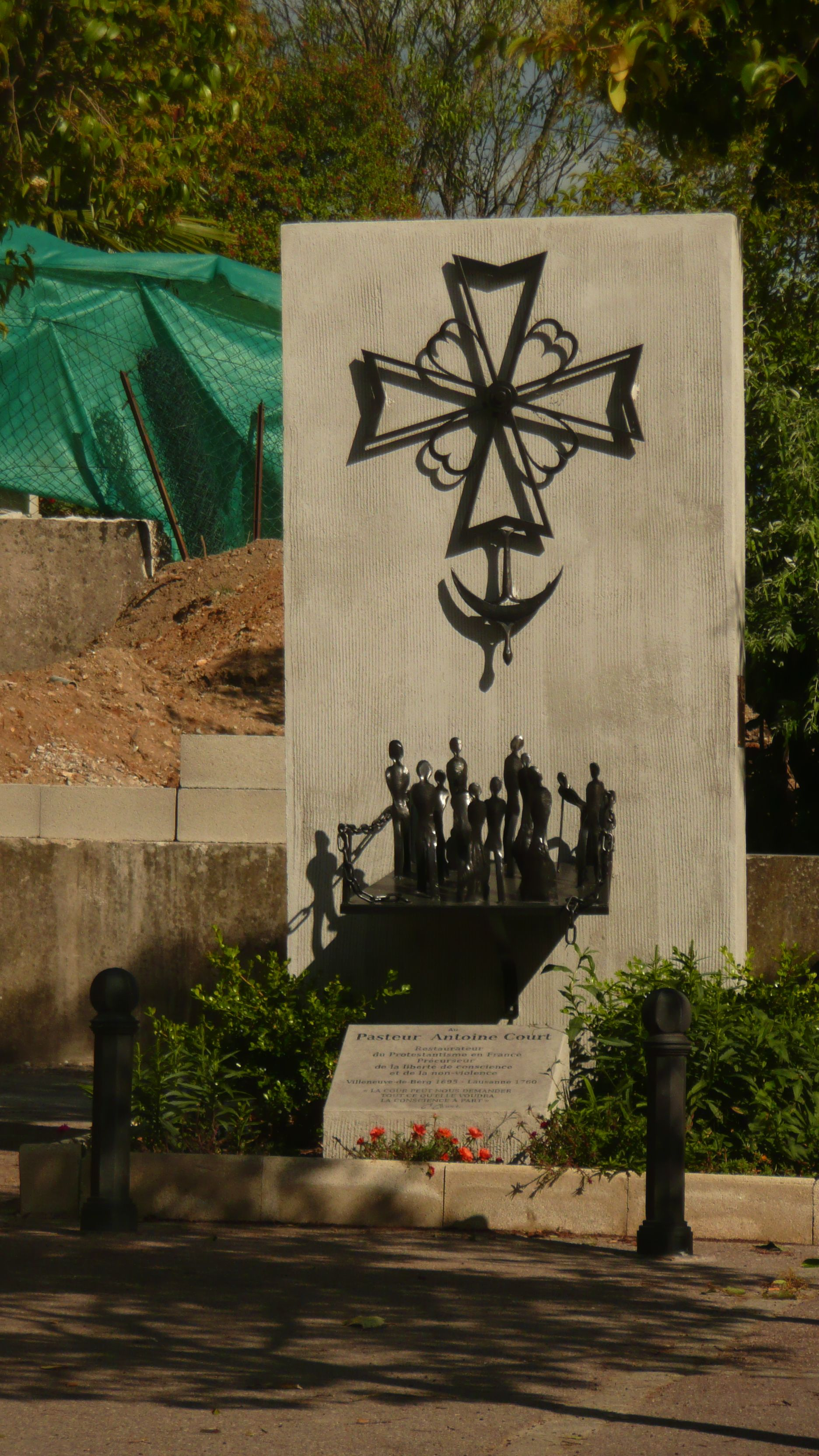
  07170 Villeneuve-de-Berg, France - panoramio (15)

== Later life ==
In 1724, France issued a decree that further criminalised Protestantism, and made preaching punishable by death. A price was set on Court's head, and in 1729 he fled to Lausanne, Switzerland, where there was a seminary for Protestant clergyman. He founded a college there for the education of the clergy, and was the chief director there until his death on 13 June 1760. This college sent forth all of the pastors of the Reformed Church of France until the close of the eighteenth century.

== Works ==
Court intended to write a history of Protestantism and made extensive collections for the purpose, but he did not live to do the work. His writings include:

- An Historical Memorial of the Most Remarkable Proceedings Against the Protestants in France from 1744-51 (English translation, London, 1832)
- Histoire des troubles des Cévennes ou de la guerre des Camisards (1760; new edition, three volumes, Alais, 1819)
- Autobiography, edited by E. Hugues (Toulouse, 1885)
- Letters, from 1739, edited by C. Dardier (Paris, 1885; 1891)

== See also ==
- E. Hugues, Antoine Court (Paris, 1872)
- E. Hugues, Les Synodes du désert (three volumes, Paris, 1885–86)
- H. M. Baird, The Huguenots and the Revocation of the Edict of Nantes (New York, 1895)
- Bulletin de la Société de l'Histoire du protestantisme français (Paris, 1893–1906)
- Marie Durand
- Pierre Durand, Huguenot
- Paul Rabaut
- Conventicle
