= Hélie =

Hélie is a masculine given name and surname. See also Helie, a feminine given name.

== Given name ==
- Hélie de Boron, self-attributed writer of the Prose Tristan, an early 13th century French epic poem
- Hélie de Bourdeilles (c. 1423–1484), French Franciscan cardinal and Archbishop of Tours
- Hélie de Noailles, 10th Duke of Noailles (born 1943), French nobleman, diplomat and trade representative
- Hélie de Saint Marc (1922–2013), senior member of the French Resistance, French Foreign Legion officer and participant in the failed putsch of the generals
- Hélias de Saint-Yrieix (died 1367), French Benedictine abbot, bishop and cardinal
- Hélie de Talleyrand-Périgord, Duke of Sagan (1859–1937), French socialite and noble
- Hélie de Talleyrand-Périgord (cardinal) (1301–1364), French cardinal

== Surname ==
- Faustin Hélie (1799–1884), French jurist and reformer of criminal law
- Louis-Pierre Hélie (born 1986), Canadian alpine and freestyle skier

== See also ==
- Élie
