= Helie =

Helie is a feminine given name borne by:

- Helie of Burgundy (c. 1080–1141), daughter of Odo I, Duke of Burgundy
- Helie Klaasse (born 1949), Dutch rower
- Helie Lee (born 1964), Korean-American writer and university lecturer

== See also ==
- Hélie, a given name and surname
