= Pierre Durand (pastor) =

French Huguenot pastor

Huguenot Cross

House of Pierre and Marie Durand

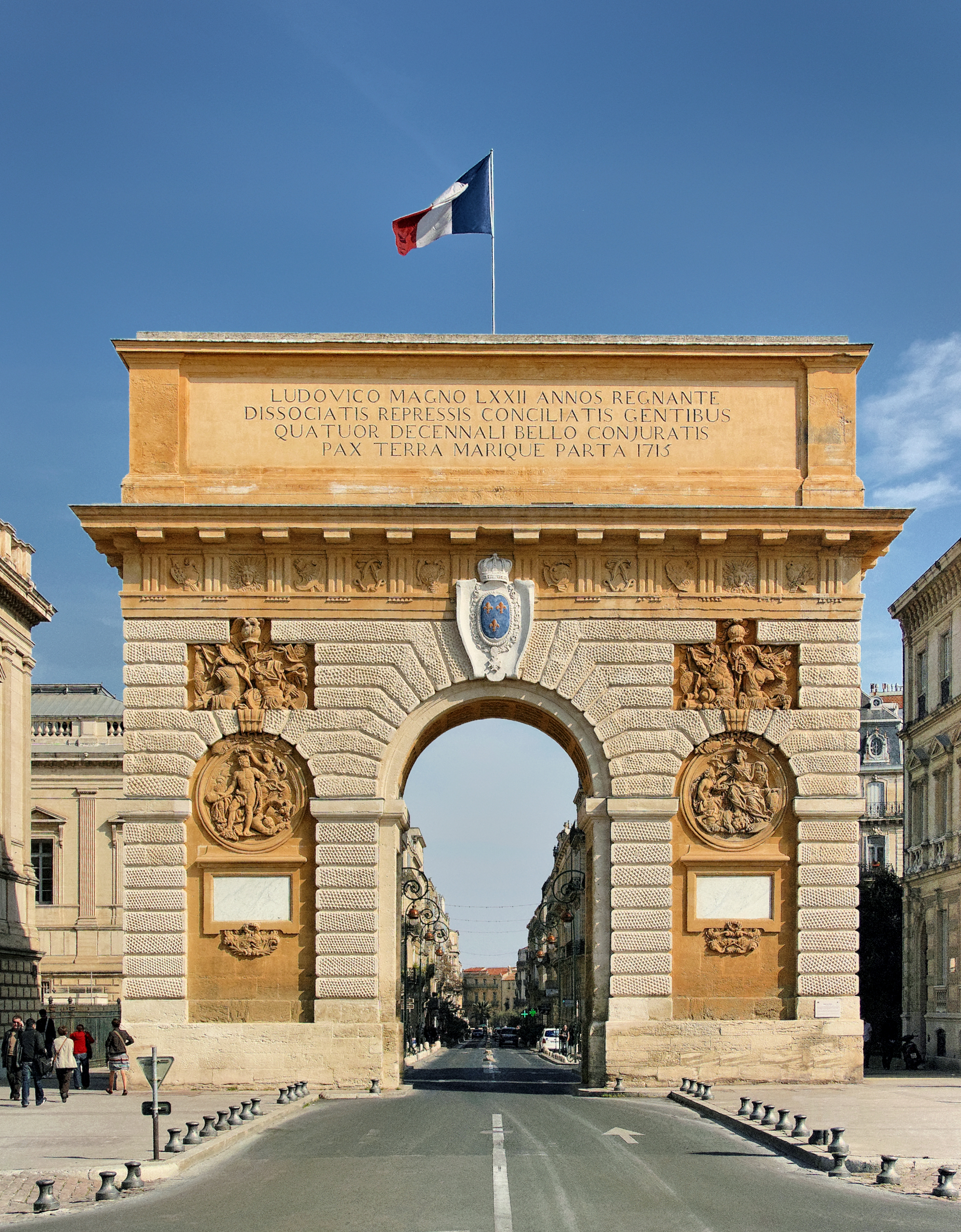
Arc triomphe de Montpellier in Porte du Peyrou. Durand is recorded as being executed at Peyrou.

Pierre Durand was a French Huguenot pastor and martyr. He was baptised a Catholic. He was the elder brother of Marie Durand. He was hanged at Montpellier on 22 April 1732.

The charge for which he was executed is recorded:

We, the intendant aforesaid, with the advice of the undersigned officers of the presidial of Montpellier, have declared, and do declare the said Pierre Durand duly attainted and convicted of having contravened the declarations of the king, and notably of the years 1686 and 1724, in taking and bearing in the kingdom the quality of minister of the pretended Reformed religion, and of having exercised its functions in the Vivarais; for reparation of which we have condemned, and do condemn, the said Pierre Durand to be hanged to a gallows raised for the purpose on the esplanade of this city, and strangled, until natural death follows therefrom.

Five priests are recorded as being at the hanging to encourage him to abjure. He refused to do so.
