= Élie Diodati =

Genevan lawyer and jurist (1567–1661)

Élie Diodati (11 May 1576 – 1661) was a lawyer and jurist from the Republic of Geneva. He is now known as a supporter of Galileo Galilei who contributed to the publication of Galileo's Two New Sciences.

== Biography ==
Diodati was born on 11 May 1576 in Geneva, Republic of Geneva, the son of Pompeo Diodati and Laura Calandrini. His parents were Italian Protestant refugees from the Republic of Lucca. Diodati studied at the universities of Basel, Heidelberg, and received a doctorate in law from the Academy of Geneva in 1596. He settled in Paris in 1602 and became an avocat in the Parlement. In Paris, Diodati was a member of the "Dupuy Cabinet", a group which brought together French and European scholars and intellectuals.

Diodati began his correspondence with Galileo Galilei in 1620 and met him in Florence in 1626. A steadfast supporter of his ideas, he arranged for Lodewijk Elzevir to visit Galileo at Arcetri, in May 1636, leading to the publication of the Two New Sciences. Diodati maintained numerous contacts with Geneva and, until 1630, served as the Republic's liaison to the French court. He was also entrusted with missions to Germany by Cardinal Richelieu. Diodati died in Paris in 1661.
