= Élie Kakou =

French actor and comedian

- Born: Alain Kakou; 12 January 1960; Nabeul, Tunisia
- Died: 10 June 1999 (aged 39); Paris, France
- Occupation: Humorist

Élie Kakou (born 12 January 1960 in Nabeul– died 10 June 1999; real name Alain Kakou) was a Tunisian-French actor and stand-up comedian.

He is known for his portrayal of the character Madame Sarfati, a parody of Sephardi Jewish mothers. He died of lung cancer at the age of 39 in Paris.

== Biography ==
Alain Kakou comes from a Sephardic Jews family. His father, Joseph, came from Algeria. He was a non-commissioned officer in the French Armed Forces. His mother, Suzy, née Valensi, comes from Nabeul and is of History of the Jews in Italy origin. His parents lived for a few more years in Nabeul, where Élie Kakou was born, before emigrating to Marseille in the Five Avenues district. He has six brothers and sisters, including Nadine, Danièle, Brigitte, Michèle and Charles.

He attended the Lycée Saint-Charles in Marseille, where he rubbed shoulders with Bruno Gilles.

Having received a Jewish education both in his family and in his youth movement,Hashomer Hatzair, he left for Israel and did his Conscription in Israel.

He took his first steps at Club Med, then on the small stage of the Marseilles restaurant-cabaret La Payotte, founded by the singer Joyeux de Cocotier and his partner Élisabeth Meissirel. At the same time, he studied Dental technician and obtained his diploma. France discovered him in 1991 in the TV show La Classe on FR3.

In 1992, he made a serious debut at the Point-Virgule theater in Paris. He had spotted its director, Marie-Caroline Burnat, two years earlierref, and took part twice in the Enfoirés evening (in 1993 and 1995), bringing to the show his humor and whimsical characters such as the Press secretary, always ready to say to the audience: “Well then... It's a comedy show: you've got to laugh.” Kakou was nominated for a Victoires de la Musique award in February 1995 in the “Best Comedian” category.

His colorful shows were great successes: Olympia (Paris), Zenith and Cirque d'hiver in Paris (the last of his career). He is best known for his main character Stereotypes of Jews, a caricature of the Tunisian Jewish mother.

Shortly before his death, he embarked on a film career, appearing in 1997 in Thomas Gilou's Would I Lie to You? (film) as Rafi Styl'mode.

== Filmography ==
- La Vérité si je mens! (1997)
- Les Kidnappeurs (1998)
- Sex, Sacrifice and Submission (1998)
- Prison à Domicile (1999)
- Monsieur Naphtali (1999)
