= Elie Bertrand =

Swiss geologist and naturalist (1713–1797)

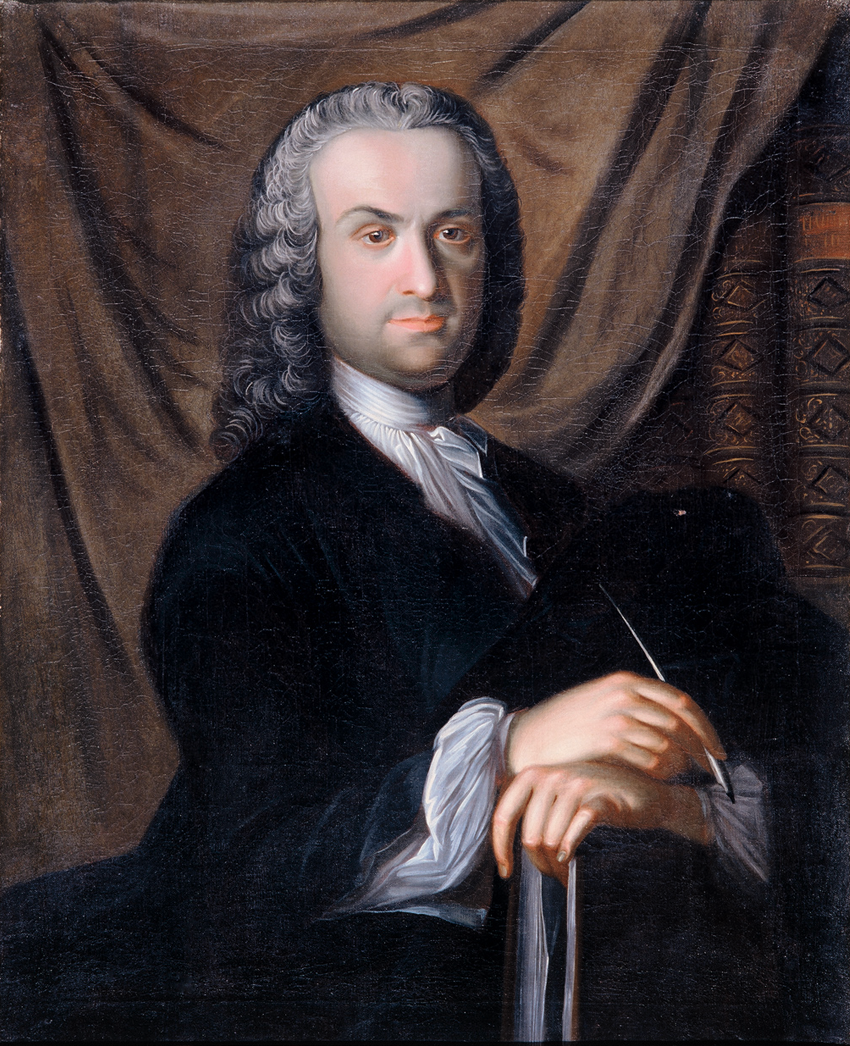
Portrait by Sigmund Barth, 1749

Elie Bertrand (17 May 1713 – 23 August 1797) was a Swiss geologist, naturalist, pastor and theologian.

== Biography ==
Bertrand was born on 17 May 1713 in Orbe, Vaud, Switzerland, as the son of Elie Bertrand, an apothecary and president of the consistory of Orbe, and Marie Faure (or Favre). He was a descendant of French Huguenots from Nyons, Dauphiné, who took refuge in Switzerland in 1684 and acquired the bourgeoisie of Orbe in 1699. His older brother, Jean Bertrand, was a pastor and agronomist.

Bertrand studied theology at Lausanne, Geneva and Leiden from 1731 to 1738. He was ordained in Lausanne in 1740 and served as pastor at Ballaigues and Orbe from 1740 to 1744. Bertrand then entered the service of the French church of Bern as a deacon in 1744, then as pastor until 1765. A close advisor to King Stanisław August Poniatowski of Poland in 1765, Bertrand directed the Department of Industry, Agriculture and Natural Sciences at Warsaw from 1765 to 1766, and was admitted to the Polish nobility in 1768.

In 1767, Bertrand returned to Switzerland, settling in Champagne near Yverdon, where he founded the city's library and economic society and devoted himself to science. His natural history cabinet was at the origin of the museum of Yverdon (Musée d'Yverdon et région). Bertrand corresponded with Voltaire, Albrecht von Haller, Linnaeus, was secretary of the Romand Economic Society of Bern, and was a member of the academies of Berlin, Göttingen, Leipzig, Basel, Stockholm, Munich, Lyon and Florence. In addition to his theological treatises, sermons, and the Recueil des ordonnances ecclésiastiques pour le Pays de Vaud (1758), Bertrand published numerous works which attest to the variety and scope of his research in philosophy, linguistics, natural history, seismology and hydrography. He died on 23 August 1797 in Yverdon, aged 84.

== Publications (selection) ==
- Mémoires sur la structure intérieure de la terre (Heidegguer, Zurich, 1752).
- Essai sur les usages des montagnes, avec une lettre sur le Nil (Heidegguer, Zurich, 1754).
- Mémoires historiques et physiques sur les tremblemens de terre (Pierre Gosse junior, La Haye, 1757).
- Recherches sur les langues anciennes et modernes de la Suisse et principalement du pays de Vaud (C. et A. Philibert, Genève, 1758).
- Dictionnaire universel des fossiles propres et des fossiles accidentels (in French). Vol. 1. Den Haag: Pierre Gosse & Daniel Pinet. 1763.
  - Dictionnaire universel des fossiles propres et des fossiles accidentels (in French). Vol. 2. Den Haag: Pierre Gosse & Daniel Pinet. 1763.
- Essai sur l'art de former l'esprit, ou Premiers élémens de la logique (G. Regnault, Lyon, 1764).
- Recueil de divers traités sur l'histoire naturelle de la terre et des fossiles (L. Chambeau, Avignon, 1766) Read online.
- Lettre à M. le Cte de Buffon... ou Critique et Nouvel essai sur la théorie générale de la terre, avec une notice du dernier discours de M. Pallas, sur la formation des montagnes, sur les changemens arrivés au globe, etc. (Besançon, 1782).
