= Élie Ehua =

French footballer (born 1992)

Personal information
- Date of birth: 16 January 1992 (age 34)
- Place of birth: Saint-Cyr-l'École, France
- Height: 1.72 m (5 ft 8 in)
- Position: Midfielder

Team information
- Current team: Angoulême

Youth career
- –2009: Angoulême

Senior career*
Years	Team	Apps	(Gls)
2009	Angoulême	10	(0)
2009–2015	Châteauroux	11	(0)
2012–2015	Châteauroux B	47	(1)
2015–2016	Fontenay-le-Comte	14	(0)
2016–2019	Romorantin	74	(0)
2019–2021	Granville	25	(0)
2021–	Angoulême	18	(1)
- * Club domestic league appearances and goals as of 01:22, 14 April 2022 (UTC)

Élie Ehua (born 16 January 1992) is a French professional footballer who plays as a midfielder for Championnat National 1 club Angoulême, of which he is the captain.

== Career ==
Ehua made his professional debut for Châteauroux on 20 May 2011, coming on as a substitute for Gauthier Pinaud in the 1–0 win over Sedan.

In June 2019, Ehua joined Granville. In 2021, he became Angoulême's first signing of the summer transfer window, returning to his former club after a twelve-year absence. He was made club captain.
