= Dragonnades =

17th century French anti-Protestant policy

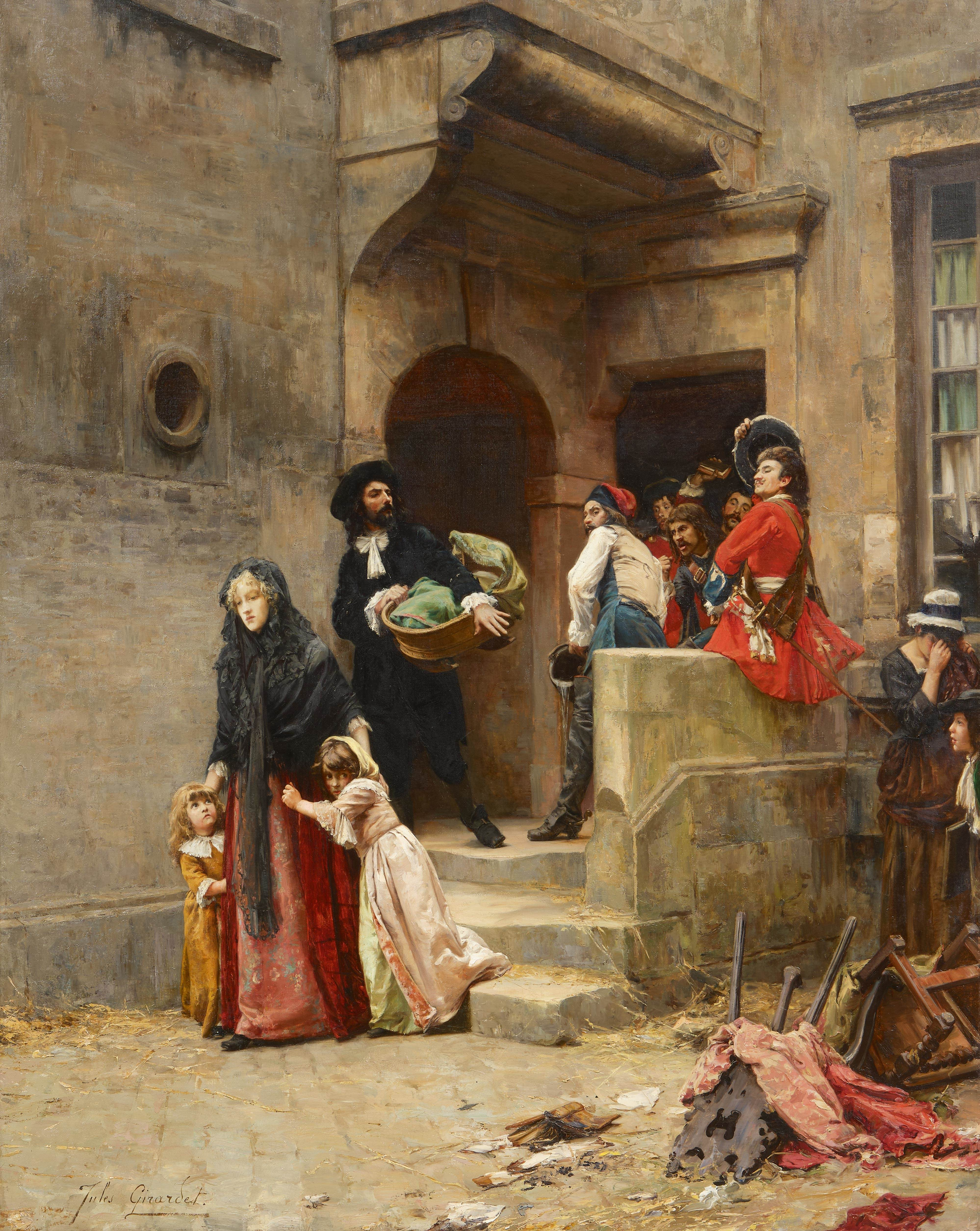
An Episode from the Dragonnades (Jules Girardet, 1886)

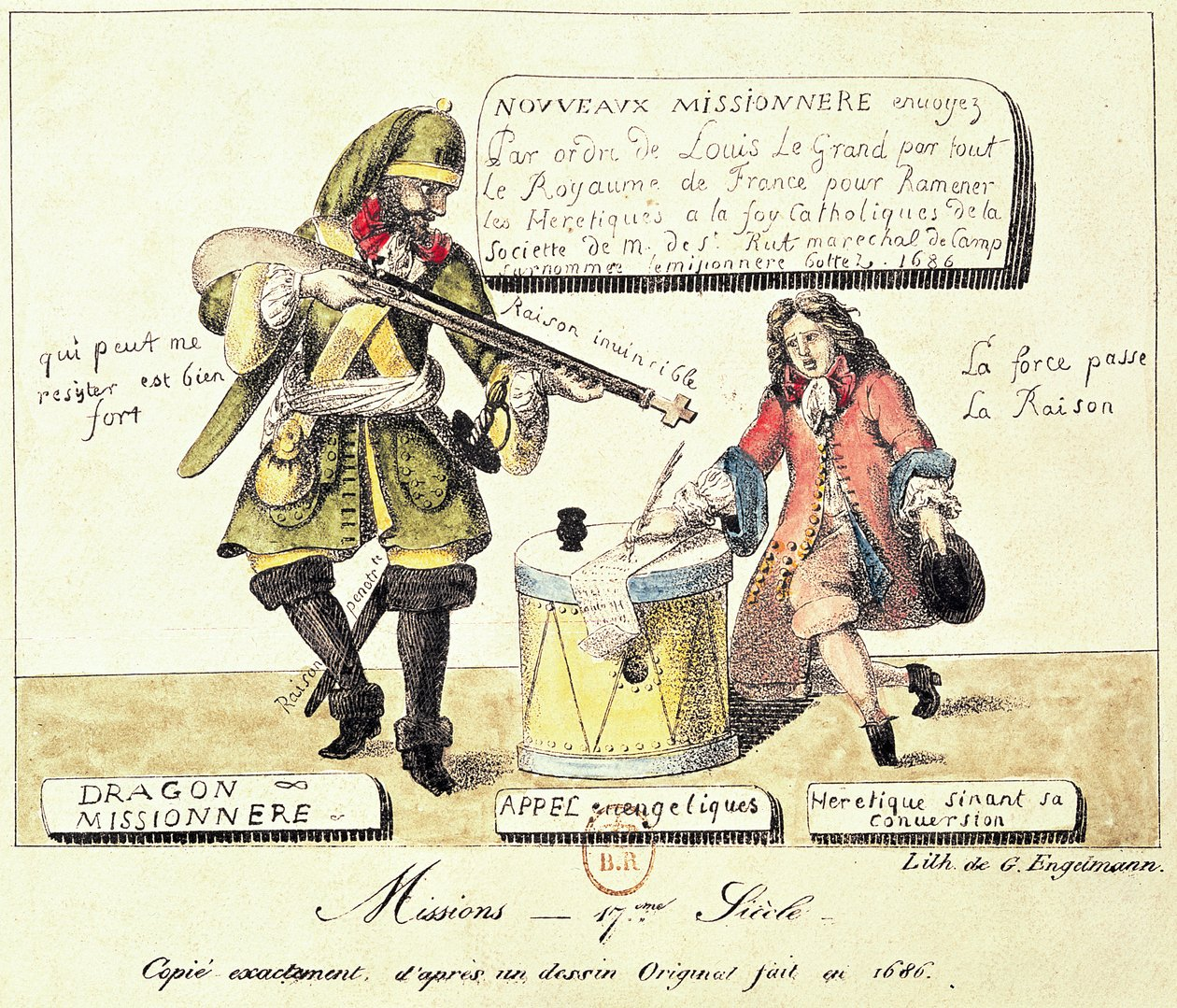
French Protestant political cartoon satirising the Dragonnades

The Dragonnades was a policy implemented by Louis XIV in 1681 to force French Protestants known as Huguenots to convert to Catholicism. It involved the billeting of dragoons of the French Royal Army in Huguenot households, with the soldiers being given implied permission to mistreat the inhabitants and damage or steal their possessions. Soldiers employed as part of this policy were derisively referred to as "missionary dragoons".

== Background ==
With the Edict of Nantes in 1598, Henry IV of France ended the French Wars of Religion by granting a relatively high degree of toleration to French Protestants (known as Huguenots) as well as political and military privileges. The latter were abolished in 1629 under the Peace of Alès following the Huguenot rebellions, but the provisions of the Edict of Nantes granting religious tolerance were largely maintained under the governments of Cardinal Richelieu and Cardinal Mazarin.

Louis XIV, however, aimed to have religious uniformity in his kingdom. Initially he offered the Huguenots financial incentives to convert, but this had limited effect. By the late 1670s he decided upon a harsher policy. He began to order the destruction of Huguenot churches and the closure of Huguenot schools.

== Implementation ==
Louis XIV combined legal persecution with a policy of terrorizing recalcitrant Huguenots who refused to convert to Catholicism by billeting both dragoons and ordinary infantrymen in their homes. The soldiers were instructed to harass and intimidate the occupants, in order to persuade them to either convert to the state religion or emigrate. As mobile mounted infantry, the 14 regiments of dragoons in the French Army of the period were sometimes used for what would now be called internal security duties, and were an effective instrument for persecuting the Huguenots.

The application of selective and coercive troop quartering had been initiated by the intendant René de Marillac in Poitou, in 1681. With the permission of the Secretary of State for War François-Michel le Tellier, Marquis de Louvois, Marillac systematically lodged troops with Protestants, in the expectation that existing laws exempting households newly converted to Catholicism from this practice would spur conversions. Billeted troops got so far out of hand that, after a series of reprimands in letters, the Marquis de Louvois was forced to recall Marillac from Poitou. (Note: This episode is recounted in L. L. Bernard, "Foucault, Louvois, and the Revocation of the Edict of Nantes", Church History 25.1 (March 1956):27-40) p. 32ff, and remarked in Catholic Encyclopedia, s.v. "Louis XIV: Louis XIV and Protestants"; Musée virtuel du protestantisme français" les dragonnades.) The Marquis himself was subsequently blamed for originating the dragonnades but research has established that responsibility rested with more junior officials such as de Marillac, ambitious for royal favour. Louvois did not oppose the policy but was concerned with the negative impact on the discipline of the soldiers involved.

== Outcome ==
The persecution of Protestants caused outrage in England and created a wave of literature in protest against the inhumane treatment of Huguenots, thousands of whom fled to England to seek asylum. The dragonnades caused Protestants to flee France, even before the Edict of Fontainebleau of 1685 revoked the religious rights granted them by the Edict of Nantes. Most Huguenot refugees sought refuge in the Old Swiss Confederacy, Dutch Republic (from where some migrated to the Dutch Cape Colony), England and the Holy Roman Empire (notably Brandenburg-Prussia). Smaller numbers also fled to New France, English North America or Scandinavia. Huguenots also fled to Colonial Brazil, where they founded the city of Saint-Louis-de-Maragnan (present-day São Luís, in the state of Maranhão), which is the only Brazilian capital founded by French-speakers. Today among the remnants of the French Huguenot colonization of the city, there is a museum dedicated to the Huguenots, and the place where the Huguenots built a fort has become the city hall, but retains its original name of La Ravardière.

On 17 January 1686, Louis XIV claimed that his policies had caused the Protestant population of France to decline from 800,000–900,000 to 1,000–1,500. Though he greatly exaggerated, their numbers did decline significantly. According to Hans J. Hillerbrand, an expert on Protestantism, Huguenot numbers had been steadily declining since the St. Bartholomew's Day massacre in 1572. The campaign ultimately proved detrimental to France's economy, as many were part of the nascent urban bourgeoisie and many others possessed skills such as silkweaving, clock-making, silversmithing, and optometry.

== See also ==
- Camisards
- French Wars of Religion
- Persecution of Huguenots under Louis XV
- Religion in France

== Bibliography ==
- Carbonnier-Burkard, Marianne; Cabanel, Patrick (1998). Une histoire des protestants en France XVIe-XXe siècle (in French). Paris: Desclée de Brouwer. ISBN 2-220-04190-5.
- Dubief, Henri; Poujol, Jacques (1992). La France protestante, Histoire et Lieux de mémoire (in French) (2nd, 2006 ed.). Montpellier: Max Chaleil éditeur. ISBN 2-84062-001-4.
