= Marie Durand =

French Protestant

Marie Durand (1711–1776), was a French Protestant. She was famously imprisoned in the Tour de Constance (Aigues-Mortes) from 25 August 1730 for attending a Huguenot assembly with her mother, or perhaps because her brother, Pierre Durand, was a well-known preacher, or perhaps because of her marriage.

== Early life ==
Marie was born to Etienne and Claudine Durand from the hamlet of Le Bouchet near Privas in France. Her older brother Pierre became well known as a Huguenot preacher and pastor. Her father Etienne who was consular registrar of the parish was arrested in February, 1729. He was jailed in Brescou at the fort where he was interned for fourteen years. Marie married a much older man who was at least in his forties, Mathieu Serres, later that same year. Her father Etienne was finally released at ninety-two years old although he only had a further two years to conclude his ruined life. Her brother was caught on the road to Vermoux in 1732 and was hanged at Montpellier in that same year.

== Imprisonment ==
The formal reason for her arrest is unclear. E Audra writes:

"It seems this marriage was not approved of by her brother, perhaps because of the great difference of age. It seems also that it was neither solemnized by a Catholic priest nor blessed by a pastor, and that the couple, after having signed a marriage contract, which was duly registered, lived as husband and wife. Perhaps for that reason alone, perhaps because she was suspected of having been married by Pierre Durand, lastly perhaps because she was the sister of a pastor wanted as a rebel to the King's Will, she was imprisoned in the Tower of Constance, at Aigues-Mortes, in 1730, while Mathieu Serres joined his father-in-law in the fort of Brescou. Anyhow, she continued to be called and to call herself not Marie Serres, but Marie Durand."

Marie was not released until 1768, 36 years later after serving 38 years in the tower. Like Margaret Wilson simple abjuration was all she needed for release but this offer she refused. The word "RESISTER" scratched by her, or by one or others of her cellmates with a knitting needle into the stonework serves as an expression of her Protestant faith. She did not convert to Roman Catholicism. It has been argued that the authorities didn't attempt to convert her once she was imprisoned as she was allowed to correspond with her pastor. It is also recorded that she was asked every day whether she would abjure but daily refused.

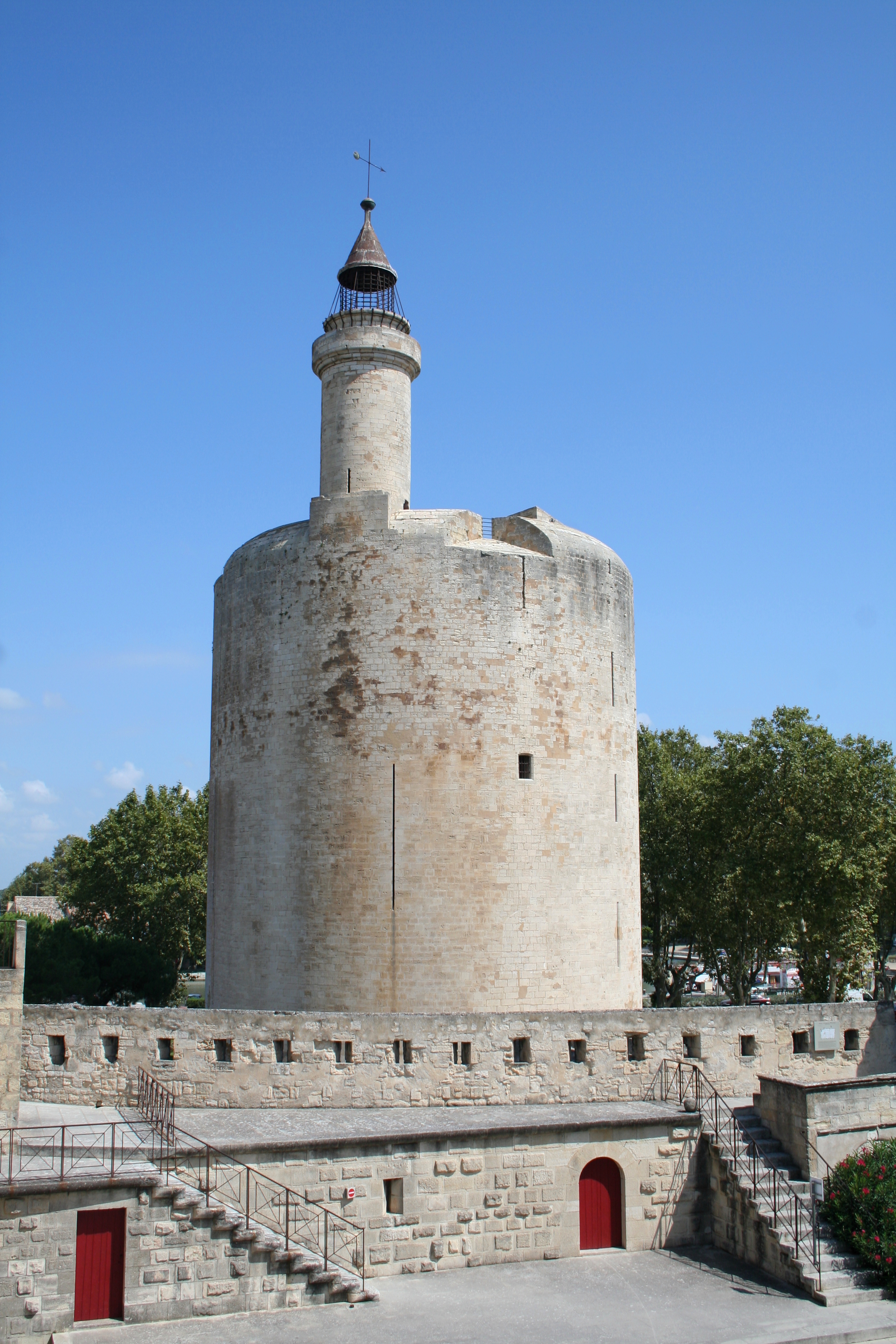
The Tower of Constance

Huguenot Cross

House of Pierre and Marie Durand

== Letters ==
The forty-eight surviving letters written by Marie Durand have been published in French by Etienne Gamonnet. These include letters to her niece, Anne in Geneva who, "who, in the end, recanted in order to marry a rich catholic many years her senior." She also wrote, in 1740, on behalf of other prisoners like the nine women from Vivarais complaining that ‘ During the ten years we have been here, nothing has ever been sent to us from Vivarais.’ She added: ‘Charity is the true principle of our religion, and they ’ — meaning the people in Vivarais — ‘ do not profess it.’ She also wrote to Paul Rabaut, a Huguenot pastor in Nîmes who looked after the prisoners. Jean Louis Bridel quotes some sections of her letters to her pastor for example:

"Sir, very dear and much honoured Pastor, it is to you we have re-course; it is to your pastoral kindness I apply for a remedy to prevent an infection which is likely to spread among us... In the name of the divine mercy, use every possible effort to rescue us from our frightful sepulchre. We are in urgent need of all the help you can give... May God bless you, worthy Sir, and your amiable family; may He protect you all and accomplish by your beloved hands the great work of His most desired peace, and grant me the blessing of the sweetest satisfaction I desire in this world, next to the peace of the church, the great pleasure of seeing you. My most respectful salutations to all who are dear to you; may you and the talent you have received from Heaven live again in them for ever. Burn my letter if you please. Have the goodness to pray for us, particularly for our sick; the health of nearly all of us is much affected."

The letters of Marie Durand were first translated into English by Campbell Markham and are found in his biography and translation work Marie Durand: Prisoner of the Tour de Constance, 1730 to 1768 - Her Life and Letters.

== Release, death and legacy ==
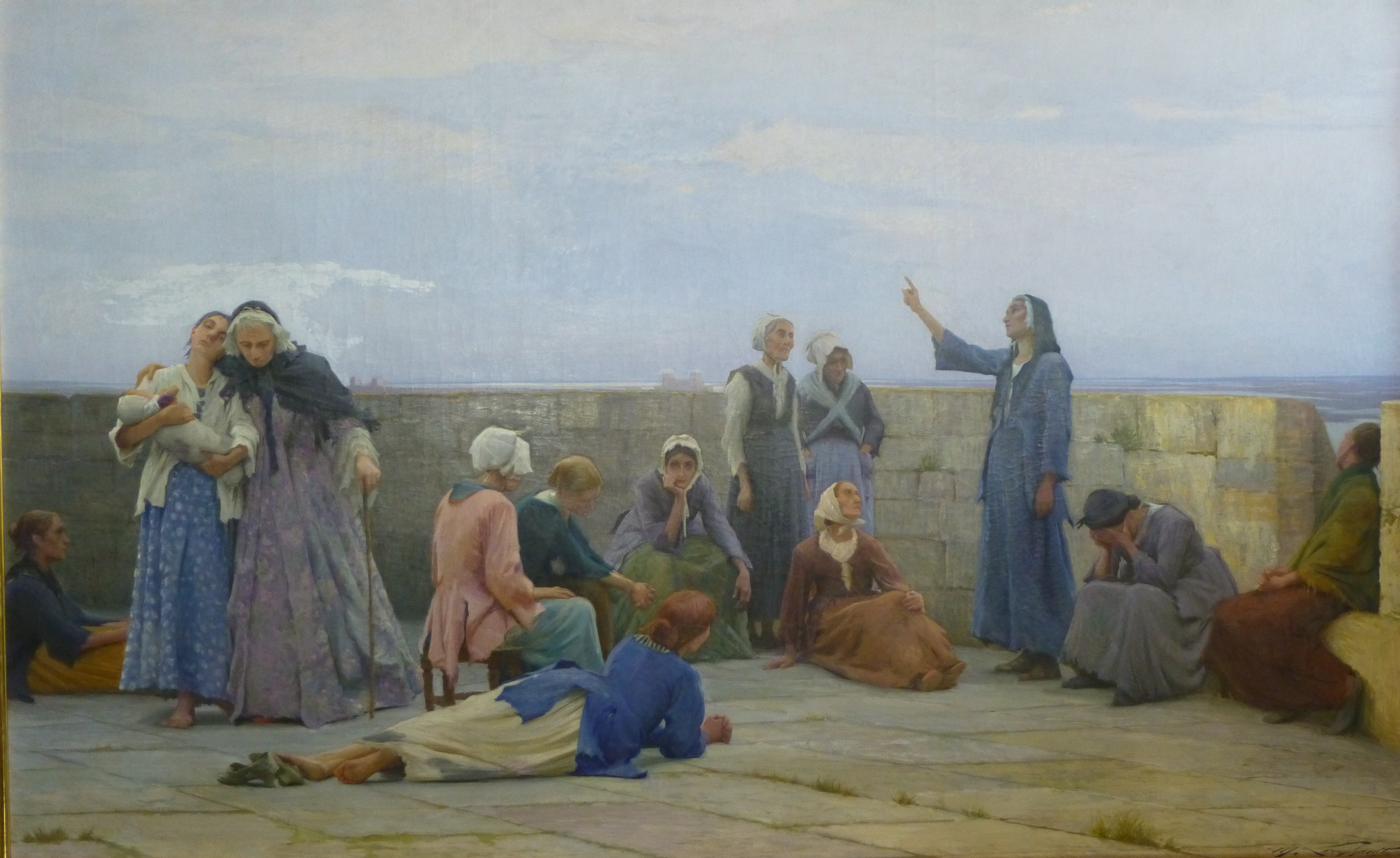
Prisonnières huguenotes à la Tour de Constance

Marie Durand was released on 14 April 1768; she returned to her childhood home. Charles Tyler relates:

"The Walloon Church of Amsterdam allowed Marie a pension of 200 livres, which she generously shared with a neighbour, Alexandre Chambon, who had returned from the galleys of Toulon at the age of seventy-three. Marie died in September, 1776."
Marie Durand died in her birthplace in Bouschet-de-Pranles at the beginning of July 1776, prematurely aged by captivity.

== Recent Scholarship ==
In 2022 Australian historian Campbell Markham translated Marie Durand's surviving letters and published the first scholarly biography of Durand in the English language. He also surveyed the memorialisation of Marie Durand and analysed what her letters say about suffering, charity, civil government, and freedom of conscience. Markham's work was published in 2026 by Wipf and Stock.

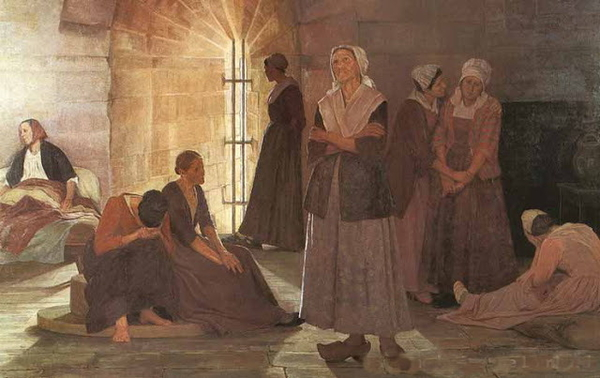
Prisonnières huguenotes à la Tour de Constance, par Jeanne Lombard
