= Paul Rabaut =

French pastor

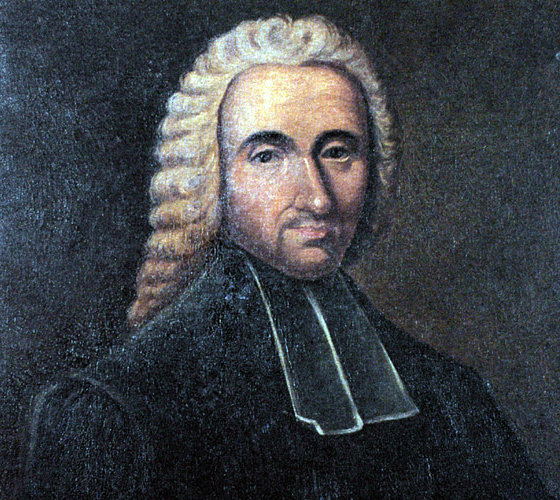
Paul Rabaut

Paul Rabaut (29 January 1718 – 25 September 1794) was a French pastor of the Huguenot "Church of the Desert". He was regarded by many as the leader and director of the proscribed church. He was a peacemaker and a scholar despite, due to persecution, living like a troglodyte for more than 30 years.

== Biography ==
He was born at Bédarieux, Hérault. His father was a draper. In 1738 he was admitted as a preacher by the synod of Languedoc, and in 1740 he went to Lausanne to complete his studies in the seminary founded by Antoine Court. In 1741 Rabaut was placed at the head of the church of Nîmes, and in 1744 he was vice-president of the general synod. During the persecution of 1745–1752, he was forced into hiding. When the marquis of Paulmy d'Argenson was sent to Languedoc to make a military inspection in 1750, Rabaut succeeded in interviewing him while he was changing his horses.

For a time the persecution ceased, but it broke out again in 1753, and a price was put on Rabaut's head. Louis François de Bourbon, prince de Conti, interested himself in the Protestants in 1755, and in July Rabaut visited him. During the years 1755-1760 periods of persecution and toleration alternated. By 1760, however, the efforts of Antoine Court and Paul Rabaut had been so successful that French Protestantism was well established and organized. In 1762 in a time of relative peace two sites at which Rabaut preached are recorded:

At last, in 1762, he obtained a sort of tacit tolerance from the Prince of Beauveau. The Protestants of Nismes then chose for their winter meetings a vast amphitheatre situated on the road to Alais, on the banks of the torrent of Cadereau, and which they called the Hermitage. There, upon seats constructed with loose stones, assembled, every Sunday, six or eight thousand persons, eager to hear the inspired words of their pastor. In summer they transferred their meetings to an old quarry, named Lecque, surrounded on all sides by immense rocks, and to be reached only by two narrow paths. The burning beams of the sun were excluded from it, and the faithful found themselves sheltered from heat and rain. It was in this sombre cavern that, for more than twenty years, Rabaut's voice resounded, preserving faith and hope in his hearers' hearts.

Court de Gébelin, Rabaut himself, and his son Jean-Paul Rabaut Saint-Etienne now exerted themselves to get it recognized by the law and government. When the people revolted, the minister Turgot in 1775 requested Rabaut to calm them.

His success aroused the jealousy of his colleagues, who tried to undo the good work started by Antoine Court. Rabaut persevered in his efforts to improve the legal position of the Protestants. In 1785, when he was visited by the Marquis de la Fayette, it was arranged that Rabaut's son, Rabaut Saint-Etienne, should go to Paris on behalf of the Reformed Church.

In November 1787 King Louis XVI's edict of toleration was signed, though it was not registered until 29 January 1788. Two years later liberty of conscience was proclaimed by the National Assembly, of which Rabaut Saint-Etienne was vice-president, and it was declared that non-Catholics might be admitted to all positions. After the fall of the Girondists, however, in which Rabaut Saint-Etienne was involved, Paul Rabaut, who had refused to renounce his title of pastor, was arrested, dragged to the citadel of Nîmes, and kept in prison seven weeks (1794). He died at Nîmes, soon after his release.

See J Pons do Nîmes, Notice biographique sur Paul Rabaut (1808); Charles Dardier, Paul Rabaut, ses lettres à Antoine Court (1884) and Paul Rabaut, ses lettres à divers (1891).

== See also ==
- Marie Durand
- Conventicles
