= Élie Dohin =

French footballer (born 1983)

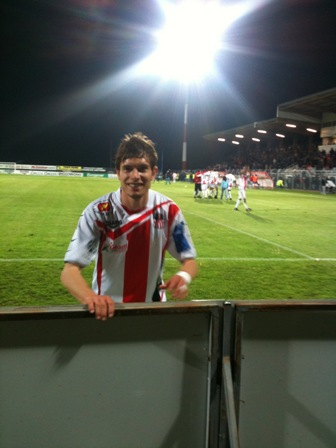

Personal information
- Full name: Élie Dohin
- Date of birth: 29 July 1983 (age 43)
- Place of birth: Orléans, France
- Height: 1.71 m (5 ft 7 in)
- Position: Midfielder

Senior career*
Years	Team	Apps	(Gls)
2002–2004	Chamois Niortais	0	(0)
2004–2005	Orléans	32	(2)
2005–2008	Libourne	69	(10)
2008–2010	Ajaccio	66	(2)
2010–2012	Châteauroux	26	(0)
2012–2013	Boulogne	6	(0)
2013–	Lège Cap-Ferret		
- * Club domestic league appearances and goals as of 29 March 2014

Élie Dohin (born 29 July 1983) is a French football midfielder.
