= Diment =

Diment is a surname.

Notable people with this surname include:

- Adam Diment (born 1943), Spy novelist
- Jack Diment (died 1978), Scottish footballer
- Judith Diment, British advocate for polio eradication
- Rob Diment, English singer-songwriter
- Tony Diment (1927–2005), English cricketer

Notable families with this surname include:

- Diment Family (South Australia), Australian educationalists
