= Academy of Architecture Library =

Coordinates: 45.8675°N 8.9833°E

Academy of architecture Library
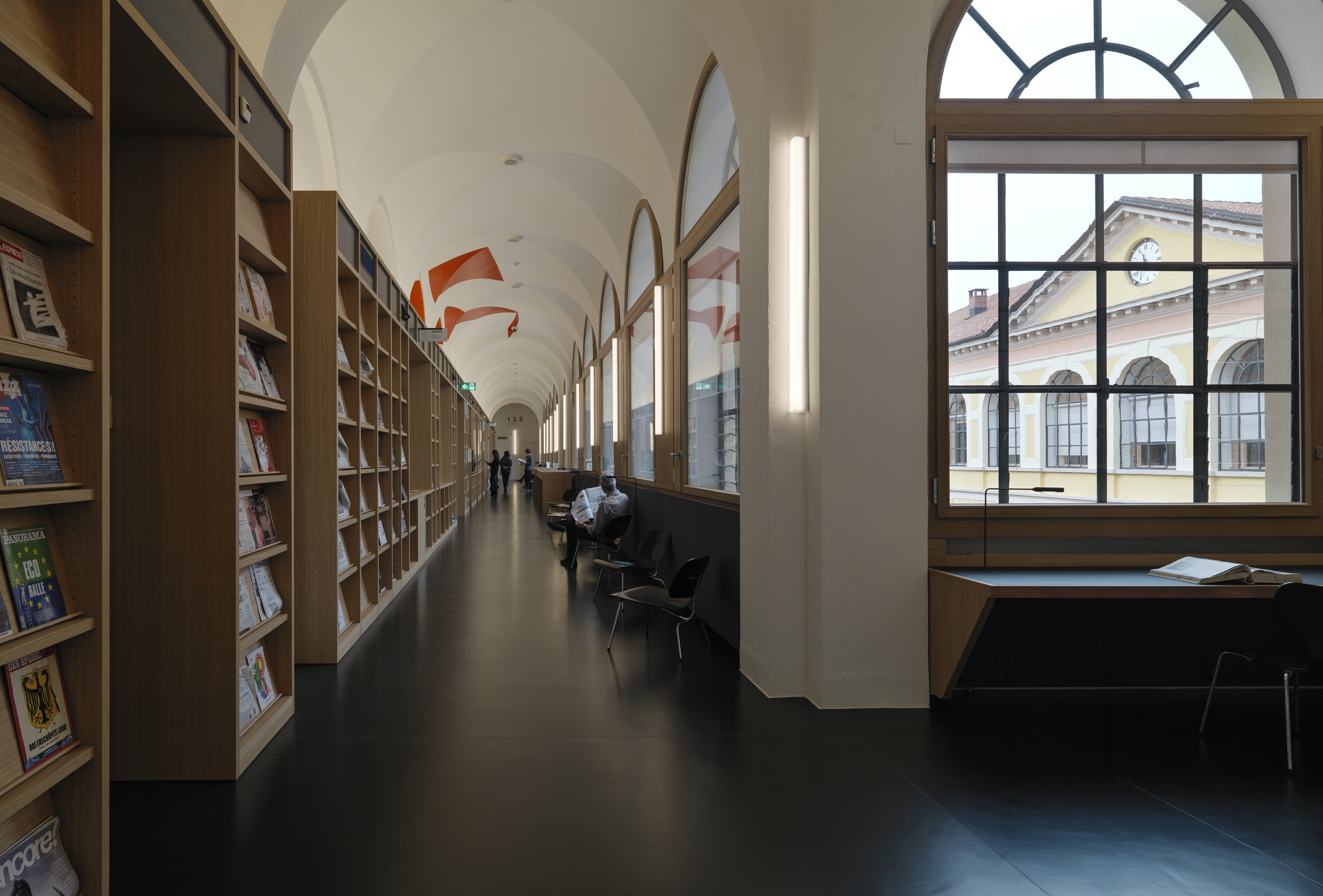
- Loggias of Academy of architecture Library
- Location: via Turconi 25, 6850 Mendrisio, Switzerland
- Type: Academic library
- Established: 1996 (30 years ago)

Collection
- Items collected: Books, journals, newspapers, magazines, databases, maps, stamps, prints, drawings and manuscripts, photographs and archives

Other information
- Director: Angela Windholz
- Website: biblio.arc.usi.ch/en/index.php

The Academy of Architecture Library is the research library of the Accademia di Architettura in Mendrisio, which is part of the Università della Svizzera italiana. The library is a major scholarly resource for members of the Academy of Architecture of Mendrisio and external researchers. The library's collection is focused on the history of architecture, visual culture and the arts in general, including design, photography, restoration, urban, territorial and landscape design planning. The general collection is in open-stacks, as author's libraries and a vast collection of specialized magazines; while the ancient volumes, the graphic and photographic collections are preserved in air-conditioned rooms.

== Access ==
The library is open (and free) to all members of the Università della Svizzera italiana, and to students and academics from other institutions, but also a generalistic public is welcome. In 2020 it became member of Swiss Library Service Platform (SLSP) a service provider which includes more than 500 Swiss libraries. Since 2011 it has been a member of the Art Discovery Group Catalogue, an international catalogue of art history and architecture that combines the international book heritage of museums and libraries of art and architecture.

== History ==
The library was opened, together with the school, in 1996. It was located on the ground floor of Villa Argentina and in 2003 moved in the building created as a multipurpose classroom by Mario Botta and Aurelio Galfetti, built in 1996-1997. In 2020, Palazzo Turconi was renovated to house the library on the first floor.

== Digitisation project ==
In May 2020, Academy of architecture Library announced that a new project funded by Memoriav allow them to start digitising some of its photographic collections and eventually provide access to them free of charge over the Internet via the Iconoteca website. Initially the project will focus on two photographic collections "Luigi Zaretti Collection" and "André Corboz Collection", but soon extended to other photographic and graphic documents.

== Special collections ==
As part of its collection of more than 260,000 volumes, the library contains printed books from earlier times, archival and photographic collections, and personal fonds. This includes:

- Fondo L’Archivolto; The L'Archivolto was a library and a space for cultural exchanges based on the common interest in architecture.
- Fondo Jean-François Bergier. Jean-François Bergier (Lausanne 1931 - Blonay 2009);
- Fondo André Corboz. The personal fonds of André Corboz (Ginevra 1928 - Ginevra 2012), a Swiss historian and theorist of architecture and the city who has produced innovative and original studies on architecture, historical heritage, urban planning and morphology and development of territories and human settlements. An eclectic figure, André Corboz was a poet, jurist, erudite researcher, photographer and bibliophile.
- Fondo Jacques Gubler. Jacques Gubler (Nyon 1941 - ) is an architectural theorist and historian;
- Fondo Augusto Guidini padre e figlio. The personal fonds of Augusto Guidini Sr. and Jr. includes the library of the eclectic architect, politician and writer Augusto Guidini (1853-1928)
- Fondo Martin Kunz. Martin Kunz (Basilea, 6 ottobre 1947 – Lugano, 25 ottobre 2021) was a Swiss art historian and museum curator.
- Fondo Augusto Rima Augusto Rima (Mosogno 1916 - Locarno 2003) was a Swiss eingeneer and polyhistor;
- Fondo Stanislaus von Moos. Stanislaus von Moos (Lucerna 1940 - ) is an art historian and architectural theorist;
- Fondo Luigi Zaretti. Luigi Zaretti was the technical director (from 1957 to 1963) of the Milan Metropolitan project;
- Fondo IN.CO. S.p.A. e Silvano Zorzi; photo collection of the Italian engineering firm hold in the Academy of architecture Library and digitised by Iconoteca;
- Fondo Fernando Astete. Iconoteca host a collection of colour slides, made by Fernando Astete, an anthropologist and keeper of Machu Picchu archaeological site in Perù.

== Bibliography ==
- Windholz, A. (2018) La Biblioteca dell'Accademia di architettura, in: "Archi", no. 1, pp. 8–9
- Windholz, A. Da ospedale a biblioteca: la storia del legato Turconi. Mendrisio: Mendrisio Academy Press, 2021
