= James Squair =

British association football player

Personal information
- Date of birth: 28 September 1884
- Place of birth: Edinburgh
- Position: Forward

Senior career*
Years	Team	Apps	(Gls)
1904	Newcastle United	?	(?)
1905–1907	Juventus	9	(1)
1908	Torino	0	(0)
Total		≥9	(≥1)
- * Club domestic league appearances and goals

James Squair (28 September 1884 – 1910) was a Scottish Association footballer. He played as forward.

== Early years ==
Squair was born and lived his earliest years in Edinburgh. His mother died when he was around 3 years old. When aged around 8, he moved briefly to London where his father re-married. He then moved to Newcastle on Tyne where he schooled. He then started a career as a shipbroker's clerk there. He played for a minor cricket club.

In Newcastle he met Jack Diment as both embarked on a career in shipping. Some records claim they were on the books at Newcastle United. That is disputed though with at least one online article claiming it is incorrect that they played for Newcastle United (since they were never on the club's books and their names do not appear in any contemporary British football records).

Squair (aged 19) and Diment (aged 20), both joined the staff of Walter F Becker, a well connected steamship owner. Becker had interests in several Italian ports, and whose company Navigazione Alta Italia ran the Creole Line. Becker is also reported as a football aficionado, having in 1901 founded a club in Messina. Squair and Diment were sent to Turin in the autumn of 1904.

== Career in Italy ==
They both debuted for Juventus on 13 November 1904 playing for the Palla Dapples trophy, a trophy donated by Henri Dapples for a series challenge matches. They lost 1-0 at Genoa CFC. Squair has been described as a fair-haired, quick and creative inside left who chipped in with the occasional goal.

His debut for Juve was on 12 March 1905 in the Italian championship, was in a 1–1 away draw again at Genoa. In his first season at Juventus, they won the Prima Categoria, a predecessor tournament of the 1929 formed Serie A. This was also prior to the Scudetto being awarded to the Italian league champions from 1924. 1905 is though recognised as the first national league title won by Juve. Juve came close to retaining the title in 1906. However, after a play-off versus Milan was drawn, Juve refused to replay, protesting that the replay was arranged in their opponents' city. Milan were thus awarded the title.

His last match for the Juventus came on 13 January 1907 in a 2–1 away loss at Torino. That was the first ever Derby della Mole. He made nine appearances in the competition for the Italian league title in which he scored one goal for Juventus. He also played in 10 other Juventus games such as friendlies, scoring a further goal.

In 1908, he played for Torino. However, that was the 1st of two years in which the FIF banned non-Italians from playing in Italian championship matches.

Squair then relocated to Naples, appointed local manager for Peirce Brothers, an off-shoot of Becker's shipping agency. His football career ended at this point.

== Personal life and death ==
Squair was followed to Naples by Mabel Stroud, the daughter of an English lace manufacturer who was based in Turin. Squair married Mabel at the British Consulate in March 1909. In November they had a daughter named Emily. Five days after Emily's birth though, he died on St Andrews Day, 30 November 1909. His death certificate does not state the cause. He was 25.

Diment married and fathered a daughter named Ruby with Mabel's sister, Olga. Diment and Olga later divorced.

== Honours ==
=== Juventus ===
- Prima Categoria: 1905
