= Pro Helvetia =

Swiss cultural foundation (1939–)

- Founded: 1939; 87 years ago
- Founder: Government of Switzerland
- Type: Cultural institution
- Region served: Worldwide
- Product: Swiss cultural education

The foundation Pro Helvetia is a public foundation of Switzerland, which supports artists, promotes Swiss culture and art abroad. It is responsible for major international cultural event exhibitions. The foundation promotes cultural dialogue of the different regions of the country and supports arts in interregional context.

== History and legal foundations ==
Pro Helvetia was founded by decision of the Federal Council on October 20, 1939, as an organization to support the spiritual national defence. In 1949, it was transformed into a foundation under public law.

According to the Federal Law Regarding the Foundation «Pro Helvetia» of December 17, 1965, the foundation's activities encompassed the following areas:

- Preservation and protection of the cultural identity of the country
- Promotion of cultural activities, based on the specific conditions in cantons, linguistic regions and cultural communities
- Promotion of cultural exchange between linguistic regions and cultural communities in Switzerland
- Fostering cultural relations with foreign countries

The Pro Helvetia Act of 1965 was partially revised in 1970 and 1980. It was replaced by the Cultural Promotion Act (German: Kulturförderungsgesetz) with effect from January 1, 2012, which defines Pro Helvetia's mandate as follows: «The foundation fosters the diversity of artistic creation, promotes Swiss art and culture, supports popular culture and facilitates cultural exchange.» This mandate is detailed in the Cultural Dispatch (German: Kulturbotschaft), which defines the priorities for cultural promotion at a federal level for four years at a time.

Federal funding for the foundation was initially regulated by the Pro Helvetia Act and amounted to CHF 3.0 million per year from 1966 and CHF 5.0 million from 1971. Since the partial revision of the act in 1980, the Swiss Confederation has financed Pro Helvetia through credit decisions, each of which extends over four years and is based on a program approved by the foundation council.

== Fields of activity ==
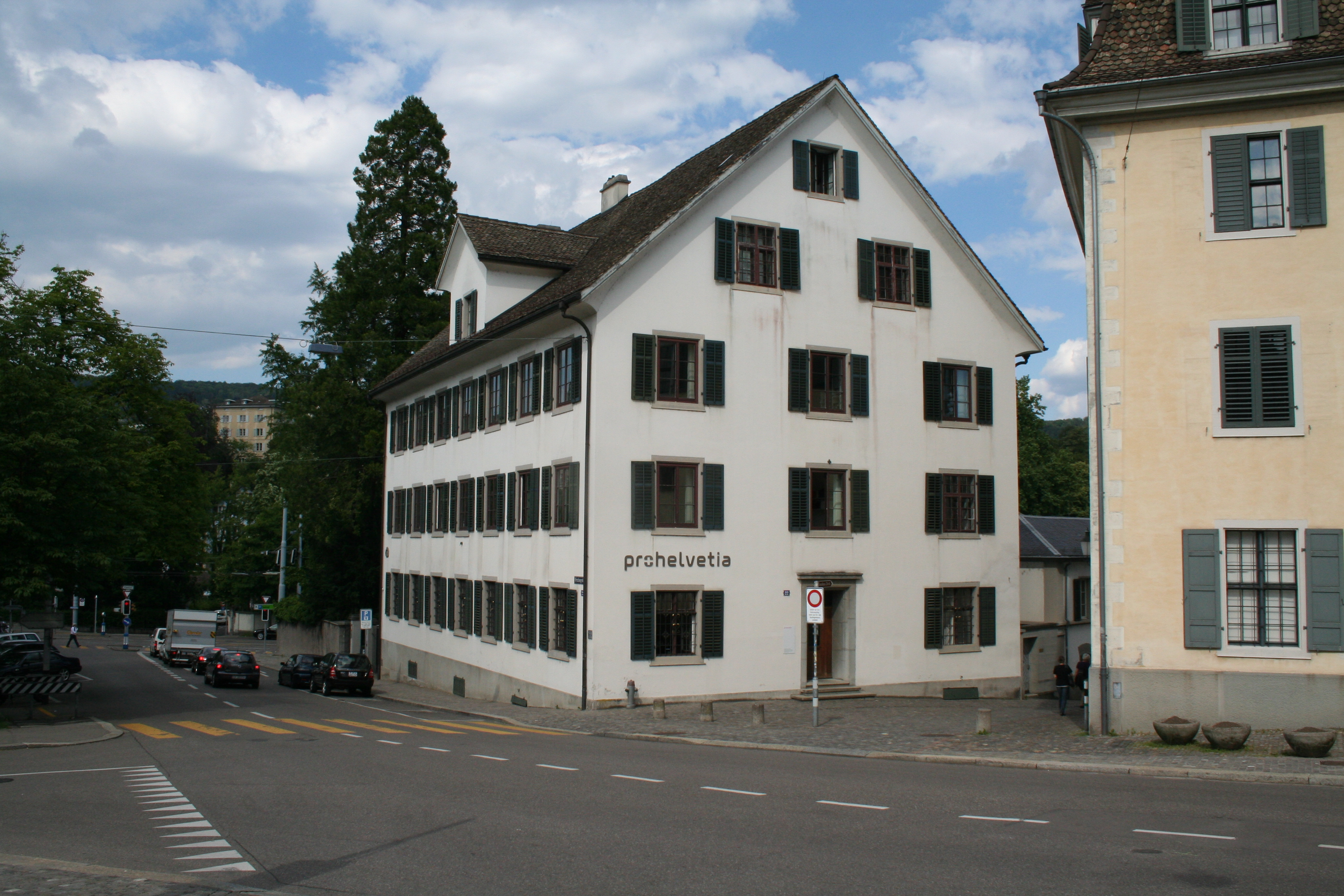
Haus zum Lindengarten, head office of Pro Helvetia at Hirschengraben in Zurich

According to the Cultural Dispatch 2025-2028, Pro Helvetia's mandate includes the following activities:

- Support of artistic creation through work grants in the fields of performing arts, design, literature, music, visual arts
- Promotion of cultural exchange between the linguistic and cultural communities of Switzerland through funding for visiting performances, public readings, concert series, exhibitions, festivals, translations or events of contemporary popular culture
- Promotion of Swiss culture abroad by supporting public reading trips, tours, exhibitions and translations as well as by financing national appearances at major cultural events
- Creating new cultural stimuli through its own programs or by promoting third-party projects
- Support for young talents (residency and coaching programs, facilitation of appearances, networking opportunities)

Except for film, Pro Helvetia is engaged in all areas of the arts: Performing arts, design, literature, music and visual arts. It supports projects in innovative popular culture through a mandate to the IG Volkskultur. The promotion of Swiss filmmaking was handed over from Pro Helvetia to the Swiss Films foundation as of January 1, 2004.

In 2024, Pro Helvetia received and reviewed 7,046 applications from third parties and responded positively to 35.8 percent of them. The performing arts, design including game design, literature, music and visual arts were supported. 87.0 percent of the CHF 45.7 million that Pro Helvetia spent in 2024 went directly to cultural activities. The administrative costs accounted for 13.0 percent.

== Presidents ==
- 1939–1943 Heinrich Häberlin
- 1944–1952 Paul Lachenal
- 1952–1964 Jean-Rodolphe de Salis
- 1965–1970 Michael Stettler
- 1971–1977 Willy Spühler
- 1978–1985 Roland Ruffieux
- 1986–1989 Sigmund Widmer
- 1990–1998 Rosemarie Simmen
- 1998–2005 Yvette Jaggi
- 2006–2013 Mario Annoni
- 2014–2023 Charles Beer
- Since 2024 Michael Brändle

== Directors ==
- 1939–1959 Karl Naef
- 1959–1991 Luc Boissonnas
- 1992–1997 Urs Frauchiger
- 1997–1998 Rolf Keller (ad interim)
- 1998–2001 Bernard Cathomas
- 2001–2002 François Wasserfallen (ad interim)
- 2002–2012 Pius Knüsel
- 2012–2016 Andrew Holland
- 2016–2017 Sabina Schwarzenbach (ad interim)
- 2017–2025: Philippe Bischof
- since July 1st, 2025: Michael Kinzer

== Presence abroad ==
Pro Helvetia funds the Centre Culturel Suisse in Paris and supports the cultural programs of two Swiss institutions abroad (Istituto Svizzero in Rome, Milan and Palermo; Swiss Institute in New York).

Pro Helvetia also operates liaison offices in Cairo (since 1988), Johannesburg (since 1998), Moscow, New Delhi (since 2007), Shanghai (since 2010), Centre culturel suisse Paris and a decentralized liaison office in South America (since 2021). The liaison office in Moscow, which opened in 2017, will close at the end of 2024.

== Controversies ==
In 2004, the exhibition “Swiss-Swiss Democracy” by Thomas Hirschhorn was held at the Centre Culturel Suisse in Paris. It was heavily attacked in particular because an actor urinated like a dog over a picture of then Federal Councillor Christoph Blocher. The criticism was also directed at Pro Helvetia, which had funded the exhibition with a total of 180,000 francs.

Pro Helvetia subsequently distanced itself from “any personal attacks on Christoph Blocher”, but at the same time stated: “The foundation sees it as one of the great achievements of a democratically constituted society that it also supports artists who criticize this very society. Moreover, artistic freedom is guaranteed by the constitution."

As a direct consequence of the so-called “Hirschhorn scandal”, the Swiss parliament voted on December 16, 2004 to cut Pro Helvetia's 2005 budget by 1 million francs.

== Bibliography ==
- Franz Kessler: Die Schweizerische Kulturstiftung «Pro Helvetia». Zürcher Studien zum öffentlichen Recht volume 112, Schulthess, Zurich 1993, ISBN 3-7255-3153-6
- Ursula Amrein: «Los von Berlin!» Die Literatur- und Theaterpolitik der Schweiz und das Dritte Reich. Chronos, Zurich 2004, ISBN 978-3-0340-0644-6
- Claude Hauser, Bruno Seger, Jakob Tanner (editors): Zwischen Kultur und Politik. Pro Helvetia 1939 bis 2009. Pro Helvetia/NZZ Libro, Zurich 2010, ISBN 978-3-03823-593-4
- Thomas Kadelbach: «Swiss Made». Pro Helvetia et l’image de la Suisse à l’étranger (1945–1990). Editions Alphil, Neuchâtel 2013, ISBN 978-2-940489-04-6
- Georg Kreis: Vorgeschichten zur Gegenwart. Selected essays volume 2, Schwabe, Basel 2004, ISBN 978-3-7965-2080-8
- Pauline Milani: Le diplomate et l’artiste. Construction d’une politique culturelle Suisse à l’étranger (1938–1985). Editions Alphil, Neuchâtel 2013, ISBN 978-2-940489-11-4

== See also ==
- Presence Switzerland
