= Daniel Brélaz =

Swiss mathematician and politician (1950–2025)

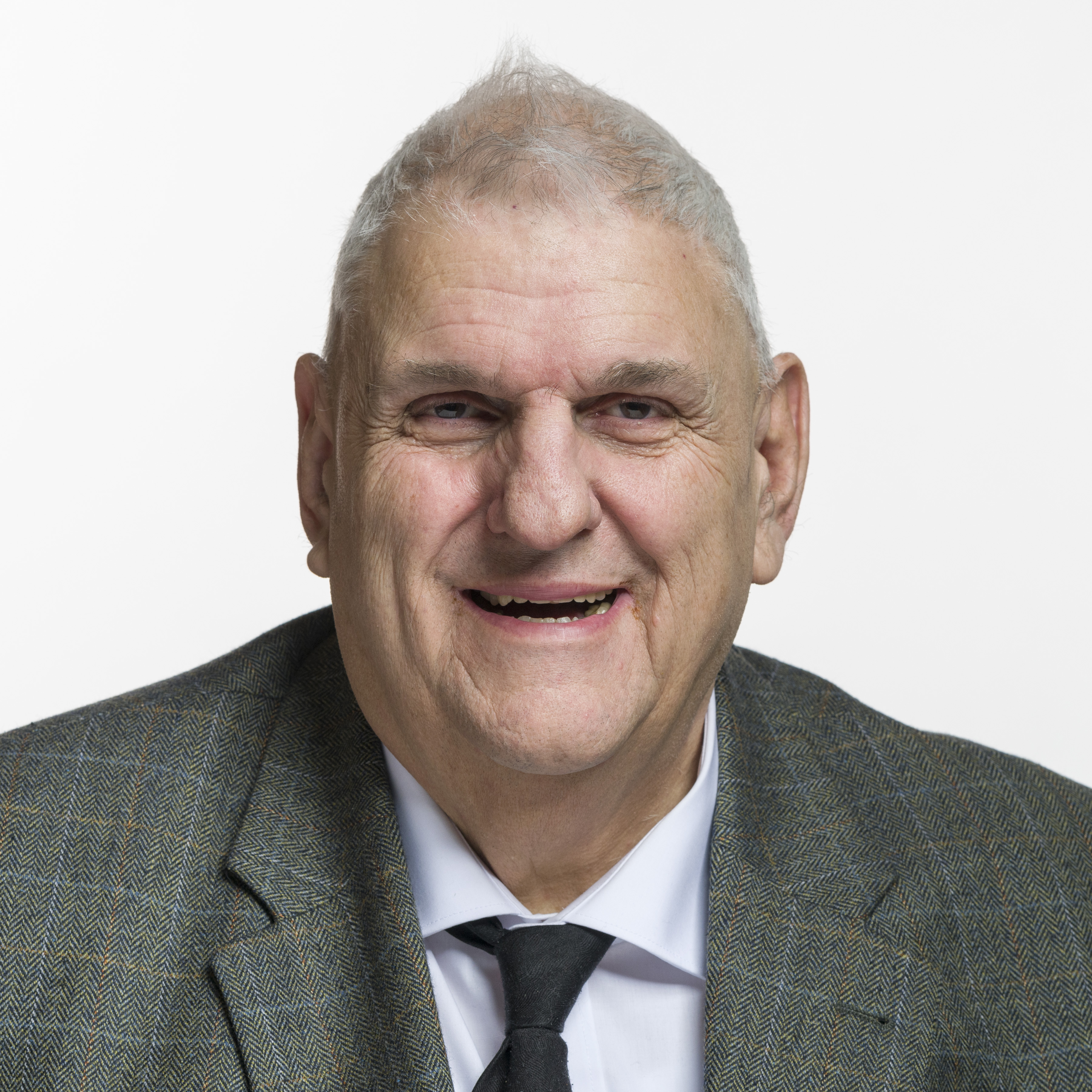

Member of the National Council of Switzerland
- In office 26 November 1979 – 15 December 1989
- Constituency: Canton of Vaud
- In office 3 December 2007 – 4 December 2011
- In office 30 November 2015 – 17 February 2022

Personal details
- Born: 4 January 1950 Lausanne, Switzerland
- Died: 28 December 2025 (aged 75) Lausanne, Switzerland
- Party: Green Party of Switzerland

Daniel Brélaz (4 January 1950 – 28 December 2025) was a Swiss mathematician and politician, a member of the Green Party of Switzerland and the 93rd mayor of Lausanne from 2001 to 2016. In 1979, Brélaz became the first Green representative elected to sit in a national parliament.

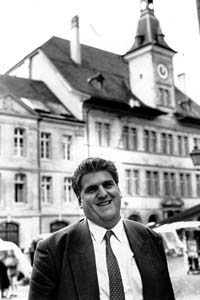
In 1979, Brélaz became the world first Green member of a national parliament.

Brélaz received a degree in mathematics from the École polytechnique fédérale de Lausanne (EPFL) in 1975, and afterwards taught mathematics. He is responsible for a well-known approximation algorithm for graph colouring.

In 1975, he joined the Group for the Protection of the Environment in Lausanne. In 1978 he was one of the first environmentalists elected to parliament, in the Grand Council of Vaud, and re-elected in 1982–1983. From 1979 to 1989, Brélaz was the first environmentalist elected to sit in a national parliament, in the National Council of Switzerland.

In 1989, he was elected to the City Council of Lausanne where he was responsible for industrial services. On 25 November 2001, he became the trustee responsible for finance and was re-elected in the first round of Vaud elections on 12 March 2006.

In 2007, he was elected again to the National Council. He resigned his seat on the Grand Council of Vaud but remained a trustee in Lausanne and was criticized for maintaining this dual mandate. On 13 March 2011, he was re-elected in the first round of the Lausanne municipal elections with 11,503 votes in his favour.

Brélaz was elected in 2015 Swiss federal election and re-elected in 2019. A month after his election, he announced that he would retire from the National Council in 2022. His term officially ended on 17 February 2022 and was succeeded by Raphaël Mahaim.

He was vice-president of the Administrative Council for Public Transportation in the Region of Lausanne.

Brélaz died on 28 December 2025 at the age of 75.

== Bibliography ==
- Brélaz, Daniel (1979). "New methods to color the vertices of a graph". Communications of the ACM. 22 (4): 251–256. doi:10.1145/359094.359101.
- Brélaz, Daniel (2019). L'avenir est plus que jamais notre affaire: l'impact des grandes disruptions. Lausanne: Favre. ISBN 978-2-8289-1803-3.
