= Sylvius Dapples =

Swiss politician (1798–1870)

- Born: 19 April 1798; Lyon, France
- Died: 7 September 1870 (aged 72); Lausanne, Switzerland
- Occupations: Politician; businessman
- Spouse: Adrienne Calame (m. 1824)
- Parents: Sylvius Dapples (father); Susanne Louise Julie Marie Gleyre (mother)

Sylvius Dapples (also Henri François Ferdinand Sylvius Dapples; 19 April 1798 – 7 September 1870) was a Swiss politician and businessman from the Dapples family. He founded the paper mills of La Sarraz, sat in the Grand Council of Vaud as a liberal, and was a member of the Council of State from 1843 to 1845. In 1840 he was a founding member of the liberal newspaper Le Courrier suisse.

== Biography ==
Sylvius Dapples was born in Lyon, the son of Sylvius Dapples, a merchant in Lyon in 1803 and later a banker in Lausanne, and Susanne Louise Julie Marie Gleyre. In 1824 he married Adrienne Calame, daughter of Georges Louis Calame.

Dapples was a founding member of the Vaud section of the Société contre l'incendie du mobilier (society against fire damage to movable property), founded in Bern in 1826, one of the first business enterprises with a national character. He founded the paper mills of La Sarraz (Papeteries de La Sarraz).

A liberal, Dapples sat in the Grand Council of Vaud from 1831 to 1836 and from 1841 to 1845. He was a member of the Council of State from 1843 to 1845 and was not re-elected after the Radical revolution of 1845. In 1840 he was a founding member of Le Courrier suisse, a liberal newspaper.

== Bibliography ==
- P.-A. Bovard, Le gouvernement vaudois de 1803 à 1962, 1982

=== Archives ===
- Archives de la Ville de Lausanne: Dossier Bourgeoisie
- Archives cantonales vaudoises: Fonds Campiche
