= Bergier commission =

Investigation of links between Nazi Germany and Swiss banks

The Bergier commission in Bern was formed by the Swiss government on 12 December 1996 in the wake of the then ongoing World Jewish Congress lawsuit against Swiss banks accused of withholding valuables belonging to Holocaust victims. It is also known as the ICE (Independent Commission of Experts) or UEK (abbreviated from its German name, Unabhängige Expertenkommission).

Founded in a decade when Switzerland had come under recurring criticism for its behaviour during World War II, particularly with respect to its relations with the Nazi government in Germany, the commission was established by the Swiss Parliament and headed by Jean-François Bergier, an economic historian. Made up of Polish, American, Israeli and Swiss historians, the commission's mandate was to investigate the volume and fate of assets moved to Switzerland before, during, and immediately after the Second World War. The investigation was to be made from a historical and legal point of view, with a particular emphasis on the links between the Nazi regime and Swiss banks. The mandate covers almost every type of asset, including gold, currency and cultural assets. The content of the research program was broadened by the government to include economic relations, arms production, "Aryanisation measures", the monetary system, and refugee policy.

== Approach ==
The commission did not set out to write a general history of Switzerland during the Nazi era; rather, it took as its task "to shed light upon certain controversial or insufficiently analyzed aspects of this history, aspects in which it appeared that Switzerland, that is to say its political authorities and economic decision-makers, had perhaps been derelict in assuming their responsibilities."

The commission was given unprecedented powers and resources by the Swiss Parliament:

- it was to have unimpeded access to the archives held by Swiss private companies including banks, insurance companies, and enterprises;
- the companies were prohibited from destroying any files relating to the period being examined by the commission;
- the initial budget of 5 million Swiss francs was increased to a total of 22 million francs.

== Focus ==
In the course of its work, the commission identified three areas where the government failed to carry out its responsibilities:

1. that of the Swiss government and its cantons' policy with respect to the refugees.
2. that which regards the concessions which the Federal state and a part of the private economy made to the Axis powers.
3. that which concerns the issue of restitution of assets once the war had ended.

== Final report ==
The commission presented its final report in March 2002.

== Refugee policy ==
Since the 19th century, Switzerland had a positive humanitarian image based upon the tradition of granting asylum, providing good offices, humanitarian aid, particularly through the work of the Geneva-based International Committee of the Red Cross (ICRC). However, after the First World War, Switzerland was not immune to xenophobic and antisemitic sentiments that were spreading through Europe. As in other Western countries in the 1930s, Switzerland, increasingly applied restrictions on the admission of foreigners in the name of national security.

Switzerland, apparently on its own initiative began to openly apply racist selection criteria according to the Nazi definition. Initial reports produced by the Bergier Commission received news coverage as they suggested that, in 1938, even before the war broke out, the Swiss Government requested the Nazi authorities to stamp all passports of German Jews with a "J" as the Swiss did not recognize the right to asylum of those fleeing racial persecution. The final report did not deem the "J stamp" a Swiss 'idea' but rather stated that the Swiss executive branch, the Federal Council, was responsible for consenting to an agreement with Germany that established its creation (although Swiss ambassador to Nazi Germany Hans Frölicher's support for the "J-Stamp", as part of the ongoing negotiations, was also mentioned.):

"It was the Federal Council which decided to close the borders on 18 August 1938, which signed the agreement with Germany concerning the «J»-stamp in Jewish passports on 29 September 1938 and which decided on the subsequent introduction of compulsory visas for German «non-Aryans» on 4 October 1938."

The change in description came as a consequence of a March 2001 retraction regarding the responsibility for the J Stamp and police chief Heinrich Rothmund's role by the Beobachter, the Swiss magazine that had originally revealed the existence of the J-Stamp in the 1950s. (See below: § Questioning the J-Stamp being a Swiss invention)

With the increasing persecution of Jews by the Nazi regime, Swiss restrictions were set apart from other restrictive policies of the Allies due to its geographical location: it was the easiest country on the continent for refugees to reach. Thousands of refugees were sent back even though authorities knew that they were likely sending them to their deaths.

The ICE concluded:

Switzerland, and in particular its political leaders, failed when it came to generously offering protection to persecuted Jews. This is all the more serious in view of the fact that the authorities, who were quite aware of the possible consequences of their decision, not only closed the borders in August 1942, but continued to apply this restrictive policy for over a year. By adopting numerous measures making it more difficult for refugees to reach safety, and by handing over the refugees caught directly to their persecutors, the Swiss authorities were instrumental in helping the Nazi regime to attain its goals.

Refugee figures are hard to come by. However the commission concluded that during the Second World War Switzerland offered refuge from Nazi persecution to some 60,000 refugees for varying periods of time, a little under 50% of whom were Jewish.

The commission carefully explained the difficulty of estimating the number of refugees, most of whom were probably Jewish, turned away. In a preliminary report for the commission, an estimate of 24,000 "documented rejections" was published. However, in the final report, perhaps having taken into account criticism of the earlier figures, the commission was more cautious, indicating that it must be assumed that "Switzerland turned back or deported over 20,000 refugees during the Second World War." Specifically, they reported that during the period from 1 January 1942, after the borders were closed, to 31 December 1942, 3,507 refugees were turned back.

In August 2001 when the commission issued a final conclusion, with respect to refugee policy, stating that, "measured against its previous stand in terms of humanitarian aid and asylum where its refugee policy was concerned, neutral Switzerland not only failed to live up to its own standards, but also violated fundamental humanitarian principles."

== Economic relations ==
The commission defined its focus: "The question which arises is not whether Switzerland should or could have maintained its business contacts and foreign trade with the warring powers in the first place, but rather how far these activities went: in other words, where the line should be drawn between unavoidable concessions and intentional collaboration."

=== Foreign trade relations ===
Switzerland, which relied heavily on foreign trade, experienced an increasingly difficult position during the protectionist 1930's. This worsened when war broke out in 1939. "Maintaining trade and business traffic was an 'essential precondition for conducting the wartime economy...'"

Swiss exports were a necessary condition for obtaining imports of necessary food and raw materials required for the population. Maintaining trade with the warring powers was thus required to meet "the domestic political objectives, in particular to supply the population with food and purchasing power." To achieve this goal, the Federal government set up structure in order to control foreign trade.

This was done in part through continual negotiations with the warring parties, particularly with Nazi Germany. On the whole, this policy was successful: "Switzerland's efforts to achieve close economic co-operation with Germany brought it dual advantages. Swiss businesses emerged from the war years both technologically and financially stronger. The state was able to realise the central objectives of its defence and economic policies."

Switzerland intended to continue economic relations with all countries, but because of the war, there was a large shift to relations with the Axis powers resulting in large increases in exports to the Axis powers and large reductions in trade with England and France (and to a lesser extent, the USA). Germany during the period July 1940 and July 1944 became the largest importer of Swiss goods. Thus domestic production (and employment) was directly linked on the success of trade negotiations, particularly with the German government.

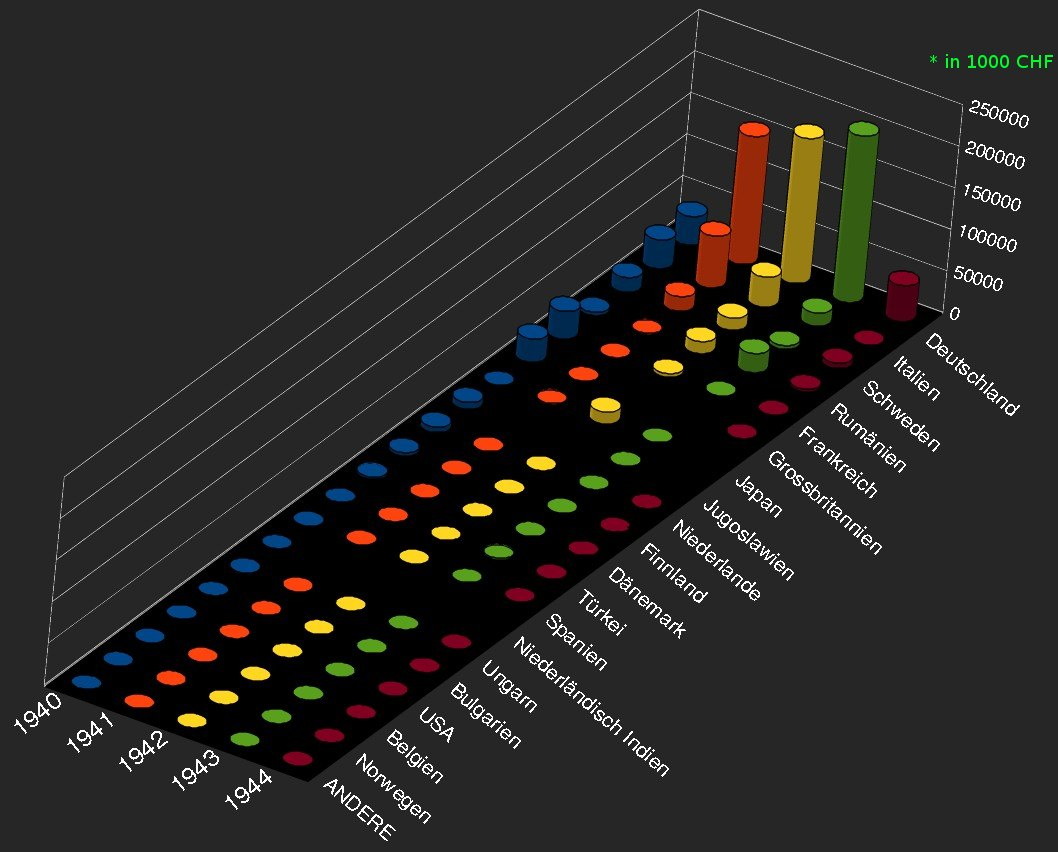
3D chart of Swiss exports of weapons, ammo and detonators from 1940 until 1944

The actual supplies of armament related goods exported to Germany was quite small: just 1% of German armament end products. Some specialized items, i.e. time fuses accounted for a little more than 10%.

Far more important was the role played by Switzerland's open capital market—sale of gold and securities—and as the Franc was the only convertible currency available to the Axis powers, it played a vital role in paying for certain strategic imports such as tungsten and oil.

In order to finance its imports from Switzerland, the German government demanded "clearing loans" which took the form of state guarantees to exporters. "The Swiss clearing loans made it possible for the German and Italian armies to fund their large-scale armaments purchases in Switzerland."

Whether the contribution of Swiss exports to German rearmament during the war is considered to have been more or less significant does not affect the principal findings of our investigation. Of greater importance was the role played by Switzerland in the years leading up to 1933, when – together with other European countries – it accommodated the covert rearmament of Germany. Without this opportunity, Germany would not have been able to start a pan-European war in so short a time.

=== Gold transactions ===
During the Second World War, Switzerland was the hub of European gold trade. 77% of the German gold shipments abroad were arranged through it. Between 1940 and 1945, the German state bank sold gold valued 101.2 million Swiss francs to Swiss commercial banks and 1,231.1 million francs through the Swiss National Bank (SNB). While its trading role as such could be seen as the result of maintaining neutrality, a proportion of the gold had in fact been stolen from private individuals and the central banks of Germany's defeated neighbors (particularly Belgium and the Netherlands). This looted gold was then sold to the Swiss for Swiss francs which were used for making strategic purchases for the German war effort.

Already during the war, the Allies condemned the gold transactions, and at its end, they demanded the "full restitution of the looted gold."

Swiss justification for their role ranged from lack of knowledge of where the gold originated to the right of seizure by an invading power to the need to maintain Switzerland's neutral status. The report points out that the legal arguments were particularly tenuous (and were pointed out to SNB officials at the time): the right to seizure as outlined in the Hague conventions pertains only to state property and not to the gold owned privately nor by the central banks concerned which were then private institutions. However, Swiss purchase continued right up until the end of the war.

Statistics indicating what proportion of the gold transferred was looted gold are hard to calculate. However, the commission points out that looted central bank reserves, mainly from Belgium, the Netherlands, and Luxembourg totaled 1,582 million francs and that the amount of gold stolen from Holocaust victims in Eastern Europe has been estimated 12.5 million francs while that expropriated and looted from individuals in the Reich was at least 300 million francs.

Postwar restitution: After negotiations, the Swiss government signed the Washington Agreement in May 1946 which called to a payment by the Swiss of 250 million francs in exchange for the dropping of claims relating to the Swiss role in incriminating gold transactions during the war period. However, the controversial issue of gold looted from the Netherlands was raised too late to be included in the Washington negotiations. The commission concluded:

...starting from 1942 in particular, it made a number of key decisions relating to the German gold transactions which had little to do with the technical aspects of currency management. Its analysis of the legal position after 1943 was fundamentally flawed. It was an affront to the Allies, who had repeatedly warned Switzerland about the gold purches, as well as to its own advisors and the Swiss jurists whom it had consulted. It is hardly surprising that the SNB's decisions have—quite legitimately—been the subject of historical and moral assessment on frequent occasions and that its decisions are judged as having been reprehensible.

=== The financial system ===
During World War II, Swiss banks loaned money to a wide variety of German enterprises which were involved in armaments as well as activities linked to activities involved in the extermination of the Jews. In addition, Credit Suisse and the Swiss Bank Corporation closely cooperated with major German banks which resulted "in some of the most questionable transactions of the wartime period: dealings with gold booty and/or looted gold. As late as 1943, the Union Bank of Switzerland granted Deutsche Bank a new loan of over 500,000 francs. Relations were maintained until the end of the war and even later."

There was very dubious trading on the unregulated Swiss security markets: looted assets from the newly occupied countries found their way into the Swiss markets, provoking a warning issued by the Allies in January 1943. "In 1946, the value of securities of dubious provenance to find their way to Switzerland during the war was estimated by the Federal Department of Finance (Eidgenössisches Finanzdepartement, EFD) to be between 50 and 100 million francs."

Many foreigners who deposited money with the Swiss banks were murdered by the Nazi regime. Some of their assets were handed over to the German government while the rest remained in dormant accounts in the Swiss financial institutions. After the war the resolution of the assets that had been handed over as well as the dormant accounts and looted securities was not solved. ICE reported:

The banks were able to use the amounts remaining in the accounts and to earn income from them. They showed little interest in actively seeking accounts of Nazi victims, justifying their inaction with the confidentiality desired by their customers. What the victims of National Socialism and their heirs thought to be the advantages of the Swiss banking system turned out to be disadvantageous for them.

=== Swiss insurance companies in Germany ===
The German market was an important market for the Swiss insurance companies even before the Nazis came to power in Germany in 1933. Many in the Swiss insurance sector were worried that German nationalism and xenophobia (not to mention the rise of a virulent anti-semitic ideology) would have adverse effects on it. This led some Swiss insurance firms (i.e. Vereinigte Krankenversicherungs AG, a subsidiary of Schweizer Rück) to anticipate German laws before they were enacted by dismissing their Jewish employees in 1933 even before the German laws were passed.

Toward the end of 1937, Swiss insurers came under increasing pressure to get rid of all Jewish employees not only in their offices in Germany, but also in their home offices in Switzerland. "With one exception, Swiss insurers supported the furnishing of such proof, thus endorsing discrimination against the Jews and extending the scope of Germany's racial laws to Switzerland as well."

After the destructive pogrom riots on the night of 9 to 10 November 1938, the German government issued an ordinance that Jews should pay for the destruction caused by the anti-Jewish rioters themselves and that any insurance money that was paid out should be paid to the German state rather than to the private individuals affected. The ICE found that, "In general, the Swiss companies reacted with remarkable passivity to the Nazi's flouting of established legal tradition....In this way, the Swiss insurers helped to cover up events which would have cast the completely illegal and immoral methods of the German state and party organisation in November 1938 into sharp relief."

=== Manufacturing companies ===
Swiss companies who were operating during the Nazi period in Germany had already been well-established before the Nazis came to power. Apparently, business concerns rather than an ideological commitment to Nazis determined their continued operation. However, established Swiss companies continued to operate although they adapted in different ways to the Nazis regime. The contribution of Swiss companies to the German war effort was important, if not decisive. The vast majority of the production of Swiss-owned companies in Germany was civilian goods. The commission concluded: "Among the few neutral countries, Switzerland made the greatest contribution towards the German war effort since it was Switzerland which had the greatest presence in both Germany itself and the countries it occupied." Finally, after the end of the war, the same companies which operated in Germany during the war were "able to continue or revive their activities without any major problems."

=== Cultural assets ===
Switzerland was an important hub for the traffic and trade in cultural assets such as paintings and other art objects. During the period between 1933 and 1945, the art market in Switzerland flourished. Much of the trade was legitimate, at least in the sense that the owners of a piece of art were selling in order to raise money often so they could flee Nazi territories. Thus much of the trade took place through the Swiss hub.

The commission distinguishes two types of questionable trade: 1) trade in "flight assets" and 2) trade in "looted assets".

Under definition of the commission, "Flight assets were those which were brought into or through Switzerland, often by their (Jewish) owners themselves." Their sale was directly linked to the persecution of their owners who needed to raise money for their flight or as a way to keep assets out of the hands of the Nazis or even the result of forced sales.

Looted assets were those that were confiscated by the Germans either from private individuals or from museums in Germany or occupied territories. A distinction is made between those looted assets that were confiscated "legally" from German museums, the so-called degenerate art, and the art that came from the plundering of public and private collections in the occupied territories. The commission concluded that "Swiss involvement in the Nazi regime's looting and cultural policy was considerable and diverse; as a result, Hitler's and Goering's collections were boosted by the acquisition of major works by the Old Masters and the school of German Romanticism".

However, the commission was unable to say much more about the size and importance of such involvement, concluding that "the notion that the trade in looted art – compared with the occupied territories of Western Europe – took place on a particularly large scale could not be confirmed. Conversely, one could argue that it is astonishing that this trade assumed such dimensions in Switzerland, a non-occupied country, which continued to function in accordance with the rule of law."

== Law and legal practice ==
The commission outlines a number of instances where established law as interpreted by the courts was ignored by the Federal government ruling by decree under the emergency powers granted to it by Federal parliament in 1939. One of the most important aspects was the abandonment of constitutional principal of equality before the law which had far reaching impact on the treatment of foreigners, minority citizens and contributed to the failure of the state to offer any diplomatic protection to Swiss Jews residing in Nazi occupied territory. They conclude, "...diplomatic practice increasingly came into line with the ethnic «völkisch» criteria adopted by the Nazi state, an approach which sharply conflicted with the constitutional equality enjoyed by Jews in Switzerland since 1874."

With respect to refugees, under existing Swiss domestic law, only refugees whose lives were at risk because of political activities could be granted asylum. This meant those who were fleeing because of racial persecution could be returned to the persecuting government. However, in July 1936, Switzerland ratified a provisional arrangement concerning the status of refugees coming from Germany: "Switzerland violated this agreement by handing refugees from Germany, whose lives were at risk and who had crossed the border (legally or illegally) and were not apprehended immediately in the border's vicinity, over to the German authorities on the borders with Austria or France."

The commission identified a number of areas, particularly in the domain of private international law, where the courts applied the doctrine of "ordre public" which is an explicit ethical component of law: for example, Swiss courts "consistently took the view that Nazi anti-Semitic legislation must be deemed to constitute injustice which violated all legal principles and should therefore not be applied in practice." However, this doctrine based on what was right and proper under Swiss law was not extended to practices which were incompatible with more universal, non-codified principles such as the principle of humanity.

== Other issues ==
=== Racial discrimination ===
The initial reaction to Nazi policy of discriminating against Jews was mixed with some of the companies complying readily and even anticipating laws to come, while others held out and resisted discriminating as long as they could.

However, the commission found that the practice of certifying the Aryan origin of its staff was widespread among owners and senior managers of Swiss companies in Nazi-occupied territory. Even before 1938, the Swiss Federal Political Department had suggested the applying of German law concerning race to Swiss companies. The commission concluded that this "clearly shows that the FPD, ..., either completely misjudged the legal, political and ethical implications of doing so, or ignored any misgivings they might have had for the sake of commercial interests."

After 1938, it became impossible for Swiss companies operating in Nazi controlled areas to avoid applying aryanization policy if they were to continue to operate.

The commission concluded, "that Swiss firms played an active role in the 'Aryanisation' process." Not only were their head offices in Switzerland aware of what was happening – often because their subsidiaries within Nazi-controlled territory were involved in the acquisition of Jewish businesses – but they approved of or even encouraged the process."

=== Forced labor ===
The commission also addressed the issue of the use of slave and forced labor in Swiss-owned firms and concluded: "that the figure quoted in the media – a total of over 11,000 forced labourers and prisoners of war employed in Swiss subsidiary companies throughout the Reich – is likely to be on the low side."

=== Swiss diplomatic service ===
The commission examined the role of the Swiss diplomatic service in protecting Swiss-owned property held in the Reich and concluded that a double standard was applied: whereas international law was strictly applied vis-a-vis Swiss property in the Soviet Union, Swiss authorities, "increasingly favoured the so-called theory of equal treatment, i.e., that if Germany was discriminating against its own Jewish citizens it was hardly possible to legally contest its equally harsh treatment of foreign Jews living in Germany."

== Reparations and restitution ==
Even before the end of the war, the Allies were critical of the role Switzerland played with respect to looted assets of the Nazis. The London Declaration of January 1943 "warned of transfers or dealings regardless of whether they 'have taken the form of open looting or plunder, or of transactions apparently legal in form, even when they purport to be voluntarily effected'" At the Bretton Woods Conference, July 1944, Resolution VI stated "that accepting looted gold and concealing enemy assets would not go unpunished." In March 1945, after intensive negotiation with the allied Currie mission, an agreement was signed by the Swiss which "provided for the restitution of all assets looted under the Nazi regime and moved to neutral territory." The Paris Conference on Reparations of December 1945 stated that German assets held in neutral countries such as Switzerland were to be transferred to "the Inter-Governmental Committee on Refugees (IGCR) [...] for the rehabilitation and settling of victims of German actions who could not be repatriated" as quickly as possible. Finally, the Swiss under the Washington Agreement of 1946 paid 250 million Swiss Francs in response to Allied pressure relating to looted gold held by the Swiss. The sum represented about one-fifth of all gold transactions estimated to have been made during the war.

=== Looted assets ===
The Swiss were very reluctant to engage with the Allies on the issue of looted assets. There was the feeling both on the left and the right that Switzerland had done nothing to make amends for. A Federal Councillor from the right-wing Catholic Conservative People's Party is quoted in the report as stating: "Switzerland has nothing to make amends for either to the victims of Nazi persecution or to Jewish or other organizations..." A Social Democratic national councillor made a similar statement at the time: "Actually, Switzerland has nothing to make amends for and countries are not entitled to make any claims", indicating the sentiment enjoyed a "broad consensus."

Although the Swiss paid 250 million francs in 1946 related to war-time gold transactions, the government refused to label it as restitution or reparation payments, but rather as a voluntary contribution to the reconstruction of war-torn Europe. Even though the Swiss signed the agreement in March 1945 at the end of the Currie mission visit, they did not keep their promises: three weeks later, an internal memo repudiated the promises and referred to the Allied pressure as "economic warfare". The report concluded, "By this time Switzerland was already pursuing a dual strategy which consisted on the one hand of seeking rapid agreement with the Allies, and on the other hand playing for time when implementing practical measures."

=== Bank accounts ===
With respect to the bank accounts held by Jewish victims, the Swiss authorities were reluctant to change any of their past procedures in light of the extraordinary events in Germany and German-occupied territories. Attempts to pass laws making it possible to transfer assets held in the banks were unsuccessful due to resistance by the Swiss Bankers Association. When as a result of continuing allied pressure, a decree was issued in 1945 which broke with past legal practice, it was valid only for a period of two years and it was not publicized internationally, making it likely that there would be few claimants.

=== Legal principles ===
The Swiss were also concerned that any restitution would be contrary to the principle in Swiss private law that ownership of assets bought in good faith by the existing owner belonged to him. However, the commission concluded that, "Legal principles were exploited for corporate objectives in the name of a blind adherence to the letter of the law." They pointed out that the "solution chosen, however, was blind to the fate of the victims. Contemporaries realised as early as 1945 that the extent of the crimes committed by the Nazi regime had called for special legislation that would have impinged on relations governed by private law in order to enable restitution to be made. In this situation, 'business as usual' was an attitude that allowed companies and individuals to profit from past injustice and the crimes committed in the name of National Socialism."

Although later work added more details about the unclaimed assets of Holocaust victims (see: Volcker Commission), it was clear that claims were rejected for narrow legalistic reasons. The commission found that the amount of unclaimed assets was much larger than the banks had claimed. At the same time, they came to the conclusion that the pace of growth of the postwar Swiss economy was not contributed to by the amount of unclaimed assets: the amounts were too small to make any contribution. The commission concluded, "The image of a banking system that built its wealth on assets expropriated from victims of the Nazi regime is not based on the facts."

=== Insurance policies ===
Swiss insurance companies had sold policies to Germans for many years. The German government seized policies held by German Jews and cashed them in with the Swiss companies, according to German laws passed by the Nazi government. After the war, the Swiss companies mainly refused to redeem policies held by holocaust victims and their heirs, arguing that the amounts had already been paid out according to German law. However, the commission concluded:

There is equally good reason to believe that not all those who were persecuted registered their policies with the Nazi authorities in accordance with the directives of 1938. It is therefore probable that a considerable number of policies belonging to Jews who remained in Germany were never paid out to those authorities.

== Criticism ==
Though generally accepted both within Switzerland and outside as an authoritative analysis and evaluation of Switzerland’s conduct during World War II, multiple conclusions drawn by the Bergier Commission were subject to criticism and contention.

=== Number of entry denials of Jews ===
Serge Klarsfeld, the French-Jewish historian, activist and Nazi Hunter stated in 2013 that the Swiss authorities rejected fewer WWII Jewish refugees than previously believed. He claimed that the number of entry denials was closer to 3000, significantly lower than the 24,500 mentioned by the Bergier Commission’s initial Report and the 20,000 mentioned by the final report. Klarsfeld’s estimate for the number of Jews admitted was 30,000. Klarsfeld believes a “maximum” of 1,500 Jews were rejected at the Swiss-French border, 300 Jews were turned away at the southern Swiss border with then-fascist Italy and that 1,200 people were rejected in the North and East at the borders with Germany and Austria.

=== Questioning the J-Stamp being a Swiss invention ===
One of the initial conclusions drawn by the Bergier Commission was that Switzerland asked the Nazi authorities to add a “J-stamp” to every German Jew’s passport. The claim that the Swiss government was responsible for the stamp predates the Bergier Commission. It was the Swiss political magazine Beobachter that originally stated in its March 31, 1954 edition that wartime Swiss Police Chief Heinrich Rothmund had suggested to the Nazis to add a J Stamp. Rothmund, who was still in office, resigned due to the scandal surrounding the revelation. In 2001, Beobachter recanted its claim and exonerated Rothmund. The magazine stated that the J-Stamp was the product of 1935 negotiations between the Nazi and Swiss governments relating to the imposition of visa requirements on all German citizens wishing to enter Switzerland. Based on the archived paper trail the German side (led by negotiator Werner Best) made the initial suggestion while Switzerland approved it at a joint meeting in 1938, where Rothmund was present. In its retraction, Beobachter stated Rothmund personally opposed any demarcation of Jewish German passports. The Bergier Commission’s final 2002 report retained the mention of the J-stamp, but did not call it a Swiss invention, after Beobachter’s 2001 retraction.

=== Lambelet's criticism ===
Swiss academic Jean-Christian Lambelet of the University of Lausanne published a critical paper (translated into English) in 2001 where he questioned the internal consistency, accuracy of several statements and statistics found in the Bergier report, as well as identified instances of what he thought was hyperbole that went beyond historical analysis and evaluation.

=== Gold transactions as a deterrent to German Invasion ===
Another Swiss academic, the historian Philippe Marguerat (at the time of the University of Neuchatel) believed that the Bergier Commission, though acknowledging (and then refuting) some Swiss arguments for the legality and moral permissibility of gold purchases from Nazi Germany, failed to take into consideration the inherent military deterrent value of the gold purchases as a justification considering Germany had already made plans to invade.

=== The Commission's mission ===
In 1998, shortly before the Commission began work, one member of Switzerland’s parliament, Luzi Stamm, of the Swiss People’s Party criticized the Commission’s mission to “qualify the actions of those responsible at the time politically and morally” as opposed to simply finding out the truth. The Bergier Commission went beyond truth and reconciliation. Acceptance by the Swiss public increased with the meeting of Al Gore and Ruth Dreifuss at the World Economic Forum in 1999.

=== The Arbeitskreis Gelebte Geschichte ===
A group of Swiss, many of whom had lived through World War II, started the Arbeitskreis Gelebte Geschichte/ Groupe de travail Histoire vécue/ Gruppo di Lavoro Storia Vissuta which translates to “The Working Group of Lived History.” This group, sought to react to and, when necessary, criticize the conclusions drawn by the Bergier Commission’s Final Report using oral history, stories of Swiss people’s lived experiences during the war. The working group had around 500 members, including former ambassadors and chief officials of the Federal Department of Foreign Affairs, former military officers with the rank of general, professors from various disciplines and personalities from the business world and Swiss industry. The Working Group of Lived History was itself staunchly criticized by Swiss members of the Bergier Commission, for not primarily focusing on documentary evidence.

== Membership ==
The commission included:

- Jean-François Bergier, Zug, (President)
- Władysław Bartoszewski, Warsaw
- Saul Friedländer, Jerusalem
- Harold James, Princeton (USA)
- Georg Kreis, Basel
- Sybil Milton, Washington, died in October 2000, replaced in February 2001 by Helen B. Junz
- Jacques Picard, Berne
- Jakob Tanner, Bielefeld, Zurich
- Joseph Voyame, Saint Brais (JU), resigned in April 2000, replaced by Daniel Thürer

== See also ==
- Switzerland during the World Wars
- Volcker Commission
