= Jack Diment =

Scottish footballer

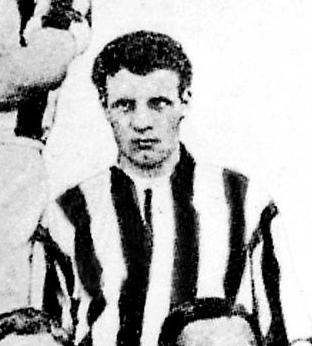
- Diment with Juventus in 1905

Personal information
- Full name: John Bowman Diment
- Date of birth: 1885
- Place of birth: Stoke Damerel, England
- Date of death: 12 October 1978
- Position: Midfielder

Senior career*
Years	Team	Apps	(Gls)
1903–1905	Newcastle United		
1905–1908	Juventus	11	(0)
1908	Torino		
1909	Milan		
- * Club domestic league appearances and goals

Jack Diment (born John Bowman Diment; 1885 – October 12, 1978) was a Scottish footballer who played as a midfielder.

== Early years ==
Diment was born in Plymouth in 1885 and grew up in Durris, near Aberdeen. They later moved to Newcastle upon Tyne. There Jack took a job with a shipping agency.

In Newcastle he met James Squair. Some records claim they were on the books at Newcastle United. That is disputed though, with at least one source claiming it is incorrect.

Squair (aged 19) and Diment (aged 20), both began to work for steamship owner Walter F Becker, who founded a club in Messina in 1901.

== Career in Italy ==
They both debuted for Juventus on 13 November 1904 playing for the Palla Dapples trophy, a trophy donated by Henri Dapples for a series challenge matches. They lost 1–0 at Genoa CFC. Diment was nicknamed "the mule", for his tenacious, no-nonsense approach.

His Juve debut in the Italian championship was on 3 May 1905, in a 3–0 home win v US Milanese. In his first season at Juventus, they won the Prima Categoria, a predecessor tournament of the 1929 formed Serie A. This was also prior to the Scudetto being awarded to the Italian league champions from 1924. Though 1905 is recognised as the first national league title won by Juve. His last match for the Juventus came on 2 March 1907 in a 4–1 home loss to Torino. He made 11 appearances in the competition for the Italian league title, without scoring. He also played in 12 other Juventus games such as friendlies, again without scoring.

In 1908, he played for Torino (as did Squair in his last year in Italian football at this level), and in 1909 for Milan. However, these were the two years in which the FIF banned non-Italians from playing in Italian championship matches.

== Style of play ==
Diment was a left footed midfielder.

== Honours ==
Juventus

Prima Categoria: 1905
