= List of mayors of Lausanne =

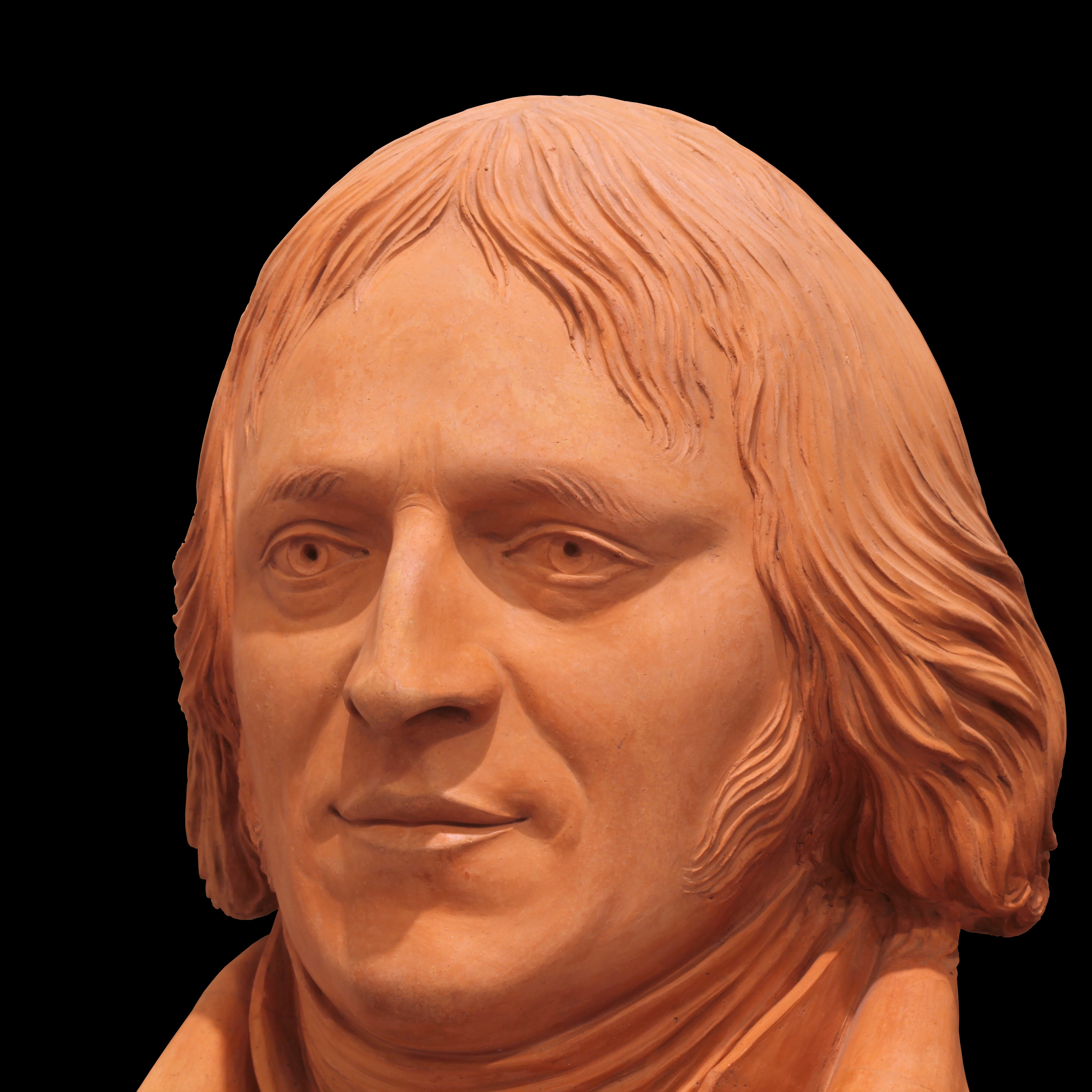
Samuel-Jacques Hollard mayor 1803–1815

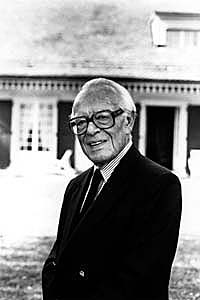
Pierre Graber was mayor 1946–1949. He later became a member of the Swiss Federal Council (1970–1978)

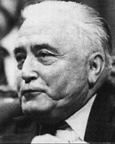
Georges-André Chevallaz was mayor of Lausanne 1958–1973 before becoming member of the Swiss Federal Council (1974–1983)

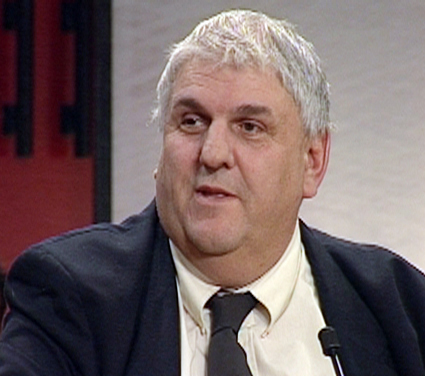
Daniel Brélaz, mayor elected 2002

This is a list of mayors of Lausanne, Switzerland. The mayor of Lausanne (syndic de Lausanne) presides over the municipal council (municipalité).

Mayor (Syndic) of Lausanne
Term	Mayor	Lifespan	Party	Notes
1803–1815	Samuel-Jacques Hollard	(1759–1832)		
1815–1842	Charles-Marc Secretan	(1773–1842)		
1843–1848	Edouard Dapples	(1807–1887)		
1848–1857	Victor Gaudard	(1797–1871)		
1857–1867	Edouard Dapples	(1807–1887)		
1867–1882	Louis Joël	(1823–1892)		
1882–1897	Samuel Cuénoud	(1838–1912)	Free Democratic Party	
1897	Berthold van Muyden	(1852–1912)		
1898–1900	Louis Gagnaux	(1851–1921)	Free Democratic Party	
1900–1907	Berthold van Muyden	(1852–1912)		
1907–1910	André Schnetzler	(1855–1911)		
1911–1921	Paul Maillefer	(1862–1929)	Free Democratic Party	
1922–1924	Arthur Freymond	(1879–1970)	Free Democratic Party	
1924–1929	Paul Rosset	(1872–1954)	Liberal Party	
1930–1931	Paul Perret	(1880–1947)	Free Democratic Party	
1931–1933	Emmanuel Gaillard	(1875–1956)	Free Democratic Party	
1934–1937	Arthur Maret	(1892–1987)	Social Democratic Party	
1938–1945	Jules-Henri Addor	(1894–1953)	Free Democratic Party	
1946–1949	Pierre Graber	(1908–2003)	Social Democratic Party	
1950–1957	Jean Peitrequin	(1902–1969)	Free Democratic Party	
1958–1973	Georges-André Chevallaz	(1915–2002)	Free Democratic Party	
1974–1980	Jean-Pascal Delamuraz	(1936–1998)	Free Democratic Party	
1981–1989	Paul-René Martin	(1929–2002)	Free Democratic Party	
1990–1998	Yvette Jaggi	(born 1941)	Social Democratic Party	
1998–2002	Jean-Jacques Schilt	(born 1943)	Social Democratic Party	
2002–2016	Daniel Brélaz	(1950–2025)	Green Party	
2016–present	Grégoire Junod	(born 1975)	Social Democratic Party	
