= Edmond Dapples =

Swiss physician and agronomist (1834–1914)

Edmond Charles Francis Dapples
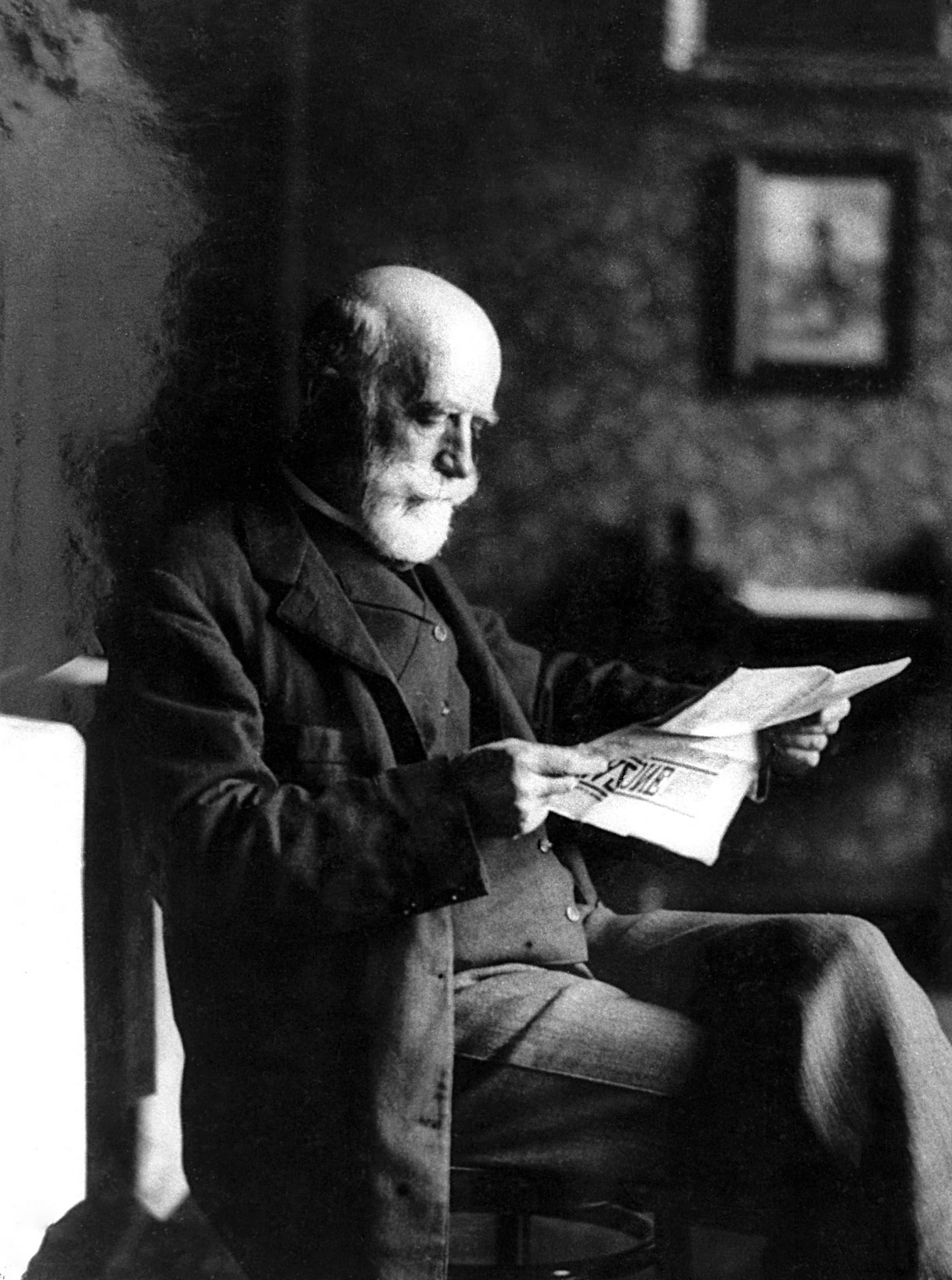
- Edmond Dapples reading a newspaper in his studio (1904)
- Born: 1834; Genoa, Italy
- Died: 1914 (aged 79–80); Grezzano, Italy
- Occupations: Physician, Agronomist
- Spouse: Elvire Susanne Caroline Henriette Bert (m. 1868)
- Children: Elvire Dapples

Edmond Charles Francis Dapples (1834–1914) was a Swiss physician and agronomist, known for his reforestation work and agricultural development in the Mugello region of Tuscany.

== Biography ==
=== Early life and medical career ===
Edmond Charles Francis Dapples belonged to a branch of the Swiss banking family Dapples, originally from the Canton of Vaud, which had settled in Genoa in 1820 to expand its economic activities.

On 31 July 1868, he married Elvire Susanne Caroline Henriette Bert in Torre Pellice, daughter of a Waldensian pastor. They had one daughter, Elvire Dapples, born in Genoa in 1870.

Dapples initially pursued a career as a surgeon, but in 1880, after the death of his wife Elvire, he lost faith in medicine and decided to abandon his profession to focus entirely on agriculture and forestry.

== Grezzano Estate and the "Little Swiss Mugello" ==
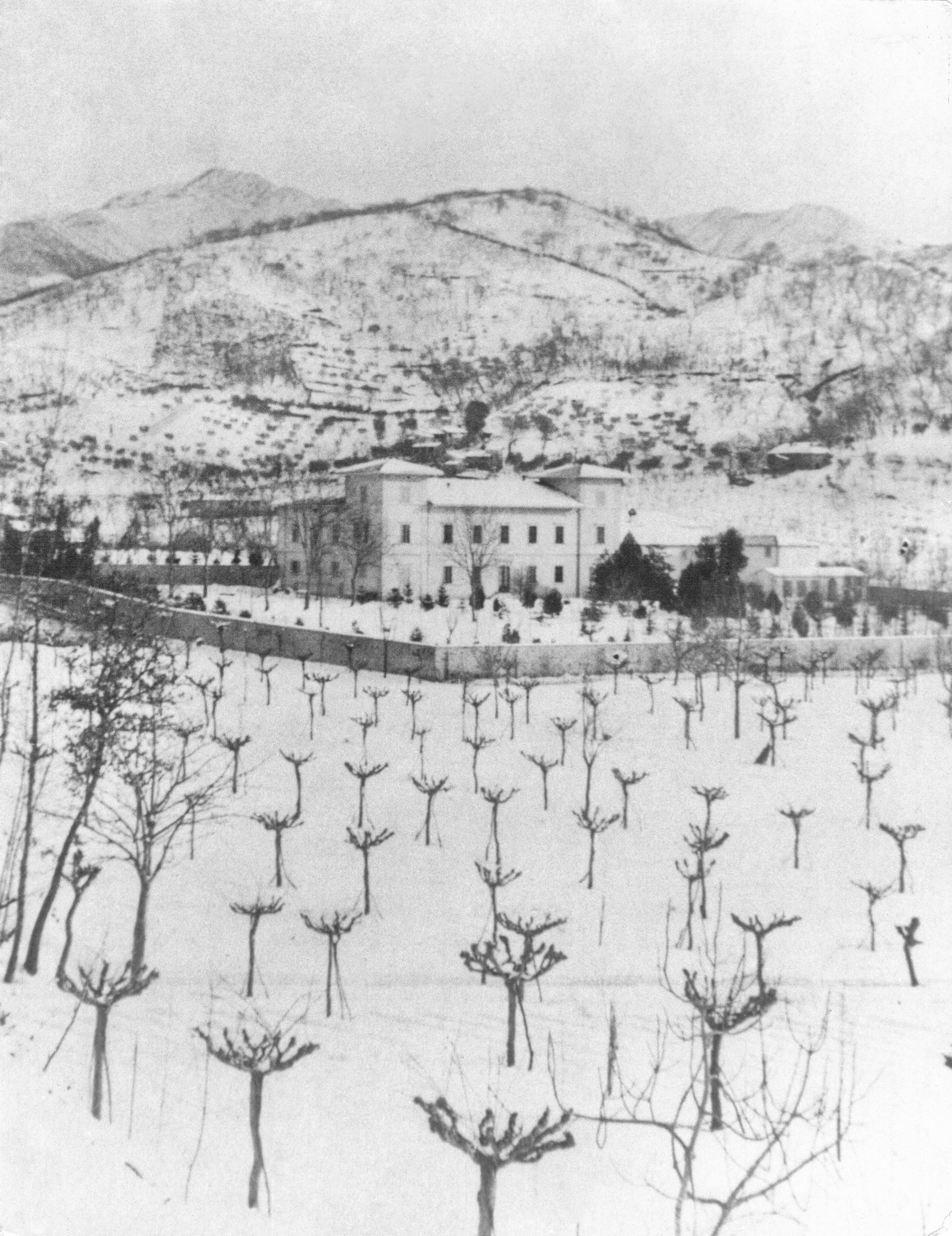
Villa Dapples in Grezzano (1904), showing the nursery and deforestation of the surrounding mountains.

In 1886, attracted by the thriving Swiss community in Florence, Dapples purchased Villa Dapples and several farms in Grezzano, Mugello, for 242,000 lire. He focused on modernizing agriculture and reforesting the area, leading to the estate being nicknamed the "Little Swiss Mugello".

Dapples worked alongside his nephews, including Henri Dapples, a well-known footballer for the Genoa Cricket and Football Club, as well as Charles and Louis Dapples, who continued his work after his death. Louis later became CEO of Nestlé, while Charles promoted photographic documentation of the estate and its reforestation projects.

Under Dapples' management, the property expanded significantly, shifting from pastoral farming to agro-forestry, with a greater focus on woodlands rather than livestock, likely due to the poor quality of the soil.

When Dapples arrived in Mugello, the region was suffering from severe hydrological instability, largely due to the Leopoldine forest regulations, which were too permissive and inadequate to preserve forest cover and protect the land. Unlike many landowners of the time, Dapples invested heavily in reforestation, going against the prevailing agricultural trends.

By 1911, the Dapples estate covered 750 hectares, including 280 hectares of forest, 320 hectares of pasture, and 150 hectares of cultivated land. To avoid conflicts with local shepherds, Dapples would buy land and reforest it.

By 1914, he had reforested 300 hectares of what had previously been barren, rocky terrain.

Even the current Museo Casa d'Erci in Grezzano was once one of the farms purchased by Dapples in 1886, and it has remained well-preserved to this day.

After his death in 1914, his daughter Elvire Dapples inherited and managed the estate.

== Dapples Archive ==
A photographic archive documenting Dapples' work is preserved at the Museo Casa d'Erci, consisting of approximately 500 photographs taken between 1904 and 1951. The archive offers a valuable historical record of agricultural life in Mugello during that period. The materials were donated by the last descendants of the Dapples family before they left Grezzano.

== Bibliography ==
- "Dapples" (in French). Historisches Lexikon der Schweiz.
- "Attualità e Cultura - The Forestry and Agricultural Work of Dapples in Mugello".
