= Édouard Dapples =

Swiss politician

Édouard Dapples (12 December 1807 in Lausanne – 30 April 1887 in Nice), member of the Dapples family, was a Swiss politician, syndic of Lausanne from 1843 to 1848 and from 1857 to 1867, member of the Swiss National Council from 1851 to 1854 and from 1857 to 1866, he presided this assembly in 1861. Avenue Édouard Dapples in Lausanne is named after him.

Preceded by Johann Baptist Weder	President of the National Council; 1860/1861	Succeeded by Karl Karrer
