= Yvette Jaggi =

Swiss politician (born 1941)

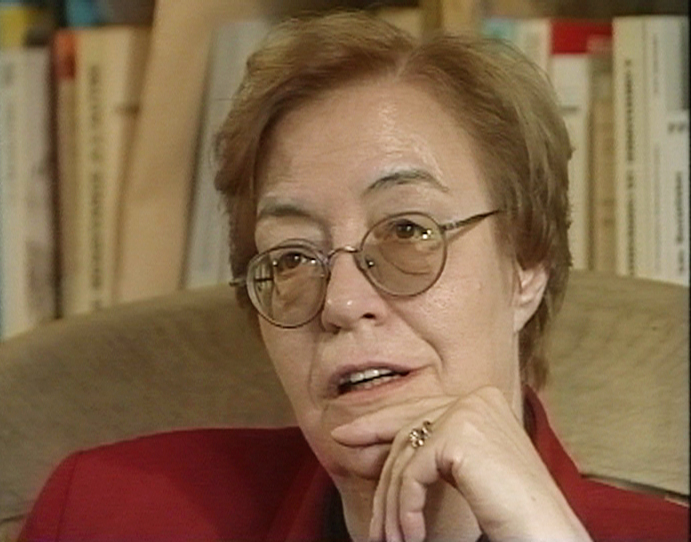

President of Pro Helvetia
- In office 1998–2005
- Preceded by: Rosemarie Simmen
- Succeeded by: Mario Annoni

86th Mayor of Lausanne
- In office 1 January 1990 – 31 December 1997
- Preceded by: Paul-René Martin
- Succeeded by: Jean-Jacques Schilt

Member of the Council of States
- In office 30 November 1987 – 24 November 1991

Member of the National Council
- In office 26 November 1979 – 29 November 1987

Personal details
- Born: 11 February 1941 (age 85) Lausanne, Vaud, Switzerland
- Party: Social Democratic Party
- Education: University of Lausanne
- Occupation: politician
- Awards: Ordre national du Mérite

Yvette Jaggi (born 11 February 1941) is a Swiss politician. A member of the Social Democratic Party, she served in both the National Council and the Council of States. She was the first woman to be elected as mayor of Lausanne in 1989. From 1998 to 2005, she served as the president of Pro Helvetia. In 2013, Jaggi was made as a Commandeur of the Ordre national du Mérite.

== Early life and education ==
Jaggi was born in Lausanne on 11 February 1941. She studied economics and humanities at the University of Lausanne, graduating in 1964. In 1970, she earned a doctorate in political science.

== Career ==
Jaggi joined the Social Democratic Party of Switzerland in 1972, a year after Swiss women obtained the right to vote in federal elections during a 1971 referendum.

In 1979, she was elected to the Swiss National Council.

From 1987 to 1991, Jaggi served in the Swiss Council of States.

She was elected to the Lausanne Municipal Council in 1981 and headed the city's finance department. In 1989, she was re-elected to the same office and, in November of that year, was elected as the first woman, and third socialist, mayor of Lausanne. She took mayoral office in 1990 and was mayor until 1997, having been re-elected in 1993.

== Honours ==
On 21 February 2013, Jaggi was decorated as a Commandeur of the Ordre national du Mérite in a ceremony at the French Embassy in Bern.
