= Dapples =

The Dapples family is a Vaudois family, likely originating from Apples, Vaud, Switzerland.

== Origins ==
The family is mentioned in Vufflens-le-Château at the end of the 15th century and later settled before 1596 in Bremblens and Morges. It acquired citizenship in Lausanne in 1603.

Among its members were numerous doctors and Reformed pastors, and several held political and academic positions both in Lausanne and in the canton of Vaud.

== Italian Branch ==
In 1820, a branch of the Swiss Dapples family, French-speaking and Protestant, moved from Lausanne to Genoa to better develop their economic activities, taking advantage of the opportunities offered by the Ligurian context of the time.

== Dapples & C. ==
In the 1840s, the Dapples family became shareholders in the Bank of Genoa and later in the National Bank of the Sardinian States. Through the company Dapples & C., the family diversified its investments into strategic sectors such as banking, mining, and naval industries, accumulating a significant portfolio of equity holdings.

However, in April 1888, the company was forced to suspend payments and initiated liquidation proceedings.

== The "Little Switzerland" of Mugello ==
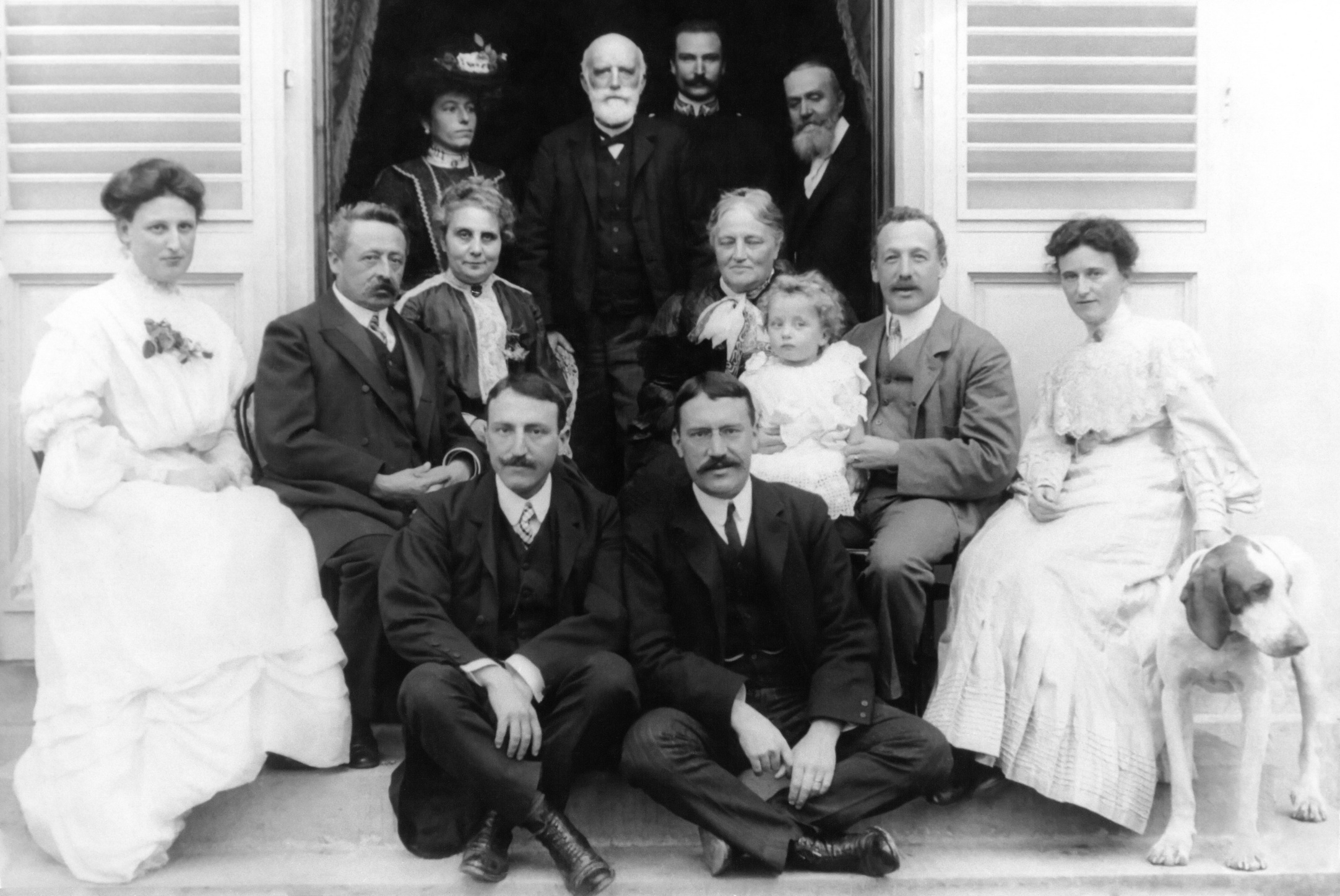
The Dapples family at the villa in Grezzano, Tuscany, (1904). In the centre is Edmond Dapples, seated on the ground are Henri Dapples on the left and Louis Dapples on the right. Elvire Dapples is the last on the left sitting on the chair.

In the late 19th and early 20th centuries, the Dapples family established a strong presence in Grezzano, a village now part of the municipality of Borgo San Lorenzo in the Mugello region of Tuscany, which became known as the "Little Switzerland of Mugello" due to the influence of Swiss families who settled there. This connection began with Edmond Dapples, who purchased Villa Dapples in 1880, transforming it into a center for agricultural and forestry innovation. Seeking to expand the family's entrepreneurial activities, Edmond invited his nephews, Henri Dapples and Louis Dapples, to join him in developing new business ventures in the region.

Henri Dapples played a particularly active role in Grezzano, where Edmond gifted him Villa al Monte, a residence that became central to his life in Tuscany. Meanwhile, Louis Dapples spent only a brief period in Grezzano before destiny led him to become the CEO of Nestlé. However, during his stay, he contributed to preserving the family's history by compiling photographic albums documenting life in Grezzano, which are now safeguarded at the Casa d’Erci Museum.

After Edmond's passing, his daughter Elvire Dapples continued managing the estate until 1958, maintaining the family's presence in Grezzano until her death. The Dapples family's initiatives included reforestation projects aimed at countering soil erosion and improving land management. These efforts laid the foundation for sustainable forestry in the region, influencing later post-World War II reforestation campaigns that sought to restore wooded areas devastated by military deforestation along the Gothic Line.

Today, the legacy of the Dapples family remains deeply embedded in Grezzano, with historical documents and artifacts preserving their contributions to the region's agricultural and environmental history.

== Notable Members ==
=== Vaud Branch ===
- Jean-Pierre Dapples (1616–1640), doctor of medicine and rector at the Lausanne College.
- Jean-François Dapples (1690–1772), theologian and professor of Greek and ethics at the Lausanne Academy.
- Charles-Marc Dapples (1837–1920), engineer and politician, also a professor at the University of Lausanne and member of the Lausanne Council.
- Édouard Dapples (1807–1887), politician, mayor of Lausanne, member of the Grand Council of Vaud, the Swiss National Council, and President of the National Council.
- Sylvius Dapples (1798–1870), politician, including membership in the Grand Council of Vaud and the State Council.

=== Italian Branch ===
- Edmond Charles Francis Dapples (1834–1914), physician and agronomist, born in Genoa, was the creator of the Grezzano estate maintained with state-of-the-art agro-forestry techniques.
- Louis Dapples (1867–1937), manager, also chairman of the Board of Directors of Nestlé.
- Henri Arthur Dapples (1871–1920), agronomist, born in Genoa, was one of the first footballers for the Genoa Cricket and Football Club, participating in Italy's first football championships and winning five titles. In 1903, he introduced the "Dapples Ball". Later, he moved to Grezzano where he founded an innovative farm.

== Bibliography ==
- "Dapples" in German, French and Italian in the online Historical Dictionary of Switzerland.
