= Jean-François Bergier =

Swiss historian

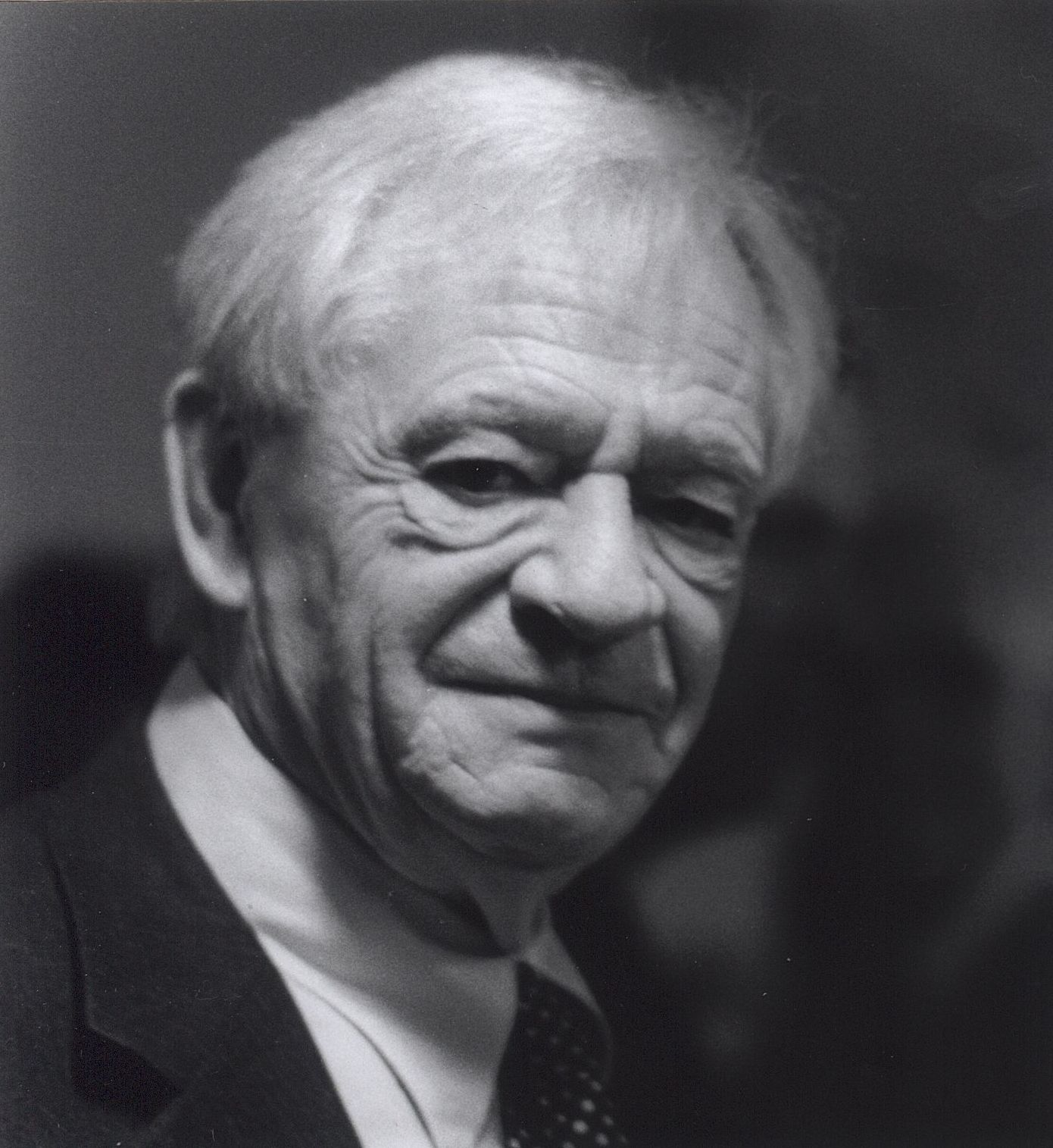
- Born: 5 December 1931; Lausanne
- Died: 29 October 2009 (aged 77); Blonay
- Education: archivist-paleographer, bachelor's degree, doctorate
- Alma mater: École Nationale des Chartes; University of Lausanne
- Occupation: Historian, economist, calligrapher, university teacher, archivist, palaeographer
- Employer: ETH Zurich (1969–1999); University of Geneva (1963–1969); University of Paris (1976–1978)
- Awards: honorary doctor of the University of St. Gallen (1985); honorary doctorate from University of Grenoble-II (1999)

Jean-François Bergier (French: [bɛʁʒje]; 5 December 1931, Lausanne, Vaud – 29 October 2009, Blonay) was a Swiss historian. He was a professor at the University of Geneva from 1963 to 1969 and at the Swiss Federal Institute of Technology in Zurich until his retirement in 1999.

In December 1996, he was appointed president of the Independent Commission of Experts: Switzerland - Second World War, often referred to as the Bergier commission, which examined the relationship of Switzerland with Nazi Germany during World War II.

== Personal life ==
Bergier was born on 5 December 1931 in Lausanne, the son and grandson of Protestant pastors. Both sides of his family were solid members of Swiss bourgeois society. He was married twice and had two sons from his first marriage.

== Education ==
Beginning his studies at the University of Lausanne, he went in 1950 to Paris where he studied both at the Ecole des Chartes and the Sorbonne where he was deeply influenced by the French historian Fernand Braudel and others of the Annales School. He studied at Oxford University and returned to Switzerland where he took his doctorate at the University of Geneva, writing a thesis on Geneva in the European economy of the Renaissance.

== Professional life ==
Beginning his academic career as a professor at the University of Geneva in 1963, he moved in 1969 to the prestigious History of Civilizations chair at the polytechnic in Zurich where he remained until his retirement in 1999.

In 1983 he published a book, Economic History of Switzerland. In addition to his work as a medieval and economic historian, he was interested in the history of the Alps and helped to found an international association for the history of the Alps in 1995.

== Independent Commission of Experts ==
During the post-WWII period, Switzerland came under criticism for its war-time behavior vis-a-vis the Nazi Government in Germany. In 1996 the Swiss parliament set up the Independent Commission of Experts with wide powers to examine Switzerland's role during the war. Jean-François Bergier was asked to head the commission as its president, a role which he accepted in December 1996 and carried out until the final report was issued in 2001 and the commission was dissolved.

The final report of the commission was damning, shattering many myths about the Swiss government's wartime policies and behaviour. The lengthy series of in-depth reports documented the restrictive policy of Switzerland toward Jewish refugees during the Holocaust and it identified a number of controversial relationships between Swiss and German companies and financial institutions which acted to support the German war effort. In particular, with respect to the refugees, Bergier concluded, "that Switzerland "got involved in (Nazi) crimes by abandoning refugees to their persecutors" – even though the Swiss government knew by 1942 of the Nazis' final solution and that rejected refugees would almost certainly face deportation and death...Large numbers of persons whose lives were in danger were turned away – needlessly,..."

The reports of the commission (see: https://www.uek.ch/en/) stirred up political criticism, with right-wing People's Party member Oskar Freysinger incorrectly describing it as "a pseudo-historical work ordered up by the World Jewish Congress". When asked why he accepted such an investigative and editing role, Bergier replied, "Above all there's the issue of Switzerland's historical responsibility. You have to be responsible for your past. On that condition you can face the future clearly and calmly."

== Principal writings (in French) ==
- Histoire économique de la Suisse, Lausanne, Payot, 1984
- Hermès et Clio: essais d’histoire économique, Lausanne, Payot, 1984
- Naissance et croissance de la Suisse industrielle, Berne, Francke, 1974
- Une histoire du sel, Fribourg, Office du Livre, 1982
- Guillaume Tell, Paris, Fayard, 1988
- Europe et les Suisses. Impertinences d’un historien, Genève, Zoé, 1996
- Bertrand Müller, Pietro Boschetti, Entretiens avec Jean-François Bergier, Genève, Zoé, 2006
