= Tony Diment =

English cricketer

Personal information
- Full name: Robert Anthony Diment
- Born: 9 February 1927; Tortworth, Gloucestershire, England
- Died: 18 June 2005 (aged 78); Leicester, Leicestershire, England
- Batting: Right-handed
- Role: Batsman

Domestic team information
- Years: Team
- 1952: Gloucestershire
- 1955–58: Leicestershire
- First-class debut: 23 July 1952 Gloucestershire v Essex
- Last First-class: 30 August 1958 Leicestershire v Gloucestershire

Career statistics
Competition	FC
Matches	60
Runs scored	1595
Batting average	16.44
100s/50s	–/6
Top score	71
Balls bowled	6
Wickets	–
Bowling average	–
5 wickets in innings	–
10 wickets in match	–
Best bowling	0/4
Catches/stumpings	35/–
- Source: CricketArchive, 18 August 2013

Robert Anthony Diment (9 February 1927 – 18 June 2005) was an English cricketer who played for Gloucestershire in 1952 and for Leicestershire between 1955 and 1958. He was born at Tortworth, Gloucestershire and died at Leicester.

Diment was a right-handed middle-order batsman who was recruited by Leicestershire in 1955 as assistant secretary to the secretary/captain, Charles Palmer, and was therefore allowed to play as an amateur. He played in 59 first-class games for the county over the next four seasons, being a fairly regular member of the side in both 1957 and 1958. But although he passed 50 in six innings, his career batting average was only 16 and his highest first-class score was just 71, made in his first match for Leicestershire, against Derbyshire in 1955. He had earlier played a single match for his native Gloucestershire in 1952, without success.

Palmer retired as both player and secretary at the end of the 1957 season. Diment succeeded him as secretary, but Leicestershire recruited Willie Watson, the Yorkshire and England professional player, as captain from 1958. When Watson regained his Test place that season and also missed a few matches through injury, Diment captained the Leicestershire team in five games: they included the last game he played in first-class cricket.

Diment remained as the secretary of Leicestershire until after the 1959 season, but played only for the second eleven that year. In a Minor Counties Championship match against Shropshire in July 1959 he made an unbeaten 200 at more than a run a ball, astonishingly fast for an era of stodgy batsmanship. But at the end of that season he left Leicestershire to take a job in the leather industry.
