= Georg Kreis =

Swiss historian

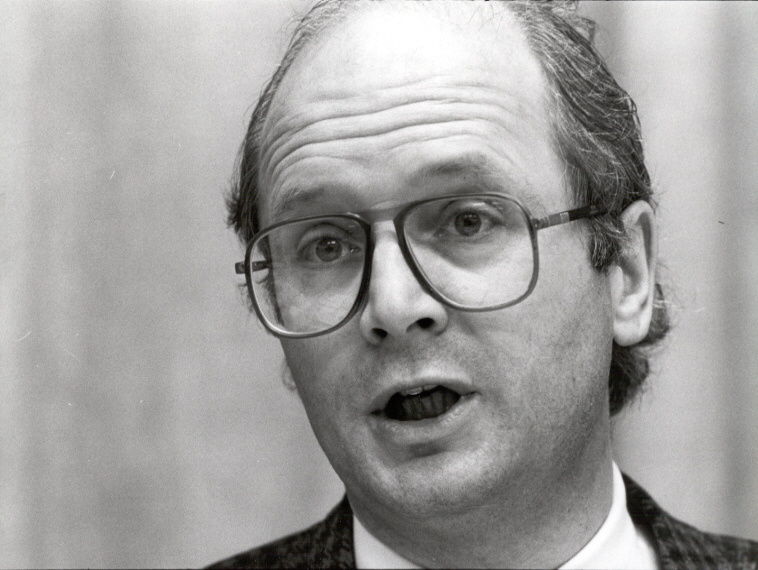
- Kreis in 1988

Georg Kreis (born November 14, 1943) is a Swiss historian. He is a professor emeritus of modern general history and history of Switzerland at the University of Basel and was head of the University’s Europa Institute until July 2011. Aside from his academic duties, Kreis was the President of the Swiss Federal Commission against Racism, a Swiss government-supported commission of experts, from its founding in 1995 until 2011.

== Biography ==
He received his PhD from the University of Basel in 1972 with a thesis on censorship in Switzerland during the Second World War. He completed a postdoc at the same institution in 1981.

He is married, has three sons and a grandson.

== Career ==
He was appointed a member of the Bergier Commission of historians to investigate Switzerland’s conduct during World War II. Kreis was quoted by the New York Times as stating he felt the scandal about Nazi Gold and the World Jewish Congress lawsuit against Swiss banks unearthed anti-Semitism that had always been part of the Swiss societal fabric.

He also lead a research project financed by the Swiss Government to investigate Switzerland’s ties to Apartheid South Africa and authored the project’s final report. Kreis also lead a renowned 2014 project to write an all-encompassing history of Switzerland, based on newly released archival sources.

In 2006, Swiss news magazine Schweizer Illustrierte designated Kreis to be one of the 100 most important Swiss citizens of the year. In 2007, he won the Fischhof Prize issued annually by the Swiss Society for Minorities, a group advocating for the rights of minorities in Switzerland.

The publication of Kreis’ autobiography in 2018, led to him being profiled in multiple Swiss newspapers such as Neue Zürcher Zeitung and Basler Zeitung.

In 2022, Georg Kreis gave multiple interviews to the Swiss press about current affairs. One of these interviews was about Swiss neutrality in the wake of the Russian invasion of Ukraine, another about the removal of historical artifacts with alleged colonial connections from Swiss cities. In 2023, Kreis was interviewed by Swiss Television about his latest project, regarding Swiss ties to colonialism in Africa.

Kreis was heavily criticized by members of the right-wing populist Swiss People’s Party (SVP) after he compared the Swiss minaret ban (which the party proposed and successfully campaigned for the Swiss people to vote for in a 2009 referendum) to a hypothetical SVP-initiated ban on synagogues during World War II, with calls for his resignation as Head of the Swiss Federal Commission against Racism.

Kreis was a member of the Free Democratic Party of Switzerland before quitting the party in 2013, citing its apparent ideological rightward shift. He had long publicly criticized party leadership for allying itself with the Swiss People’s Party as opposed to more moderate political forces.
