= Raphaël Mahaim =

Swiss politician

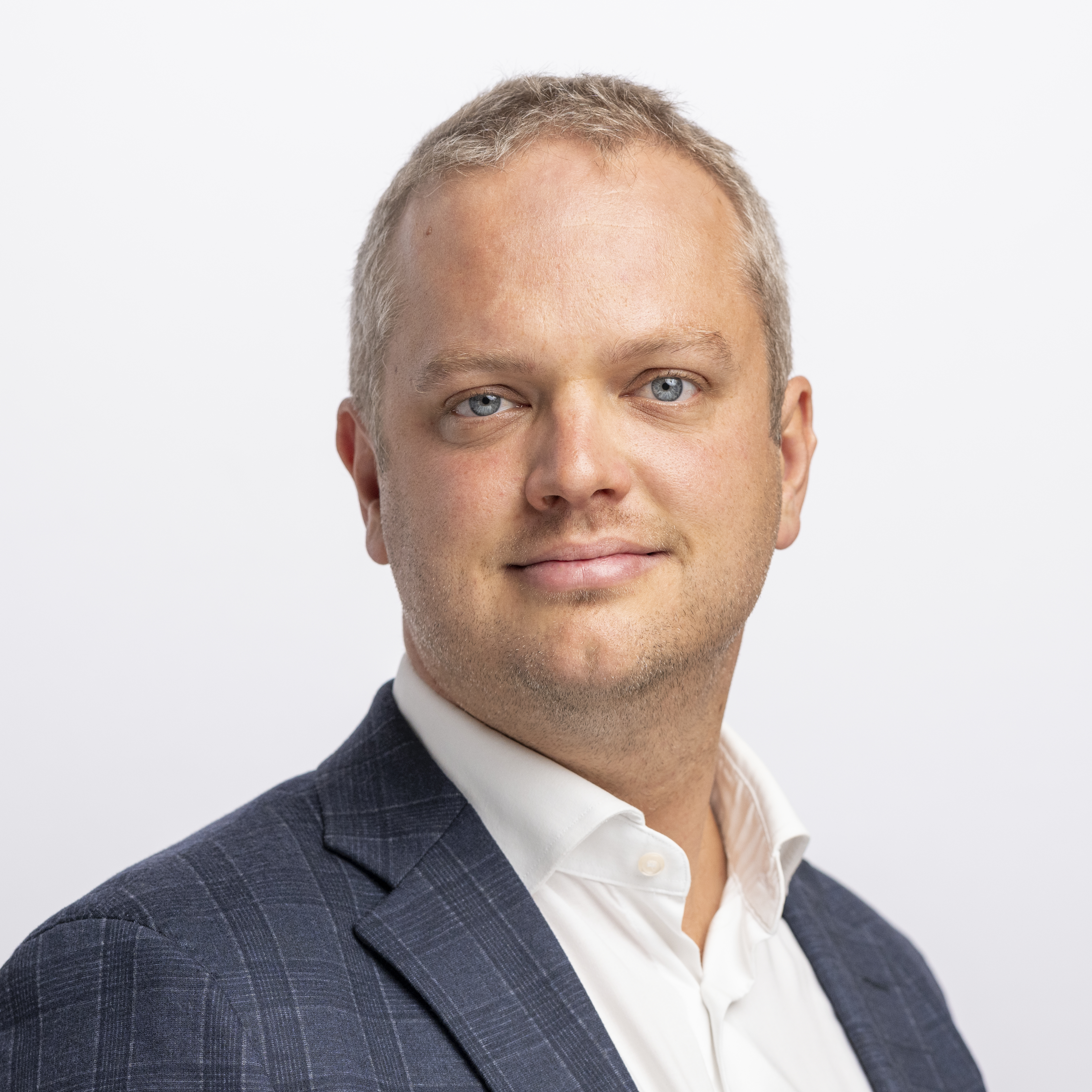
- Official portrait, 2023

Raphaël Mahaim (French: [ʁaphaɛl maɛm]; born 31 December 1983) is a Swiss attorney and politician who serves on the National Council (Switzerland) for the Green Party since 2022. He previously served on the Grand Council of Vaud between 2007 and 2021.

== Early life and education ==
Mahaim was born 31 December 1983 in Lausanne, Switzerland, the only child to Cyril Mahaim and Francine Mahaim (née Cornaz). His father was a chemist and most notably an executive for Sandoz and Firmenich whilst his mother was a jurist. He has a younger sister, Danila Riviere (née Mahaim), who was adopted from Guatemala.

His paternal family is Jewish and originally hails from Belgium. He is a descendant of Ernest Mahaim (1865–1938), originally from Momignies, who served as liberal Belgian minister in the Government of Carton de Wiart in 1920–1921. The Mahaim family naturalized in Neuchâtel in 1938.

From 1996 to 1997, his family temporarily relocated to the New York metropolitan area, where his father was transferred working for Aroma Chemicals (part of Firmenich). Upon their return to Switzerland, Mahaim completed a Licentiate in Law and a Bachelor of Science in Environmental studies in 2006. He also complete a Doctor of Law at the University of Fribourg.

== Personal life ==
Mahaim is married to Elodie Mahaim (née Biermann). They have three children.
