= Henri Dapples =

Swiss footballer (1871–1920)

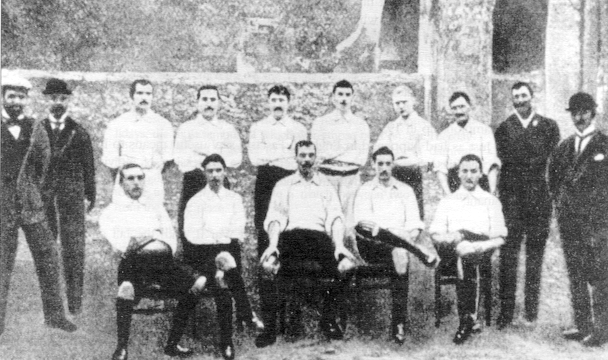
- The Genoa team in 1899. Henri Dapples is the fourth from the right.

Personal information
- Full name: Henri Arthur Dapples
- Date of birth: 4 May 1871
- Place of birth: Genoa, Italy
- Date of death: 9 May 1920
- Place of death: Zurich, Switzerland
- Position: Forward

Senior career*
Years	Team	Apps	(Gls)
1898–1903	Genoa	9	(2)
- * Club domestic league appearances and goals

Henri Arthur Dapples (4 May 1871 – 9 May 1920) was a Swiss footballer who played as a forward for Genoa CFC, winning the first Italian Football Championship and four subsequent national titles.

== Biography ==
=== Family background ===
Henri Dapples was born in Genoa, but was of Swiss nationality. He was the son of a banker from Lausanne and a member of the Dapples family, originally from the Canton of Vaud. A branch of this family settled in Genoa in 1820 to develop its business activities.

Dapples had strong footballing connections: his maternal uncles Jean De Fernex, Charles De Fernex, and Eugène De Fernex were early football pioneers in Turin.

=== Personal life and later years ===
Following his football career, Dapples moved to Grezzano, a hamlet of Borgo San Lorenzo in Tuscany, where he lived in a villa (Villa al Monte) given to him by his uncle, Edmond Dapples, a retired surgeon.

There, in 1917, he married his cousin Henriette (also known as Enrichetta Elena) in Florence, though they had no children.

He spent the rest of his life dedicated to his passion for hunting and dogs.

Suffering from cancer, he returned to Switzerland for treatment but died in a clinic in Zurich on 9 May 1920.

=== Football career ===
Dapples made his debut in the Italian Football Championship in 1898 with Genoa CFC, the year of the very first official Italian league tournament. His team won the title that season, marking the beginning of a successful career.

He competed in six seasons of the Italian Championship, winning a total of five national titles.

He retired from football in 1903 at the age of 32.

=== The Palla Dapples ===
After retiring, Dapples created the "Palla Dapples," a prestigious solid silver football-shaped trophy, which was contested among Italian teams for six years.

=== The Challenge Cup – A rediscovered trophy ===
In the 1910s, Genoa entrusted Dapples with the "Challenge Cup," also known as the "Coppa Duca degli Abruzzi," a trophy awarded to the club that won the first three Italian football championships.

After his death, the cup was lost and remained missing until 2018, when it was recovered and put on display at the Genoa Museum and Store.

== Honours ==
=== With Genoa ===
- Italian Football Championship: 5
  - 1898 Italian Football Championship
  - 1899 Italian Football Championship
  - 1900 Italian Football Championship
  - 1902 Italian Football Championship
  - 1903 Italian Football Championship

== Bibliography ==
- Massimo Prati (2019). Gli Svizzeri Pionieri del Football Italiano. Urbone Publishing. ISBN 978-88-32230-02-4.
- Davide Rota (2008). Dizionario illustrato dei giocatori genoani. De Ferrari. ISBN 978-88-6405-011-9.
