= Faustin =

Faustin is a given name and surname. Notable people called Faustin include:

Given name:

- Faustin Baha (born 1982), Tanzanian long-distance runner who specializes in the half marathon and marathon
- Faustin Betbeder, French illustrator, caricaturist and prototypical comics artist
- Faustin Birindwa (1943–1999), Congolese politician
- Faustin Boukoubi (born 1954), Gabonese politician, President of the National Assembly of Gabon
- Faustin Butéra (born 1955), Rwandan sprinter
- Faustin Habineza (born 1959), Rwandan mathematician, educator, politician
- Jean Marie Faustin Godefroid Havelange (1916–2016), Brazilian lawyer, businessman and athlete
- Faustin Hélie (1799–1884), French jurist and a leading reformer of criminal law
- Faustin Herr (1834–1849), Austrian painter, lithographer, and miniaturist
- Faustin Linyekula (born 1974), Congolese dancer, choreographer of contemporary dance
- Faustin Luanga (born 1964), Congolese politician and career diplomat
- Faustin Munene (born 1951), Congolese military officer and politician
- Faustin Musa (born 1981), Tanzanian long-distance runner
- Faustin Ndikumana (born 1970), Burundian economist and anti-corruption activist
- Faustin Ntezilyayo (born 1962), president of the Supreme Court of Rwanda
- Faustin Kayumba Nyamwasa (born 1962), Chief of Staff of the Rwandan Army 1998–2002
- Faustin Rucogoza (died 1994), Rwandan politician and the Minister of Information
- Faustin Senghor (born 1994), Senegalese professional footballer
- Faustin Soulouque (1782–1867), President of Haiti from 1847 to 1849, Emperor of Haiti from 1849 to 1859
- Faustin-Archange Touadéra (born 1957), President of the Central African Republic
- Faustin Twagiramungu (1945–2023), Rwandan politician
- Faustin E. Wirkus (1896–1945), American marine reputedly crowned Faustin II, King of La Gonâve, a Haitian island
- Saints Faustin and Jovita, said to be Christian martyrs under Hadrian

Surname:

- Andy Faustin (born 1997), French-born Haitian footballer
- Gina Faustin (born 1960), Haitian fencer
- Nadine Faustin-Parker (born 1976), Haitian hurdler born in Belgium
- Usengimana Faustin (born 1994), Rwandan professional footballer

Fictional Characters:

- Mikhail Faustin, antagonist in the 2008 videogame GTA IV

== See also ==
- Saint Faustin-Lac-Carre, municipality in the Laurentides region of Quebec, Canada
- Crown of Faustin I, the crown of Faustin Soulouque
- Faust
- Faustianka
- Faustianus
- Faustina (disambiguation)
- Faustini
- Faustino (disambiguation)
- Faustinus
