= Arild Rosenkrantz =

Danish nobleman painter, sculptor, stained glass artist and illustrator

- Born: April 9, 1870; Frederiksborg Castle, Denmark
- Died: September 28, 1964 (aged 94); Kaløvig Hvilehjem nursery, Denmark
- Education: Modesto Faustini, Académie Julian
- Known for: Painter and stained glass artist
- Notable work: Stained glass, paintings, illustrations and sculpture
- Spouse: Louise Augusta (Tessa) Mackenzie

Arild Rosenkrantz (Danish pronunciation: [ˈɑːˌʁilˀ ˈʁoːsn̩ˌkʁɑnˀs]; 9 April 1870 – 28 September 1964) was a Danish nobleman painter, sculptor, stained glass artist and illustrator.

== Early life ==
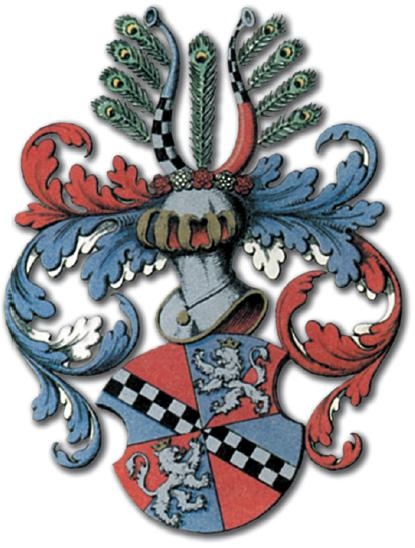
The coat of arm of the noble Danish Rosenkrantz family

Arild Rosenkrantz was born in 1870 to Baron Iver Holger Rosenkrantz, a Danish diplomat, and Julia Louise Mackenzie, a Scottish socialite and spiritualist medium, at Frederiksborg Castle. His father died when Rosenkrantz was only three years old. He accompanied his mother on her journeys to Italy, Scotland and England. She moved to Italy permanently in 1891.

He married Louise Augusta (Tessa) Mackenzie, a Scottish cousin, in 1901.

== Education and career ==
In Rome he studied art under Professor Modesto Faustini in 1887; Faustini imparted an appreciation for the Italian masters that influenced Rosenkrantz's work. There was a dreamy, emotional quality to his work throughout his artistic career as a painter and stained glass artist. Two years later he studied under Jean-Paul Laurens and Benjamin Constant at the Académie Julian in Paris. He was also influenced by the Pre-Raphaelites, painters of the French salon, Romantic artists J. M. W. Turner and William Blake and Impressionist artist Claude Monet.

He was studying in the United States in 1894 and 1895 and made glasswork for Tiffany. Later he made stained glass windows in a wide range of English churches and mansions.

From 1898 he stayed in London, where he developed his reputation as an artist. In London, Rosenkrantz joined the Anthroposophic Society. In 1912 he met Austrian philosopher Rudolf Steiner personally. Two years later he and his wife moved to Dornach, Switzerland to participate in the decoration of the anthroposophical center Goetheanum with other artists. Steiner, who taught Rosenkrantz of colors intrinsic properties, said: "Colours are the soul of nature and the entire cosmos – and we become part of that soul when we live with the colours".

Rosenkrantz returned to London with his wife after Steiner died in 1925. He then took up several artistic pursuits for Anthroposophic theatres: he designed costumes, created stage decorations and decorated the interior of 2 theatres. He also worked as a teacher and held annual exhibitions.

Rosenkrantz is

one of those versatile, highly-trained artistic personalities that turns readily to the plastic arts and find in almost any one of them a means for self-expression. In the case of Baron Rosenkrantz an instinctive feeling for design, a power of selection and arrangement of form that naturally ensure interesting composition, are supplemented by a gift for colour and a love of it in rich forms. This latter trait has to some extent shaped his artistic destiny and led him to the designing of stained-glass windows. In this form of art he also finds a legitimate channel for expressing the sentiment of religious tradition... He reverences the traditional sentiment of this art which has voiced Christianity; he carefully studies its methods and its crafts, but he is willing to benefit by the processes of modern glass manufacturer and that appreciation of harmonised colour which in modern years has been evolved in the art.

— H. Field, The International Studio.

== Later years ==
Rosenkrantz came to Denmark in the fall of 1939 to organize an exhibition in Copenhagen for his 70th birthday on 9 April 1940. However, German troops crossed over the Danish border and returning to London was impossible. His relatives at Rosenholm Castle in Jutland offered their home to Rosenkrantz and his wife, who then died in 1944. After that, he decided to stay in Denmark at the East Jutland castle. He worked more than 20 additional years creating works, exhibiting them, and lecturing.

Influenced by anthroposophy through Rudolf Steiner and theories by Goethe, Rosenkrantz's works reflected a bold use of color. The Rosenholm Castle holds a number of his oil paintings and pastels.

He died in September 1964.

== Works ==
Stained Glass

He made stained glass windows for churches, houses and castles while he lived in England.

- Cadogan Hall, Chelsea, London. Built as a Church of Christ Scientist in 1907.
- St Andrew's east window, Wickhambreaux, Kent; it was made in John LaFarge's New York studio This window was fabricated by The Decorative Stained Glass Company in 1896, 11 years after the John LaFarge Studio was dissolved.
- A church in Tasmania and Juelsminde Church in Denmark have his work.
- Holy Trinity's east window, Churchover, Warwickshire
- Four windows in St. Nicholas, Taplow, Buckinghamshire Stained Glass of Buckinghamshire Churches
- Southwick Church of Scotland Parish Church in Kirkcudbrightshire. Late 19th century stained glass window for the McTaggart-Stewart family of Southwick House.

Paintings and illustrations

Examples of his works include:

- Cupid and Psyche, the symbolist paintings, 1896, Rosenholm Castle, Denmark
- The Tempter, 1896, Rosenholm Castle, Denmark
- The Duchess of Grafton, a portrait of his cousin, 1905, Rosenholm Castle, Denmark
- The Omnipresent, 1907, Rosenholm Castle, Denmark
- Royal Academy of Music paintings, before 1911, Royal Academy of Music, London
- Tales of Mystery and Adventure illustrations for Edgar Allan Poe's Danish edition.
- Golgotha
- The Last Supper
- The Hierophant
- Madonna
- Michael
- Wisdom
- The Messenger
- Series of four pictures from the Creation: The Mineral World, The Plant World, The Animal World and Man – and The Seven Apocalyptic Seals.

Sculpture

- Bronze Christ figure for St George's Camberwell, London.

== Publications ==
- Baron Arild Rosenkrantz. (1967). A new impulse in art. New Knowledge.
- Arild Rosenkrantz : de syv segl / - Randers, Randers Kunstmuseum, 1988.
- Baron Rosenkrantz: Farvernes mystic / redaktør: Christian Gether ... [et al.]; bidrag: Lisa Sjølander Andresen ... [et al.]. - Ishøj, Arken, 2020.
- Arild Rosenkrantz: "Vejen gennem livet" / Autobiography, udgivet 2020. Redigeret af Jette Arendrup
- Arild Rosenkrantz: "Arild Rosenkrantz i engelske kirker" / Stained glass windows. Troels Andersen
- The last three can be bought at the gallery at Rosenholm Slot, or at www.arss.dk

"Arild Rosenkrantz Samlingens Støtteforening" www.arss.dk exhibits a large collection of the artists works at Rosenholm Slot

== Exhibitions ==
His exhibitions included:

- Sar Peladan's "Salon de la Rose+Croix" in between 1892 and 1894.
- Exhibitions in Copenhagen
- Exhibitions in London
  - Tales of Mystery and Adventure illustrations for Edgar Allan Poe's Danish edition were exhibited in 1909.
  - Annual exhibitions between about 1925 and 1939
- "Gold & Magic" exhibition at Arken, Danish museum of contemporary art, October 3, 2020-May 2021
