= Faustini =

Faustini is an Italian surname. Notable people with the surname include:

- Andrea Faustini (born 1994), Italian singer and finalist in the eleventh series of the UK The X Factor in 2014
- Arnaldo Faustini (1872–1944), Italian polar geographer, writer and cartographer
- Giovanni Faustini (1615–1651), Italian librettist and opera impresario. Brother of Marco Faustini
- Marco Faustini (1606-1676), Italian theatrical impresario. Brother of Giovanni Faustini
- Modesto Faustini (1839–1891), Italian painter
- Osvaldo Faustini (born 1956), Italian former long-distance runner

== See also ==
- Faustini (crater), a lunar crater that lies near the south pole of the Moon
