= Faustino =

Faustino may refer to:

- Faustino (name), including a list of people with the name
- Faustino, an ape in the Kasakela chimpanzee community
- Faustino M. Parera, a village in Entre Ríos, Argentina
- Bodegas Faustino vineyard in the Rioja region of Spain, and wines produced from this vineyard

== See also ==
- Faustina (disambiguation)
