= Faustin Hélie =

French jurist (1799–1884)

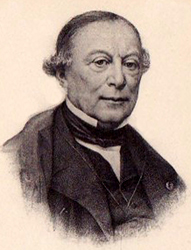
Faustin Hélie

Faustin Hélie (31 May 1799 – 22 October 1884) was a French jurist and a leading reformer of criminal law.

Born in Nantes and an official in the French Ministry of Justice since 1823, after the Revolution of 1848 Hélie became a judge with the Court of Cassation in 1849. In 1872, he became the president of its criminal chamber, and was briefly Vice President of the State Council.

Hélie was influential in reforming the codes and practice of criminal law in France, and, guided by a humanitarian impetus, sought to protect the weak against injustices arising from criminal proceedings. Although some of his proposals appeared too advanced for their time, they all found adherents.

In 1849 Hélie was member of a legislative commission reforming the judicial constitution, and in 1878 he headed a commission to reform the criminal code and procedure. His principal works include the 1834 Théorie du code pénal (with Adolphe Chauveau), the first work to give French criminal law a genuine dogmatic structure, and his 1845 Traité de l'instruction criminelle, which sought to limit the judge's prerogatives to the benefit of the rights of the accused.

Hélie was made a member of the Legion of Honour in 1839, and an officer in 1859. A street in Paris and Nantes and a place in Nantes are named after him.
