= Bodegas Faustino =

Vineyard in Spain

Coordinates: 42°29′27″N 2°26′08″W

The Bodegas Faustino vineyard is located in Spain within the province of Alava in the Basque Country. It is only 5 km (3 miles) from Logroño, the capital of La Rioja, and is included in the Rioja wine-producing region.

== History ==
The Bodegas Faustino vineyard was established in 1861 by Eleuterio Martinez Arzok when he purchased the palace and vineyards of the Marques del Pierto. The objective was to make wine and sell it in bulk and over following years it steadily grew in size and quality. In 1930 Faustino Martinez Perez de Albeniz took over and was the first to bottle his wine within the region of Rioja. The names of the wines produced reflected the vineyard of origin. For example: Campillo, Parrita, Famar, and Santana. However this was soon abandoned, only to return 60 years later after the company introduced some single-vineyard wines. Then in 1957, Julio Faustino Martinez (Third generation) became head of the company and launched Faustino as an international brand, which today is sold in as many as 47 countries.

== Vineyards ==
The vineyards of Bodegas Faustino are located in Logrono, Laguardia, Mendavia and Oyon within the Spanish wine region of Rioja. This is about 650ha (1,600 acres). The main grapes used for the production of wines within the vineyards being the Tempranillo, Mazuelo, Graciano, and Viura grapes. These grape varietals are typical within the region. The winery can hold about 50,000 oak barrels and there is a permanent stock of some 9 million bottles.

== Ownership ==
This vineyard is still a family-owned business and has expanded to become Grupo Faustino. Other than Faustino itself, the company includes Campillo and Marques de Vitoria also in Rioja; Valcarlos in Navarra; Condesa de Leganza in La Mancha; Bodegas Portia in Ribera del Duero; and Bodegas Victorianas, which offers varietal table wine from across Spain.

== Wines ==
=== Bottles ===
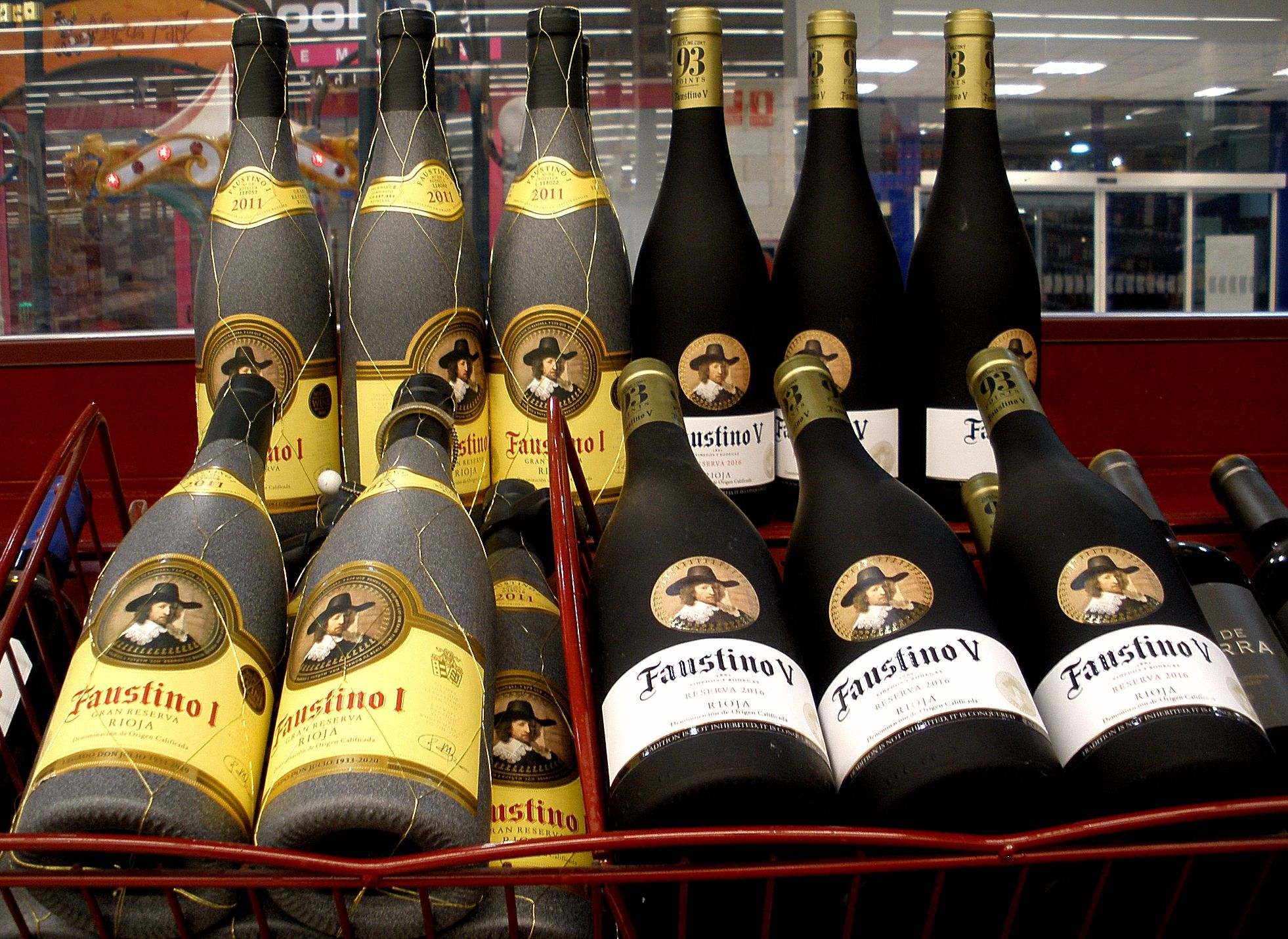
Typical Bodegas Faustino bottles

The wines of Bodegas Faustino are presented usually in a Burgundy style bottle with a label bearing the portrait of Nicolaes van Bambeeck, by Rembrandt. The Gran Reserva bottles also are wrapped with a thin, twisted-gold-wire mesh.

=== Styles of wine ===
From the very beginning the traditional style of wine production was the hallmark of wines produced by Bodegas Faustino. However thanks to pressure of market demand at the end of the 20th century this was abandoned, resulting in the production of a more modern range of wines such as Faustino Crianza Selección de Familia and Faustino de Autor, plus some limited editions like 9 Mil (so called since only 9,000 litres were produced) and Faustino Edición Especial, produced to celebrate Julio Faustino Martinez first vinification some 50 years previously. The range of wines include red, white, and rosado.

=== Classification of wines ===
Wines produced at Bodegas Faustino vineyards are all called Faustino and are always followed by a Roman numeral: The top level of wines have the Roman numeral I. The middle range Faustinos have the Roman numeral V and the entry level Faustinos have the Roman numerals VII. Then lastly there is the crianza, reserva, or gran reserva. Cava is also produced, however this is usually associated with the wine growing region of Catalonia, although has been known to be produced in other wine regions such as Rioja. Such wines includes Cava Brut Reserva, Cava Extra Seco, Cava Semi Seco, and Cava Rosado (rose).

== See also ==
- Rioja (wine)
