= Modesto Faustini =

Italian painter

- Born: 27 May 1839; Brescia, Italy
- Died: 1891 (aged 51–52); Rome, Italy
- Notable work: St Francis of Assisi; The Love of the Angels; Saints Cecilia, Caterina, and Lucia

Modesto Faustini (27 May 1839 – 1891) was an Italian painter.

Faustini was born in Brescia. He was initially trained as a carpenter in the orphanage of Brescia, but then was able to win a scholarship at the Brera Academy where he studied under Tosio Martinengo. In 1869, he was awarded a stipend from the Brescia Town Council and moved to Rome.

Faustini painted mostly religious scenes. His most prominent works are St Francis of Assisi (1877); The Love of the Angels (1875); and a painting of Saints Cecilia, Caterina and Lucia (c. 1863).

In Milan he painted two medallions under the portico of Palazzo Brera. His paintings are also present in the Pacheco Chapel in Buenos Aires and the Spanish Chapel in the Basilica of the Holy House in Loreto.

Faustini died in Rome in 1891.

== Gallery ==
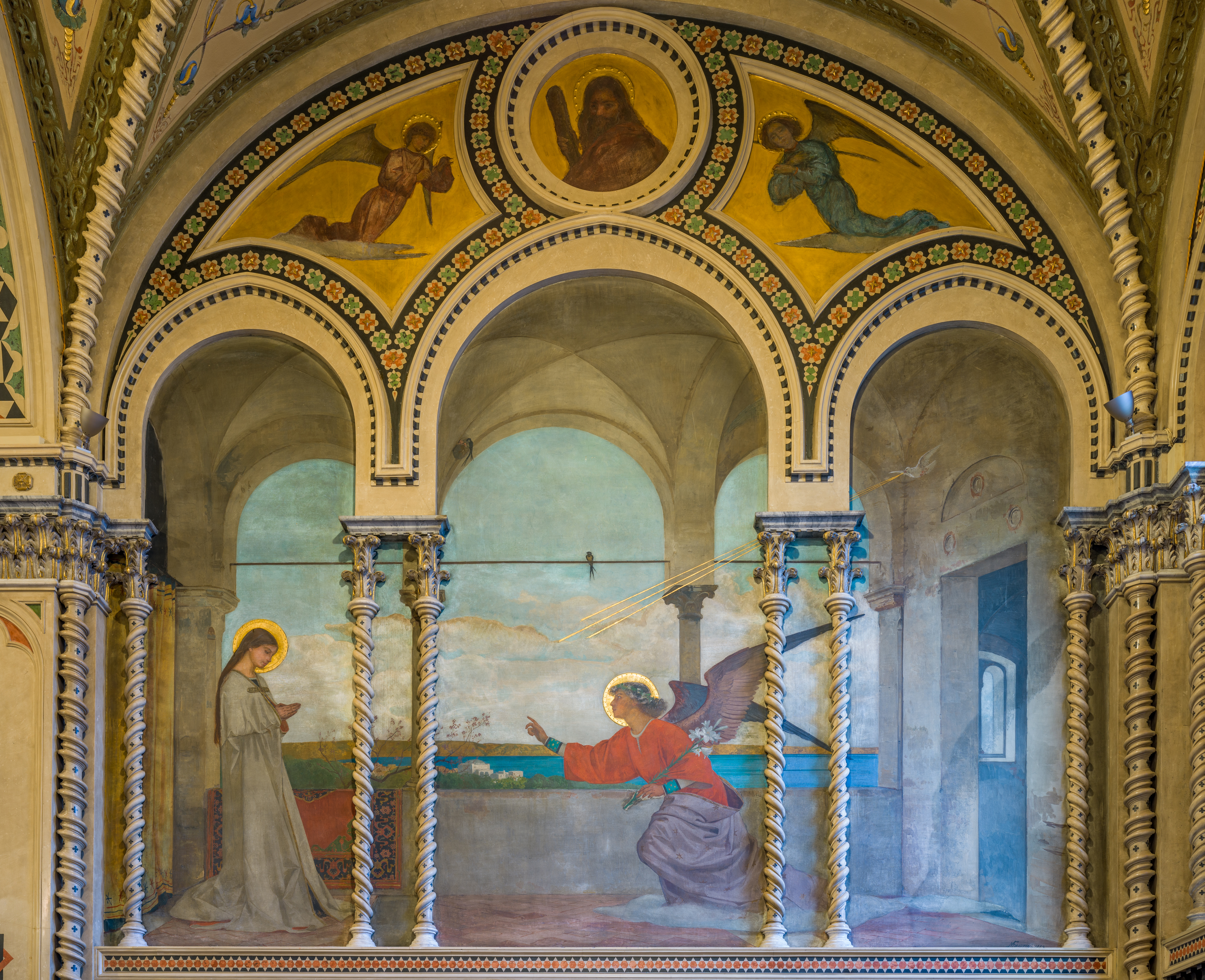
Annunciazione

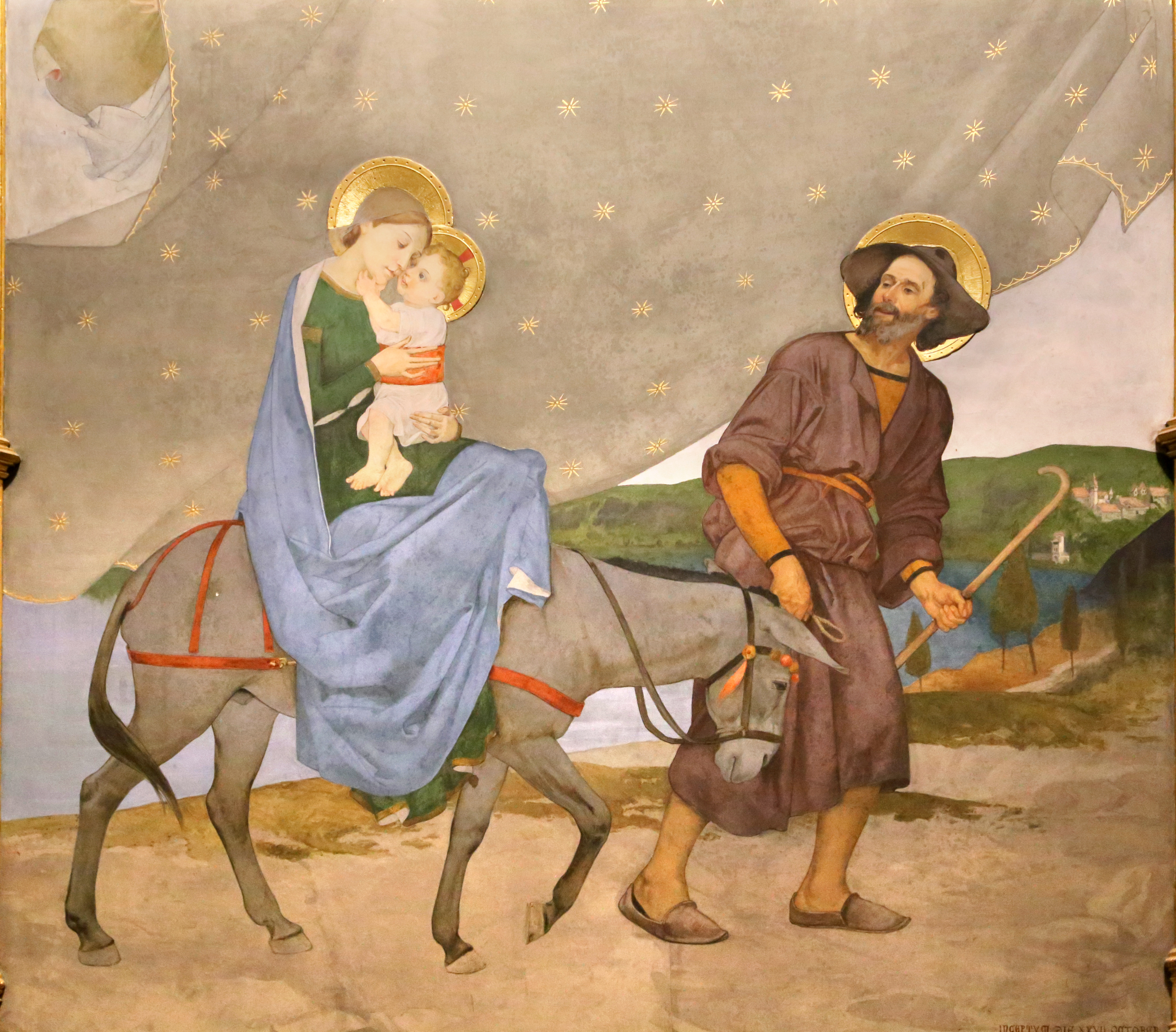
Fuga in Egitto

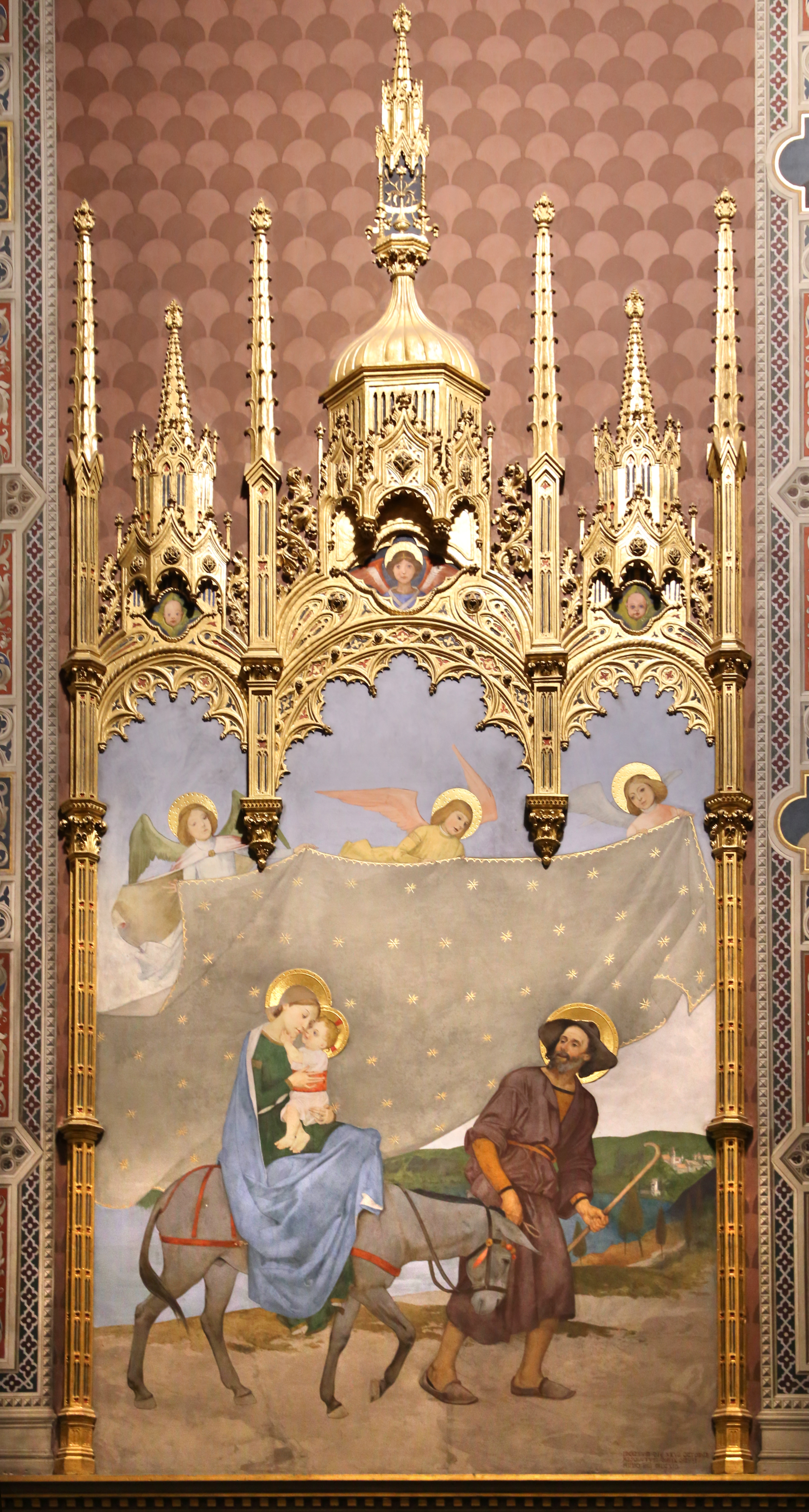
Flight into Egypt

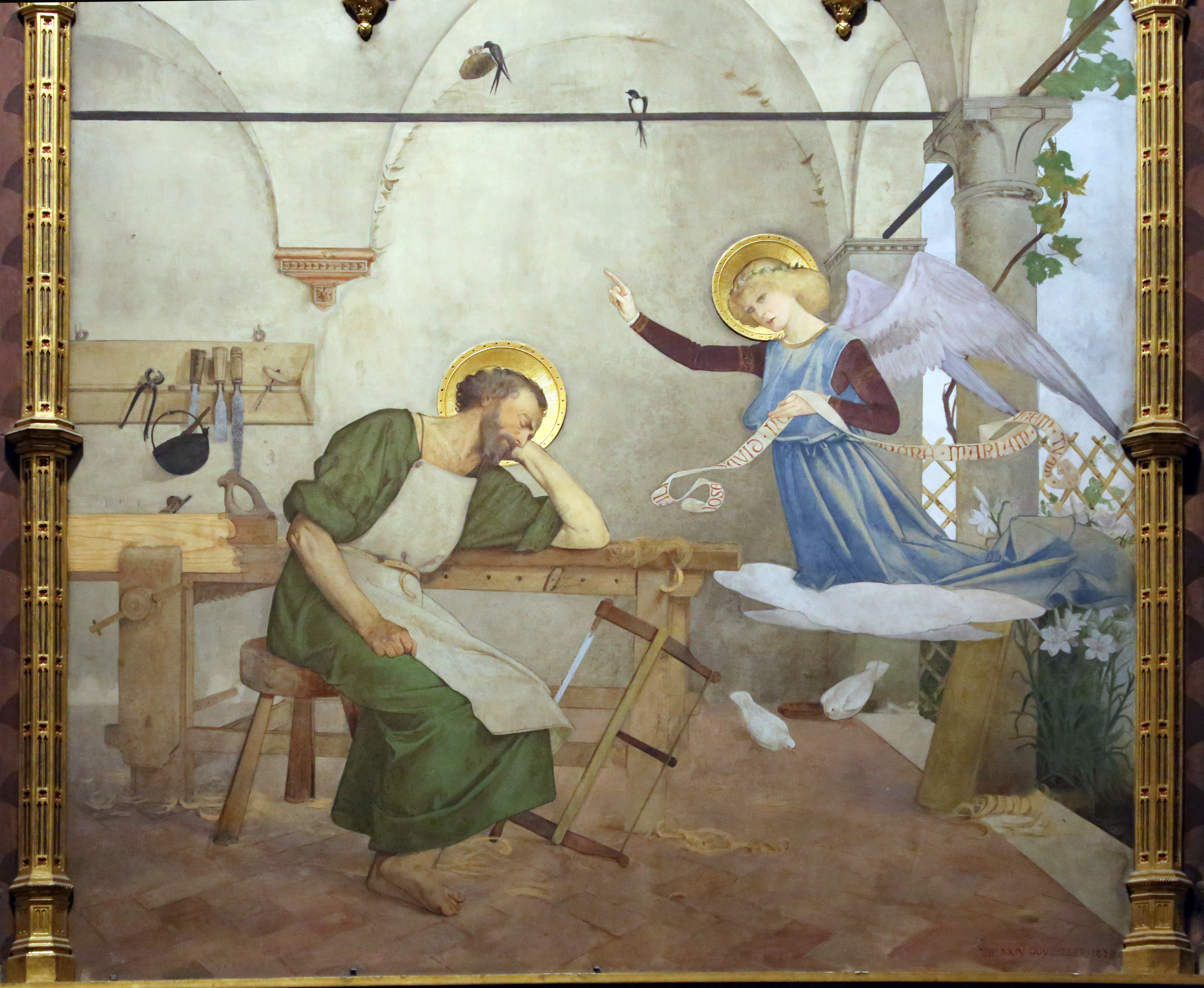
Sogno di Giuseppe

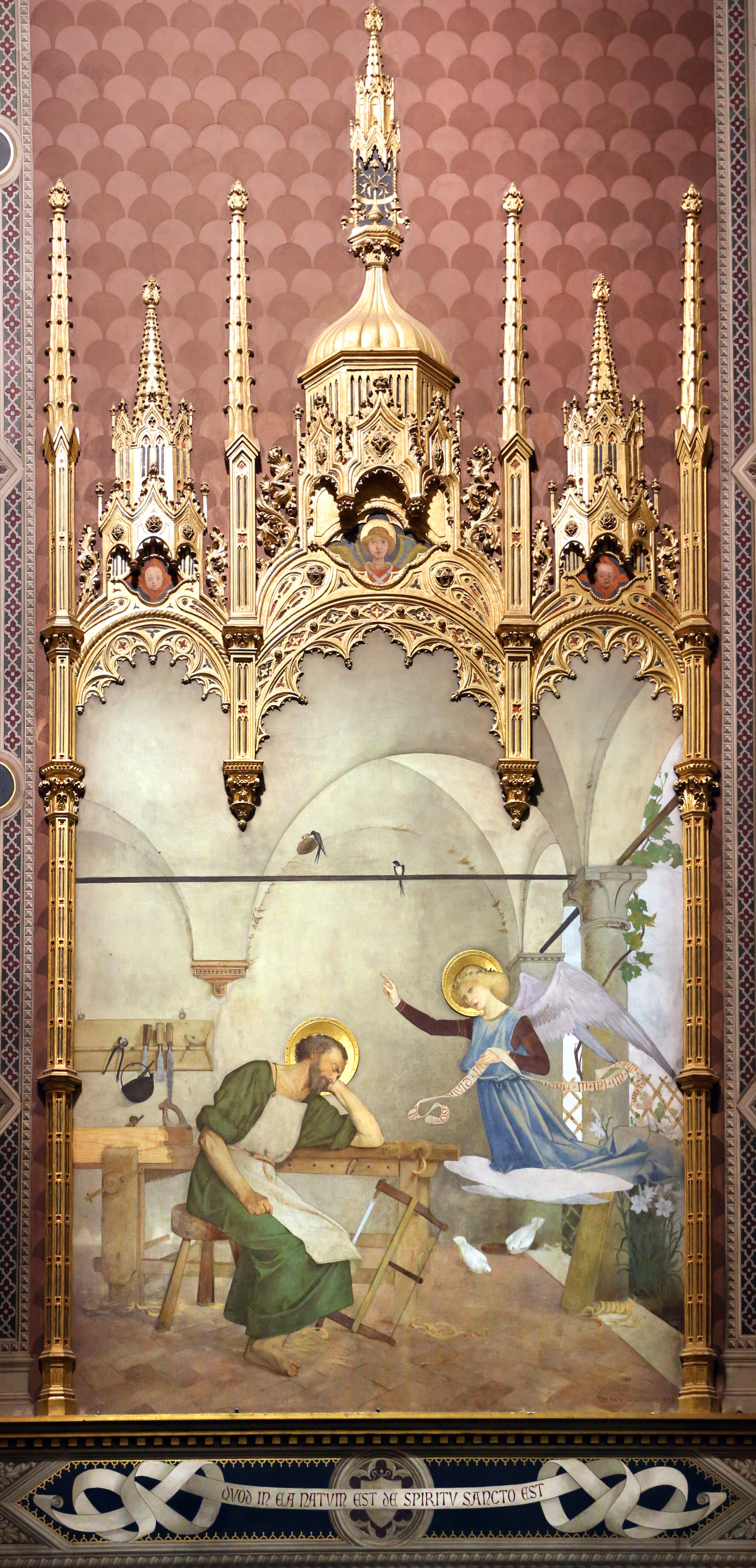
Joseph's Dream

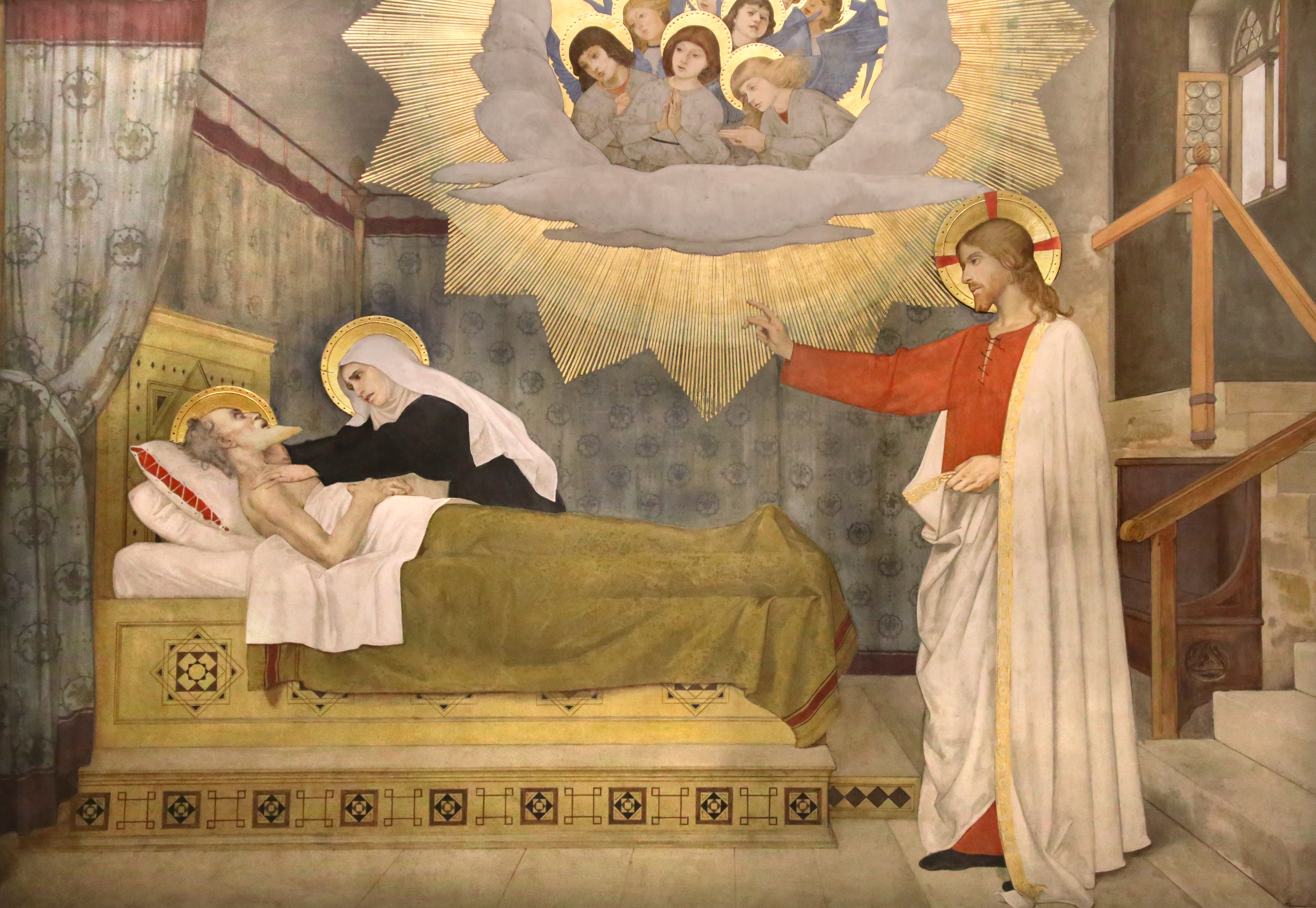
Morte di Giuseppe

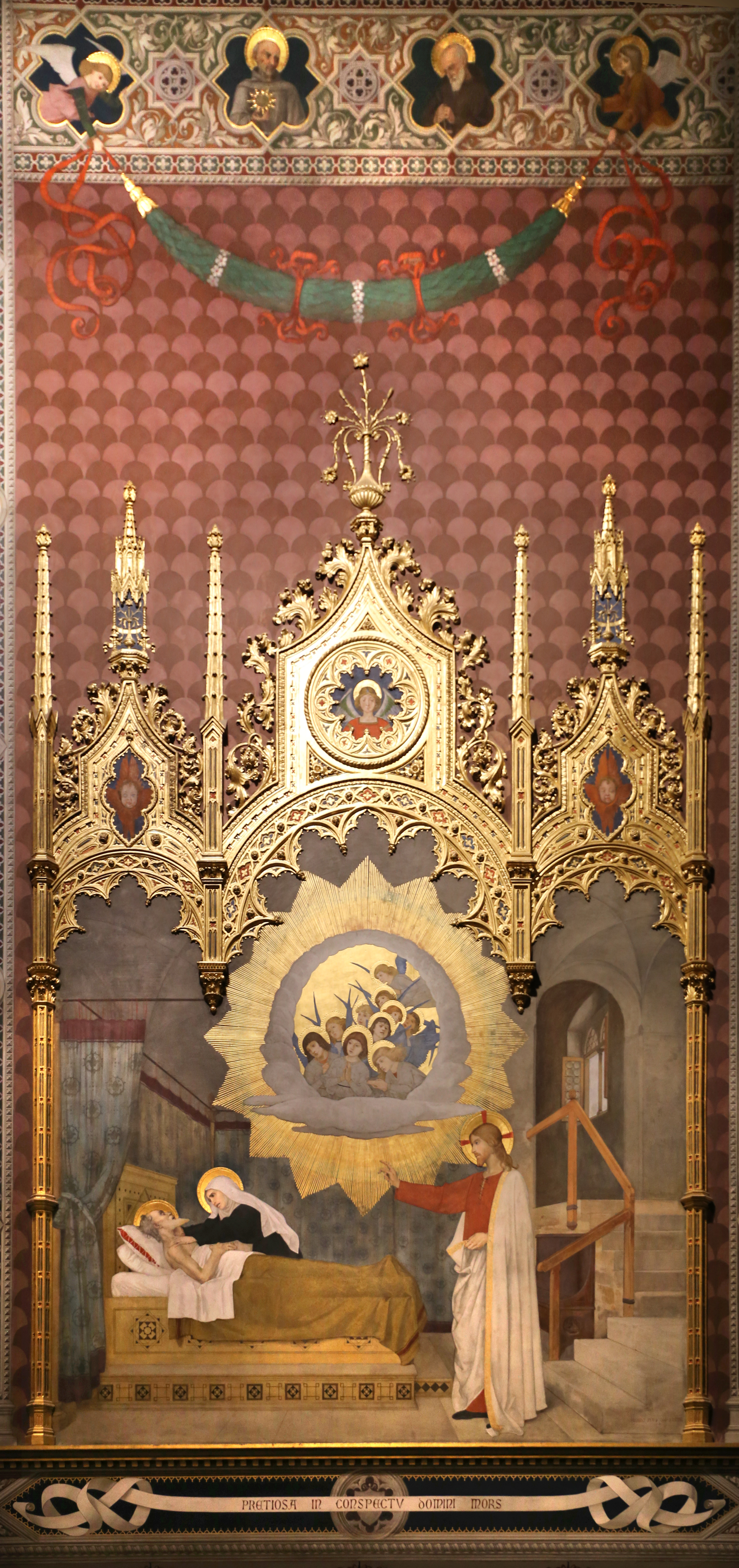
Death of Joseph

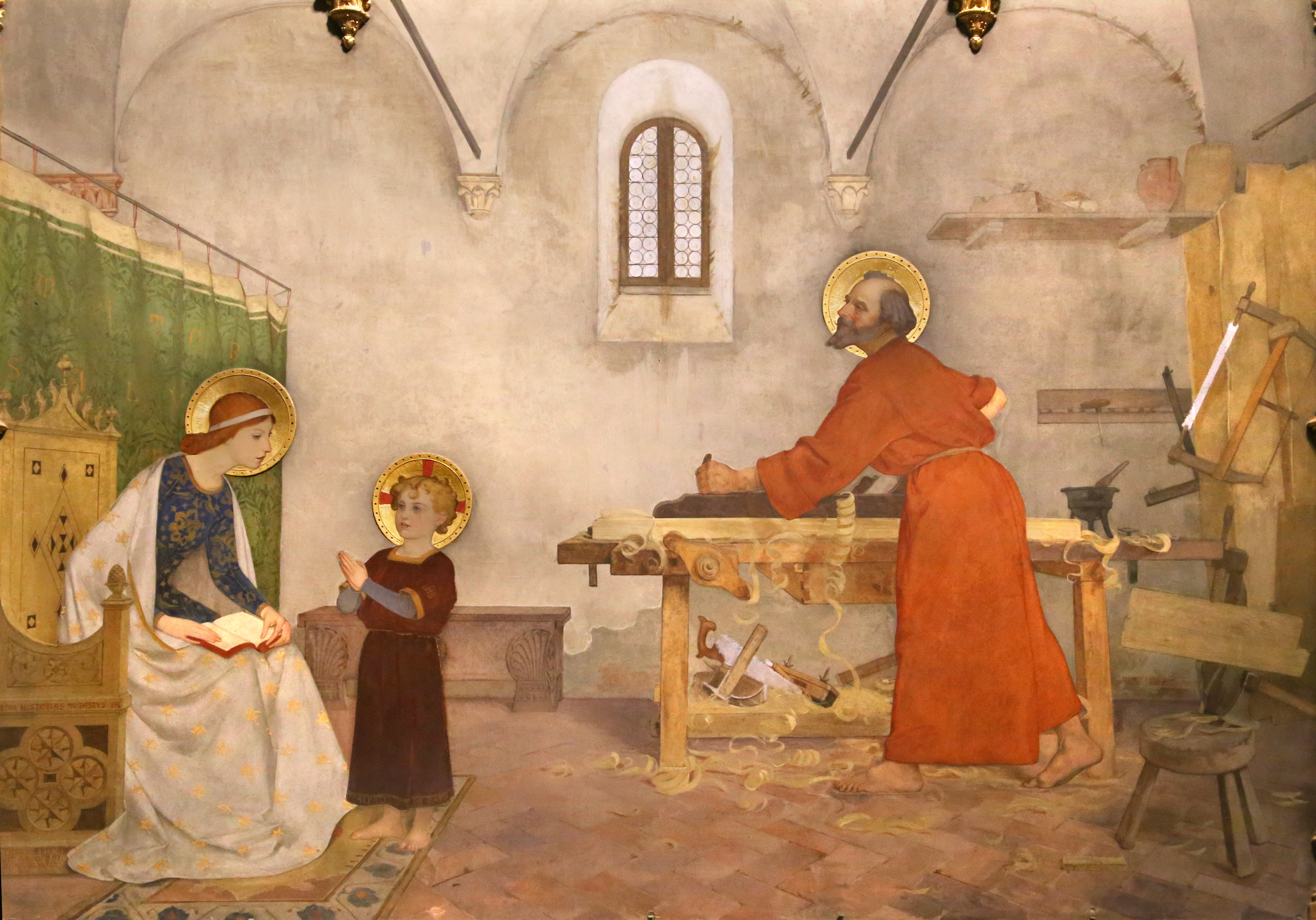
Bottega di Giuseppe Falegname con Maria e Gesù Bambino

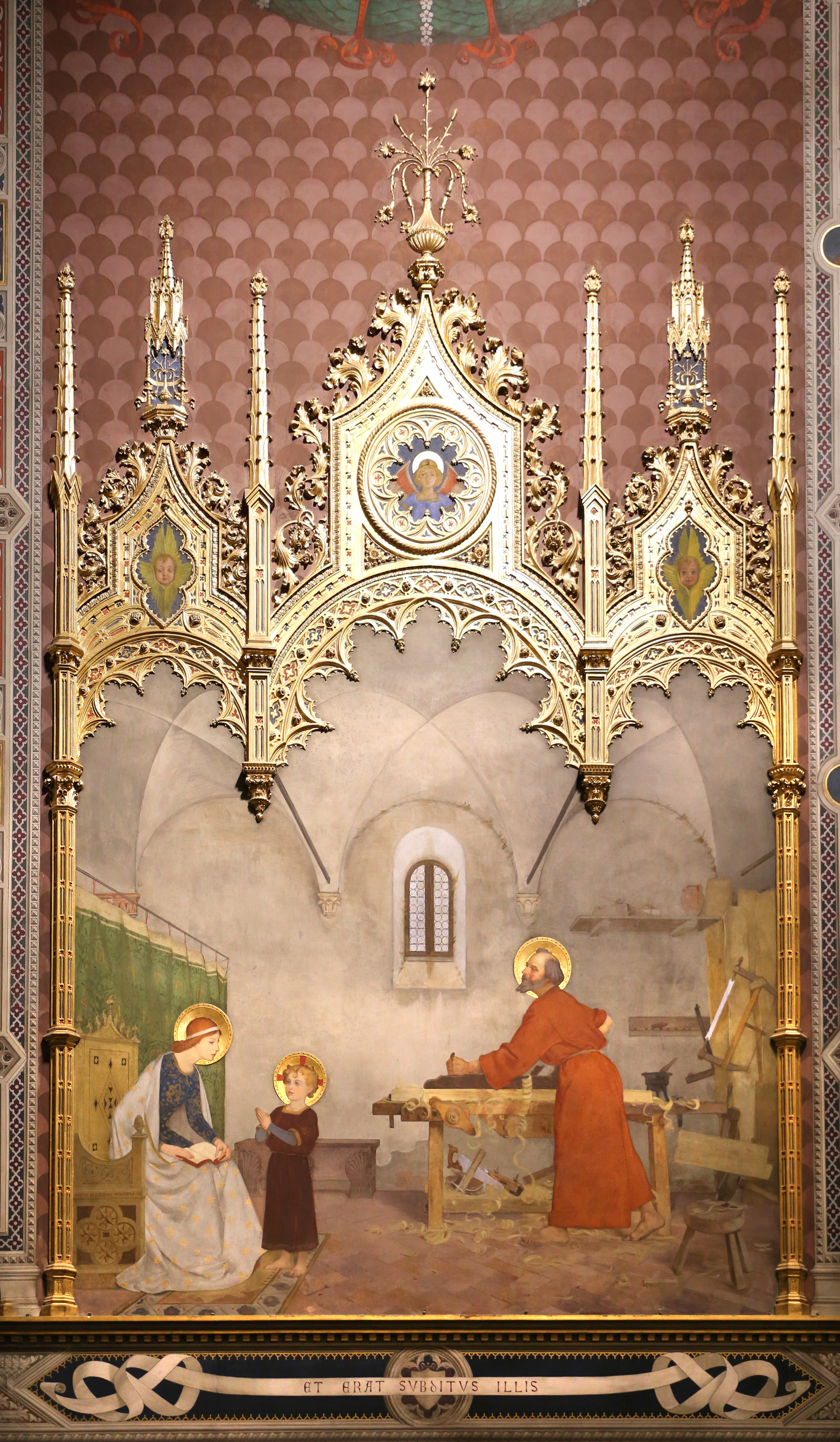
Workshop of Joseph the Carpenter with Mary and Baby Jesus

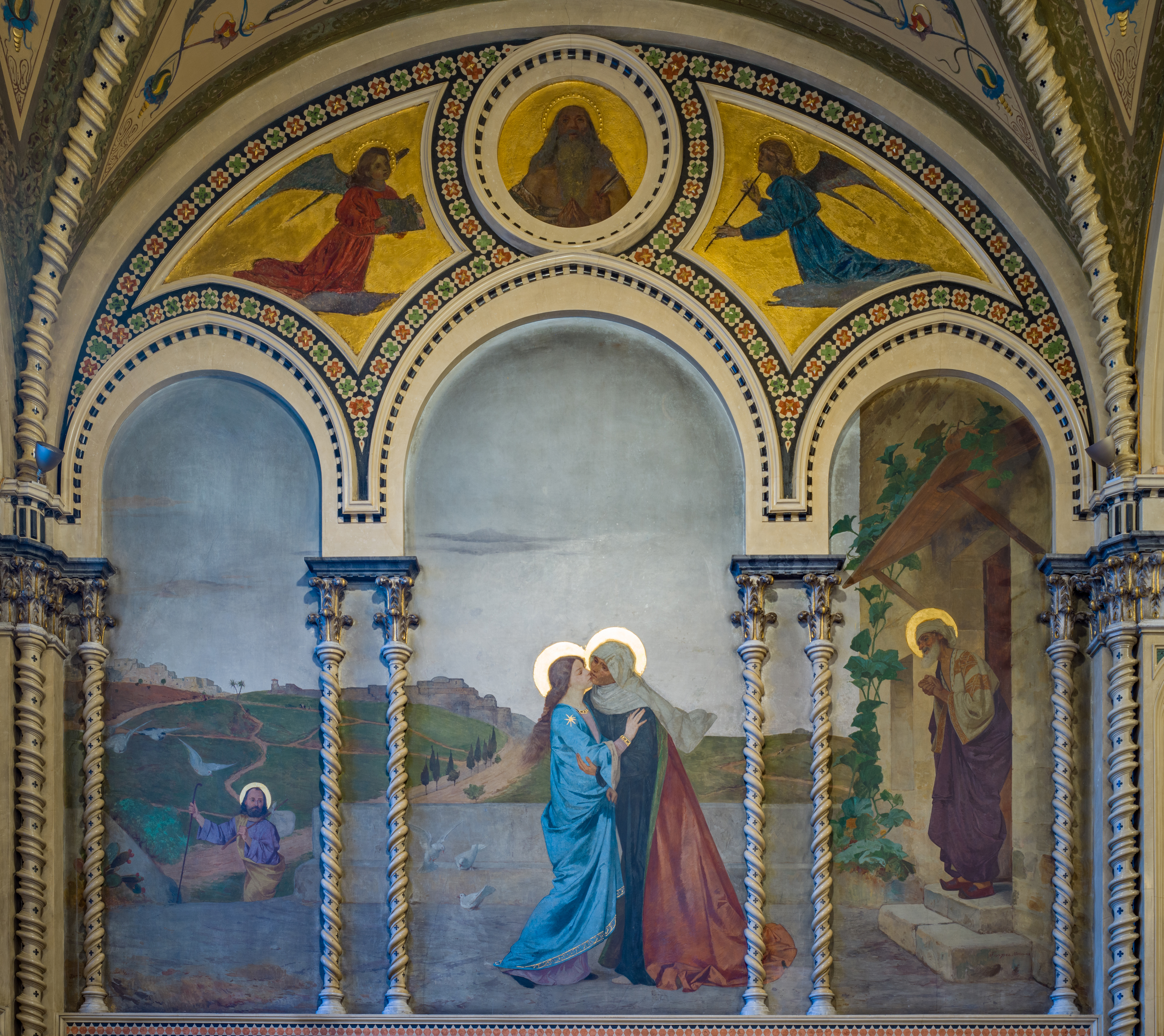
Visitazione
