= Funiculaire Lausanne-Signal =

Former funicular railway in Lausanne, Switzerland

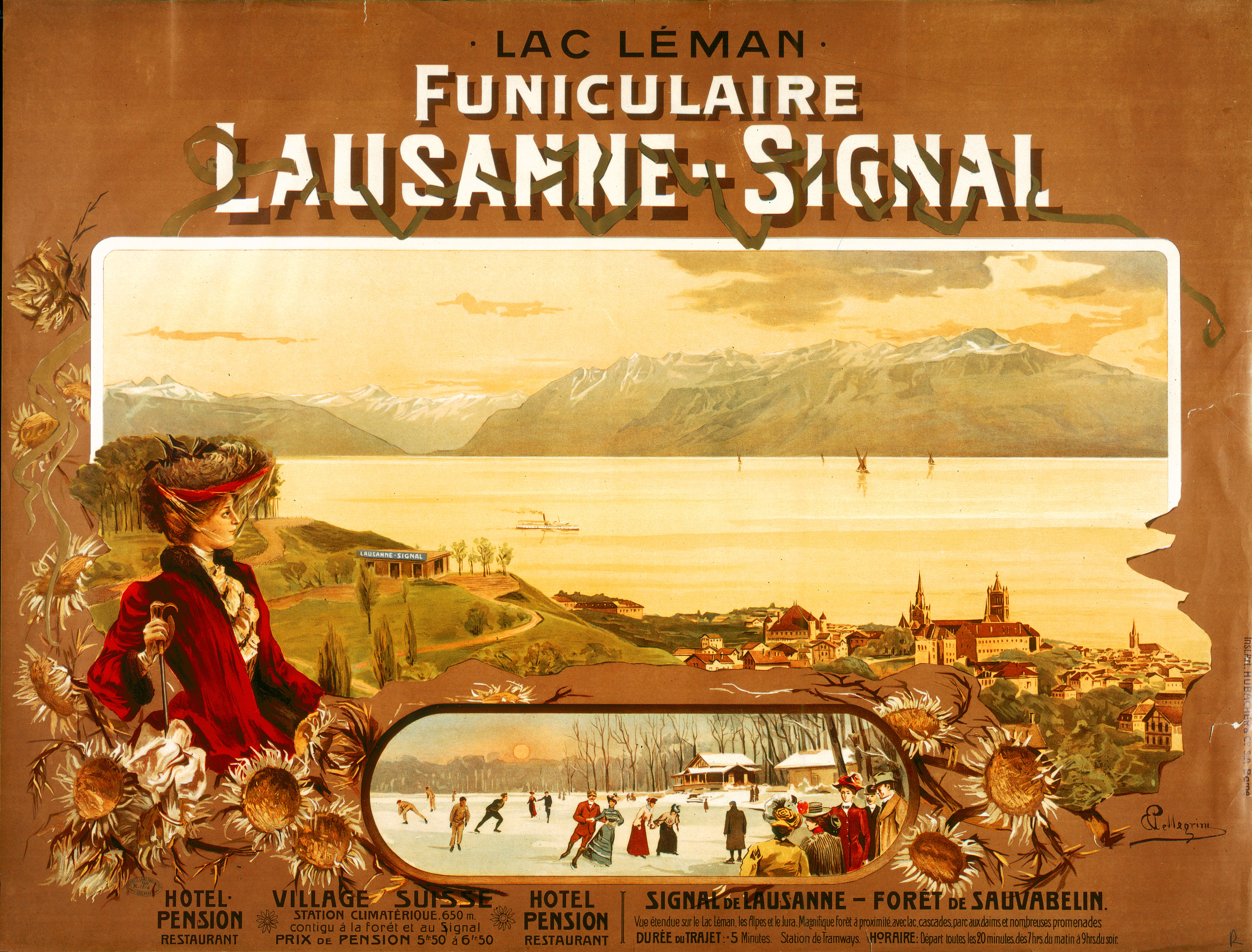

Overview
- Other name: Funiculaire du Signal
- Status: Ceased operation
- Owner: Compagnie du chemin de fer du Lausanne-Signal
- Locale: Lausanne; Switzerland
- Termini: Lausanne (Vallon); Signal
- Stations: 2

Service
- Type: Funicular
- Rolling stock: 2 for 50 persons each

History
- Opened: 14:08, 18 October 1899
- Closed: 31 October 1948

Technical
- Number of tracks: 1 with passing loop
- Track gauge: 1,000 mm (3 ft 3 3/8 in)
- Electrification: 1903
- Highest elevation: 564 m (1,850 ft)
- Maximum incline: 28%

The Funiculaire Lausanne-Signal (lit. 'Lausanne–Signal Funicular') was a funicular railway in Lausanne, Switzerland. The line led from Vallon near the old town at 450 m to the viewpoint Signal de Sauvabelin at 564 m. It had a length of 467 m with a difference of elevation of 114 m and a maximum inclination of 28%. The funicular with two cars had a single track with a passing loop, a tunnel of 135 m just below the upper station, and a viaduct of 127 m. It opened on 18 October 1899, a few years after the Lac de Sauvabelin had been built. Two generators at the upper station powered the line until electrification in 1903.

The line closed in 1948.

In 2005, remains of the line are still visible: lower station building, stone arches of the viaduct and parts of the tunnel. The lower portion of the tunnel is partially accessible.
