= La Cité =

La Cité may refer to:

- La Cité-Limoilou, central borough of Quebec City
- La Cité (Lausanne), a district of the city of Lausanne, in Switzerland
- La Cité, former French town, today part of Coulounieix-Chamiers
- La Cité collégiale, nicknamed and now officially branded as La Cité
- La Cité, the French-language title of the 2010 Canadian film, City of Shadows
- Collège La Cité, a French-language college in Ottawa, Ontario, Canada
