= Tour de Sauvabelin =

Tower in Switzerland

Coordinates: 46°32′07″N 6°38′19″E

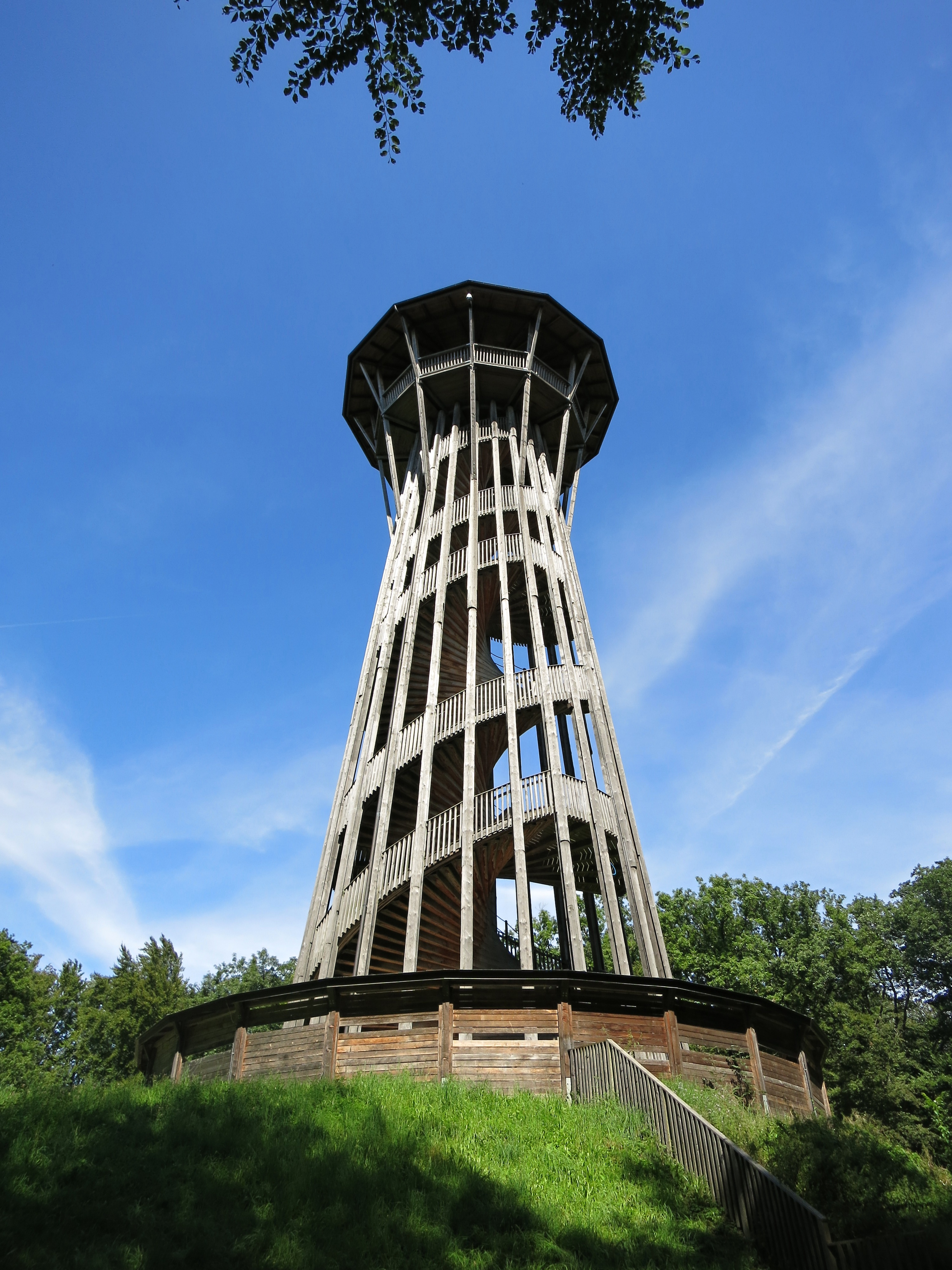
The Tour de Sauvabelin (2014).

The Tour de Sauvabelin (literally "Tower of Sauvabelin") is a wooden tower located in the Sauvabelin forest in Lausanne, Switzerland.

The tower was built in 2003 by Julius Natterer and stands 35 meters high . It offers a panoramic view of the city of Lausanne, Lake Léman, and the surrounding countryside and mountains.

== Story ==
In the 1980s, EPFL professor Julius Natterer tasked his students with developing various construction designs for a tower. In a motion and an interpellation in 1994 and 1996, city councillor Pierre Payot proposed that the observation tower be constructed using wood sourced directly from Lausanne's forests. To avoid unnecessary felling of trees, logs and squared timber were used, partly from dying Douglas firs for the exterior and fir and spruce for the interior. The project was approved by the city council on July 2, 1996, and the building permit was granted to the client, the Union des sociétés de développement de Lausanne (USDL), on March 12, 1998.

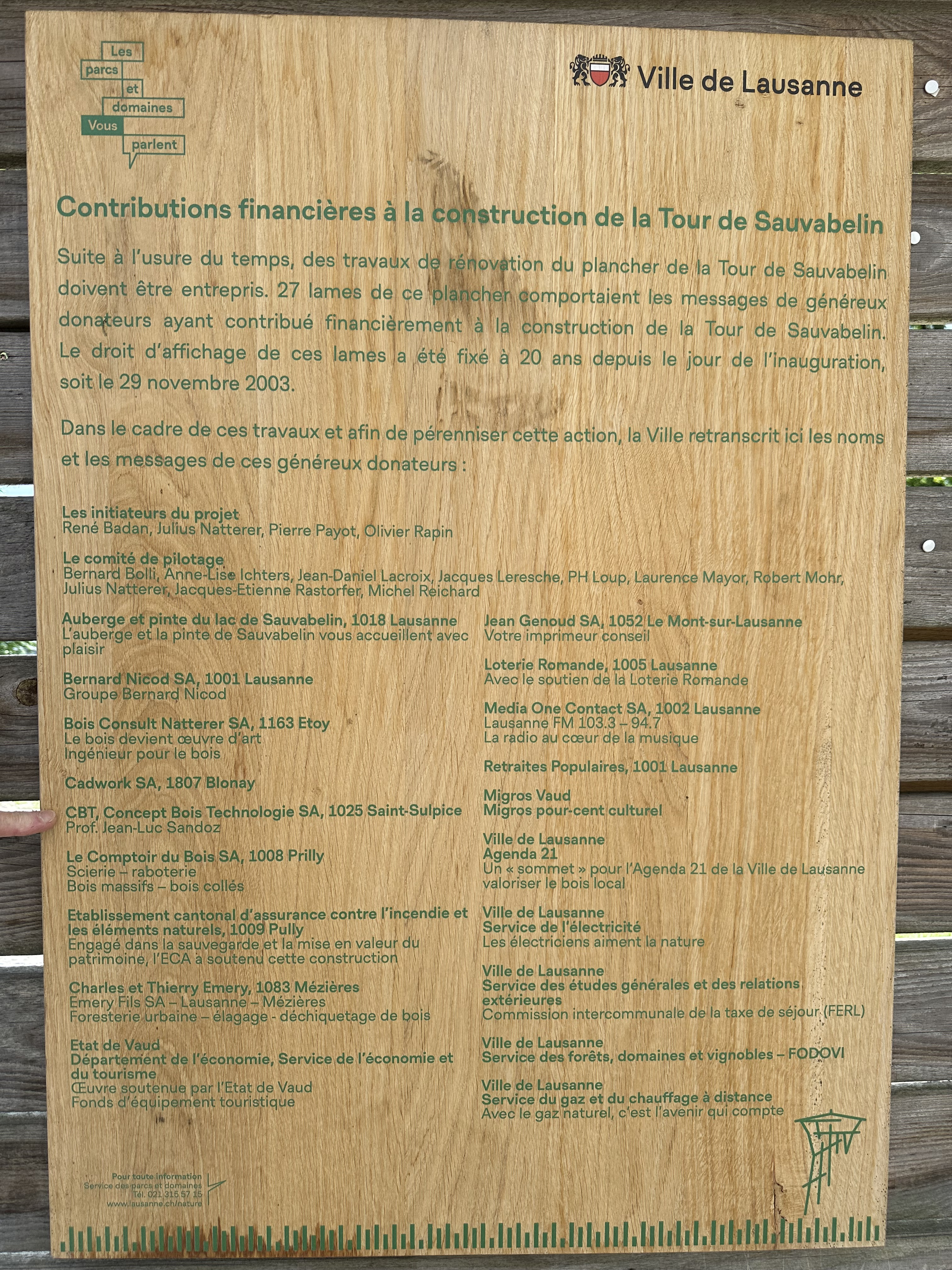
Tower contributors

The majority of the approximately 1.19 million Swiss francs in construction costs were financed by sponsors. Anyone could contribute financially by purchasing stair treads; one cost 1,000 francs for private individuals, and 3,000 francs for companies. In return, each landing was inscribed with the sponsor's name.

The tower was completed on November 29, 2003, and has been open to the public since December 15, 2003. Access is automatically controlled by a revolving gate, which closes during bad weather or after opening hours. For safety reasons, the maximum number of people allowed at any given time is limited to 50.

== See also ==
- Lac de Sauvabelin
- Spiral stairs
