= Lac de Sauvabelin =

Lake in Lausanne, Switzerland

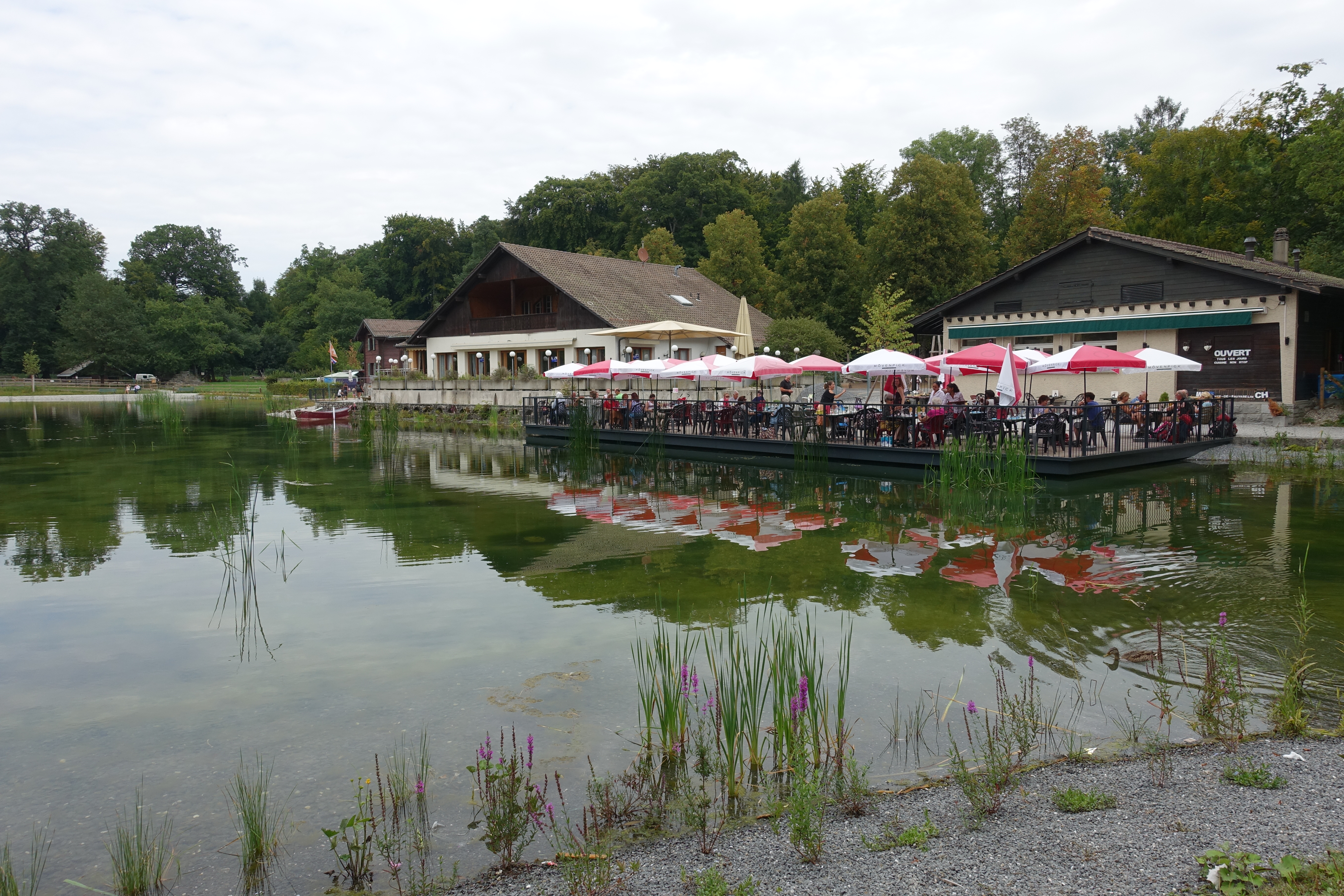
- The chalet

- Location within Canton of Vaud Location within Switzerland Location within Alps
- Interactive map of Lac de Sauvabelin
- Location: Lausanne, Vaud
- Coordinates: 46°32′15″N 6°38′18″E
- Basin countries: Switzerland
- Max. length: 150 m (490 ft)
- Max. width: 100 m (330 ft)
- Max. depth: 1.5 m (4 ft 11 in)
- Surface elevation: 640 m (2,100 ft)
- Islands: 1

The Lac de Sauvabelin (French pronunciation: [lak d(ə) sovab(ə)lɛ̃]; lit. 'Lake of Sauvabelin') is an artificial lake in the Sauvabelin forest above Lausanne, Switzerland.

The City of Lausanne authorised the construction of the lake in 1888, which opened in 1889. A few years later, the Funiculaire Lausanne-Signal was built.

== Gallery ==
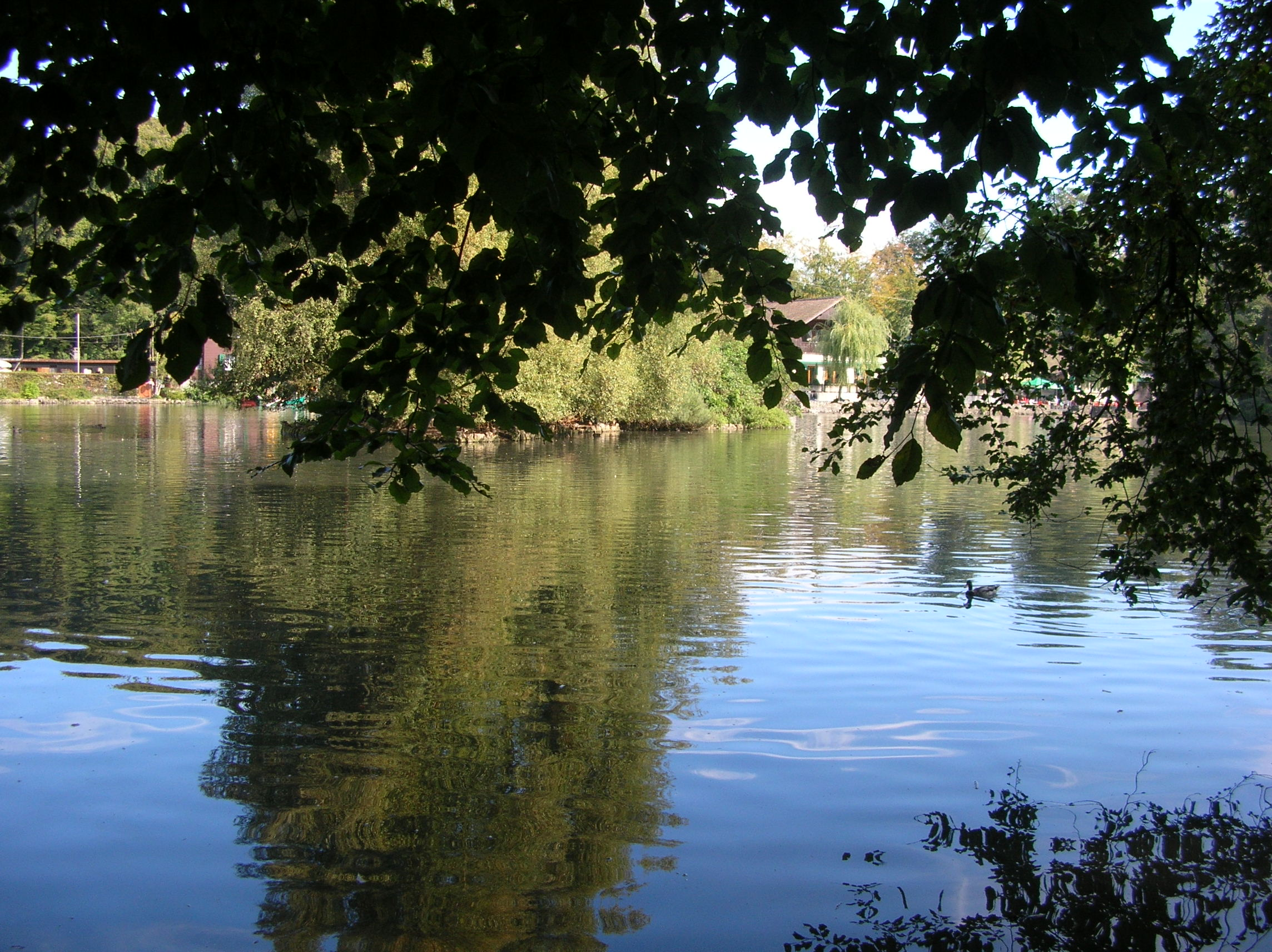

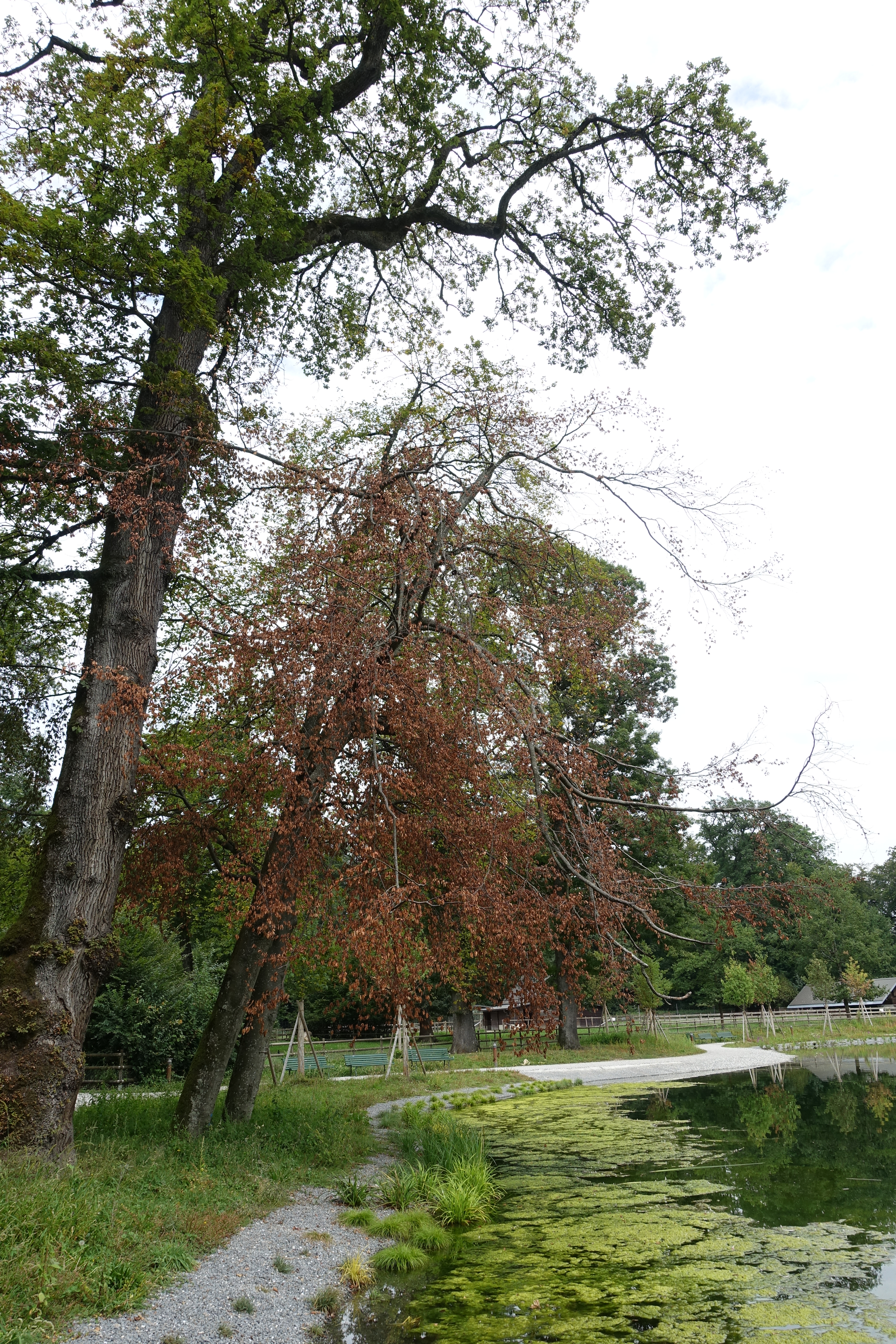

== See also ==
- Sauvabelin Tower
- List of lakes in Switzerland
