= La Cité (Lausanne) =

Coordinates: 46°31′28″N 6°37′36″E

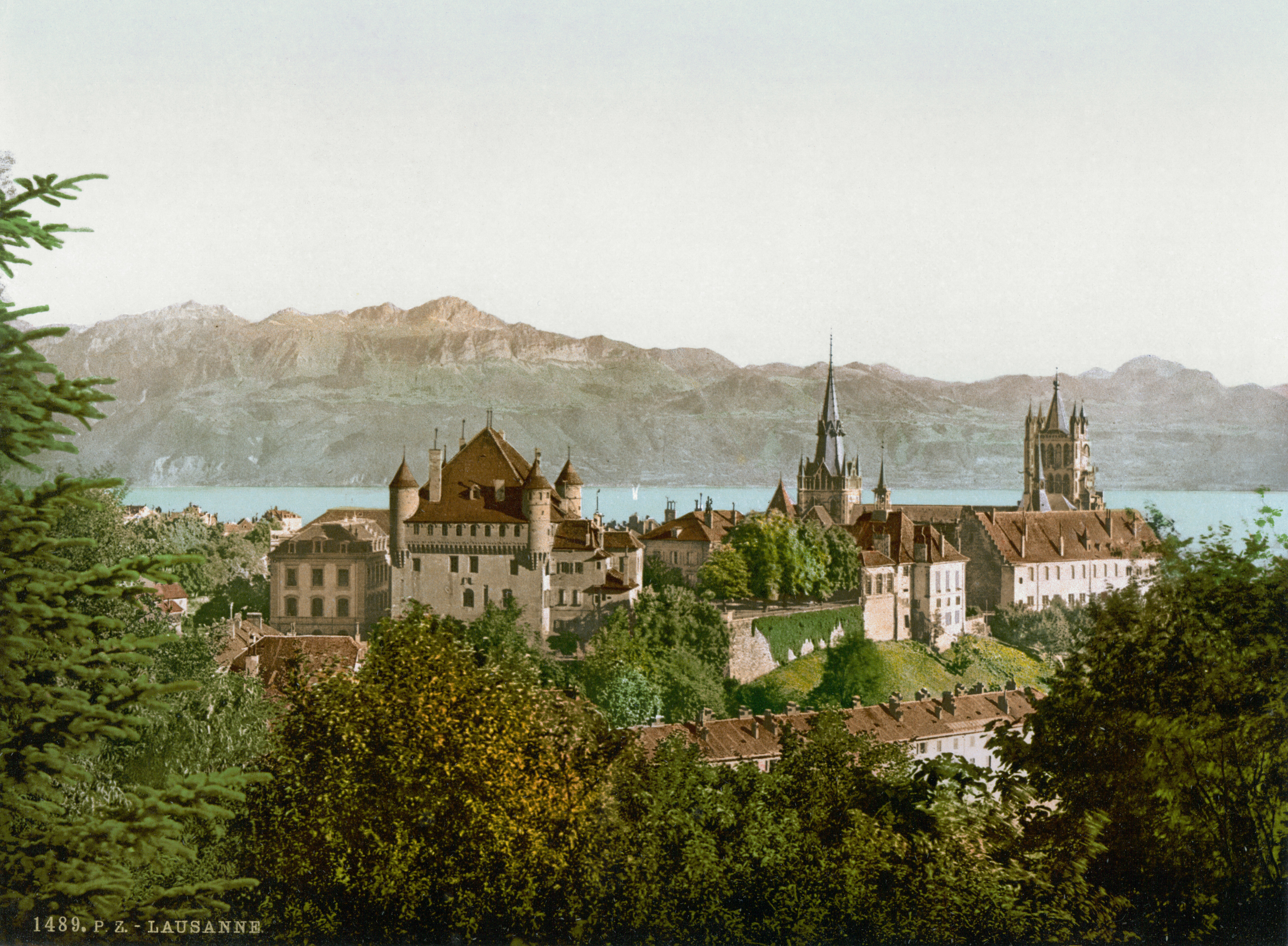
La Cité around 1900.

La Cité is a district (historical centre) of the city of Lausanne, in Switzerland.

The Cathedral, the Museum of Contemporary Design and Applied Arts, the Lausanne Museum of History, the Ancienne académie (today Gymnase de la cité), the Grand Council of Vaud (regional parliament), and the Château Saint-Maire are situated in this district. It is served by the Lausanne Metro Line 2, from Riponne and Bessières stations.

== Gallery ==
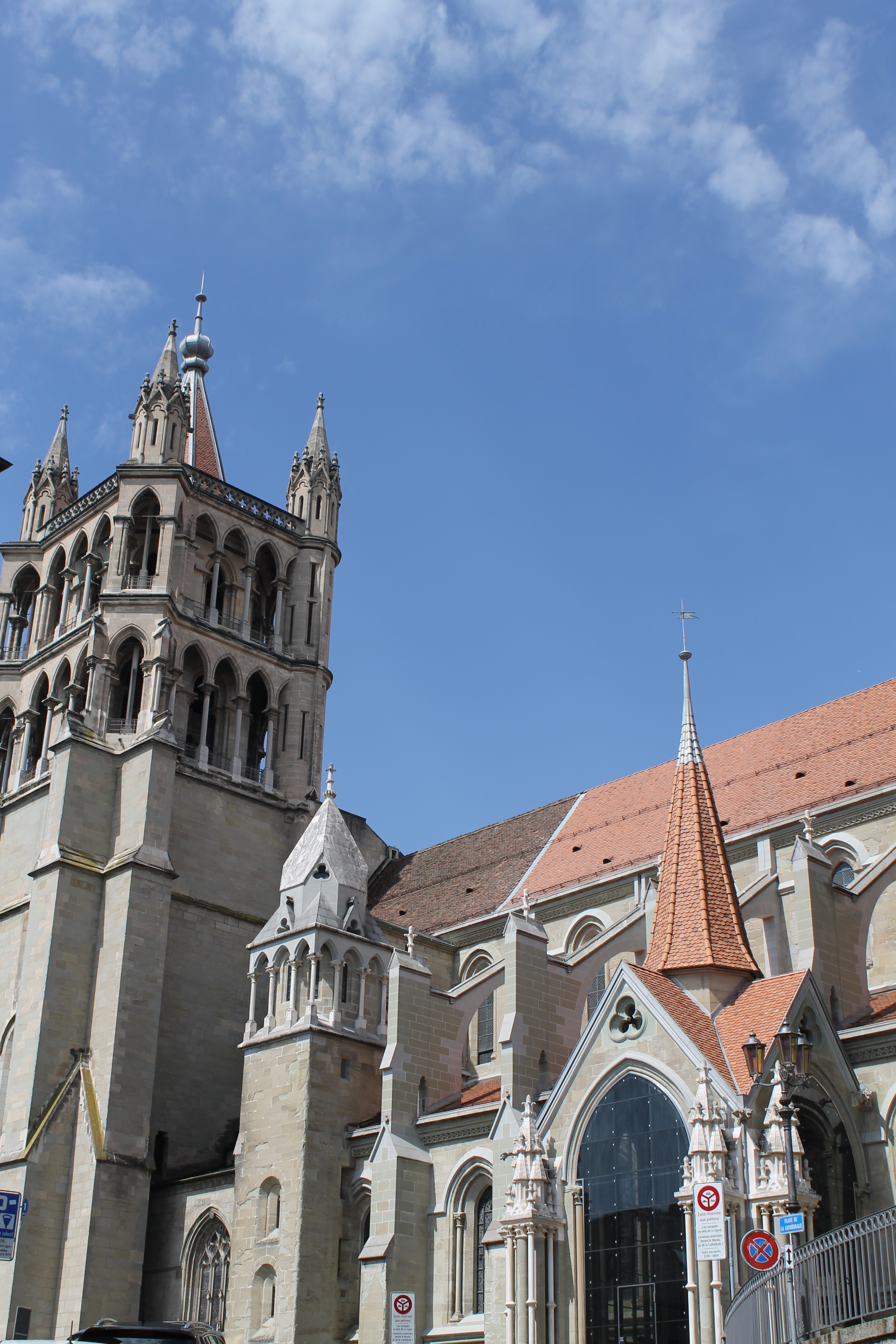
The Cathedral of Lausanne

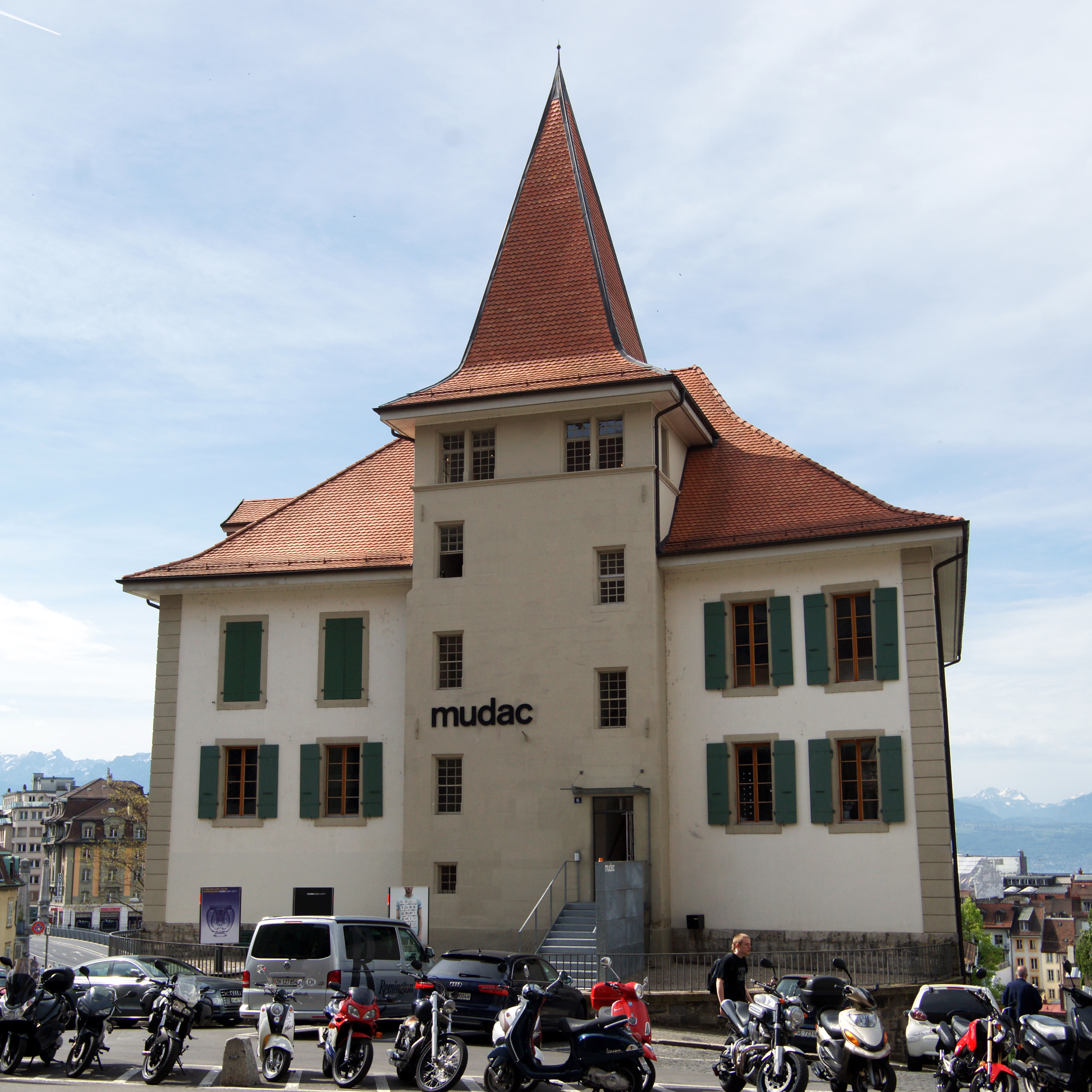
The Museum of Contemporary Design and Applied Arts

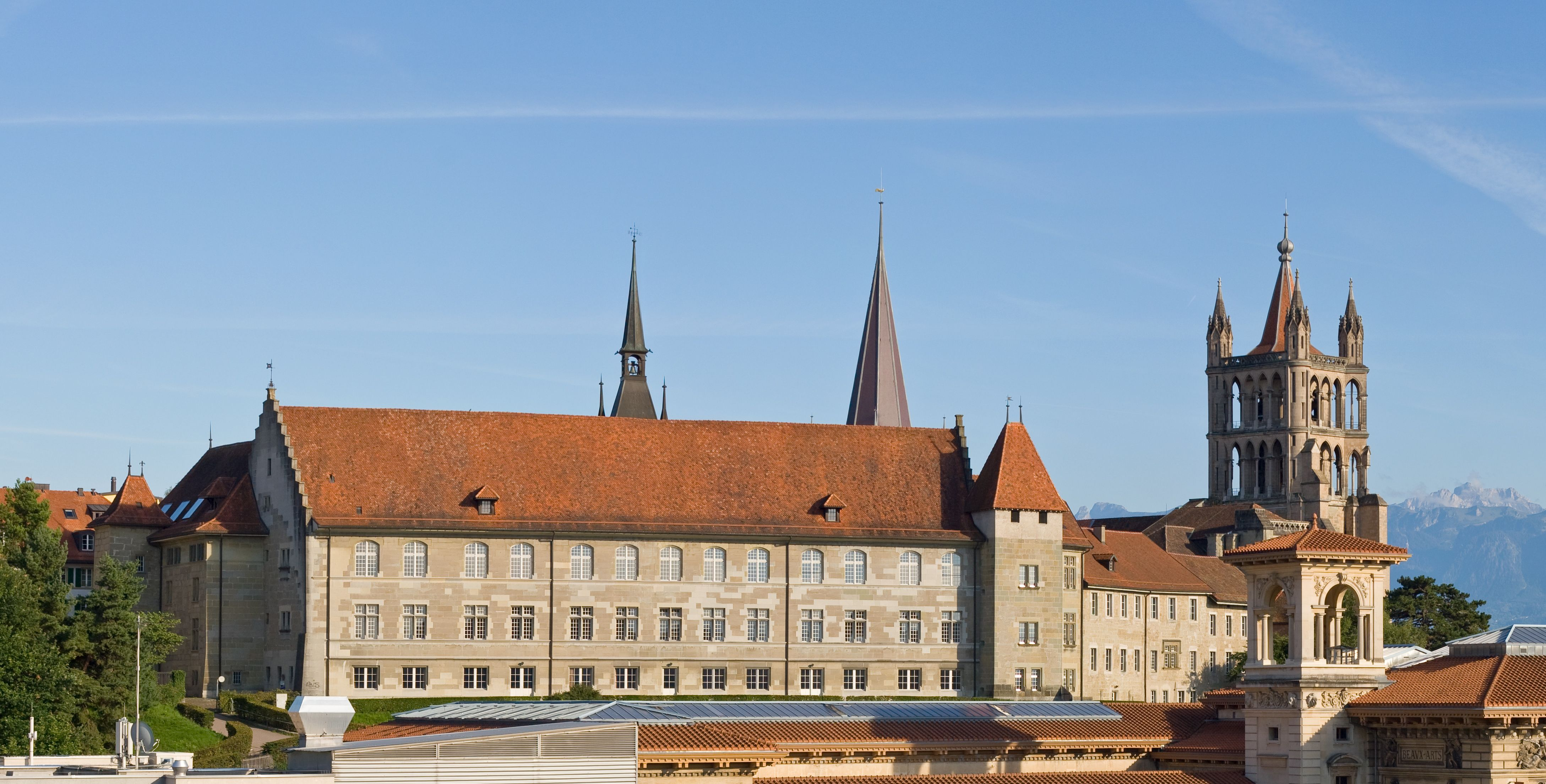
The Ancienne académie (former university building)

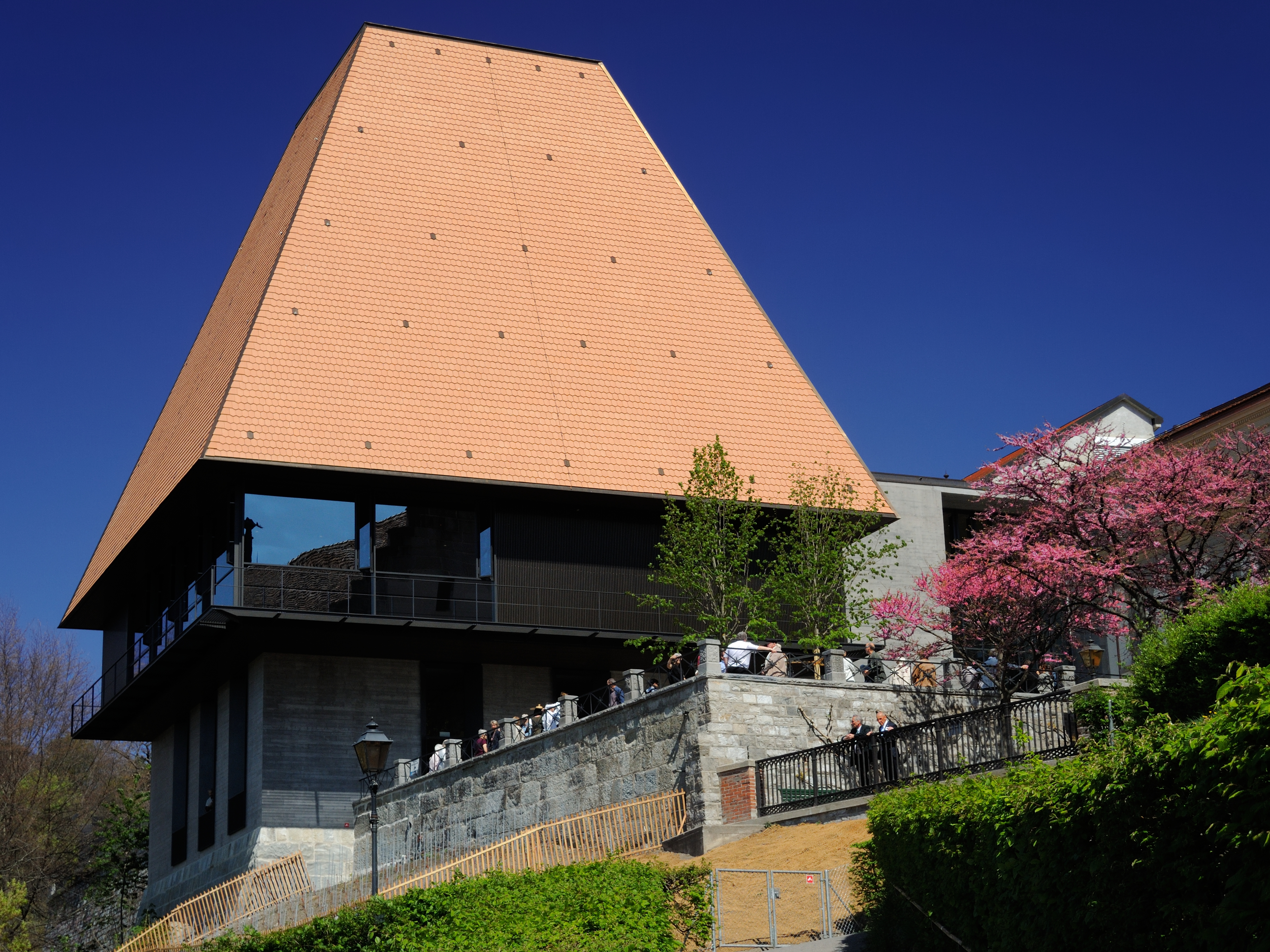
The Grand Council of Vaud (regional parliament)

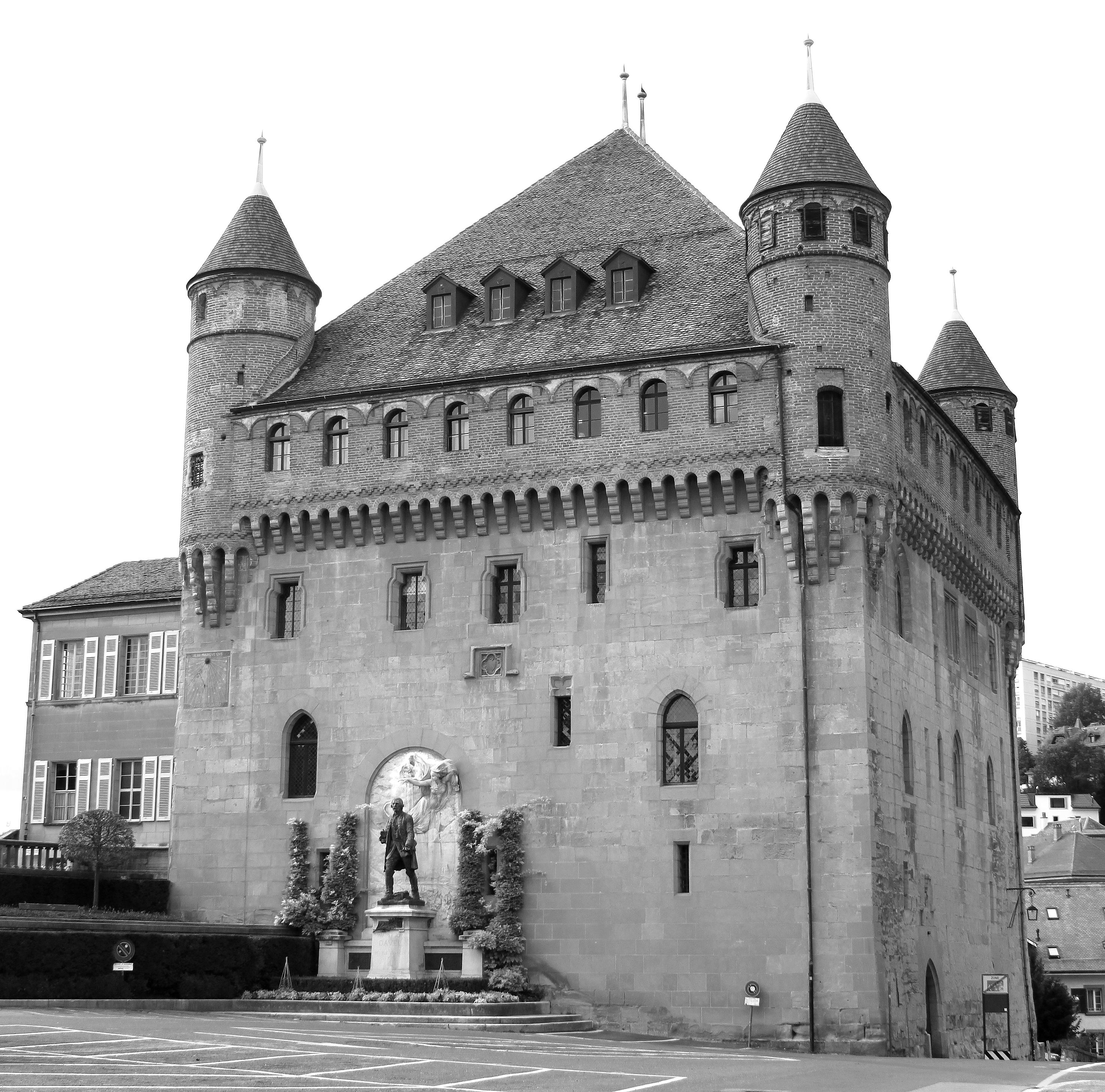
The Château Saint-Maire (Council of State of Vaud, regional government)
