= Bourla-papey =

Bourla-Papey was the name given to a popular revolt that took place between February and May 1802 in the Canton of Léman, in Switzerland, during the days of the Helvetic Republic. The uprising was in response to the restoration of feudal rights and taxes that had been abolished following the French invasion of 1798. The Bourla-papey seized archives from castles in the area now known as the Canton de Vaud, which they burned in an attempt to destroy records of what was owned by whom, making it impossible to collect taxes.

The leaders of the revolt were condemned to death by a special tribunal convened by the government of the Helvetic Republic in summer 1802, but were shortly afterwards given an amnesty. At the same time, all feudal rights were abolished in the canton, a few months before the Act of Mediation abolished them for the entire country.

== Name ==
The name Bourla-Papey (pronounced [ˈburla paˈpe]) is of Arpitan origin; it means Burn-Papers in English, in reference to the numerous acts committed during the revolt. This way of writing the name represents an old writing-system, and today Bourla-Papiérs is used in Arpitan.

== Background ==
The territory of what is now the canton of Vaud had been under the sovereignty of Bern since the 16th century, subjected, as a vassal territory, to feudal rights and associated taxes such as the tithe. During the 18th century a growing discontent began to emerge, and influential Vaudois patriots (Note: The term "patriot" is widely used throughout literature to refer to anyone who sought independence from the Canton of Bern. In the context, these were unitarians and sympathetic to the ideals of the French revolution. The term is used here for consistency with the cited reference works.) such as La Harpe sought French assistance to free them from Bern's control.

In 1798, several events came to a head simultaneously. Basel had also been petitioning the French Directory for support through Peter Ochs, and revolted on 13 January. The Vaudois began their own revolution a few days later, proclaiming the short-lived Lemanic Republic, and again asked France for assistance. The Directory responded by sending a force led by General Philippe Romain Ménard, which entered Switzerland on 28 January. The Helvetic revolution immediately spread to nearby cantons, and the Swiss Confederation collapsed within 8 months, replaced by a centralized government based on the principle of egalitarianism. The old feudal rights were abolished in late 1798.

The new Helvetic Republic was marked by instability. A series of successive coups overthrew government after government, and provided several changes between the two main camps, unitarians, and federalists. The former were supporters of the Republic and the centralized government it had brought. The federalists, many among them representatives of the old aristocracy, were pushing for a restoration of the old Swiss Confederation's decentralized state model.

Under the terms of the capitulation of the old Swiss Confederation, France seized vast amounts of money. The terms further specified that the Helvetic Republic had to pay for the support of French troops stationed on its territory. As a consequence, the state's coffers were empty. In order to restore its state budget, in 1800, the government demanded payment of all feudal taxes unpaid since 1798.

Between 1800 and 1801, many attempts were made to write a new constitution for the Helvetic Republic, and multiple governments were formed in accordance with texts that were replaced by newer versions. Many of the draft constitutions were sent to Napoleon for review, and he made his preferred version known. He also assisted in some of the coups that overthrew interim governments organized along constitutional lines that did not meet with his approval. A text was finally voted on in spring 1801. In the territory of the Canton de Vaud (which at that time was named Canton du Léman), it was rejected by roughly 14,000 votes to 6,000, out of 35,000 eligible voters, but as in the rest of the country, the 15,000 abstentions were counted as support votes.

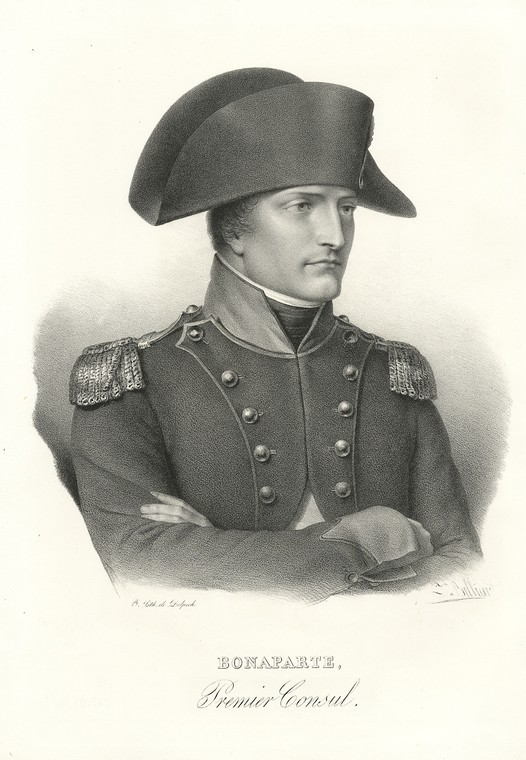
Bonaparte during his time as First Consul. Lithography by Z. Belliard, 1798.

Discontent over the reintroduction of feudal taxes, combined with the way the constitution of 1801 was adopted, led to increased resistance from the population of the Canton du Léman during 1801. A group of Vaudois patriots assembled as early as spring 1800 in Morges to discuss the idea that if the feudal taxes were not abolished, a reunion with France was preferable to remaining in the Helvetic Republic. The Helvetic Republic seized on that argument to issue a blanket condemnation of the Vaudois patriots, who in turn signed an address that represented a first clear call to arms. Their address stated that they felt deeply attached to a Swiss nation that upheld the notions of egalitarism, liberty, and justice, but insinuated that the government was unconstitutional.

The prefect Polier was charged by the government in Bern to denounce and arrest everyone involved in the issuance or publication of the address on 24 November 1800. Immediately, over 100 citizens and representatives from several towns and villages came forward claiming to be the author. The state attorney, Auguste Pidoux, and the cantonal courts refused to prosecute them however, and they were thus replaced, exacerbating the popular discontent. During the following weeks, more and more people came forward claiming to have written the address, and Polier requested the support of French troops to restore the peace.

The Treaty of Lunéville, which formally established the Helvetic Republic as an independent territory, had the side-effect of shifting the balance of power in Bern towards the federalists. Several voices started raising petitions for the old, pre-1798 order to be restored, including in the Canton du Léman, in other words, the reunion of Vaud with Bern. Bonaparte however had firmly expressed that he was completely opposed to such a move. While the prefect Polier was instructed to prosecute those who had made their views known, little was done to that effect. The now federalist-leaning government, under Alois von Reding, undertook several steps against unitarians and the Vaudois patriots in particular, ensuring that French troops were stationed in villages known to support the unitarian camp, and pursuing the collection of the back taxes with renewed vigor.

== Revolt ==
In January 1802, patriots (unitarians) from several smaller cantons met in Aargau to find ways to ensure the revolution of 1798 was not undone by the federalists, and started plotting a new coup for spring 1802. In preparation for this new uprising, several actions were planned, and after the two Vaudois delegates returned to their homes, emissaries went from village to village stirring up popular anger against the symbols of the old regime. These efforts were apparently driven by several of the members of the tribunals who had been replaced following the 1800 address, like Claude Mandrot or former cantonal judge Potterat.

Finally, on the evening of 19 February 1802, a mob assembled and raided the castle of La Sarraz, seizing and burning the archives listing the taxes due for the surrounding area, on the understanding that no taxes could be levied without the documents establishing what was due and by whom. The sub-prefect of Cossonay noted that the raid had been conducted by a large number of people, and that they had taken the time to sort through the archives, taking all deeds and administrative papers of value but leaving all family records in place.

The prefect Polier issued a condemnation of the events on the 20th, and the courts interrogated several dozen people without any success, despite there being a substantial reward offered for anyone who would help identify the culprits behind the raid. On 18 March, Polier was informed that the castle of Bière had been similarly raided, but as the building had been all but abandoned for a long time, it was not possible to determine when exactly the raid had taken place. Again rewards were offered, and ignored by the population.

Although March remained otherwise calm, rumors of an insurrection planned for early April began to circulate, and while Polier's warnings were mostly unheeded by the government of the Helvetic Republic, additional French troops were stationed in the most agitated districts.

A raid was planned on Lausanne, the canton's capital, for 1 May, but faltered due to a misunderstanding: part of the insurgents believed they were to assemble on 30 April for a raid on the 1st, while others thought they were to assemble on the 1st. Finding their numbers too low on the morning of the 1st, the crowd dispersed peacefully. They started regrouping in the countryside near Lausanne over the following days, though. According to the historian Eugène Monod, it is only at that point that the captain Louis Reymond, who had been active in the 1798 uprisings, was made the visible leader of the movement.

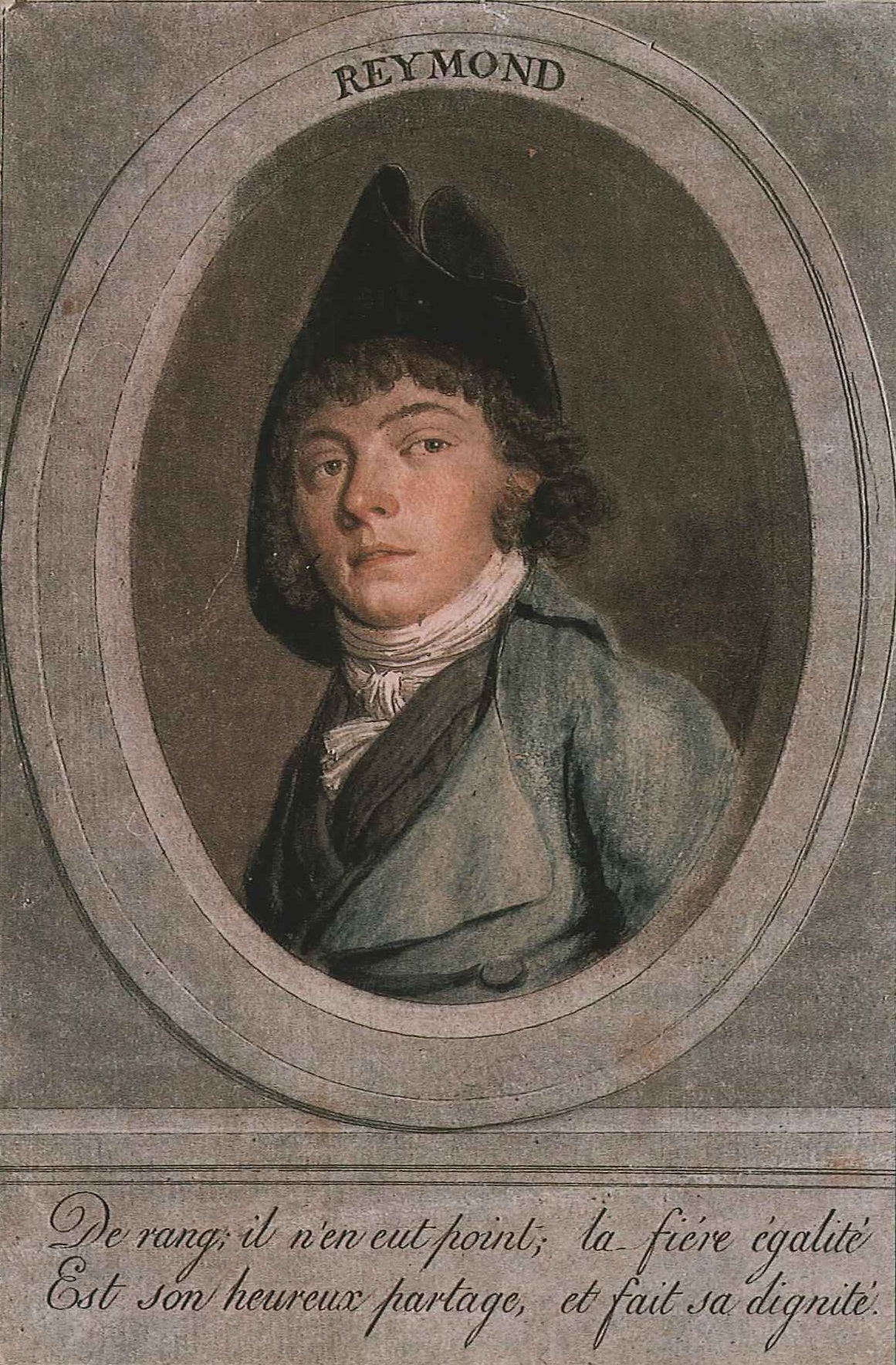
Louis Reymond, who took over the leadership of the Bourla-Papey, by Benjamin Bolomey, 1798

As groups of Bourla-papey started to assemble in most villages of the canton, raids on the archives began in earnest. Between 1–12 May, documents were seized from many castles and burned, including in Morges, Yverdon, Grandson and Rolle. In response to increasingly worried notes from the prefect, the government of the Helvetic Republic finally made one senator Kuhn plenipotentiary and sent him to Lausanne, where he arrived on 7 May. His initial assessment underestimated the importance of the movement. On the morning of the 8th, the Bourla-papey started converging on Lausanne again, and when Kuhn had the alarm sounded, only 15 militiamen responded.

Kuhn found himself faced by an estimated 3,000 of Reymond's insurgents, against whom he had a contingent of only 400 French troops at his disposal, some of whose officers were said to be sympathetic to the Vaudois cause. Kuhn met Reymond and asked for his terms; Reymond demanded the abolition of feudal taxes and a general amnesty. At the conclusion of their negotiations the Bourla-papey returned to their positions outside the city, and Kuhn travelled to Bern with their demands.

The government again misjudged the situation, in particular the strength of popular feeling, and how few troops were available to resolve the crisis by force. Kuhn was instructed to reject the insurgents' demands, but on his return to Lausanne he promised a general amnesty and the abolition of all feudal taxes on his own authority. The daily raids that had been continuing in the more remote districts ceased, and the movement dissolved.

During the first 12 days of May, most of the archives in the canton had been burned; only Lausanne and a few more remote areas remained untouched. Kuhn estimated that the insurgents under Reymond numbered 4,000–5,000, compared to a combined force of 1,300 Helvetic and French troops under his control.

== Aftermath ==
Departing for Bern on 13 May, Kuhn officially denied having made any concessions. Yet the rumors that the Bourla-papey had managed to obtain both the end of the feudal regime and an amnesty started circulating in nearby cantons, and an attempt to replicate their actions was started in the canton of Fribourg a few days later. Upon his departure, Kuhn had split his troops and spread them out on the territory of the canton, to ensure a new uprising could not start anew.

By the end of May, the government replaced Kuhn with Lanther, who immediately announced a prohibition on openly bearing arms. At the same time, he also announced that the value of the remaining feudal titles would be bought out, and that this process was to be completed by January 1803. While such a buy-out would in practice abolish those titles and the associated taxes, it remained unclear whether the buying back was to be done by the canton, or the peasants. Because of the lack of clarity, the countryside remained agitated, and over the following weeks, the government enjoined Lanther to clamp down firmly on the population.

By the end of May, in reaction to the rumours spreading to other cantons that the Bourla-Papey had succeeded, the Helvetic Republic ordered the creation of a special tribunal to try the Bourla-Papey, formed exclusively by citizen from other cantons. While the new tribunal took several weeks to be established, the ringleaders of the Bourla-papey, including Reymond, fled to France. He and several others were sentenced to death in their absence in July 1802.

At the same time, following the terms of the Treaty of Lunéville, all French troops withdrew from Swiss territory. In the vacuum left by their departure, another, wider, insurgent movement arose, the Stecklikrieg. Deprived of the military support from France, the unpopular government of the Helvetic Republic was defeated in Bern on 18 September 1802 and fled to Lausanne.

The Stecklikrieg was mostly motivated by a federalistic movement opposed to the centralized government of the Republic, which had to turn to the Bourla-Papey for support. The Helvetic Republic granted the promised amnesty and officially abolished feudal taxes by decree on 29 September.

== Historical research and literature ==
While there is consensus that the peasant discontent that built up in 1800 and 1801 was orchestrated by unitarian patriots, their identity has remained a source of speculation. Louis Reymond, despite his initial condemnation by the special tribunal, was never thought to be more than a figurehead. Yet the tribunal's investigations failed to uncover the true instigators or the source of the money that had supported the insurgents. In 1950, historian René Secrétan documented the various speculations made over time but pointed out that even in 1802, everyone had remained silent.

The authorities seem to have been quite aware that the movement was raised in opposition to the feudal taxes. Historian Eugène Monod, for instance, mentions that in early April 1802, one of the sub-prefects had advised that their abolition would be "the one and only way to restore the peace".

The Bourla-Papey served as the backdrop to Charles-Ferdinand Ramuz' 1942 novel, La guerre aux papiers.
