= Georges Boisot =

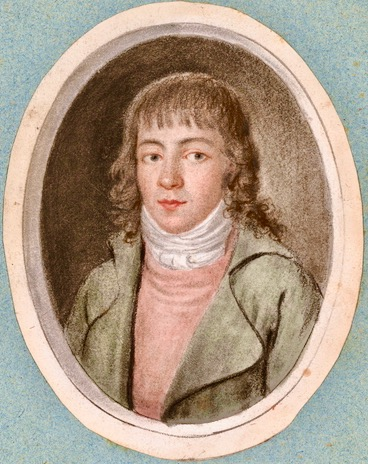
- Georges Boisot by Benjamin Bolomey (circa 1801).

Vaud State Councilor
- In office May 7, 1830 – February 14, 1845

Personal details
- Born: 14 September 1774 Mézières, Vaud
- Died: 19 December 1853 (aged 79)
- Party: Liberal party
- Occupation: Chancellor

Georges Boisot (14 September 1774 – 19 December 1853) was born in Mézières, Vaud. He was the Minister of Interior of the Helvetic Republic from 1798 to 1803. Later he became Secretary of the Vaud Department of the Interior, followed by a position as State Chancellor of the Swiss canton.

== Biography ==
Georges Boisot was the son of Jean François Louis Boisot, who was a Bishop at Sainte-Marie-aux-Mines and Louise Peter. He was married to Madelaine Perregaux, daughter of Alexandre Perregaux, architect and sculptor on ivory.

=== Early life ===
Boisot was taught to read by his father and entered school in 1783. In 1795 he began studying theology at the Lausanne Academy, and later occupied the office of Professor of Mathematics and taught Differential calculus.

=== Revolutionary principles ===
Boisot was interested in the revolutionary principles that circulated in the Canton of Vaud. In 1798 he participated in events where the Vaudois drove out the Bernese governor, establishing the Lemanic Republic.

=== Professional background ===
Boisot was secretary-editor of the Administrative Chamber of the new Canton of Léman (1798-1803). In February 1800, after leaving Lausanne for Bern, he became head of office at the Ministry of Interior of the Helvetic Republic (1798-1803). This is when the French invaded Switzerland and turned it into an ally known as the Helvetic republic.

On 10 March 1803, under the Act of Mediation, the Helvetic government was dissolved and on 14 April 1803, the Canon of Vaud was born. On his return to Lausanne, Boisot became secretary of the Vaud Department of the Interior. He became Chief Secretary of the Petit Conseil and in 1815, Chancellor of the State. Switzerland became a confederation once again.

From June to December 1829, Boisot participated in the revision of the Vaud Constitution, whose limited scope would attract discontent among the population and bring about a revolution in December 1930 and a new Constitution in June 1831. The revolution of 1830, also known as the July Revolution, led to the overthrow of King Charles X.

Boisot joined the Council of State on 7 May 1830 and was re-elected to the new government in August 1831 and was its president in 1833. Boisot shared the management of four departments: Military, Finance, Interior, and Justice of the police with his eight colleagues. Due to his Liberal conservative beliefs, he was forced out of office during the Revolution in 1845.

In January 1948, Jean Charles Biaudet wrote the Georges Boisot And The Vaudoise Revolution Of 1798, with four chapter from the unpublished memoirs of Chancellor Boisot, taken in part from the Historic Vaudoise Review.

=== Retirement ===
Boisot spent the last years of his life in a modest financial situation. He wrote a memoir in 1842, that was partially published.

== Death ==
Georges Boisot died on 19 December 1853, at the age of seventy-nine, in Lausanne, at 22 Rue Saint-Pierre, Vaud, Switzerland.

== Bibliography ==
- Jean-Charles Biaudet, "Georges Boisot and the Vaudois Revolution of 1798", in RHV, January 1948, pages 41–68
- P. A. Bovard, The Vaud government from 1803 to 1962, 1982

== See also ==
- Jean-Baptiste Boisot
- Jean Charles Biaudet
