= List of officials of the Helvetic Republic =

This is a list of officials during the Helvetic Republic. During its short existence (1798–1803), the institutions of the Helvetic Republic changed frequently.

== Executive ==
=== Directory (directoire) (1798 – 7 January 1800) ===
==== Members of the Directory ====
date	Directors				
17./18.04.1798	Lukas Legrand	Pierre-Maurice Glayre	Urs Viktor Oberlin	David Ludwig Bay	Alphons Pfyffer
29.06.1798	Lukas Legrand	Pierre-Maurice Glayre	Urs Viktor Oberlin	Frédéric-César de La Harpe	Alphons Pfyffer
30.06.1798	Lukas Legrand	Pierre-Maurice Glayre	Urs Viktor Oberlin	Frédéric-César de La Harpe	Peter Ochs
29.01.1799	David Ludwig Bay	Pierre-Maurice Glayre	Urs Viktor Oberlin	Frédéric-César de La Harpe	Peter Ochs
09.05.1799	David Ludwig Bay	Johann Rudolf Dolder	Urs Viktor Oberlin	Frédéric-César de La Harpe	Peter Ochs
23.06.1799	François Pierre Savary	Johann Rudolf Dolder	Urs Viktor Oberlin	Frédéric-César de La Harpe	Peter Ochs
26.06.1799	François Pierre Savary	Johann Rudolf Dolder	Urs Viktor Oberlin	Frédéric-César de La Harpe	Philipp Secrétan
07.01.1800	François Pierre Savary	Johann Rudolf Dolder	Urs Viktor Oberlin	Frédéric-César de La Harpe	Philipp Secrétan

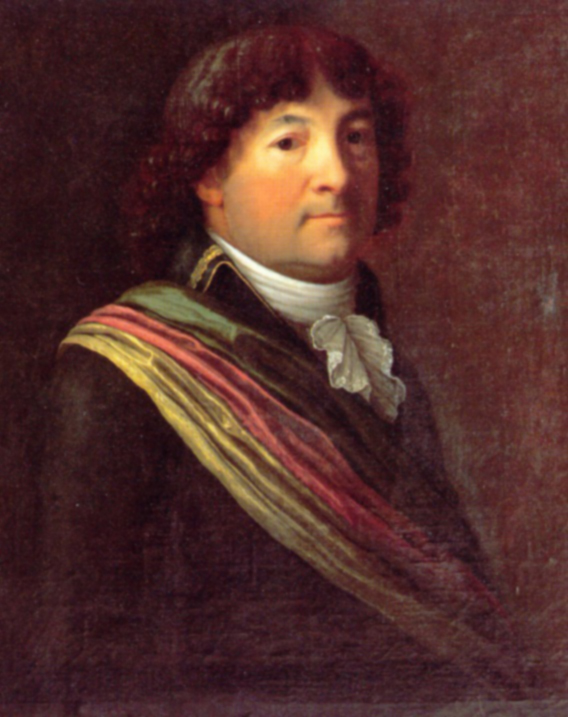
Peter Ochs

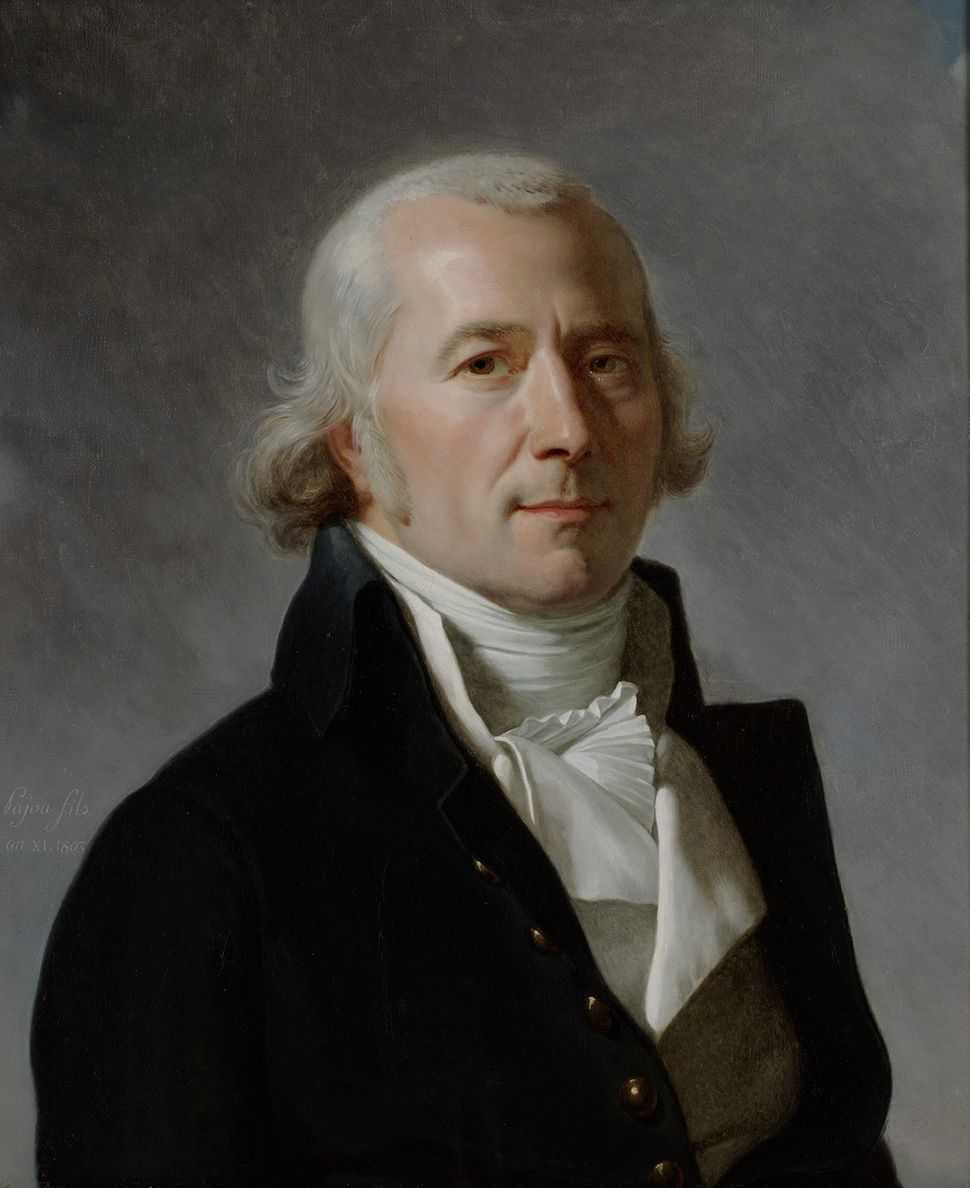
Frédéric-César de la Harpe

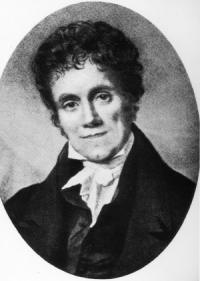
Philipp Albert Stapfer

==== Presidents of the Directory ====
From	To	Person
22 April 1798	31 May 1798	Johann Lukas Legrand
1 June 1798	1 July 1798	Urs Viktor Oberlin
2 July 1798	31 July 1798	Pierre-Maurice Glayre
1 August 1798	31 August 1798	Frédéric-César de la Harpe
1 September 1798	30 September 1798	Peter Ochs
1 Oktober 1798	21 November 1798	Frédéric-César de la Harpe
22 November 1798	12 January 1799	Urs Viktor Oberlin
13 January 1799	5 March 1799	Pierre-Maurice Glayre
6 March 1799	26 April 1799	David Ludwig Bay
27 April 1799	23 June 1799	Peter Ochs
24 January 1799	4 September 1799	Frédéric-César de la Harpe
5 September 1799	17 November 1799	François Pierre Savary
18 November 1799	7 January 1800	Johann Rudolf Dolder

=== Landammann of the Helvetic Republic, 21 November 1801 ===
- Alois von Reding, First Landammann
- Johann Rudolf von Frisching, Second Landammann

=== Ministers of the First Helvetic Republic ===
- Louis François Bégoz, Exterior (1798–1801; before that War, May–October 1798)
- Hans Konrad Finsler, Finance and Economy
- Albrecht Rengger, Interior
- Philipp Albert Stapfer, Arts and Science, later ambassador in Paris
- Franz Bernhard Meyer von Schauensee, Justice and Police (from 1798)
- Hans Caspar Hirzel (1746–1827), Justice and Police (1801)
- Joseph Lanther, War

== Legislature ==
=== Senate ===
Senators as of .. (names normalized where possible)

Canton	Senator	Place
Aargau	Jean Rod. Dolder	Moerikon
Aargau	J. N. Meyer, père	Aarau
Aargau	Joseph Vaucher	Niederlenz
Aargau	Rudolph Lauper	Oberbuurg
Basel	Peter Ochs	Basel
Basel	Jean Zaeslein	Basel
Basel	Jean Buxdorf	Basel
Basel	Guillaume Ochs	Liesthal
Bern	Louis Bay	Bern
Bern	Jean Ulrich Luthi	Langnau
Bern	Benoit Munger	Schopfen
Bern	Jean Ulrich Zulauf	Langenthal
Fribourg	George Badoux	Romont
Fribourg	Abraham Fornerod	Avenches
Fribourg	Tobie Barras	Praroman
Fribourg	Louis Devevey	Estavayer-le-Lac
Léman	Jules Muret	Morges
Léman	Louis Frossard	Moudon
Léman	Urbain La Fleschère	Nyon
Léman	Jean-Jacques Bertholet	Corseaux
Lucerne	Jean-Pierre Genhard	Sempach
Lucerne	Alfonse Pfyffer	Lucerne
Lucerne	Henri Grauer	Rothenbourg
Lucerne	Joseph Burkard	Merenschwand
Oberland	Samuel Joneli	Boltigen
Oberland	Jean Vonbergen	Oberhasli
Oberland	Jean Schneider	Frutigen
Oberland	Jean Karlen	Erlenbach
Schaffhausen	Jean Conrad Ziegler	Schaffhausen
Schaffhausen	Bernard Müller	Thayngen
Schaffhausen	Martin Stamm	Schleitheim
Schaffhausen	Jean Henri Keller	Schaffhausen
Solothurn	Joseph Schwaller	Solothurn
Solothurn	Jean Brunner	Balsthal
Solothurn	Joseph Lüthi	Solothurn
Solothurn	Xavier Zeltner	Solothurn
Zürich	Jacques Bodmer	Stäfa
Zürich	Paul Uster	Zürich
Zürich	Henri Stapfer	Horgen
Zürich	Henri Rahn	Zürich
