= Juncus wallichianus =

Conservation status
- Least Concern (IUCN 3.1)

Scientific classification
- Kingdom: Plantae
- Clade: Tracheophytes
- Clade: Angiosperms
- Clade: Monocots
- Clade: Commelinids
- Order: Poales
- Family: Juncaceae
- Genus: Juncus
- Species: J. wallichianus

Binomial name
- Juncus wallichianus J.Gay ex Laharpe

Synonyms
- List: Juncus auritus K.F.Wu; Juncus indicus Royle ex D.Don; Juncus koidzumii Satake; Juncus leschenaultii var. unitubulosus (Buchenau) Novikov; Juncus monticola Steud.; Juncus nikkoensis var. pinifolius Satake; Juncus ohwianus Kao; Juncus prismatocarpus subsp. teretifolius K.F.Wu; Juncus prismatocarpus subvar. unitubulosus Buchenau; Juncus pseudokrameri Satake; Juncus sphaerocephalus K.F.Wu; Juncus yanshanuensis Novikov

Species of plant

Juncus wallichianus, Wallich's rush, is a species of flowering plant in the family Juncaceae. It is native to the Indian Subcontinent, mainland Southeast Asia, Sumatra, Java, New Guinea, central and eastern China, Hainan, Taiwan, Korea, Japan, the Ryukyu Islands, and Primorsky Krai and Sakhalin in Russia, and it has been introduced to Mauritius. A densely tufted perennial 25 to 40 cm (10 to 16 in) tall, it is typically found in wet areas. Its chromosome count is 2n = 80. It was used for paper making.
