= Île de la Harpe =

Island in Lake Geneva, Switzerland

Coordinates: 46°27′20″N 6°20′22″E

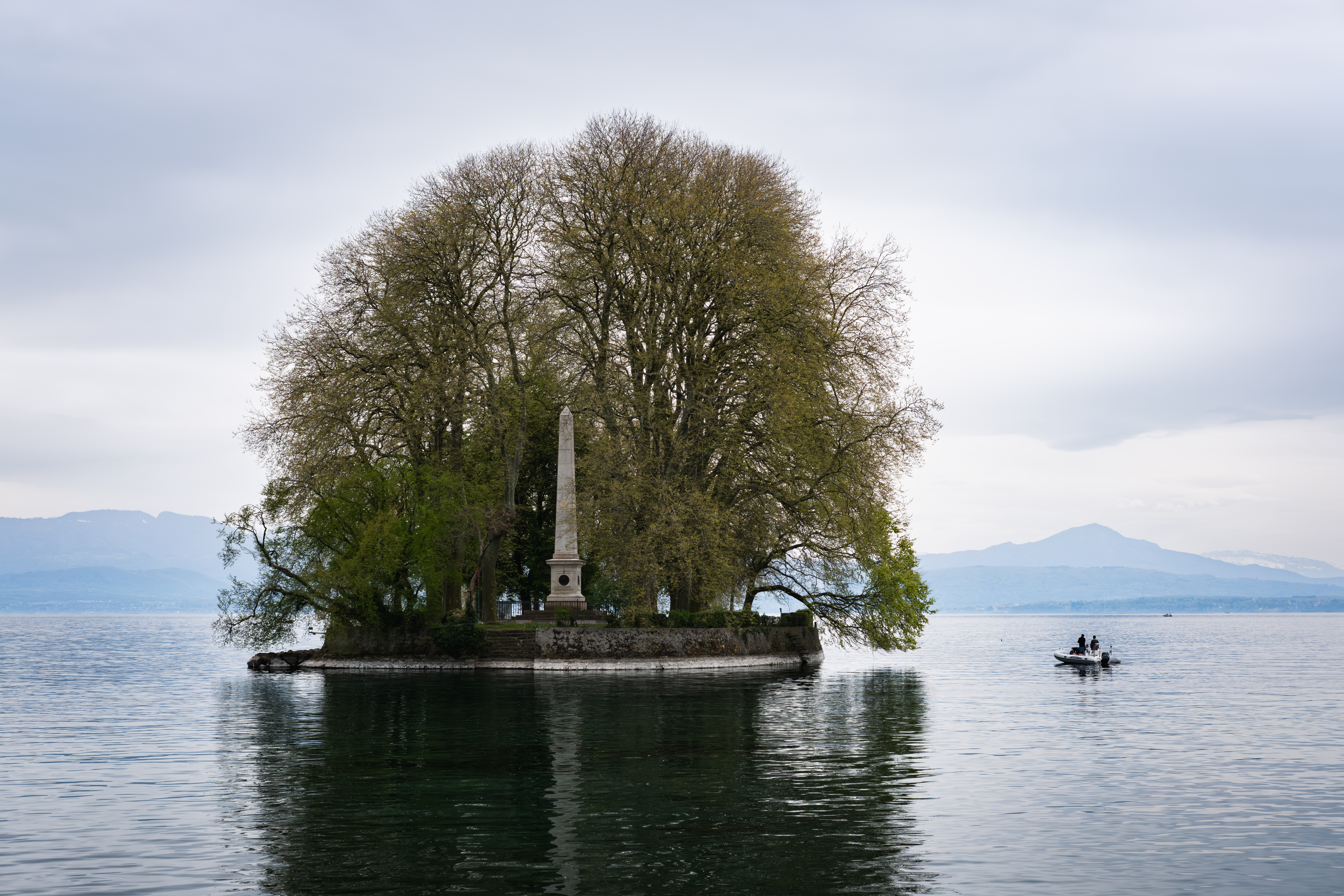
- View from the shore

- Location within Switzerland

Geography
- Location: Lake Geneva
- Length: 130 m (430 ft)
- Width: 40 m (130 ft)

Administration
- Switzerland
- Canton: Vaud
- District: Nyon

The Île de la Harpe is an island in Lake Geneva, located on the territory of the municipality of Rolle, in the canton of Vaud. It is an artificial island built in 1837. The island was named after the political leader Frédéric-César de La Harpe, after his death in 1838. An obelisk was built on the island in honour of de la Harpe. Since 1875, the island is property of the commune of Rolle. It was classified as a historical monument in 1968.

The island has a length of 130 metres and a width of about 40 metres. The distance from the shore is 70 metres.

== See also ==
- List of islands of Switzerland
