= Tartegnin =

- Municipality
- Flag Coat of arms
- Location of Tartegnin
- Location within Switzerland Location within Canton of Vaud
- Coordinates: 46°28′N 06°19′E
- Country: Switzerland
- Canton: Vaud
- District: Nyon

Government
  - Mayor: Syndic; Laurent Munier

Area
  - Total: 1.09 km^{2} (0.42 sq mi)
- Elevation: 495 m (1,624 ft)

Population (2004)
  - Total: 212
  - Density: 194/km^{2} (504/sq mi)
- Time zone: UTC+01:00 (CET)
  - Summer (DST): UTC+02:00 (CEST)
- Postal code: 1180
- SFOS number: 5862
- ISO 3166 code: CH-VD
- Surrounded by: Gilly, Rolle, Essertines-sur-Rolle
- Website: www.tartegnin.ch

Tartegnin (French pronunciation: [taʁtəɲɛ̃]) is a municipality in the district of Nyon in the canton of Vaud in Switzerland.

== History ==
Tartegnin is first mentioned in 1018 as Tritiniaco.

== Geography ==
Tartegnin has an area, as of 2009, of 1.1 square kilometers (0.42 mi^{2}). Of this area, 0.58 km^{2} (0.22 mi^{2}) or 53.2% is used for agricultural purposes, while 0.42 km^{2} (0.16 mi^{2}) or 38.5% is forested. Of the rest of the land, 0.07 km^{2} (17 acres) or 6.4% is settled (buildings or roads), 0.01 km^{2} (2.5 acres) or 0.9% is either rivers or lakes.

Of the built up area, housing and buildings made up 1.8% and transportation infrastructure made up 4.6%. Out of the forested land, all of the forested land area is covered with heavy forests. Of the agricultural land, 3.7% is used for growing crops and 3.7% is pastures, while 45.9% is used for orchards or vine crops. All the water in the municipality is flowing water.

The municipality was part of the Rolle District until it was dissolved on 31 August 2006, and Tartegnin became part of the new district of Nyon.

The municipality is located in the heart of the vineyards of La Côte, above the town of Rolle.

== Coat of arms ==
The blazon of the municipal coat of arms is Or, around a Tau-cross sable a Vine Vert fructed Gules, issuant from a Mount Vert.

== Demographics ==
Tartegnin has a population (as of December 2020) of 238. As of 2008, 18.6% of the population are resident foreign nationals. Over the last 10 years (1999–2009 ) the population has changed at a rate of 12.4%. It has changed at a rate of 6.2% due to migration and at a rate of 7.3% due to births and deaths.

Most of the population (as of 2000) speaks French (167 or 86.1%) as their first language, with English being second most common (8 or 4.1%) and Portuguese being third (7 or 3.6%). There are 4 people who speak German, 4 people who speak Italian.

The age distribution, as of 2009, in Tartegnin is; 31 children or 14.3% of the population are between 0 and 9 years old and 28 teenagers or 12.9% are between 10 and 19. Of the adult population, 24 people or 11.1% of the population are between 20 and 29 years old. 36 people or 16.6% are between 30 and 39, 33 people or 15.2% are between 40 and 49, and 21 people or 9.7% are between 50 and 59. The senior population distribution is 22 people or 10.1% of the population are between 60 and 69 years old, 14 people or 6.5% are between 70 and 79, there are 8 people or 3.7% who are between 80 and 89.

As of 2000, there were 76 people who were single and never married in the municipality. There were 100 married individuals, 7 widows or widowers and 11 individuals who are divorced.

As of 2000, there were 86 private households in the municipality, and an average of 2.2 persons per household. There were 27 households that consist of only one person and 4 households with five or more people. Out of a total of 90 households that answered this question, 30.0% were households made up of just one person and there was 1 adult who lived with their parents. Of the rest of the households, there are 35 married couples without children, 22 married couples with children There was one single parent with a child or children.

In 2000 there were 21 single family homes (or 39.6% of the total) out of a total of 53 inhabited buildings. There were 11 multi-family buildings (20.8%), along with 19 multi-purpose buildings that were mostly used for housing (35.8%) and 2 other use buildings (commercial or industrial) that also had some housing (3.8%).

In 2000, a total of 83 apartments (85.6% of the total) were permanently occupied, while 6 apartments (6.2%) were seasonally occupied and 8 apartments (8.2%) were empty. As of 2009, the construction rate of new housing units was 0 new units per 1000 residents. The vacancy rate for the municipality, in 2010, was 0%.

The historical population is given in the following chart:

== Sights ==
The entire hamlet of Tartegnin is designated as part of the Inventory of Swiss Heritage Sites.

== Politics ==
In the 2007 federal election the most popular party was the SVP which received 26.07% of the vote. The next three most popular parties were the FDP (18.12%), the Green Party (14.39%) and the SP (13.43%). In the federal election, a total of 74 votes were cast, and the voter turnout was 56.1%.

== Economy ==
As of 2010, Tartegnin had an unemployment rate of 3.2%. As of 2008, there were 46 people employed in the primary economic sector and about 10 businesses involved in this sector. 10 people were employed in the secondary sector and there were 3 businesses in this sector. 16 people were employed in the tertiary sector, with 7 businesses in this sector. There were 119 residents of the municipality who were employed in some capacity, of which females made up 42.9% of the workforce.

In 2008 the total number of full-time equivalent jobs was 58. The number of jobs in the primary sector was 38, all of which were in agriculture. The number of jobs in the secondary sector was 8 of which 3 or (37.5%) were in manufacturing and 5 (62.5%) were in construction. The number of jobs in the tertiary sector was 12. In the tertiary sector; 4 or 33.3% were in wholesale or retail sales or the repair of motor vehicles, 5 or 41.7% were in a hotel or restaurant, 1 was a technical professional or scientist, 2 or 16.7% were in education.

In 2000, there were 10 workers who commuted into the municipality and 69 workers who commuted away. The municipality is a net exporter of workers, with about 6.9 workers leaving the municipality for every one entering. Of the working population, 10.1% used public transportation to get to work, and 54.6% used a private car.

== Religion ==
From the 2000 census, 53 or 27.3% were Roman Catholic, while 103 or 53.1% belonged to the Swiss Reformed Church. Of the rest of the population, there were 5 members of an Orthodox church (or about 2.58% of the population), and there were 8 individuals (or about 4.12% of the population) who belonged to another Christian church. There was 1 individual who was Jewish, and there was 1 individual who was Islamic. There was 1 person who was Buddhist and 1 individual who belonged to another church. 24 (or about 12.37% of the population) belonged to no church, are agnostic or atheist, and 1 individuals (or about 0.52% of the population) did not answer the question.

== Education ==
In Tartegnin about 67 or (34.5%) of the population have completed non-mandatory upper secondary education, and 42 or (21.6%) have completed additional higher education (either university or a Fachhochschule). Of the 42 who completed tertiary schooling, 40.5% were Swiss men, 35.7% were Swiss women, 14.3% were non-Swiss men.

In the 2009/2010 school year there were a total of 35 students in the Tartegnin school district. In the Vaud cantonal school system, two years of non-obligatory pre-school are provided by the political districts. During the school year, the political district provided pre-school care for a total of 1,249 children of which 563 children (45.1%) received subsidized pre-school care. The canton's primary school program requires students to attend for four years. There were 23 students in the municipal primary school program. The obligatory lower secondary school program lasts for six years and there were 11 students in those schools. There was also 1 student who was home schooled or attended another non-traditional school.

As of 2000, there were 19 students in Tartegnin who came from another municipality, while 28 residents attended schools outside the municipality.
