= Canton of Léman =

Canton of the Helvetic Republic (1798–1803)

Canton of Léman Canton du Léman
- Canton of the Helvetic Republic
- 1798–1803
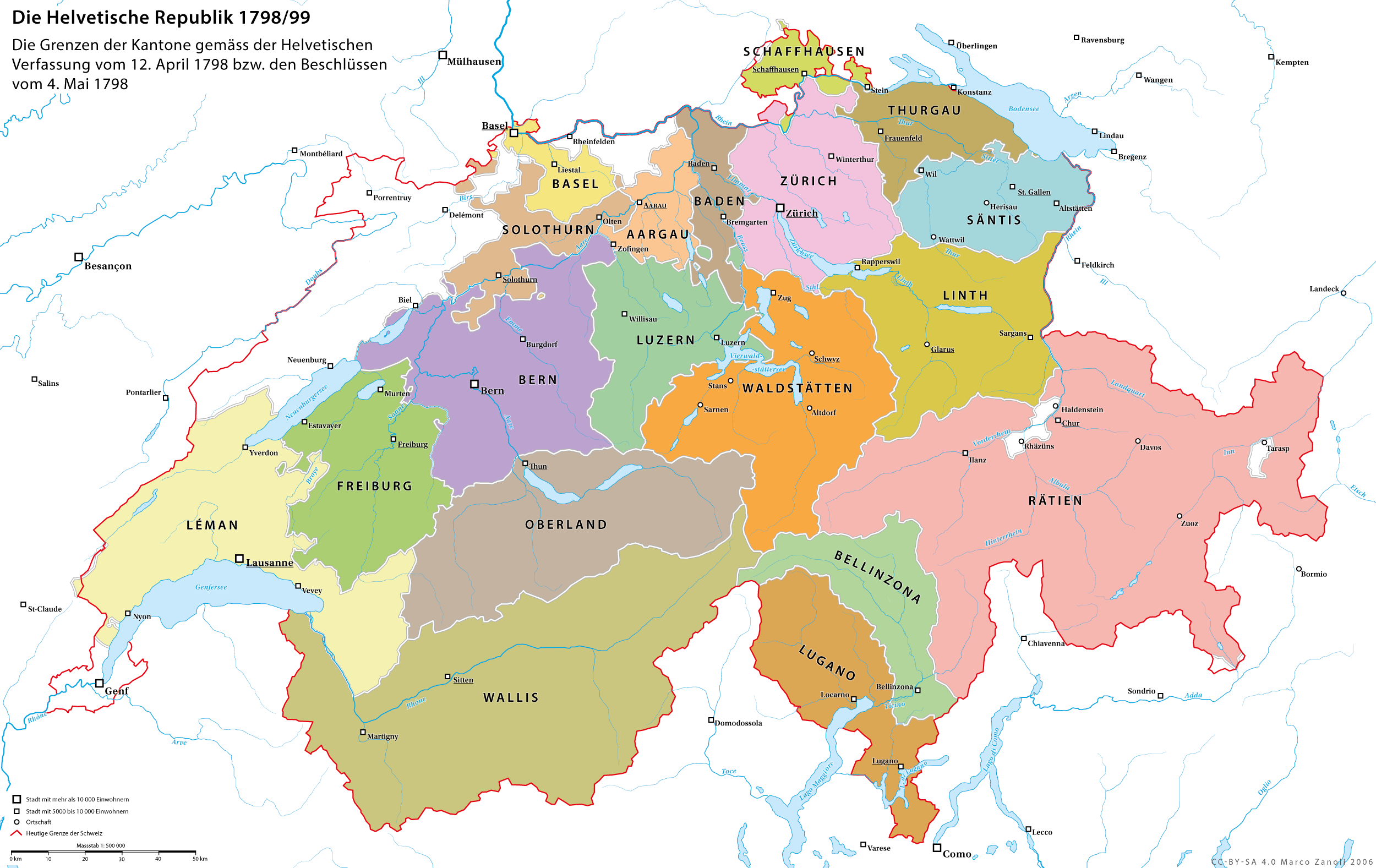
- The Helvetic Republic, as of the constitution of 12 April 1798, showing the canton of Léman in yellow, leftmost, to the north and west of Lake Geneva
- Capital: Lausanne
- History
  - Independence from Bern: 24 January 1798
  - Helvetic Republic proclaimed: 12 April 1798
  - Act of Mediation: 19 February 1803
Preceded by	Succeeded by
Canton of Bern	Vaud

Léman was the name of a canton of the Helvetic Republic from 1798 to 1803, corresponding to the territory of modern Vaud. A former subject territory of Bern, Vaud had been independent for only four months in 1798 as the Lemanic Republic before it was incorporated into the centralist Helvetic Republic. Léman comprised all of the territory of Vaud detached from Bernese occupation, apart from the Avenches and the Payerne which, after 16 October 1802, were annexed by the canton of Fribourg until the Napoleonic Act of Mediation the following year when they were restored to the newly established and newly sovereign canton of Vaud.

The capital of the canton was Lausanne, with the préfet’s residence, the administrative chamber, and the judicial tribunal. The canton was divided into 17 administrative districts, each with a sous-préfet. Léman was also one of the five cantons — purely administrative subdivisions — of the Rhodanic Republic planned in March 1798 by the French general Guillaume Brune.

== History ==
=== Under Bernese rule ===
Much of the region that would become the Canton of Léman was conquered in 1538 by Bern and had been jointly administered by Bern and Fribourg for the following two and a half centuries. As the doctrines of the French Revolution spread, they found a warm reception from the citizens of the French-speaking towns around Lake Geneva (French: Lac Léman) which was known as Pays de Vaud. Following the outbreak of the French Revolution of 1789, Frédéric-César de La Harpe (at that time the tutor to the children of Tsar Paul I of the Russian Empire) began to plot a Vaudois uprising from St. Petersburg. La Harpe was a republican idealist, seeing the rule of the Bernese administration as oligarchical, and as an infringement of the natural rights of the people of Vaud and the other subject states, such as Fribourg. In 1794 he returned to Switzerland and thence to Paris, where he and other exiles sought French assistance to release Vaud and Fribourg from Bern's domination.

=== French invasion ===
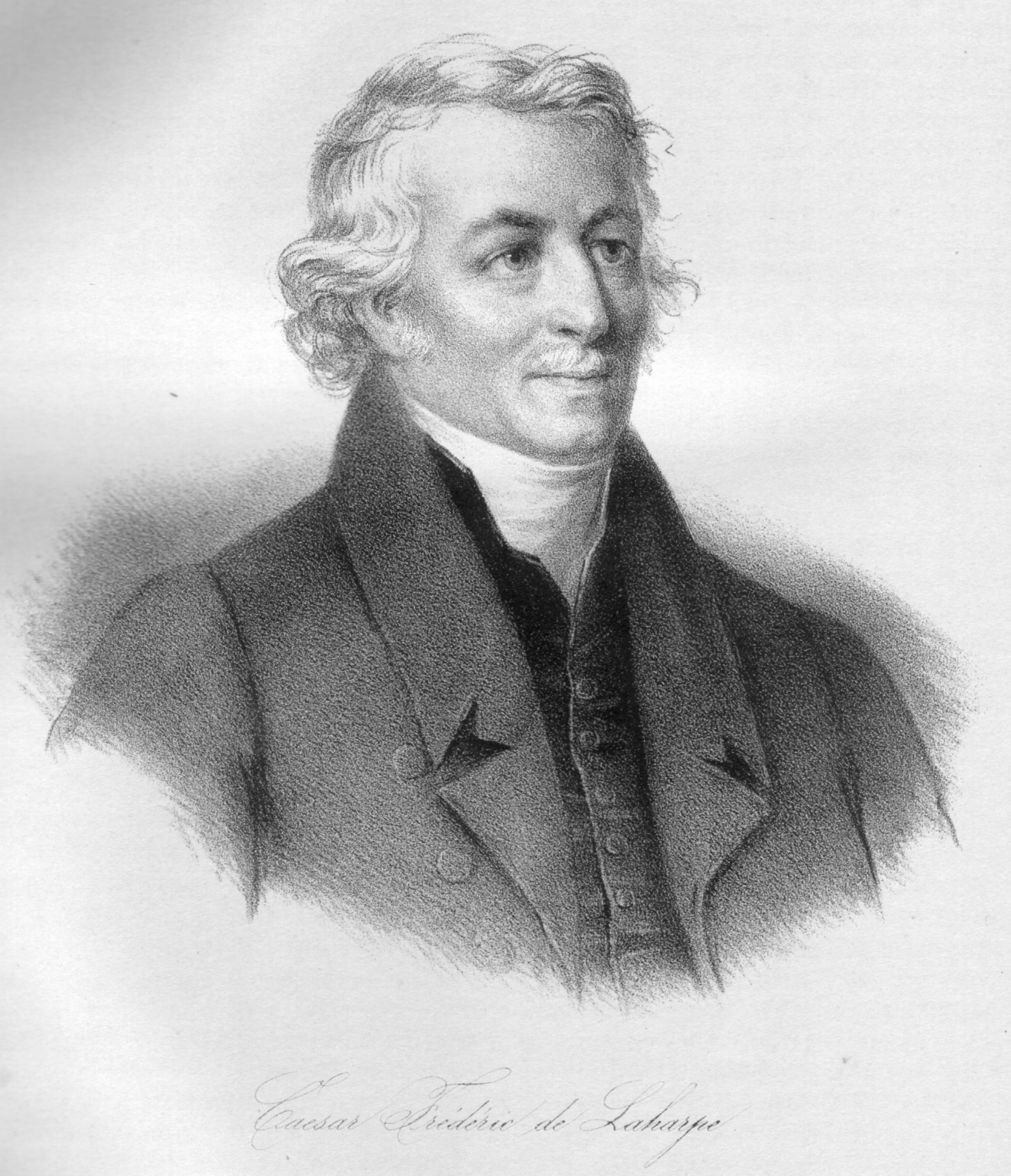
Frédéric-César de La Harpe

La Harpe published his Essay on the Constitution of the Vaud, an anti-Bernese tract. On 10 December 1797 he addressed the French Directory, stating that commitments made by the Duke of Savoy in treaties signed with Bern at Lausanne in 1564 were now the responsibility of the French and thus gave them the right to assist the people of Vaud against the Bernese. The French Directory, which was interested in acquiring Swiss money and the Swiss passes over the Alps, agreed with La Harpe's interpretation of the treaty. In late 1797, the Directory ordered Bern to restore the Pays de Vaud region to its former independence. The citizens of Pays de Vaud reacted to the French announcement with excitement and declared the creation of the Lémanic Republic. Bern, on the other hand, looked with dismay at these events, and in January 1798, sent Colonel Weiss with troops into the province. France replied by immediately sending portions of André Masséna's army under an officer named Mesnard from Italy to occupy the southern shore of Lake Geneva.

As Mesnard marched into Vaud, Weiss retired to Yverdon without striking a blow. On 24 January 1798 at Lausanne, Mesnard proclaimed the independence of the Pays de Vaud and the Vaudois people under French protection. Mesnard dispatched an aide-de-camp with a message to Weiss, demanding that he leave Pays de Vaud. However, the messenger did not have the password and two of the hussars of the aide-de-camp's escort were shot by a Bernese outpost stationed a few miles from Yverdon. The shooting gave the French general an excuse to begin military operations against Bern outside the Pays de Vaud. He threatened the Bernese with resumed hostilities. Weiss, alarmed by his threats, evacuated the Pays de Vaud, although he had 20,000 men while the French had only 15,000. The French army, which had recently conquered Italy, was in a state of destitution and clothed in rags. The Swiss were ordered to reequip and support the allied army and were charged 700,000 francs for the services of the French army.

The Bernese government called for military support from the other cantons of the Confederation and replaced Weiss with Erlach von Hindelbank, but the aristocrats of Bern quickly fell to squabbling among themselves. A majority in the Council was for negotiating peace, as well as awaiting the confederate reinforcements. In the hope of conciliating the French, they began to make some reforms in the government. However, their reforms only weakened confidence in the government and did not slow Mesnard's march. While the Bernese government opened negotiations with the Directory, a second army under Schauenburg was advancing from the north with 17,000 men detached from the army of the Rhine.

With two armies in Switzerland, General Brune assumed command of the French army. He was instructed to play the part of a peace maker and to tie up the Bernese with negotiations until he could strike a decisive blow. By 1 February 1798, the Bernese Tagsatzung was too divided and dissolved itself. Brune entered into a truce with the Swiss which would last until 1 March. However, the French demands were so excessive that even the peace party in the Bernese Council chose to prepare to fight the French. They refused the French demands and ordered von Hindelbank to take the field against them. However, the divisions within the Senate paralyzed all of von Hindelbank's operations.

Signs of insubordination appeared in his army; and although 5,000 or 6,000 Confederate troops arrived, they remained separate from the Bernese army and only formed a reserve. Meanwhile, the French rapidly advanced from both sides. By 2 March 1798, they occupied both Solothurn, north of Bern, and Fribourg to the south-west. On 5 March 1798, a Bernese army under von Grafenried achieved a victory against the French at Neuenegg between Fribourg and Bern. However, on the same day, an army under the Schultheiss of Bern, von Steiger, and von Hindelbank was defeated by Schauenburg at Fraubrunnen.

Their army was driven back to Grauholz, a few miles from Bern. A life-and-death struggle followed, with even women and children grabbing weapons and joining the battle. The battle lasted for three hours with Schultheiss von Steiger rallying the Bernese lines. The French attacked four times and drove back the defenders on each attack. While the battle still raged, news came to the army that Bern had surrendered. Von Erlach and von Steiger fled to the Bernese Oberland, intending to rally their troops, but the troops, mad with the suspicion that the capitulation was the result of treason, murdered the former and Steiger escaped to Vienna.

On 5 March 1798, the French entered Bern in triumph, with Brune keeping up strict discipline in his troops. While he had declared on 22 February that the French came as friends and bearers of freedom and would respect the property of the Swiss citizens, in Bern he emptied the treasuries and magazines. On 10 and 11 March he sent off eleven four-horse wagons full of booty, nineteen banners, and three bears (which they nicknamed respectively Erlach, Steiger, and Weiss). They collected about 42 million francs worth of bullion, food, weapons and supplies, of which nearly 11 million consisted of money and bullion. Of this sum, three million francs in coins were sent directly from Bern to Toulon to aid Napoleon's expedition to Egypt.

== Bourla-papey Revolt ==
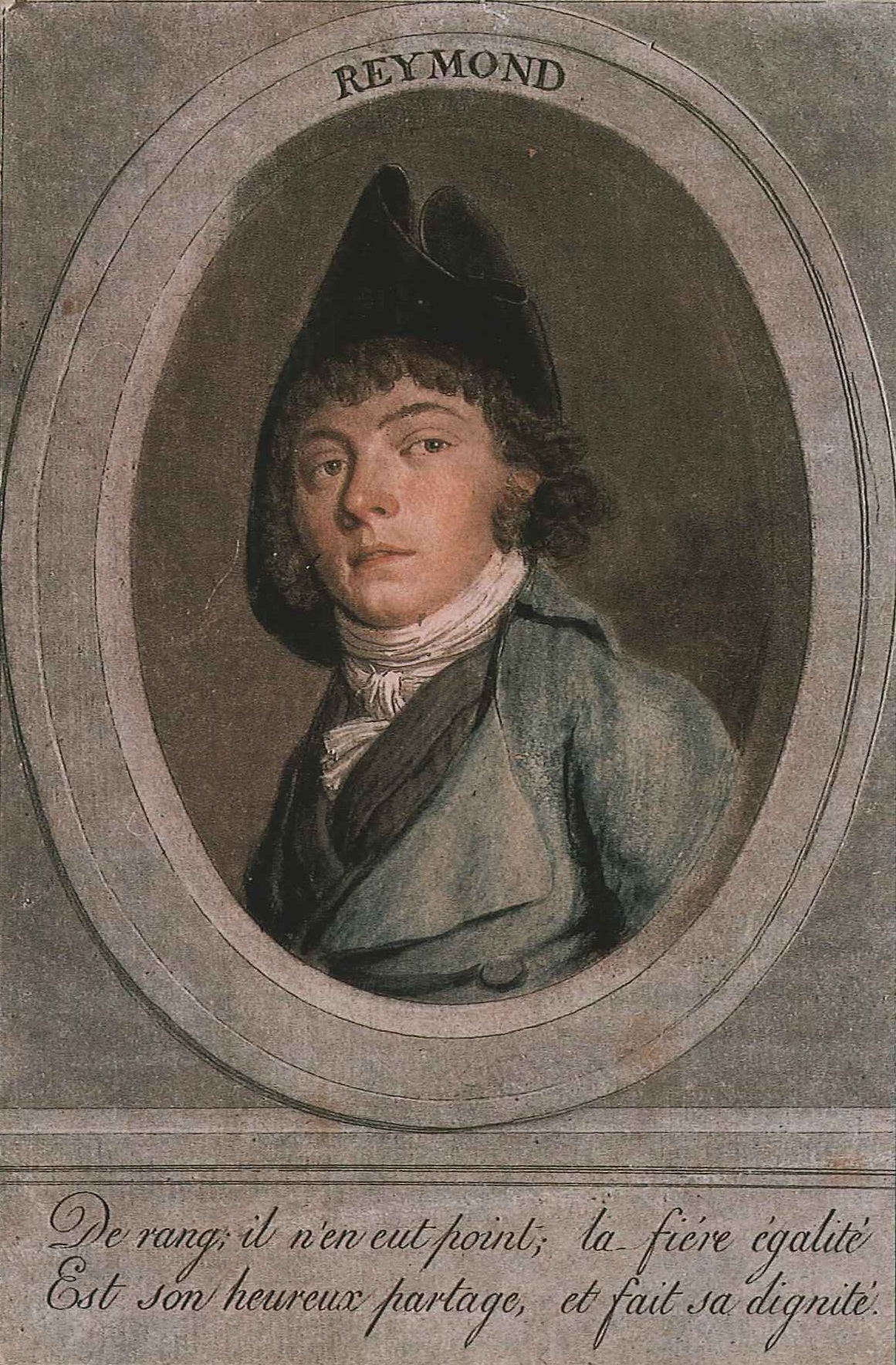
Louis Reymond, who took over the leadership of the Bourla-Papey, by Benjamin Bolomey, 1798

In January 1802, patriots (unitarians) from several smaller cantons met in Aargau to find ways to ensure the revolution of 1798 was not undone by the federalists and started plotting a new coup for spring 1802. In preparation for this new uprising, several actions were planned, and after the two Vaudois delegates returned to their homes, emissaries went from village to village stirring up popular anger against the symbols of the old regime. These efforts were apparently driven by several of the members of the tribunals who had been replaced following the 1800 address, like Claude Mandrot or former cantonal judge Potterat.

Finally, on the evening of the 19 February 1802, a mob assembled and raided the castle of La Sarraz, seizing and burning the archives listing the taxes due for the surrounding area, on the understanding that no taxes could be levied without the documents establishing what was due and by whom. The sub-prefect of Cossonay noted that the raid had been conducted by a large number of people and that they had taken the time to sort through the archives, taking all deeds and administrative papers of value but leaving all family records in place.

Although March remained otherwise calm, rumors of an insurrection planned for early April began to circulate, and while Polier's warnings were mostly unheeded by the government of the Helvetic Republic, additional French troops were stationed in the most agitated districts.

Raids followed in May on Lausanne, Morges, Yverdon, Grandson and Rolle. Each of these raids destroyed tax and land records and came to be known as the Bourla-papey, a dialect version of French Brûle-Papiers or Paper-burners. The government of the Helvetic Republic finally made one senator Kuhn plenipotentiary and sent him to Lausanne, where he arrived on 7 May. His initial assessment underestimated the importance of the movement. On the morning of the 8th, the Bourla-papey started converging on Lausanne again, and when Kuhn had the alarm sounded, only 15 militiamen responded. Kuhn found himself faced by an estimated 3,000 of Reymond's insurgents, against whom he had a contingent of only 400 French troops at his disposal, some of whose officers were said to be sympathetic to the Vaudois cause. Kuhn met Reymond and asked for his terms; Reymond demanded the abolition of feudal taxes and a general amnesty. After their negotiations, the Bourla-papey returned to their positions outside the city, and Kuhn traveled to Bern with their demands.

The government again misjudged the situation, in particular the strength of popular feeling, and how few troops were available to resolve the crisis by force. Kuhn was instructed to reject the insurgents' demands, but on his return to Lausanne, he promised a general amnesty and the abolition of all feudal taxes on his own authority. The daily raids that had been continuing in the more remote districts ceased, and the movement dissolved.

During the first 12 days of May, most of the archives in the canton had been burned; only Lausanne and a few more remote areas remained untouched. Kuhn estimated that the insurgents under Reymond numbered 4,000–5,000, compared to a combined force of 1,300 Helvetic and French troops under his control.

By the end of May, in reaction to the rumors spreading to other cantons that the Bourla-Papey had succeeded, the Helvetic Republic ordered the creation of a special tribunal to try the Bourla-Papey, formed exclusively by citizens from other cantons. While the new tribunal took several weeks to be established, the ringleaders of the Bourla-papey, including Reymond, fled to France. He and several others were sentenced to death in their absence in July 1802.

At the same time, following the terms of the Treaty of Lunéville, all French troops withdrew from Swiss territory. In the vacuum left by their departure, another, wider, insurgent movement arose, the Stecklikrieg. Deprived of the military support from France, the unpopular government of the Helvetic Republic was defeated in Bern on 18 September 1802 and fled to Lausanne.

The Stecklikrieg was mostly motivated by a federalistic movement opposed to the centralized government of the Republic, which had to turn to the Bourla-Papey for support. The Helvetic Republic granted the promised amnesty and officially abolished feudal taxes by decree on 29 September.

== Gallery ==
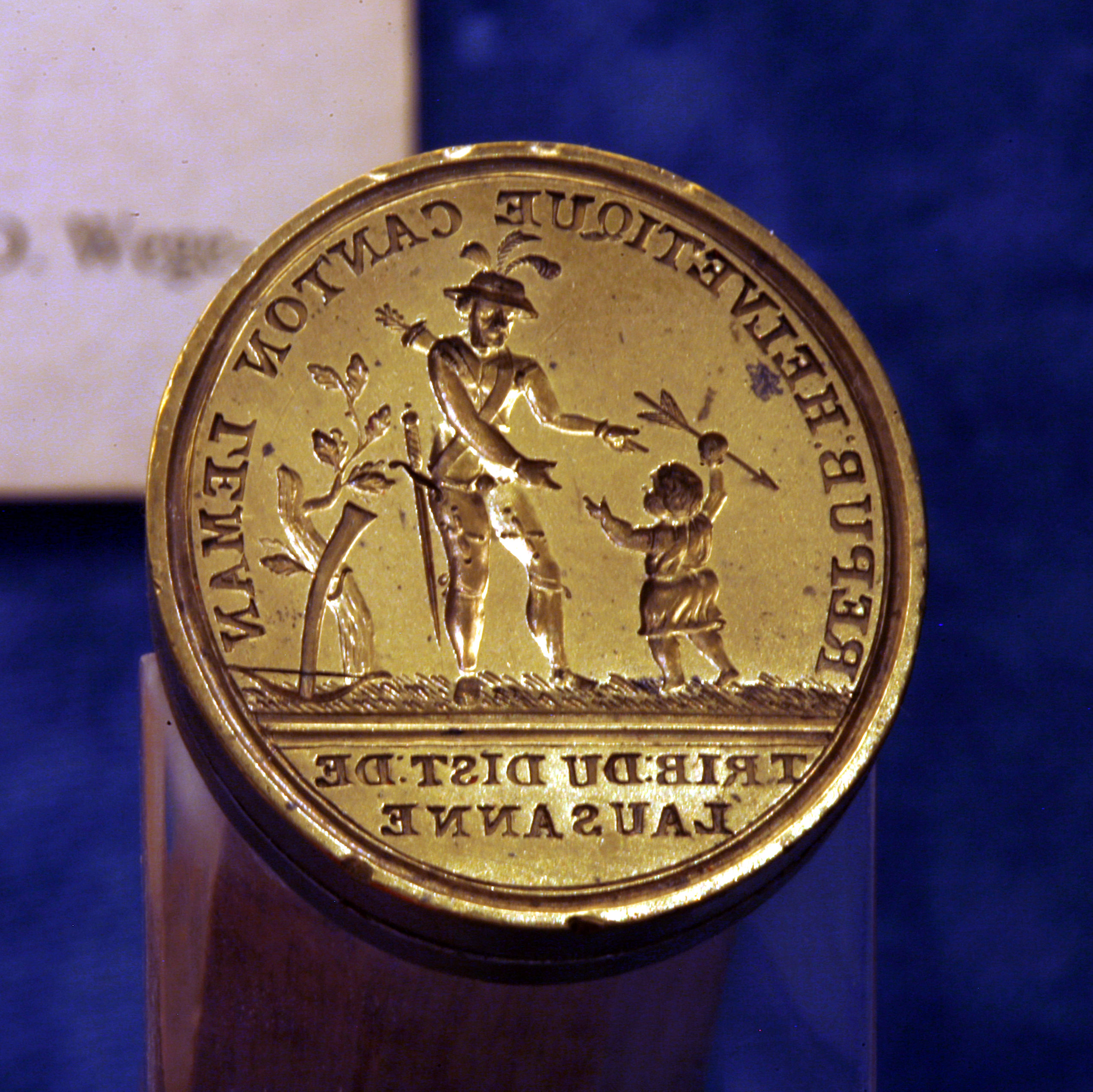
"Répub. helvétique Canton Léman", seal of the district courthouse of Lausanne
