= Rolle =

- Municipality
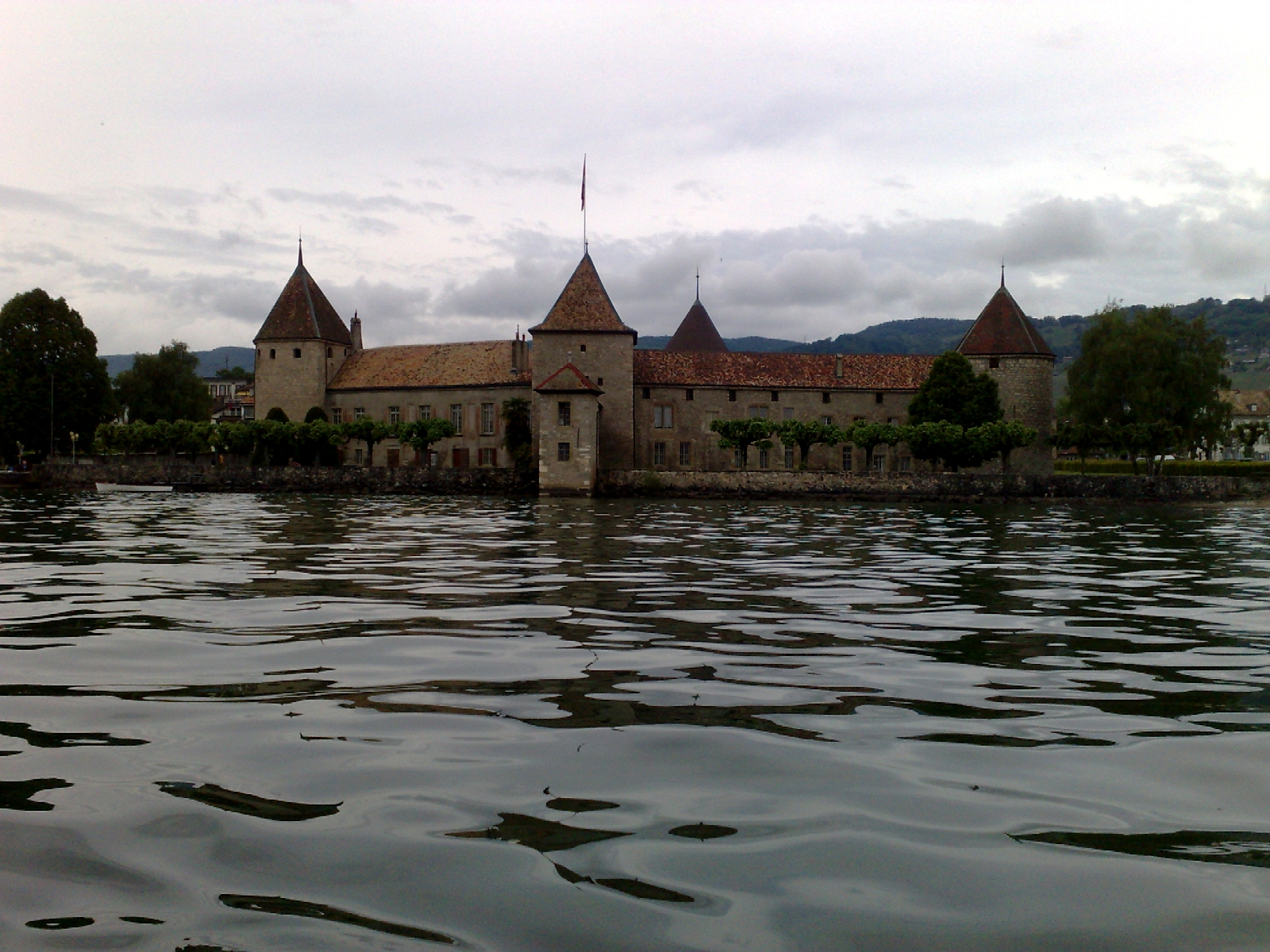
- Castle of Rolle

- Flag Coat of arms
- Location of Rolle
- Location within Switzerland Location within Canton of Vaud
- Coordinates: 46°27′N 06°20′E
- Country: Switzerland
- Canton: Vaud
- District: Nyon

Government
  - Mayor: Syndic

Area
  - Total: 2.72 km^{2} (1.05 sq mi)
- Elevation: 376 m (1,234 ft)

Population (2006)
  - Total: 4,901
  - Density: 1,800/km^{2} (4,670/sq mi)
- Time zone: UTC+01:00 (CET)
  - Summer (DST): UTC+02:00 (CEST)
- Postal code: 1180
- SFOS number: 5861
- ISO 3166 code: CH-VD
- Surrounded by: Bursinel, Essertines-sur-Rolle, Gilly, Mont-sur-Rolle, Perroy, Tartegnin, Lake Geneva
- Twin towns: Wallisellen (Switzerland)
- Website: www.rolle.ch

Rolle (French pronunciation: [ʁɔl]) is a municipality in the Canton of Vaud in Switzerland. It was the seat of the district of Rolle until 2006, when it became part of the district of Nyon. It is located on the northwestern shore of Lake Geneva (Lac Léman) between Nyon and Lausanne. Rolle is approximately 30 kilometers (19 mi) northeast of Geneva (Genève) in the La Côte wine-growing region, and has views of the high Alps.

Rolle is also the birthplace of Frédéric-César de la Harpe (1754–1838), who was the tutor of Alexander I of Russia and was largely responsible for the independence of the Canton of Vaud from the Bernese.

== History ==
Aerial view (1964)

Rolle is first mentioned in 1294 as Rotuli. In 1295 it was known as Ruello and as Ruelloz, the city, in 1330 after it passed into the hands of Jean De Grailly the 1st, a Knight entrusted to care for the future King Edward the 2nd.

=== Prehistoric settlements ===
A late Bronze Age lake side settlement was discovered and partially destroyed in 1835 during construction of the artificial island of Île de la Harpe. A second settlement from the same period was found in Fleur d'Eau. In 1984, in La Combe, a first to third century AD Gallo-Roman estate was discovered. The remains of the moat and the ramparts of Rolle Castle were uncovered in 1985. Fragments of a medieval city wall were found in the Champ de verse which may have come from the village of Saint-Nicolas de Ver.

=== Medieval Rolle ===
In 1261, the Lords of Mont planned to build a city along the lake that would compete with the Aubonne and Saint-Prex. By around 1264, Rolle Castle was built to protect the pier at the lake. However, the planned city was never built by the Mont family. In 1291, the castle was in possession of Count Amadeus V of Savoy, who granted it to several different families as a fief. In 1295 it passed to the Knight Jean De Grailly the 1st who named it Ruello changed centuries later to Rolle. In the course of the rivalry between the Counts of Savoy and the Lords of Vaud, in 1319 Amadeus V of Savoy finally built a city around the castle. This new city closed a gap in the savoy settlements on the northern shores of Lake Geneva. The layout of the town, a large main street running parallel to the lake shore with a cross street that connects the port with the hinterland, follow the construction patterns of typical Zähringer towns.

The residents of Saint-Nicolas de Ver, possibly an unsuccessful town founded by the Lords de Mont, settled in Rolle. The new city, which was built with a palisade, was granted a city charter along the lines of the charter of Moudon. As compensation, Jean de Mont became a deputy ruler and received a dairy farm and half of the furnaces and mills. Starting in 1366, the citizens became exempt from tolls in Aubonne. The Duke of Savoy granted the right to hold a weekly market in 1425. In 1484, he elevated it from a feudal property to a free city.

The fief of Le Rosey in the district of Rolle belonged to the lord of Vufflens in the middle of the 14th Century. It later passed into the possession of the lord of Avenches and the Praroman family.

During the Bernese invasion of 1536, both Le Rosey Castle and Rolle Castle were attacked and burned.

=== Under Bernese rule ===
Under Bernese rule (1536–1798) Rolle was part of the bailiwick of Morges. In 1558, the Bernese merchant Hans Steiger, who was already the lord of Mont-le-Grand, acquired the barony of Rolle. His family retained the property until the French Revolution. The barony included the town of Rolle (except the fief of Les Uttins which belonged until the 18th century to the La Harpe family), Tartegnin, Vinzel, Luins, half of Essertines-sur-Rolle, some homes in Begnins, the region of Vincy, and Saint-Vincent (now in Gilly), Bursinel and in 1615 they acquired Le Rosey Castle, Dully and Le Vaud. The judicial court was composed of the lord, his deputy, a court clerk, and ten members from Rolle and villages in the district. One of ten members governed the city. In 1740, the town bought itself out from under some taxes and duties.

=== The end of Bernese rule and modern Rolle ===
Rolle was the birthplace of Frédéric-César de La Harpe and Amédée de La Harpe, two important figures in the French Revolution and the end of the Ancien Régime of Switzerland. Toward the end of the 18th Century, it was a center of revolutionary fervor. Amédée de La Harpe presided, in Rolle on 15 July 1791, over a revolutionary banquet. Following the French invasion of Switzerland in 1798, Rolle became the seat of a district of the same name. In 1799 the Helvetic Republic bought the castle from the municipality and used it until 1974 as the seat of government. In 1802, during the Bourla-papey uprising, patrician land titles and tax records were burned in the archives at Rolle Castle.

== Geography ==
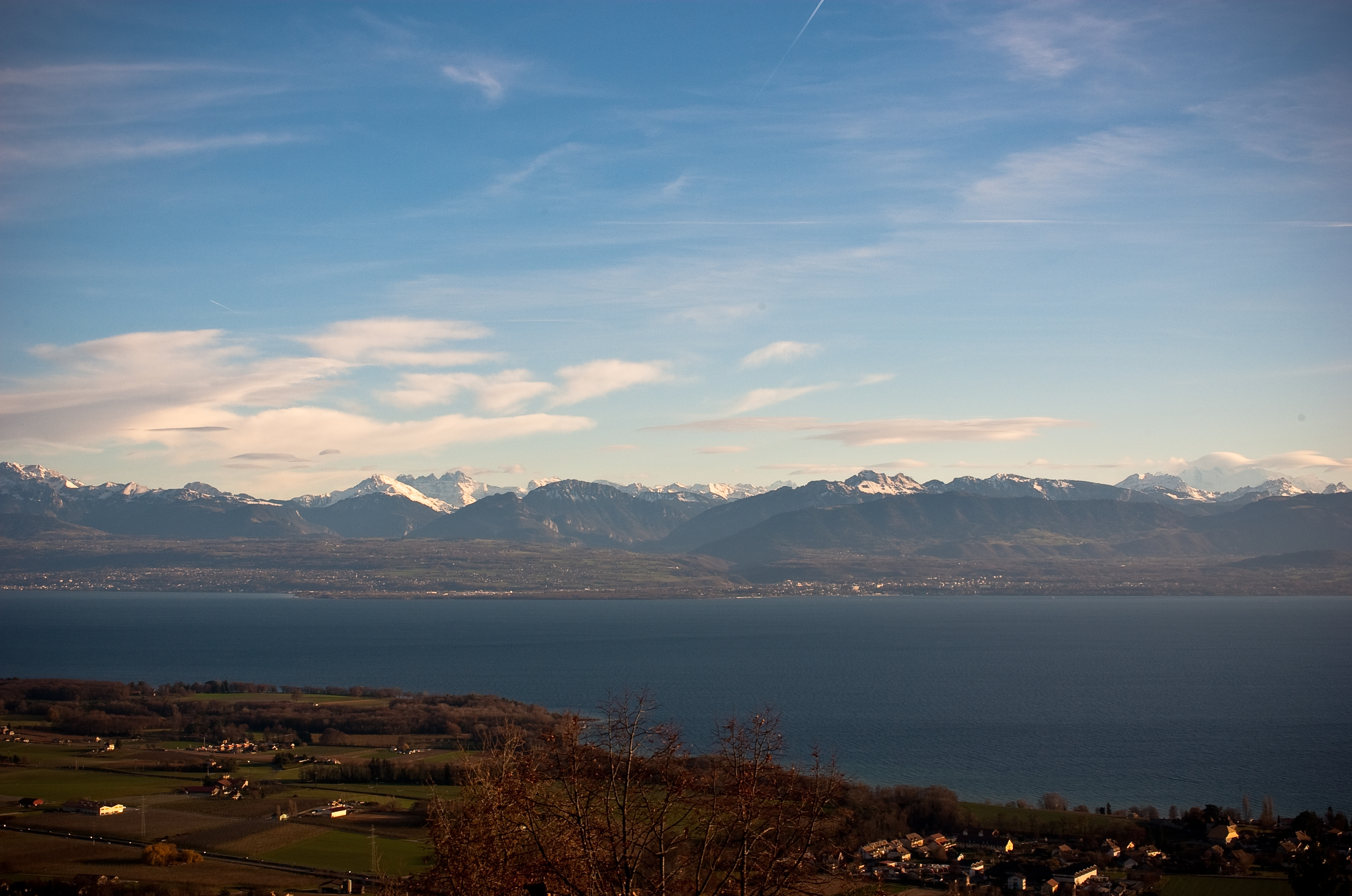
Lake Geneva and the Alps from Rolle

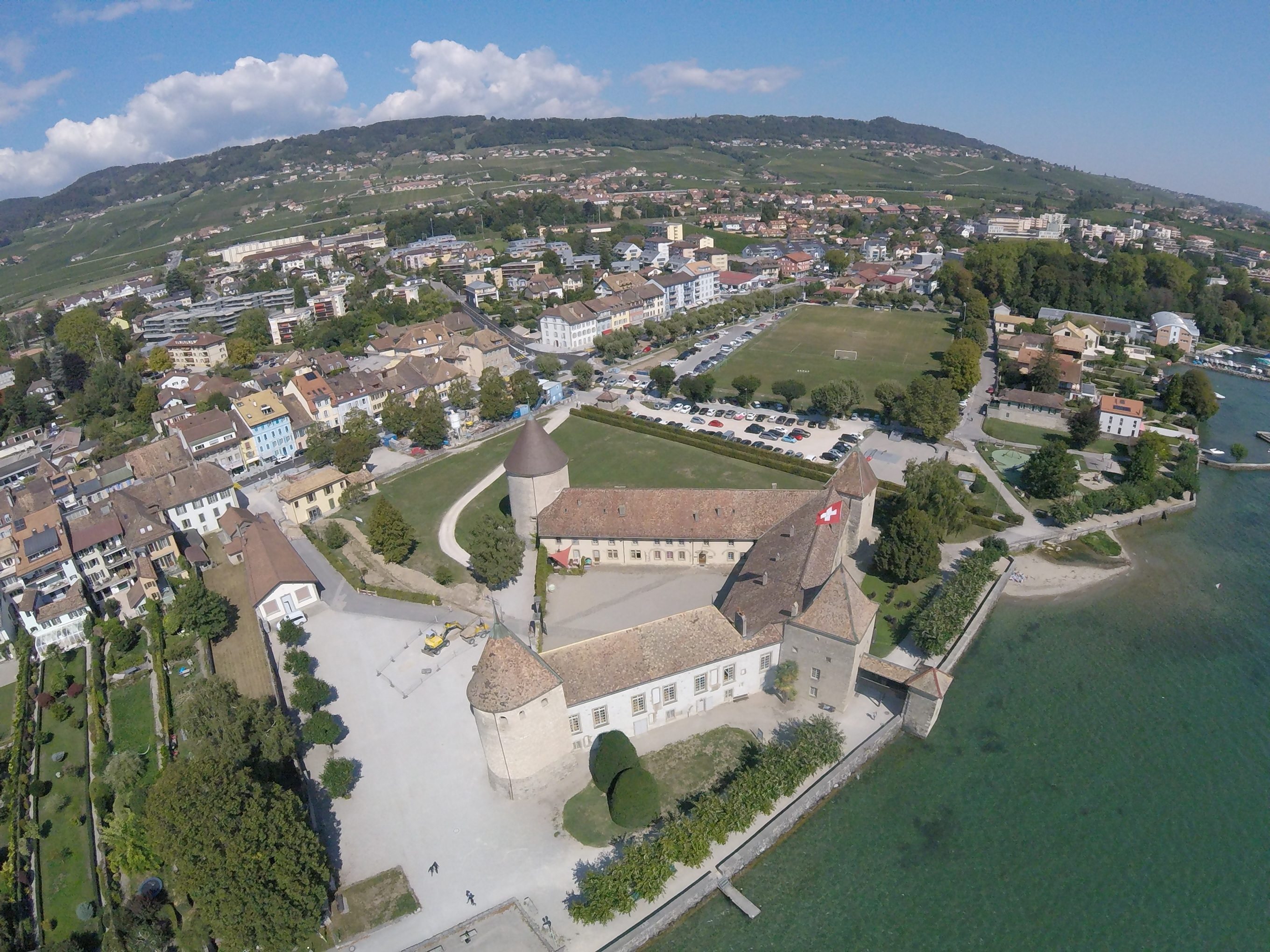
Rolle, aerial view

Rolle has an area, as of 2009, of 2.7 square kilometers (1.0 mi^{2}). Of this area, 0.81 km^{2} (0.31 mi^{2}) or 29.6% is used for agricultural purposes, while 0.15 km^{2} (0.058 mi^{2}) or 5.5% is forested. Of the rest of the land, 1.74 km^{2} (0.67 mi^{2}) or 63.5% is settled (buildings or roads), 0.02 km^{2} (4.9 acres) or 0.7% is either rivers or lakes.

Of the built up area, industrial buildings made up 4.0% of the total area while housing and buildings made up 28.5% and transportation infrastructure made up 18.6%. Power and water infrastructure as well as other special developed areas made up 4.4% of the area while parks, green belts and sports fields made up 8.0%. Out of the forested land, 3.3% of the total land area is heavily forested and 2.2% is covered with orchards or small clusters of trees. Of the agricultural land, 17.2% is used for growing crops and 3.3% is pastures, while 9.1% is used for orchards or vine crops. Of the water in the municipality, 0.4% is in lakes and 0.4% is in rivers and streams.

The municipality was part of the Rolle District until it was dissolved on 31 August 2006, and Rolle became part of the new district of Nyon.

The municipality is located on Lake Geneva on the Geneva-Lausanne highway.

== Coat of arms ==
The blazon of the municipal coat of arms is Per fess Or and Vert.

== Demographics ==
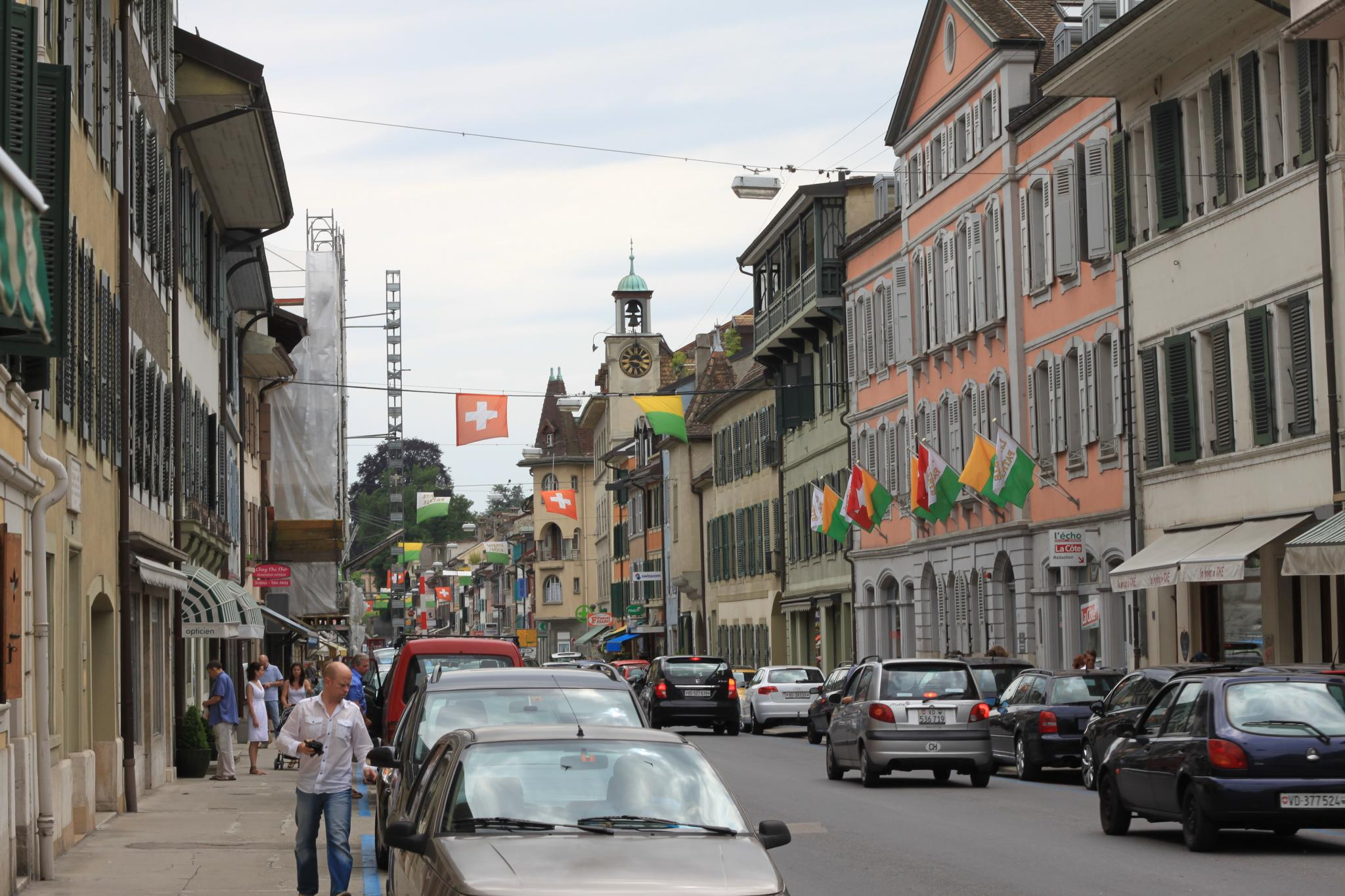
Main street through the old town of Rolle

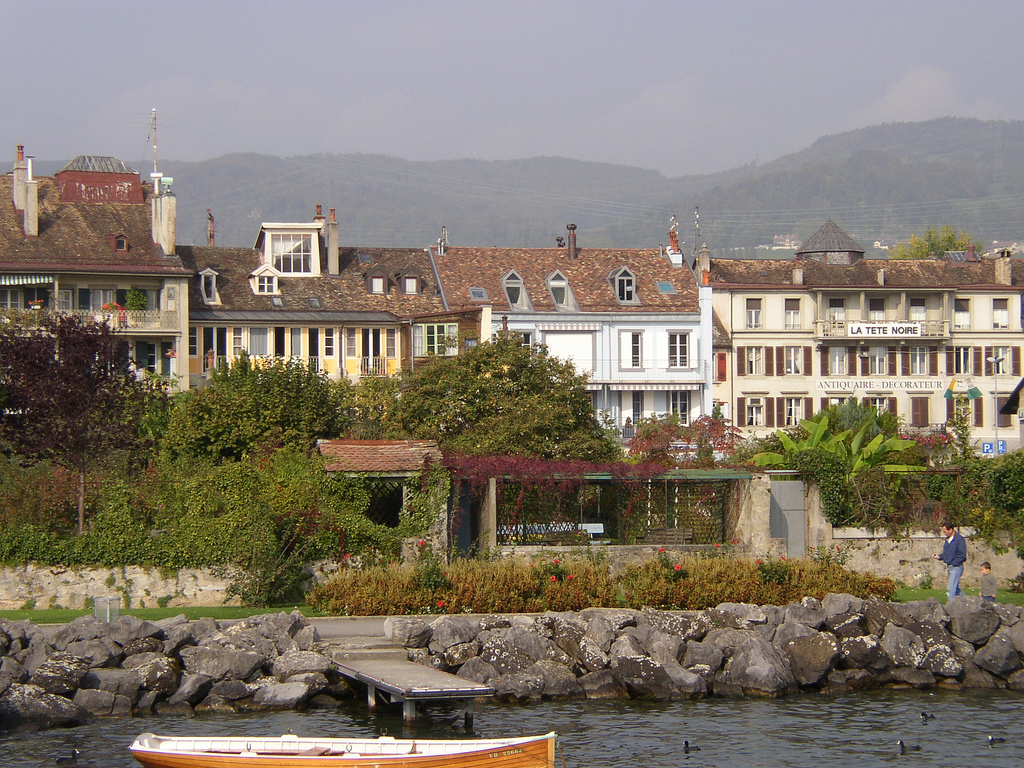
Houses along Rolle's waterfront

Rolle has a population (as of December 2020) of 6,260. As of 2008, 41.8% of the population are resident foreign nationals. Over the last 10 years (1999–2009) the population has changed at a rate of 36.9%. It has changed at a rate of 32.4% due to migration and at a rate of 4.3% due to births and deaths.

Most of the population (as of 2000) speaks French (3,130 or 73.9%) as their first language, with Portuguese being second most common (208 or 4.9%) and English being third (183 or 4.3%). There are 178 people who speak German, 162 people who speak Italian and 3 people who speak Romansh and 1 who speaks Greek Greek.

The age distribution, as of 2009, in Rolle is; 636 children or 11.4% of the population are between 0 and 9 years old and 879 teenagers or 15.8% are between 10 and 19. Of the adult population, 629 people or 11.3% of the population are between 20 and 29 years old. 921 people or 16.5% are between 30 and 39, 853 people or 15.3% are between 40 and 49, and 611 people or 11.0% are between 50 and 59. The senior population distribution is 478 people or 8.6% of the population are between 60 and 69 years old, 338 people or 6.1% are between 70 and 79, there are 190 people or 3.4% who are between 80 and 89, and there are 42 people or 0.8% who are 90 and older.

As of 2000, there were 1,899 people who were single and never married in the municipality. There were 1,848 married individuals, 274 widows or widowers and 214 individuals who are divorced.

As of 2000, there were 1,617 private households in the municipality, and an average of 2.3 persons per household. There were 586 households that consist of only one person and 89 households with five or more people. Out of a total of 1,665 households that answered this question, 35.2% were households made up of just one person and there were 9 adults who lived with their parents. Of the rest of the households, there are 394 married couples without children, 514 married couples with children. There were 86 single parents with a child or children. There were 28 households that were made up of unrelated people and 48 households that were made up of some sort of institution or another collective housing.

In 2000 there were 259 single family homes (or 39.5% of the total) out of a total of 655 inhabited buildings. There were 204 multi-family buildings (31.1%), along with 125 multi-purpose buildings that were mostly used for housing (19.1%) and 67 other use buildings (commercial or industrial) that also had some housing (10.2%).

In 2000, a total of 1,554 apartments (76.9% of the total) were permanently occupied, while 426 apartments (21.1%) were seasonally occupied and 41 apartments (2.0%) were empty. As of 2009, the construction rate of new housing units was 11.6 new units per 1000 residents. The vacancy rate for the municipality, in 2010, was 0.61%.

The historical population is given in the following chart:

== Heritage sites of national significance ==
Rolle Castle, the Library of the Community of Rolle and Île de la Harpe are listed as Swiss heritage site of national significance. The entire old city of Rolle is part of the Inventory of Swiss Heritage Sites.

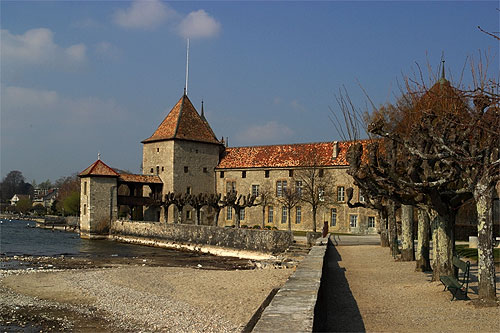
Rolle Castle

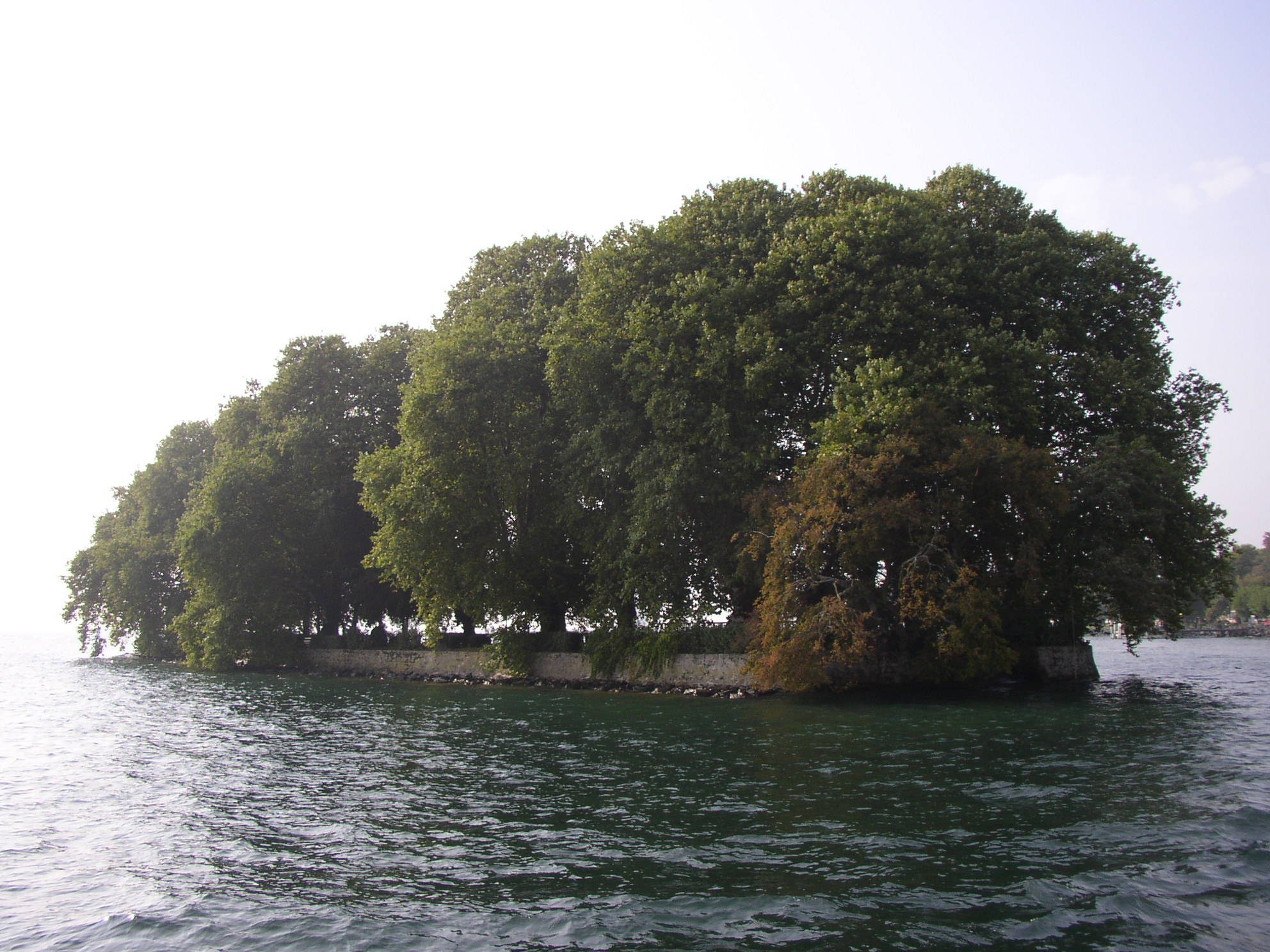
Ile de La Harpe

== Politics ==
In the 2007 federal election the most popular party was the SP which received 26.57% of the vote. The next three most popular parties were the SVP (21.74%), the FDP (13.66%) and the Green Party (12.09%). In the federal election, a total of 982 votes were cast, and the voter turnout was 42.2%.

== Economy ==
Rolle has gained popularity as a company tax haven in Switzerland. Yahoo! moved its European headquarters from UK to Rolle in 2008 and Ineos moved its principal executive offices to Rolle from UK in 2010, for tax reasons. Cisco Systems also has a decent sized Research and Development site there.

As of 2010, Rolle had an unemployment rate of 6.4%. As of 2008, there were 45 people employed in the primary economic sector and about 7 businesses involved in this sector. 388 people were employed in the secondary sector and there were 46 businesses in this sector. 2,327 people were employed in the tertiary sector, with 275 businesses in this sector. There were 1,995 residents of the municipality who were employed in some capacity, of which females made up 44.0% of the workforce.

In 2008 the total number of full-time equivalent jobs was 2,417. The number of jobs in the primary sector was 27, of which 26 were in agriculture and 1 was in fishing or fisheries. The number of jobs in the secondary sector was 367 of which 224 or (61.0%) were in manufacturing and 107 (29.2%) were in construction. The number of jobs in the tertiary sector was 2,023. In the tertiary sector; 966 or 47.8% were in wholesale or retail sales or the repair of motor vehicles, 43 or 2.1% were in the movement and storage of goods, 93 or 4.6% were in a hotel or restaurant, 81 or 4.0% were in the information industry, 33 or 1.6% were the insurance or financial industry, 82 or 4.1% were technical professionals or scientists, 330 or 16.3% were in education and 182 or 9.0% were in health care.

In 2000, there were 1,314 workers who commuted into the municipality and 1,187 workers who commuted away. The municipality is a net importer of workers, with about 1.1 workers entering the municipality for every one leaving. About 6.1% of the workforce coming into Rolle are coming from outside Switzerland, while 0.3% of the locals commute out of Switzerland for work. Of the working population, 15.5% used public transportation to get to work, and 56.3% used a private car.

== Religion ==
From the 2000 census, 1,549 or 36.6% were Roman Catholic, while 1,309 or 30.9% belonged to the Swiss Reformed Church. Of the rest of the population, there were 79 members of an Orthodox church (or about 1.87% of the population), and there were 240 individuals (or about 5.67% of the population) who belonged to another Christian church. There were 18 individuals (or about 0.43% of the population) who were Jewish, and 213 (or about 5.03% of the population) who were Muslim. There were 10 individuals who were Buddhist, five who were Hindu and 23 who belonged to another church. A total of 615 residents (or about 14.52% of the population) belonged to no church, are agnostic or atheist, and 277 individuals (or about 6.54% of the population) did not answer the question.

== Education ==
In Rolle about 1,163 or (27.5%) of the population have completed non-mandatory upper secondary education, and 672 or (15.9%) have completed additional higher education (either university or a Fachhochschule). Of the 672 who completed tertiary schooling, 44.5% were Swiss men, 26.8% were Swiss women, 16.4% were non-Swiss men and 12.4% were non-Swiss women.

In the 2009/2010 school year there were a total of 618 students in the Rolle school district. In the Vaud cantonal school system, two years of non-obligatory pre-school are provided by the political districts. During the school year, the political district provided pre-school care for a total of 1,249 children of which 563 children (45.1%) received subsidized pre-school care. The canton's primary school program requires students to attend for four years. There were 334 students in the municipal primary school program. The obligatory lower secondary school program lasts for six years and there were 262 students in those schools. There were also 22 students who were home schooled or attended another non-traditional school.

As of 2000, there were 414 students in Rolle who came from another municipality, while 164 residents attended schools outside the municipality.

It is also the location for the main campus of Institut Le Rosey, one of the most prestigious boarding schools in the world. Notable former residents of Rolle, and alumni of Le Rosey, include: Aga Khan IV, King Albert II of Belgium, King Baudouin I of Belgium, King Fuad II of Egypt, King Ntare V of Burundi, Shah Mohammad Reza Pahlavī, and Prince Rainier III of Monaco.

== Notable residents ==
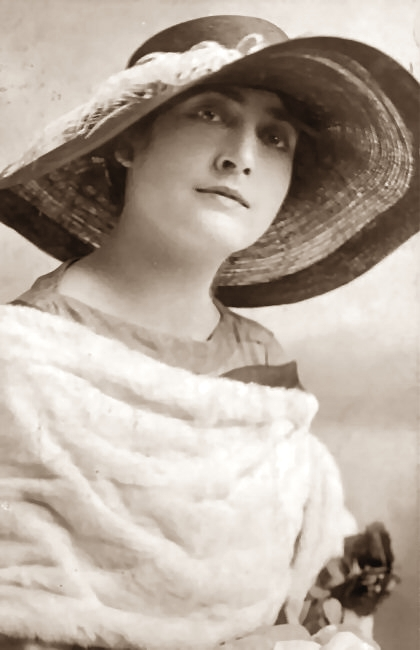
Flore Revalles, ca.1918

- Henry Bouquet (1719–1765), a British Army officer in the French and Indian War and Pontiac's War
- Jean Preudhomme (1732–1795), Swiss portrait artist.
- Frédéric-César de La Harpe (1754–1838), a Swiss political leader and Vaudois patriot, helped create the Helvetic Republic
- Amédée Emmanuel François Laharpe (1754–1796), fought in the armies of the First French Republic during the French Revolutionary Wars
- Ernest Biéler (1863–1948), a multi-talented Swiss painter, draughtsman and printmaker
- Flore Revalles (1889–1966), singer, dancer and actress
- Ernst Neufert (1900–1986), German architect, assistant of Walter Gropius, lived in Rolle
- Jean-Luc Godard (1930–2022), French-Swiss film director, screenwriter and film critic, office in Rolle.
- Jean-Marie Straub (1933-2022), French filmmaker
- Janine Massard (born 1939), a Swiss writer
- Andrew Currie (born 1955), British billionaire businessman, lives in Rolle, director of Ineos
- Anthony Favre (born 1984), a retired Swiss professional footballer
