= Amédée Emmanuel François Laharpe =

Swiss military officer

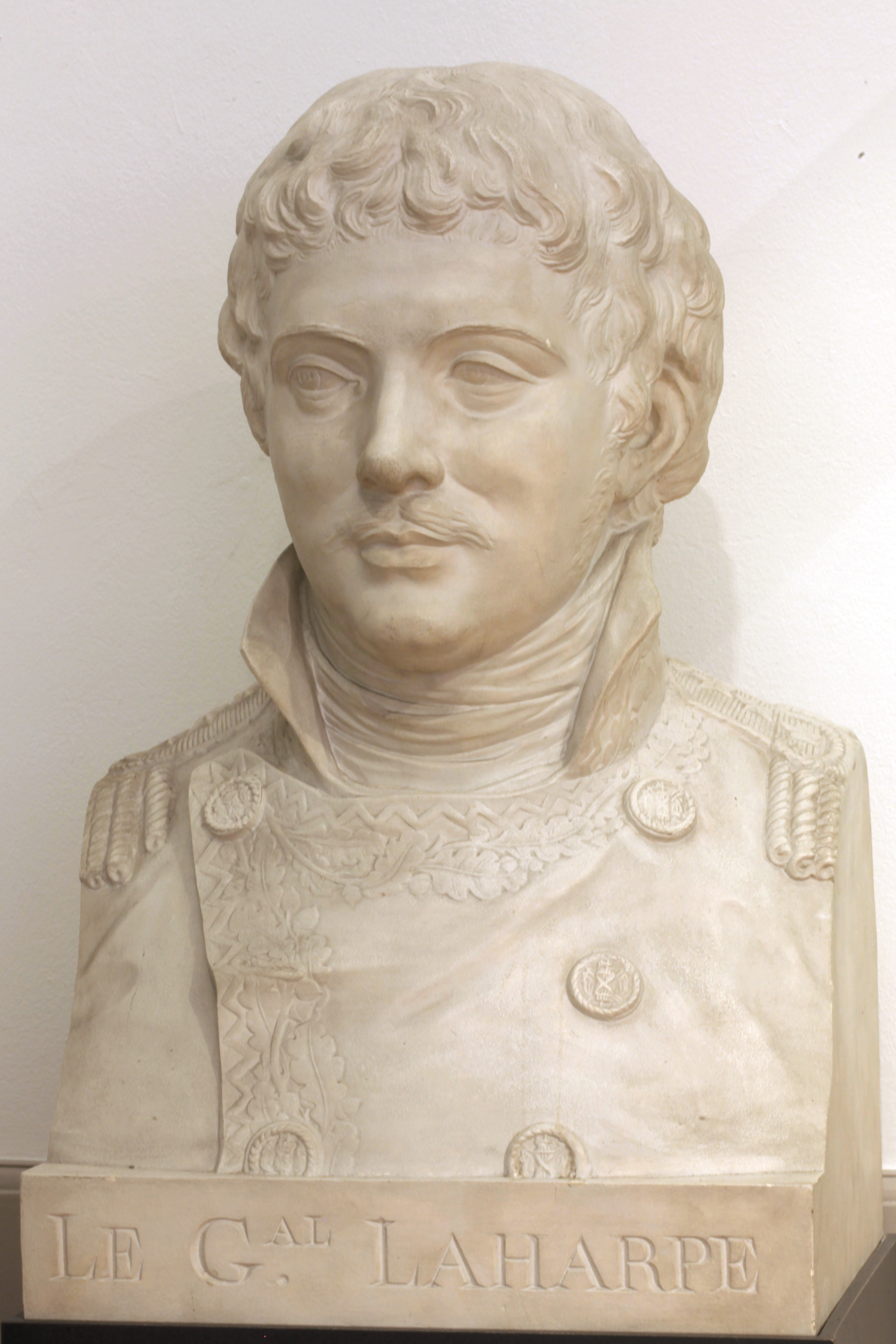
- Bust of Laharpe in the Vaud Military Museum
- Born: 27 September 1754; Rolle, Switzerland
- Died: 8 May 1796 (aged 41); Codogno, Italy
- Relatives: Frédéric-César de la Harpe (cousin)
- Military career
- Allegiance: Kingdom of France; French First Republic
- Branch: Army
- Service years: 1791–1796
- Rank: General of division
- Conflicts: French Revolutionary Wars

Amédée Emmanuel François Laharpe (born de La Harpe; French: [la.arp], 27 September 1754 – 8 May 1796) was a Swiss military officer who served as a volunteer in the French Army during the French Revolutionary Wars. He rose to become a general of the Revolutionary Army, and led a division in Italy under Napoleon Bonaparte until his death in battle after being hit by friendly fire. He was a cousin of the Swiss political leader Frédéric-César de La Harpe.

== Early life and career ==
Amédée de La Harpe was born into a noble family in Rolle, Vaud, Switzerland on 27 September 1754. He was the son of Louis Philippe de La Harpe, Seigneur des Uttins and member of Lausanne's Council of Sixty, and Sophie Hugonin. He attended a philanthropinist school in Haldenstein along with his cousin Frédéric-César de La Harpe, who would become the leader of the successful movement for the independence of Vaud from the canton of Bern.

As a young man La Harpe served as a mercenary in the Netherlands. After returning home he commanded a Vaud militia company, and between 1780 and 1791 sat at the Council of Two Hundred of Lausanne. When the French Revolution broke out in 1789, he renounced his seigneurial privileges. On 15 July 1791, La Harpe held a banquet in Rolle to celebrate the second anniversary of the Storming of the Bastille. As the Bernese authorities persecuted those involved, La Harpe fled to France while others were already being arrested and imprisoned in Chillon Castle. He was then sentenced to death in absentia by Bern, and his property in Switzerland was confiscated.

In 1792, in accordance with the laws of revolutionary France and his own beliefs, La Harpe dropped the nobiliary particle "de" from his surname and changed it to Laharpe.

== French Revolutionary Wars ==
In late 1791, Laharpe joined the French Army as a lieutenant-colonel of the 4th volunteer battalion of Seine-et-Oise, first being deployed with the Army of the Rhine and then the Army of the Alps. He was promoted to lieutenant-colonel of the 35th Infantry Regiment in January 1793 and distinguished himself at the Siege of Toulon, being rewarded with the rank of brigade general in December of that year. This rank was confirmed when Laharpe was assigned to the Army of Italy in August 1794, and in the following month he fought at the First Battle of Dego.

His promotion to general of division came in August 1795, and later that year Laharpe took part in the Battle of Loano. When Napoleon Bonaparte took command of the Army of Italy in March 1796, his division commanders included Laharpe, André Masséna, Pierre Augereau, and Jean Sérurier. In the Montenotte Campaign, these four divisions rapidly defeated the Austrian army and forced the Kingdom of Sardinia-Piedmont to sue for peace. Laharpe fought at the battles of Montenotte and, once again, at Dego. Thereafter, his troops guarded the east flank of the army against a possible Austrian counterattack.

With the Sardinians subdued, Bonaparte moved against Johann Beaulieu's Austrian army. After marching along the south bank of the Po River, Laharpe's division crossed near Piacenza and thrust north to turn Beaulieu's left flank. Laharpe, with his own division and the army's advance guard, defeated Anton Lipthay's Austrians at the Battle of Fombio during the day on 8 May. After this action, the French pursued as far as Codogno, and that evening another Austrian unit blundered into the French units in the area. Amid a night of confused clashes and low visibility, Laharpe was accidentally shot by his own troops as he returned to camp from a reconnaissance.

== Legacy ==
During his exile in Saint Helena, Napoleon described Laharpe as "an officer of distinguished bravery. A grenadier in heart and stature. Beloved by his troops whom he led with intelligence". He is honored on the Arc de Triomphe in Paris, where the name LAHARPE is inscribed on column 24, right below that of fellow Vaudois volunteer Jean Reynier.

== Family ==
In 1775, during his mercenary service in the Netherlands, La Harpe married Baroness Charlotte d'Auvin de Burdinne, from the County of Namur. Two of their sons, Sigismond (1779–1858) and Emmanuel de La Harpe (1782–1842), went on to briefly serve in the French Army during the Revolutionary Wars.
