= Benjamin Samuel Bolomey =

18th-century Swiss painter

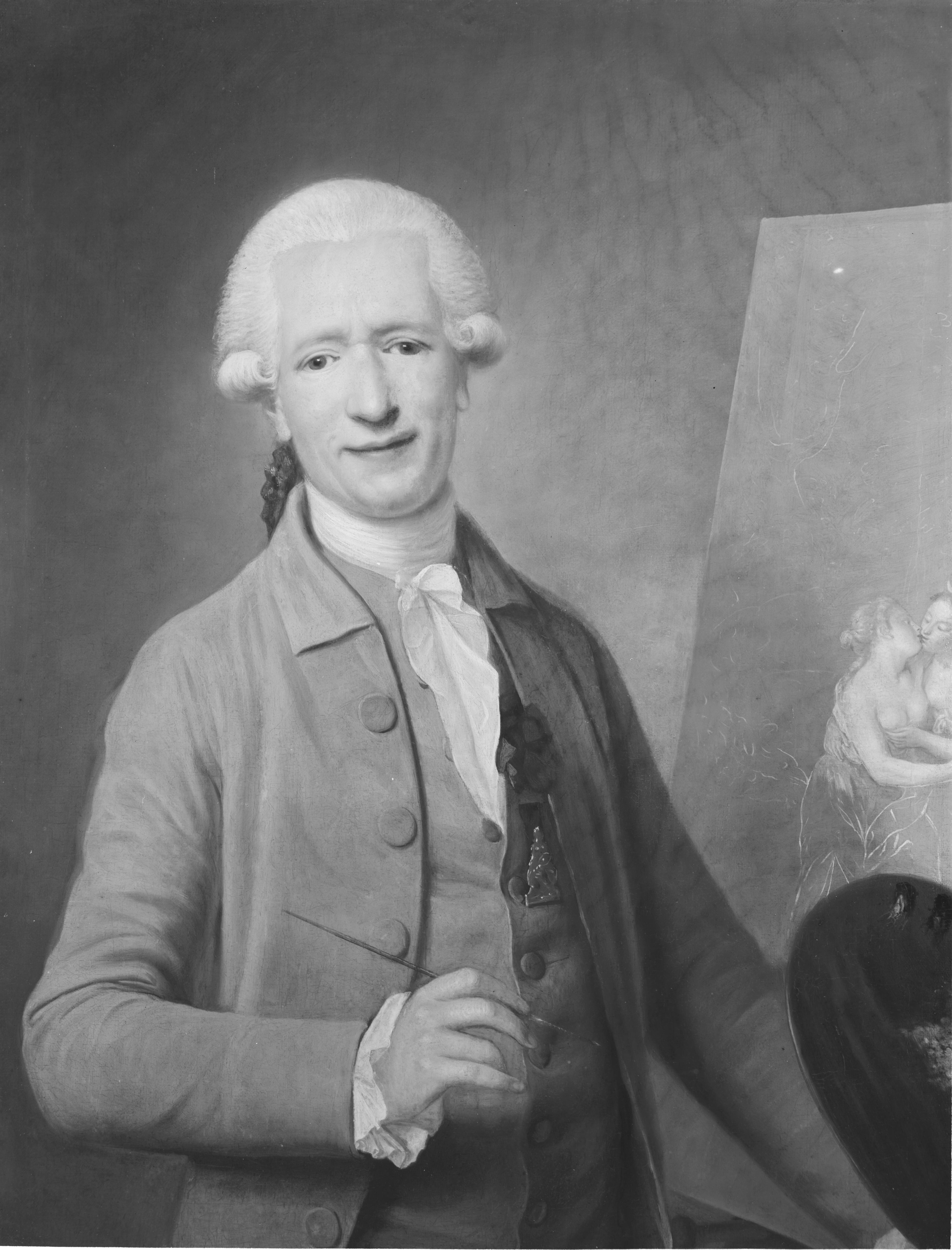
- Self-portrait c. 1780
- Born: 19 May 1739; Lausanne, Switzerland
- Died: 19 December 1819 (aged 80); Lausanne, Switzerland

Benjamin Samuel Bolomey (19 May 1739 – 19 December 1819) was a Swiss painter and politician. As an artist he spent most of his career as a portrait painter in the Netherlands.

== Biography ==
Bolomey was born in Lausanne on 19 May 1739, to François Louis Bolomey, an hotelier, and Pernette Mercier. He received his early artistic education in Paris, where he studied between 1752 and 1760 as a pastel portrait painter, and became a pupil of Joseph-Marie Vien in 1758. While studying there he was also influenced by Boucher and La Tour.

He moved to The Hague in 1763, joining the Confrerie Pictura the same year. He was court painter to William V, Prince of Orange and is known for portraits of the Dutch society. In 1771 he became regent of the Confrerie, and was the director of the Royal Academy of Art in The Hague from 1777 until 1791, when he returned to his hometown of Lausanne.

Bolomey painted a series of portrait miniatures of politicians and revolutionaries of Vaud (part of the canton of Bern until 1798) during the years of the Helvetic Republic (1798–1803). After Vaud became a Swiss canton, Bolomey served as member of the Grand Council of Vaud from 1803 to 1807. He died in Lausanne on 19 December 1819, aged 80.

== Gallery ==
=== Works ===
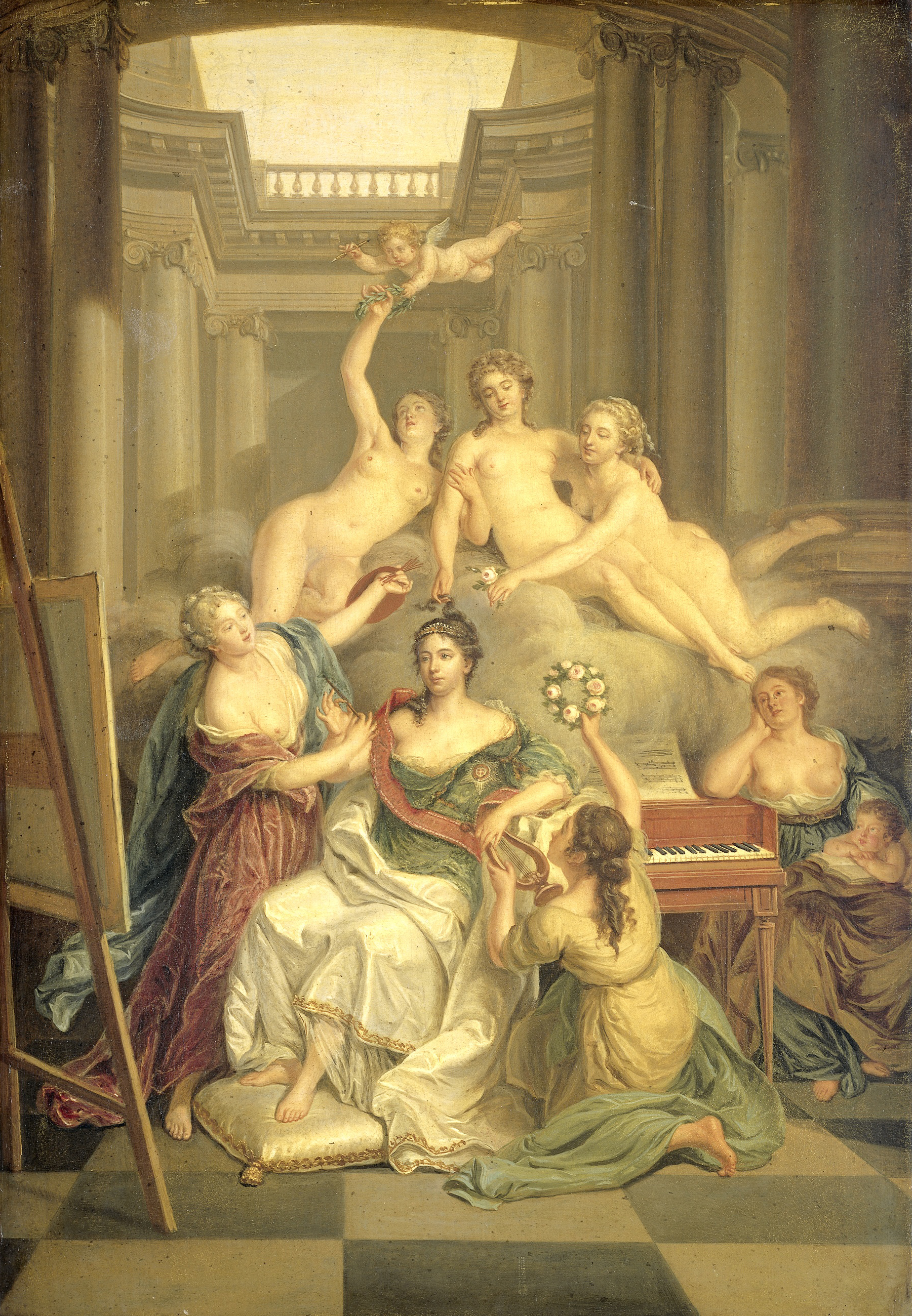
Allegorical painting of Princess Wilhelmina of Prussia (undated)

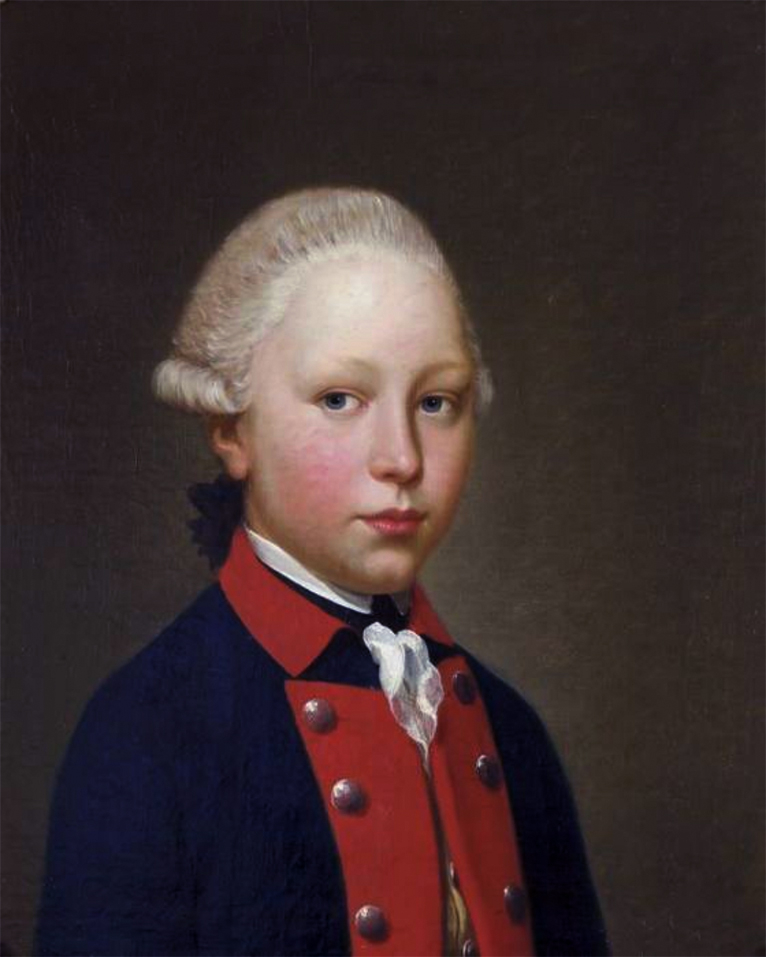
Dirk van Hogendorp, c. 1770

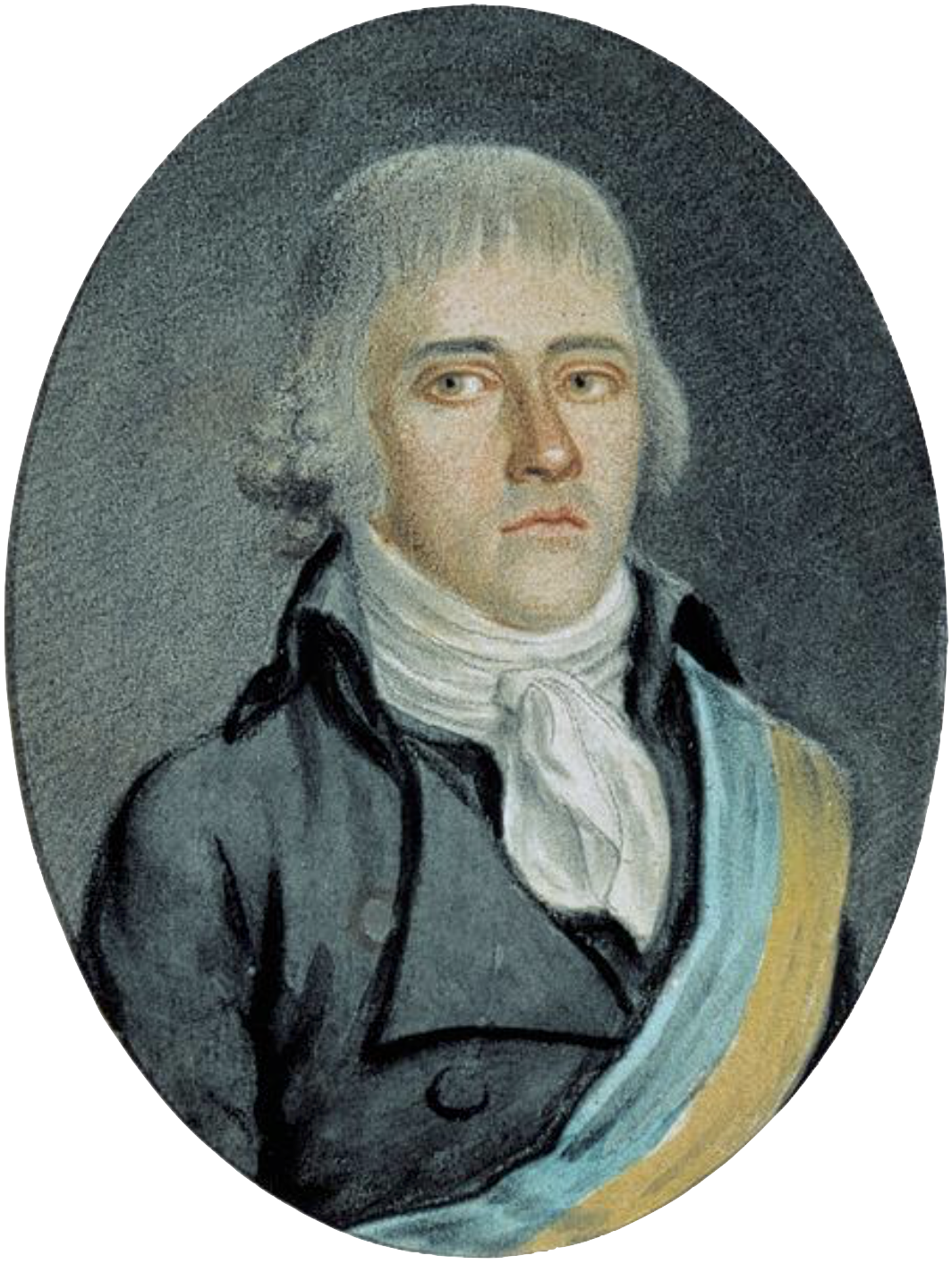
Pierre-Elie Bergier, politician of the Helvetic Republic, wearing the sash of the magistrates of the Canton of Léman, c. 1798

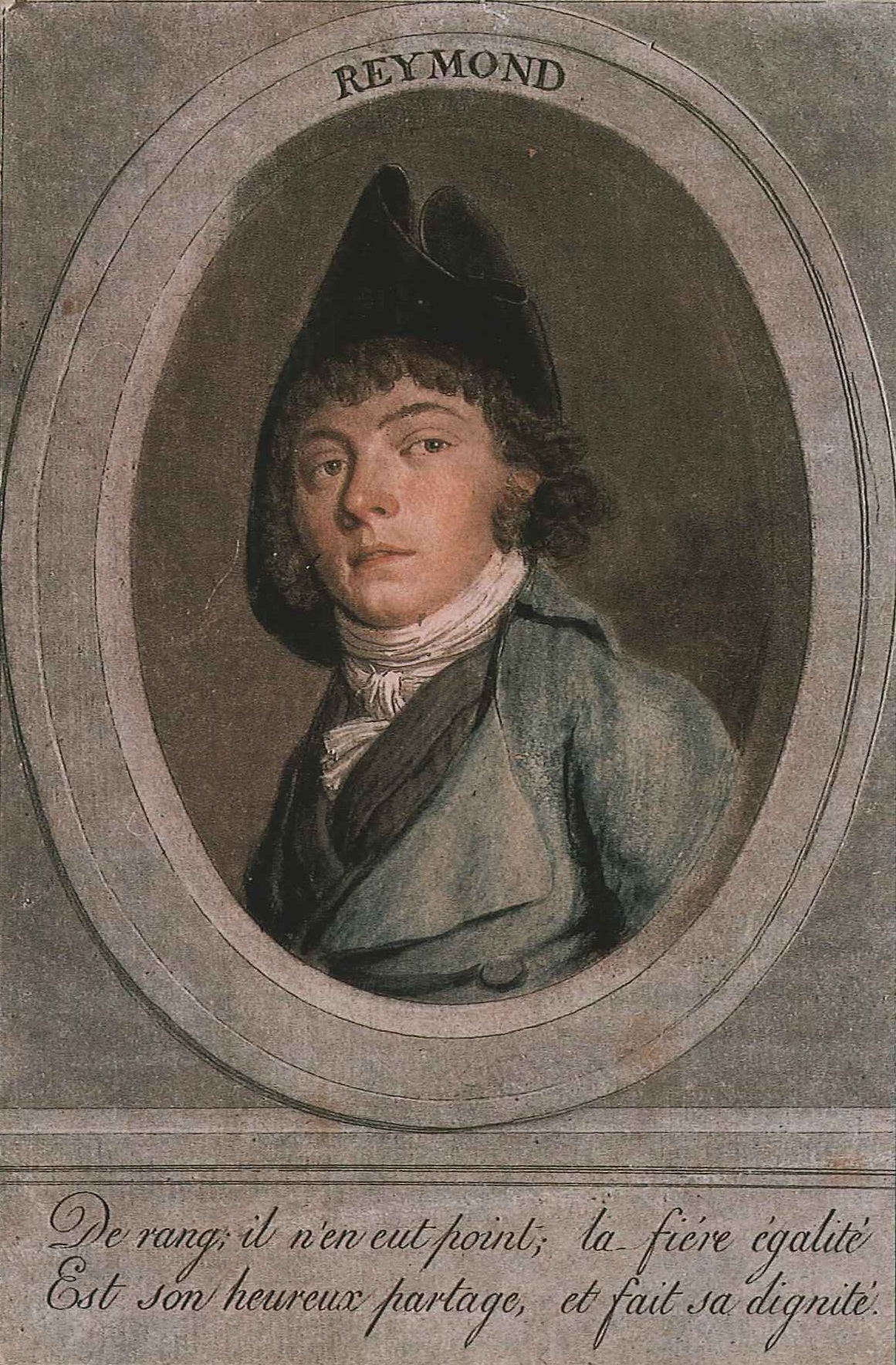
Louis Reymond, vaudois revolutionary and leader of the Bourla-papey, c. 1798
