= Peter Ochs =

Swiss politician

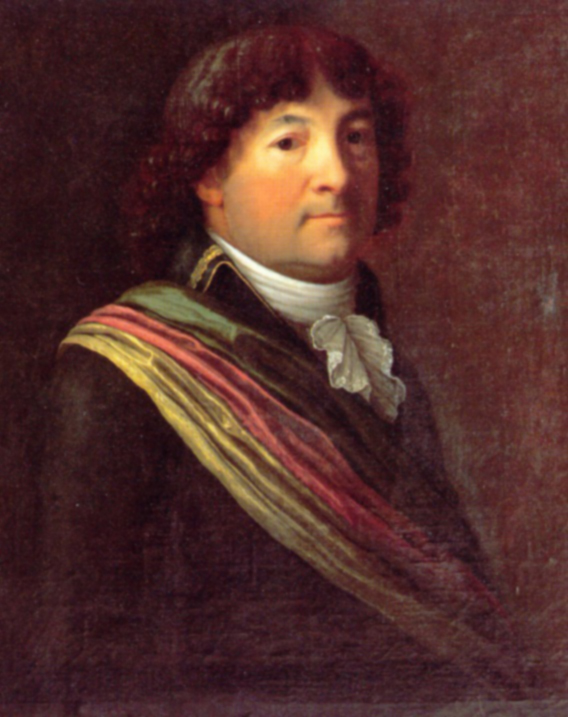
Peter Ochs wearing the official attire of a director of the Helvetic Republic, ca. 1798/99

Peter Ochs (20 August 1752, Nantes, France – 19 June 1821, Basel, Switzerland) was a Swiss politician who is best known for drawing up the first constitution of the short-lived Helvetic Republic.

== Biography ==
Born in France of a family that claimed roots in the Basel aristocracy, Ochs himself settled in Basel in 1769. In 1776 he obtained a doctorate of laws, became a magistrate and took up politics, making many useful contacts through his marriage.

At the time Switzerland was a confederacy of self-governing cantons held together by a loose military alliance. There was little in terms of actual union and no central government. Like most of Europe, Switzerland was deemed feudal in nature since the wealthiest members of society benefited from privileges that others were denied. There was much resentment over this which led to many conspiracies and uprisings, such as that led by Major Abraham Davel who protested at what he saw as the oppressive treatment that Bern meted out to his native Vaud which was then under Bern's control.

Upon the outbreak of the French Revolution of 1789, Ochs joined the partisans of revolutionary reform. With Frédéric-César de La Harpe, he called for the French to send troops into Switzerland, overthrow the "decayed Confederation" and establish a unified nation.

In 1798 the French did just that. Troops moved into Switzerland and, with little resistance, soon took over the whole country. Ochs himself drew up a new constitution, abolishing the Confederacy and establishing a new central government, inspired by the French model. The new regime included a two-chamber legislature in which Ochs served as first president of the Helvetic Senate and, later, as president of the state executive, the Directory.

He later fell out with de La Harpe and was forced out of government on 25 June 1799. The Helvetic Republic was abolished by the Act of Mediation in 1803 and Switzerland became a confederacy once again. In Basel Ochs achieved local prominence for his part in devising new governmental and penal codes and reorganizing the city university.

Peter-Ochs-Strasse in Basel is named for him.
