= Frédéric-César de La Harpe =

Swiss political leader (1754–1838)

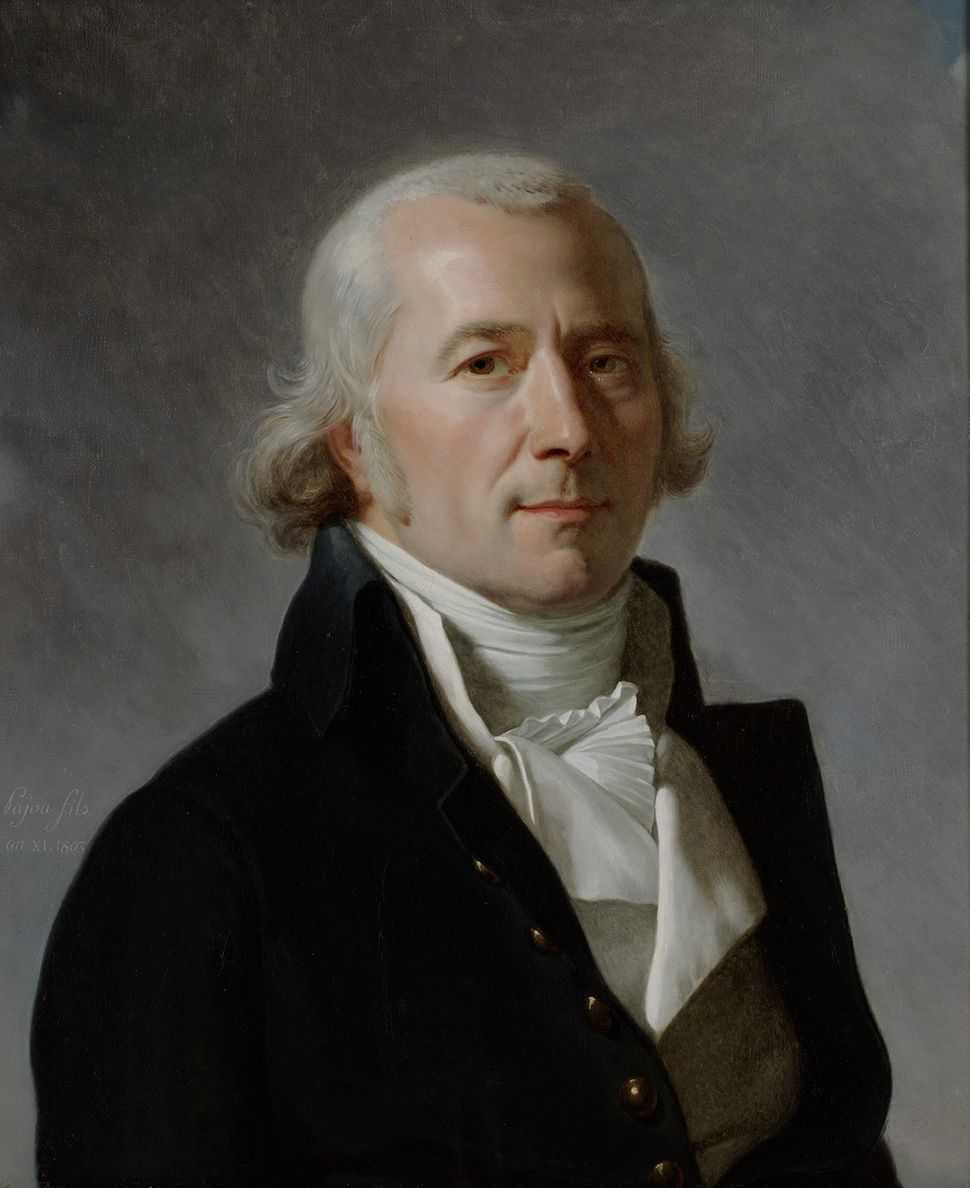
- Portrait by Pajou, November 1803
- Born: 6 April 1754; Rolle, Swiss Confederacy
- Died: 30 March 1838 (aged 83); Lausanne, Switzerland
- Education: University of Tübingen
- Occupations: Politician, writer, journalist
- Known for: Independence of Vaud; Founder and Director of Helvetic Republic; Tutor to Alexander I of Russia
- Notable work: Essay on the Constitution of the Vaud (1796–1797)
- Relatives: Amédée Emmanuel François Laharpe (cousin)

Frédéric-César de La Harpe (French pronunciation: [fʁedeʁik sezaʁ də la aʁp]; 6 April 1754 – 30 March 1838) was a Swiss political leader, writer and journalist, best known for his pivotal role in the independence of the canton of Vaud from Bern and in the formation of the Helvetic Republic, in which he served as a member of its Directory. He was a personal teacher of Alexander I of Russia and educated him in the ideas of the Lumières.

== Early life and education ==
La Harpe was born in 1754 in Rolle, Vaud, Switzerland, to Sigismond de la Harpe and Sophie Dorothée Crinsoz de Colombier. At the time Switzerland was a confederacy of mainly self-governing cantons held together by a loose military alliance, with little in terms of actual union and no central government. Some of the cantons were what was referred to as subject lands since they were governed by other cantons: Vaud, for example, had been under the control of Bern since the 16th century. La Harpe studied at the University of Tübingen in 1774, graduating with a doctorate of Laws degree. Leaving Switzerland, La Harpe travelled to Russia, where in 1783 he became a tutor for the two eldest heirs of Emperor Paul I, Konstantin and Alexander, the future emperor of Russia, with whom La Harpe remained in contact well into his reign.

La Harpe was a republican idealist, seeing the rule of the Bernese administration as oligarchical, and as an infringement on the natural rights of the people of Vaud and the other subject states, such as Fribourg. La Harpe viewed the rule of the culturally dissimilar Bernese government and aristocracy as uncaring for the popular will, and contrary to the historical sovereignty of Vaud, in the tradition of the Swiss people. Because of this, La Harpe attempted to achieve a return to the "Old Regime" of the Swiss, and to create a system wherein local governance was centralized in a representative structure, rather than the existing system of subject states within the region; this proposed system, he believed, would preserve the natural rights and freedom of citizens.

== Political career ==
During his time in Saint Petersburg, La Harpe began to plan an uprising of the people of Vaud against the rule of Bern. He had been denounced by the Bernese government already in 1791, for approving of revolutionary banquets being held in Vaud, one of which was organized by his cousin, Amédée de la Harpe. La Harpe returned to Switzerland in 1794, in the midst of the French Revolutionary period, to seek support for his planned uprising; with support gathered, La Harpe continued to Paris, seeking French support to fight the control of Bern, publishing documents such as the Essay on the Constitution of the Vaud. On 10 December 1797, he addressed the French Directory, stating that commitments made by the Duke of Savoy in treaties signed with Bern at Lausanne in 1564 were now the responsibility of the French and thus gave them the right to assist the people of Vaud against the Bernese.

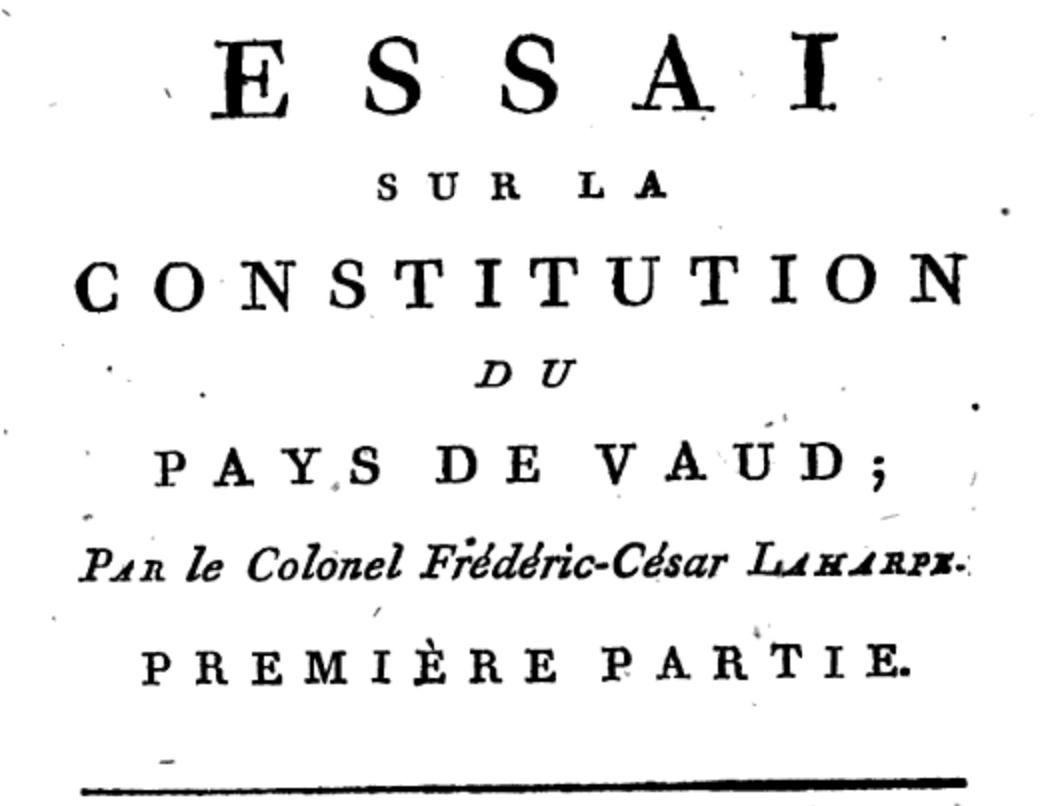
La Harpe's "Essai sur la Constitution du Pays de Vaud"

By the time the French sent troops into Vaud in late January 1798, local people had already risen up and driven away the Bernese baillis (or governor) and proclaimed the Lemanic Republic. This did not stop the French who proceeded to a largely peaceful invasion of Switzerland. With this French aid, a broader movement throughout Switzerland was begun by La Harpe and Peter Ochs, which culminated in the eventual formation of a centralized republic, called the Helvetic Republic. The republic was ruled by a central Directory, of which La Harpe became a member on 29 June 1798, as well as a Senate and some local governance.

However, this state did not last; the abolition of the traditional cantons, as well as the overall structure of the Republic was unpopular with many of the Swiss people; additionally, the French pillaging of state coffers, the curbing of the right to worship and the heavy-handed crushing of resistance, most notably in Nidwalden, caused considerable resentment among the Swiss people. Invasions by Austrian and Russian troops opposing the spread of the French revolutionary sentiment lead to further dissatisfaction. More trouble stirred internally with the Republican government, as La Harpe deposed the leader of the Directory, and the Helvetic Republic's co-founder, Peter Ochs in 1799. La Harpe himself eventually became a victim of the instability and violence that had surrounded Switzerland in the late eighteenth century. He was overthrown by a coup, and was forced to flee in 1800.

== Post-republic career ==
A map of the Helvetic Republic, of which La Harpe was a founder and leader, specifically in the Canton of Léman.

From his removal from power in 1800 until 1814, La Harpe lived near Paris, dedicating himself to writing. Between August 1801 and May 1802, he stayed in Saint Petersburg, where he often met with his former pupil, Alexander, who had been crowned Tsar of the Russian Empire in the meantime. In 1803, as First Consul of France, Bonaparte drafted the Act of Mediation which abolished the Helvetic Republic and turned Switzerland back into a confederacy, but guaranteed the independence of the former subject territories (such as Vaud) that now joined the confederation as cantons. La Harpe continued to support their independence within the Swiss confederation. The restored Confederacy initially suppressed La Harpe's modernist reforms, however, owing to the large scale support garnered by the Swiss Republicans, granted them the liberty to express their beliefs. La Harpe himself refused to take part in the negotiations, in fact he wrote to Emperor Alexander complaining that "So much trouble has gone into doing such detestable work, whereas a week would have been enough to supplement all that was required for a single, central government".

At the collapse of Napoleon's empire, in 1813, La Harpe and his friend Henri Monod petitioned Emperor Alexander, who in turn persuaded the other Allied powers, to recognise Vaudois and Argovian independence, in spite of Bern's attempts to reclaim them as subject lands. At the Congress of Vienna, where the major powers set about redrawing the map of Europe following Napoleon's defeat, La Harpe acted as a representative of several Swiss cantons. He gained further recognition for Vaud's rights, though he opposed the Federal Treaty of 1815 which established Switzerland's post-Napoleonic arrangements. He returned to Switzerland in 1816 and settled in Lausanne. In his later political career, La Harpe continued to defend religious liberty and individual rights, and between 1817 and 1826 he was a liberal member of the Grand Council of Vaud. He died in Lausanne on 30 March 1838, aged 83.

== Legacy ==
Although the Helvetic Republic was itself short-lived, many fragments of the republic live on in modern Swiss society. While the involvement of French troops in the republic, and the internal conflict involved are largely criticized, the structure of the government mirrors fairly closely the current Swiss government; in particular, the Swiss Directory, a committee of a few members, as the head of state is an idea which was adopted in the Swiss Federal Constitution, and lives on in the current Federal Council.

== Impact on the revolutionary period ==
La Harpe, in addition to supporting the independence of subject states in Switzerland, also played a large part in shaping the French Revolutionary period. Republican government, having only recently taken root in France, was a very new part of the European political sphere, and the creation of the Helvetic Republic marked a continued spread of republican ideas in practice. While short lived, the work of La Harpe contrasted the situations in the German states, and of the Habsburg Austria at the time. While this republic was met with poor response by the Swiss people, the ideas and structure of its government contributed to the shaping of the political conditions and respective governments of the nation-states of the 1800s, especially in Germany and Italy.

== Bibliography ==
- (in French) Sonia Arnal, "Frédéric-César Laharpe « fossoyeur » puis sauveur des Suisses", Allez savoir !, no. 28, February 2004.
- Zartoryski, Prince Adam. Memoirs of Prince Adam Czartoryski and His Correspondence with Alexander I.: With Documents Relative to the Prince's Negotiations with Pitt, Fox, and Brougham, and an Account of His Conversations with Lord Palmerston and Other English Statesmen in London in 1832. Ed. Adam Gielgud. London: Remington, 1888. Google Books. 20 Aug. 2014. Web. 05 Dec. 2015. here.
- De La Harpe, Frédéric-César. Essai Sur LaConstitution Du Pays De Vaud. Paris: Batilliot, 1796. Google Books. 19 Apr. 2010. Web. 25 Nov. 2015. here.
- De La Harpe, Frédéric-César. Biographie De Mr Frédéric César Laharpe, Ci-devant Directeur De La République Helvétique: Suivie D'extraits De Ses Ouvrages Politiques. N.p.: n.p., 1818. Google Books. University of Lausanne, 8 Jan. 2009. Web. 25 Nov. 2015. here .
- De La Harpe, Frédéric-César. Biographie De Mr Frédéric César Laharpe, Ci-devant Directeur De La République Helvétique: Suivie D'extraits De Ses Ouvrages Politiques. N.p.: n.p., 1818. Google Books. University of Lausanne, 8 Jan. 2009. Web. 25 Nov. 2015. here .
- Lerner, Marc H. A Laboratory of Liberty: The Transformation of Political Culture in Republican Switzerland. Leiden: Koninklijke Brill NV, 2011. Google Books. Web. 08 Dec. 2015. here.
