= Penthaz =

- Municipality
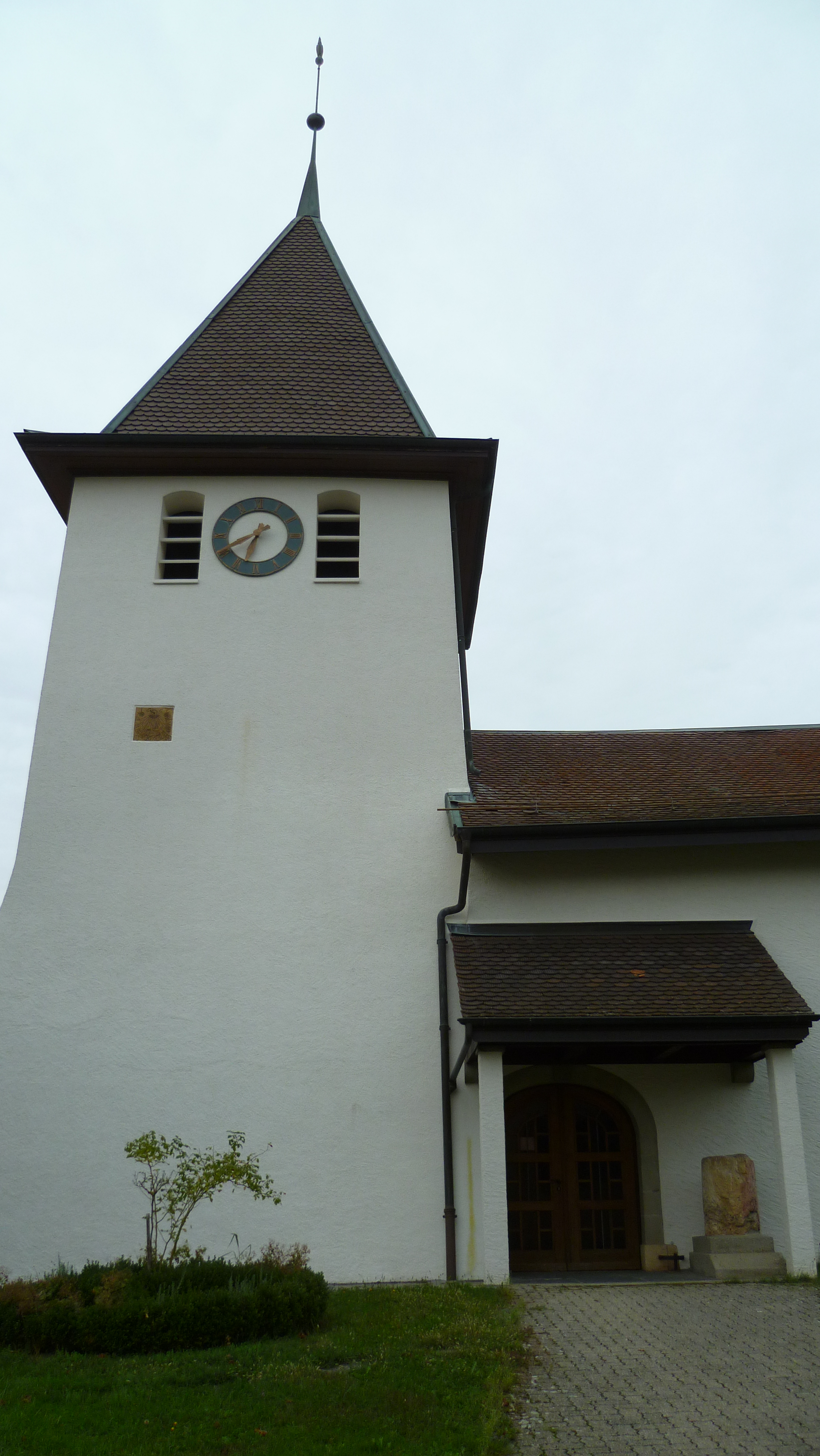

- Flag Coat of arms
- Location of Penthaz
- Location within Switzerland Location within Canton of Vaud
- Coordinates: 46°36′N 06°32′E
- Country: Switzerland
- Canton: Vaud
- District: Gros-de-Vaud

Government
  - Mayor: Syndic

Area
  - Total: 3.83 km^{2} (1.48 sq mi)
- Elevation: 482 m (1,581 ft)

Population (2003)
  - Total: 1,359
  - Density: 355/km^{2} (919/sq mi)
- Time zone: UTC+01:00 (CET)
  - Summer (DST): UTC+02:00 (CEST)
- Postal code: 1303
- SFOS number: 5496
- ISO 3166 code: CH-VD
- Surrounded by: Bournens, Daillens, Gollion, Penthalaz, Sullens, Vufflens-la-Ville
- Website: www.penthaz.ch

Penthaz is a municipality in the district of Gros-de-Vaud in the canton of Vaud in Switzerland.

== History ==
Penthaz is first mentioned in 1011 as Penta.

== Geography ==
Penthaz has an area, as of 2009, of 3.83 square kilometers (1.48 sq mi). Of this area, 2.57 km^{2} (0.99 sq mi) or 67.1% is used for agricultural purposes, while 0.52 km^{2} (0.20 sq mi) or 13.6% is forested. Of the rest of the land, 0.67 km^{2} (0.26 sq mi) or 17.5% is settled (buildings or roads), 0.03 km^{2} (7.4 acres) or 0.8% is either rivers or lakes and 0.07 km^{2} (17 acres) or 1.8% is unproductive land.

Of the built up area, industrial buildings made up 1.6% of the total area while housing and buildings made up 8.9% and transportation infrastructure made up 5.5%. Power and water infrastructure as well as other special developed areas made up 1.3% of the area Out of the forested land, 12.0% of the total land area is heavily forested and 1.6% is covered with orchards or small clusters of trees. Of the agricultural land, 61.1% is used for growing crops and 5.7% is pastures. Of the water in the municipality, 0.5% is in lakes and 0.3% is in rivers and streams.

The municipality was part of the Cossonay District until it was dissolved on 31 August 2006, and Penthaz became part of the new district of Gros-de-Vaud.

The municipality is located on the left bank of the Venoge river.

== Coat of arms ==
The blazon of the municipal coat of arms is Azure, a Bend wavy Argent, overall a Column Or.

== Demographics ==
Penthaz has a population (as of December 2020) of 1,855. As of 2008, 17.8% of the population are resident foreign nationals. Over the last 10 years (1999–2009 ) the population has changed at a rate of 13.8%. It has changed at a rate of 8% due to migration and at a rate of 5.7% due to births and deaths.

Most of the population (as of 2000) speaks French (1,150 or 89.4%), with German being second most common (49 or 3.8%) and Italian being third (32 or 2.5%).

Of the population in the municipality 243 or about 18.9% were born in Penthaz and lived there in 2000. There were 581 or 45.1% who were born in the same canton, while 209 or 16.2% were born somewhere else in Switzerland, and 247 or 19.2% were born outside of Switzerland.

In 2008 there were 8 live births to Swiss citizens and 2 births to non-Swiss citizens, and in same time span there were 3 deaths of Swiss citizens and 1 non-Swiss citizen death. Ignoring immigration and emigration, the population of Swiss citizens increased by 5 while the foreign population increased by 1. There were 8 Swiss men and 12 Swiss women who immigrated back to Switzerland. At the same time, there were 6 non-Swiss men and 7 non-Swiss women who immigrated from another country to Switzerland. The total Swiss population change in 2008 (from all sources, including moves across municipal borders) was an increase of 55 and the non-Swiss population increased by 22 people. This represents a population growth rate of 5.6%.

The age distribution, as of 2009, in Penthaz is; 172 children or 11.6% of the population are between 0 and 9 years old and 189 teenagers or 12.8% are between 10 and 19. Of the adult population, 168 people or 11.4% of the population are between 20 and 29 years old. 241 people or 16.3% are between 30 and 39, 239 people or 16.1% are between 40 and 49, and 191 people or 12.9% are between 50 and 59. The senior population distribution is 179 people or 12.1% of the population are between 60 and 69 years old, 65 people or 4.4% are between 70 and 79, there are 30 people or 2.0% who are between 80 and 89, and there are 6 people or 0.4% who are 90 and older.

As of 2000, there were 516 people who were single and never married in the municipality. There were 650 married individuals, 47 widows or widowers and 74 individuals who are divorced.

As of 2000, there were 542 private households in the municipality, and an average of 2.3 persons per household. There were 156 households that consist of only one person and 19 households with five or more people. Out of a total of 549 households that answered this question, 28.4% were households made up of just one person. Of the rest of the households, there are 166 married couples without children, 186 married couples with children There were 25 single parents with a child or children. There were 9 households that were made up of unrelated people and 7 households that were made up of some sort of institution or another collective housing.

In 2000 there were 210 single family homes (or 72.9% of the total) out of a total of 288 inhabited buildings. There were 57 multi-family buildings (19.8%), along with 14 multi-purpose buildings that were mostly used for housing (4.9%) and 7 other use buildings (commercial or industrial) that also had some housing (2.4%). Of the single family homes 24 were built before 1919, while 21 were built between 1990 and 2000. The greatest number of single family homes (66) were built between 1971 and 1980. The most multi-family homes (13) were built between 1971 and 1980 and the next most (12) were built between 1961 and 1970. There were 3 multi-family houses built between 1996 and 2000.

In 2000 there were 535 apartments in the municipality. The most common apartment size was 3 rooms of which there were 175. There were 13 single room apartments and 151 apartments with five or more rooms. Of these apartments, a total of 506 apartments (94.6% of the total) were permanently occupied, while 25 apartments (4.7%) were seasonally occupied and 4 apartments (0.7%) were empty. As of 2009, the construction rate of new housing units was 33.6 new units per 1000 residents. The vacancy rate for the municipality, in 2010, was 0.79%.

The historical population is given in the following chart:

== Heritage sites of national significance ==
The Centre d'archivage of the Swiss Film Archive is listed as a Swiss heritage site of national significance.

== Politics ==
In the 2007 federal election the most popular party was the SVP which received 25.45% of the vote. The next three most popular parties were the SP (22.91%), the Green Party (13.93%) and the FDP (11.43%). In the federal election, a total of 352 votes were cast, and the voter turnout was 39.7%.

== Economy ==
As of 2010, Penthaz had an unemployment rate of 4.5%. As of 2008, there were 13 people employed in the primary economic sector and about 6 businesses involved in this sector. 159 people were employed in the secondary sector and there were 22 businesses in this sector. 155 people were employed in the tertiary sector, with 29 businesses in this sector. There were 726 residents of the municipality who were employed in some capacity, of which females made up 42.4% of the workforce.

In 2008 the total number of full-time equivalent jobs was 283. The number of jobs in the primary sector was 10, all of which were in agriculture. The number of jobs in the secondary sector was 147 of which 25 or (17.0%) were in manufacturing and 106 (72.1%) were in construction. The number of jobs in the tertiary sector was 126. In the tertiary sector; 44 or 34.9% were in wholesale or retail sales or the repair of motor vehicles, 2 or 1.6% were in the movement and storage of goods, 5 or 4.0% were in a hotel or restaurant, 3 or 2.4% were in the information industry, 28 or 22.2% were technical professionals or scientists, 12 or 9.5% were in education and 10 or 7.9% were in health care.

In 2000, there were 183 workers who commuted into the municipality and 590 workers who commuted away. The municipality is a net exporter of workers, with about 3.2 workers leaving the municipality for every one entering. Of the working population, 11.8% used public transportation to get to work, and 72.2% used a private car.

== Religion ==
From the 2000 census, 406 or 31.5% were Roman Catholic, while 634 or 49.3% belonged to the Swiss Reformed Church. Of the rest of the population, there were 11 members of an Orthodox church (or about 0.85% of the population), there were 7 individuals (or about 0.54% of the population) who belonged to the Christian Catholic Church, and there were 59 individuals (or about 4.58% of the population) who belonged to another Christian church. There was 1 individual who was Jewish, and 8 (or about 0.62% of the population) who were Islamic. There were 1 individual who belonged to another church. 164 (or about 12.74% of the population) belonged to no church, are agnostic or atheist, and 25 individuals (or about 1.94% of the population) did not answer the question.

== Education ==
In Penthaz about 592 or (46.0%) of the population have completed non-mandatory upper secondary education, and 158 or (12.3%) have completed additional higher education (either university or a Fachhochschule). Of the 158 who completed tertiary schooling, 57.6% were Swiss men, 24.1% were Swiss women, 12.0% were non-Swiss men and 6.3% were non-Swiss women.

In the 2009/2010 school year there were a total of 210 students in the Penthaz school district. In the Vaud cantonal school system, two years of non-obligatory pre-school are provided by the political districts. During the school year, the political district provided pre-school care for a total of 296 children of which 96 children (32.4%) received subsidized pre-school care. The canton's primary school program requires students to attend for four years. There were 98 students in the municipal primary school program. The obligatory lower secondary school program lasts for six years and there were 112 students in those schools.

As of 2000, there were 80 students in Penthaz who came from another municipality, while 122 residents attended schools outside the municipality.

Penthaz is home to the Swiss Film Archive library. The library has (as of 2008) 3,338,183 books or other media. It was open a total of 240 days with average of 30 hours per week during that year.

== See also ==
- Penthalaz
