= Penthalaz =

- Municipality
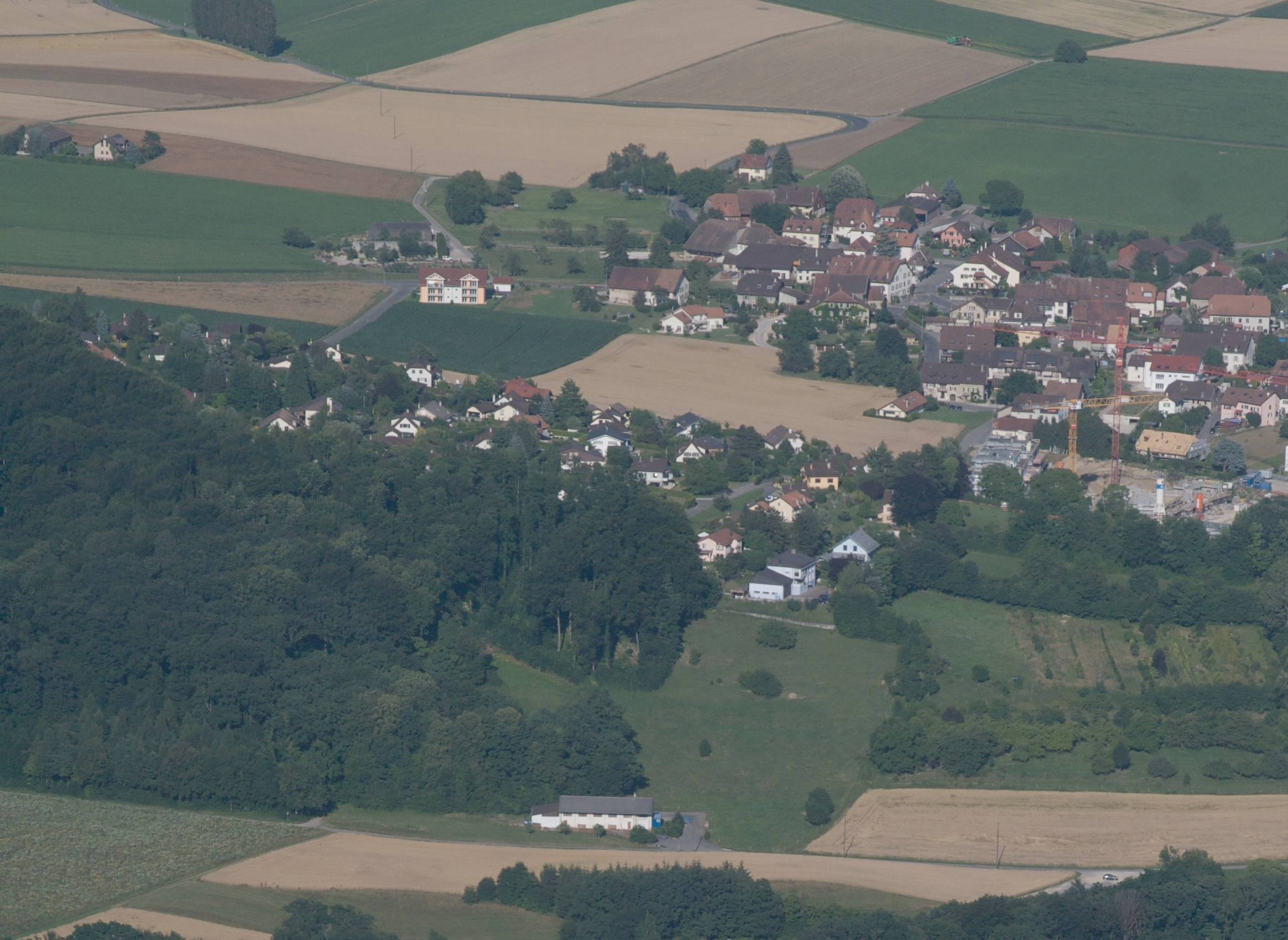
- Aerial view of Penthalaz village

- Flag Coat of arms
- Location of Penthalaz
- Location within Switzerland Location within Canton of Vaud
- Coordinates: 46°37′N 06°32′E
- Country: Switzerland
- Canton: Vaud
- District: Gros-de-Vaud

Government
  - Mayor: Syndic

Area
  - Total: 3.87 km^{2} (1.49 sq mi)
- Elevation: 491 m (1,611 ft)

Population (2003)
  - Total: 2,250
  - Density: 581/km^{2} (1,510/sq mi)
- Time zone: UTC+01:00 (CET)
  - Summer (DST): UTC+02:00 (CEST)
- Postal code: 1305
- SFOS number: 5495
- ISO 3166 code: CH-VD
- Surrounded by: Cossonay, Daillens, Gollion, Lussery-Villars, Penthaz
- Website: penthalaz.ch

Penthalaz is a municipality in the district of Gros-de-Vaud in the canton of Vaud in Switzerland.

== History ==
Penthalaz is first mentioned in 1182 as Pentala.

== Geography ==
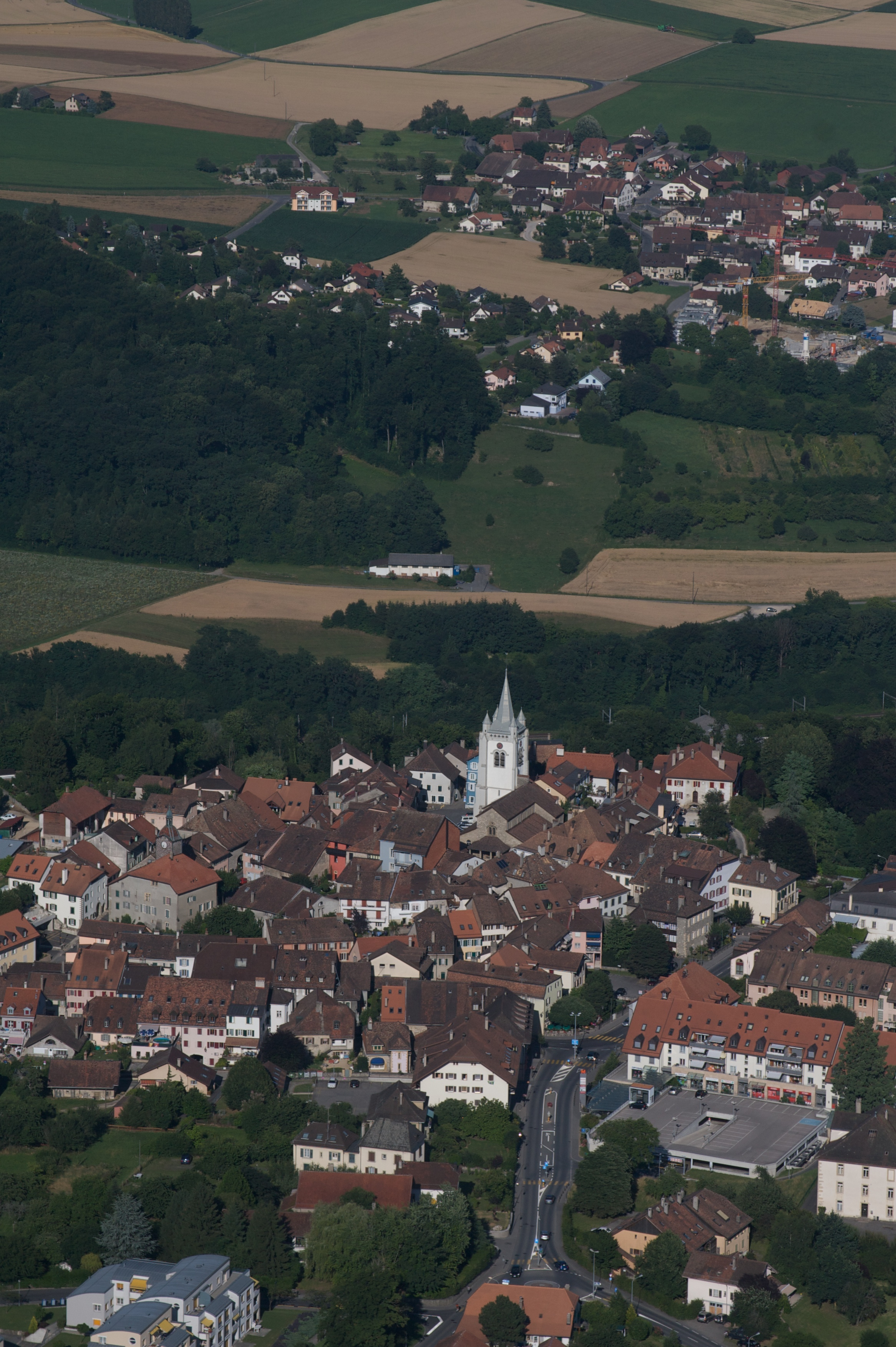
Aerial view of Cossonay with Penthalaz in the background

Penthalaz has an area, as of 2009, of 3.87 square kilometers (1.49 sq mi). Of this area, 2.16 km^{2} (0.83 sq mi) or 55.8% is used for agricultural purposes, while 0.65 km^{2} (0.25 sq mi) or 16.8% is forested. Of the rest of the land, 0.98 km^{2} (0.38 sq mi) or 25.3% is settled (buildings or roads), 0.06 km^{2} (15 acres) or 1.6% is either rivers or lakes.

Of the built up area, industrial buildings made up 3.4% of the total area while housing and buildings made up 12.7% and transportation infrastructure made up 7.0%. while parks, green belts and sports fields made up 2.3%. Out of the forested land, 15.2% of the total land area is heavily forested and 1.6% is covered with orchards or small clusters of trees. Of the agricultural land, 47.0% is used for growing crops and 7.2% is pastures, while 1.6% is used for orchards or vine crops. All the water in the municipality is flowing water.

The municipality was part of the Cossonay District until it was dissolved on 31 August 2006, and Penthalaz became part of the new district of Gros-de-Vaud.

The municipality is located along the left bank of the Venoge river. It consists of the village of Penthalaz, the working-class neighborhood Sous la Ville, the residential neighborhood Bellevue and the industrial zone Cossonay-Gare.

== Coat of arms ==
The blazon of the municipal coat of arms is Per pale Azure and Or, overall a Bend wavy Argent, two Mining-wheels counterchanged.

== Demographics ==
Penthalaz has a population (as of December 2020) of 3,207. As of 2008, 20.9% of the population are resident foreign nationals. Over the last 10 years (1999–2009 ) the population has changed at a rate of 25.7%. It has changed at a rate of 27.4% due to migration and at a rate of -1.1% due to births and deaths.

Most of the population (as of 2000) speaks French (2,000 or 87.6%), with German being second most common (64 or 2.8%) and Portuguese being third (53 or 2.3%). There are 47 people who speak Italian.

Of the population in the municipality 465 or about 20.4% were born in Penthalaz and lived there in 2000. There were 993 or 43.5% who were born in the same canton, while 319 or 14.0% were born somewhere else in Switzerland, and 445 or 19.5% were born outside of Switzerland.

In 2008 there were 22 live births to Swiss citizens and 8 births to non-Swiss citizens, and in same time span there were 17 deaths of Swiss citizens and 2 non-Swiss citizen deaths. Ignoring immigration and emigration, the population of Swiss citizens increased by 5 while the foreign population increased by 6. There was 1 Swiss man and 1 Swiss woman who immigrated back to Switzerland. At the same time, there were 26 non-Swiss men and 25 non-Swiss women who immigrated from another country to Switzerland. The total Swiss population change in 2008 (from all sources, including moves across municipal borders) was an increase of 66 and the non-Swiss population increased by 89 people. This represents a population growth rate of 6.4%.

The age distribution, as of 2009, in Penthalaz is; 285 children or 10.0% of the population are between 0 and 9 years old and 312 teenagers or 10.9% are between 10 and 19. Of the adult population, 415 people or 14.5% of the population are between 20 and 29 years old. 488 people or 17.1% are between 30 and 39, 460 people or 16.1% are between 40 and 49, and 340 people or 11.9% are between 50 and 59. The senior population distribution is 269 people or 9.4% of the population are between 60 and 69 years old, 171 people or 6.0% are between 70 and 79, there are 94 people or 3.3% who are between 80 and 89, and there are 24 people or 0.8% who are 90 and older.

As of 2000, there were 853 people who were single and never married in the municipality. There were 1,160 married individuals, 155 widows or widowers and 115 individuals who are divorced.

As of 2000, there were 979 private households in the municipality, and an average of 2.3 persons per household. There were 314 households that consist of only one person and 42 households with five or more people. Out of a total of 994 households that answered this question, 31.6% were households made up of just one person and there were 3 adults who lived with their parents. Of the rest of the households, there are 292 married couples without children, 314 married couples with children There were 43 single parents with a child or children. There were 13 households that were made up of unrelated people and 15 households that were made up of some sort of institution or another collective housing.

In 2000 there were 212 single family homes (or 52.9% of the total) out of a total of 401 inhabited buildings. There were 129 multi-family buildings (32.2%), along with 41 multi-purpose buildings that were mostly used for housing (10.2%) and 19 other use buildings (commercial or industrial) that also had some housing (4.7%). Of the single family homes 13 were built before 1919, while 32 were built between 1990 and 2000. The greatest number of single family homes (47) were built between 1946 and 1960. The most multi-family homes (33) were built between 1946 and 1960 and the next most (32) were built before 1919. There were 2 multi-family houses built between 1996 and 2000.

In 2000 there were 1,035 apartments in the municipality. The most common apartment size was 3 rooms of which there were 419. There were 34 single room apartments and 196 apartments with five or more rooms. Of these apartments, a total of 969 apartments (93.6% of the total) were permanently occupied, while 51 apartments (4.9%) were seasonally occupied and 15 apartments (1.4%) were empty. As of 2009, the construction rate of new housing units was 35.6 new units per 1000 residents. The vacancy rate for the municipality, in 2010, was 0.67%.

The historical population is given in the following chart:

== Politics ==
In the 2007 federal election the most popular party was the SP which received 28.91% of the vote. The next three most popular parties were the SVP (22.11%), the FDP (15.42%) and the Green Party (11.46%). In the federal election, a total of 626 votes were cast, and the voter turnout was 40.3%.

== Economy ==
As of 2010, Penthalaz had an unemployment rate of 6.3%. As of 2008, there were 16 people employed in the primary economic sector and about 7 businesses involved in this sector. 547 people were employed in the secondary sector and there were 29 businesses in this sector. 457 people were employed in the tertiary sector, with 64 businesses in this sector. There were 1,169 residents of the municipality who were employed in some capacity, of which females made up 44.1% of the workforce.

In 2008 the total number of full-time equivalent jobs was 887. The number of jobs in the primary sector was 8, all of which were in agriculture. The number of jobs in the secondary sector was 520 of which 486 or (93.5%) were in manufacturing and 35 (6.7%) were in construction. The number of jobs in the tertiary sector was 359. In the tertiary sector; 112 or 31.2% were in wholesale or retail sales or the repair of motor vehicles, 9 or 2.5% were in the movement and storage of goods, 27 or 7.5% were in a hotel or restaurant, 26 or 7.2% were in the information industry, 4 or 1.1% were the insurance or financial industry, 33 or 9.2% were technical professionals or scientists, 17 or 4.7% were in education and 46 or 12.8% were in health care.

In 2000, there were 554 workers who commuted into the municipality and 885 workers who commuted away. The municipality is a net exporter of workers, with about 1.6 workers leaving the municipality for every one entering. About 1.6% of the workforce coming into Penthalaz are coming from outside Switzerland. Of the working population, 15.6% used public transportation to get to work, and 66.9% used a private car.

== Religion ==
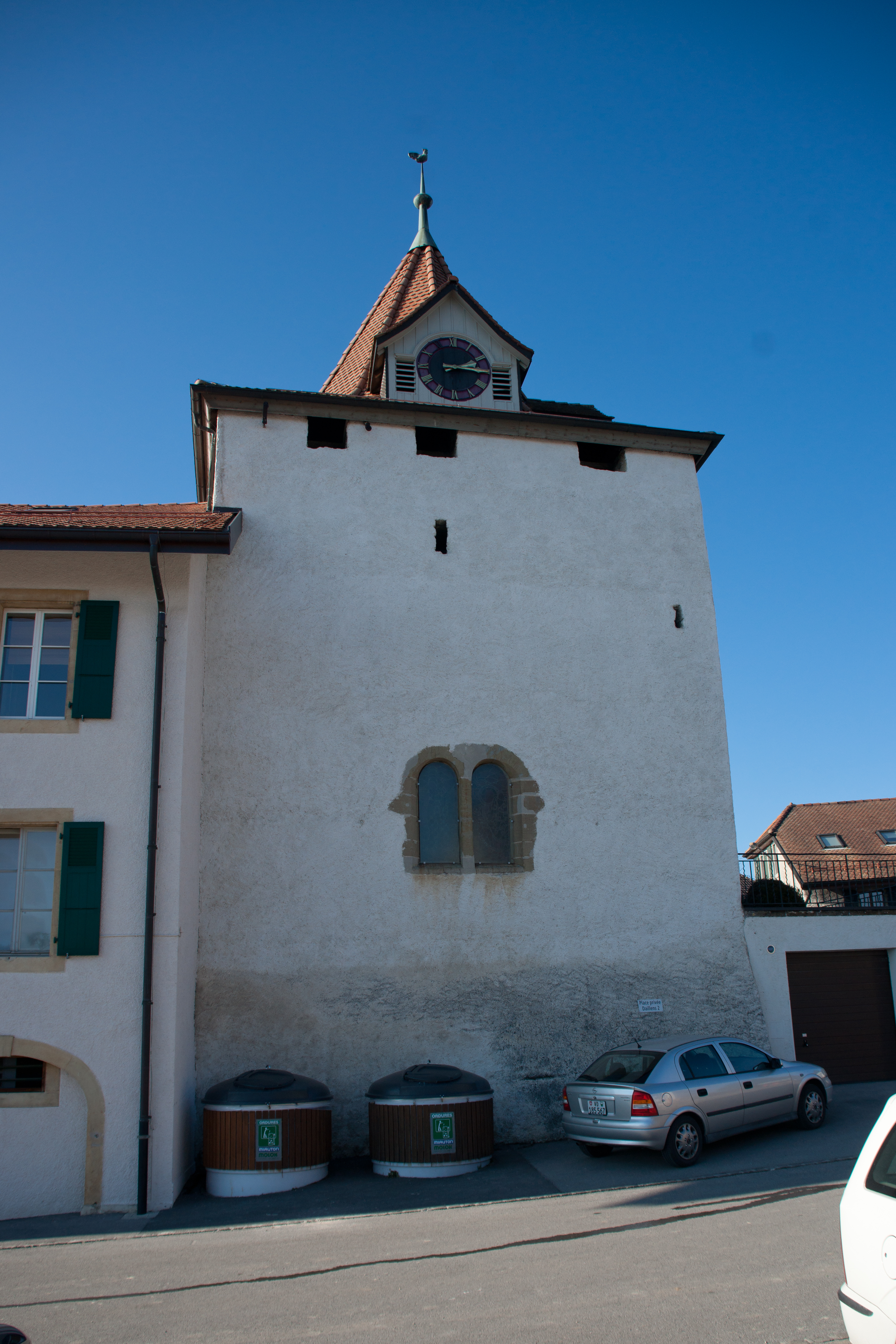
Tower of the village church

From the 2000 census, 590 or 25.8% were Roman Catholic, while 1,181 or 51.7% belonged to the Swiss Reformed Church. Of the rest of the population, there were 46 members of an Orthodox church (or about 2.01% of the population), and there were 97 individuals (or about 4.25% of the population) who belonged to another Christian church. There were58 (or about 2.54% of the population) who were Islamic. There were 2 individuals who were Buddhist and 8 individuals who belonged to another church. 256 (or about 11.21% of the population) belonged to no church, are agnostic or atheist, and 87 individuals (or about 3.81% of the population) did not answer the question.

== Education ==
In Penthalaz about 915 or (40.1%) of the population have completed non-mandatory upper secondary education, and 233 or (10.2%) have completed additional higher education (either university or a Fachhochschule). Of the 233 who completed tertiary schooling, 56.2% were Swiss men, 27.0% were Swiss women, 12.0% were non-Swiss men and 4.7% were non-Swiss women.

In the 2009/2010 school year there were a total of 312 students in the Penthalaz school district. In the Vaud cantonal school system, two years of non-obligatory pre-school are provided by the political districts. During the school year, the political district provided pre-school care for a total of 296 children of which 96 children (32.4%) received subsidized pre-school care. The canton's primary school program requires students to attend for four years. There were 156 students in the municipal primary school program. The obligatory lower secondary school program lasts for six years and there were 156 students in those schools.

As of 2000, there were 336 students in Penthalaz who came from another municipality, while 166 residents attended schools outside the municipality.

== Transportation ==
The municipality has a railway station, Cossonay-Penthalaz, on the Jura Foot and Simplon lines. It has regular service to Vallorbe, Lausanne, Aigle, and Grandson. In front of the railway station, there is a funicular station connecting the town of Cossonay. The lower funicular station is called Cossonay-Gare, but is in the village of Penthalaz.

== See also ==
- Penthaz
