= Cossonay =

- Municipality
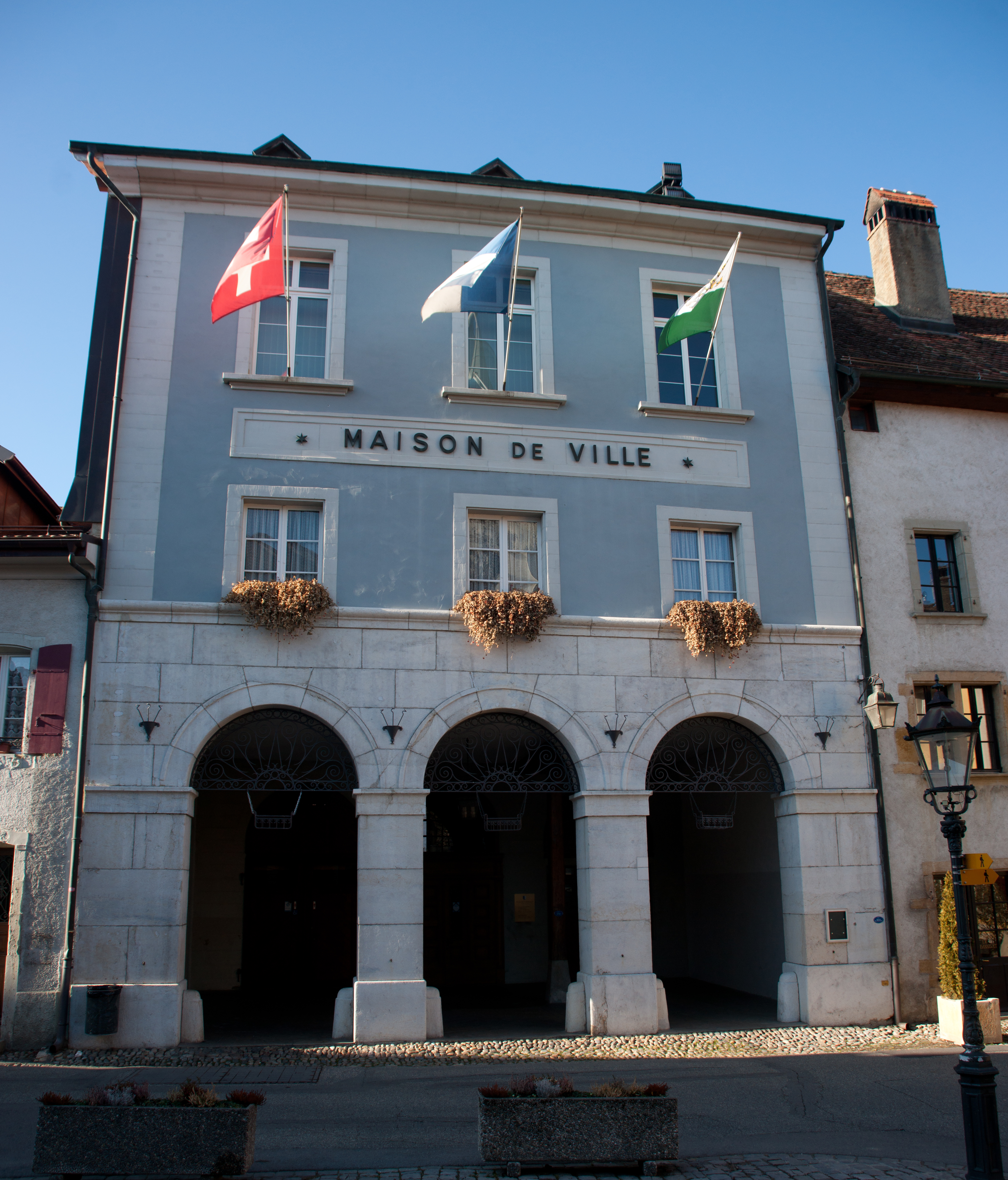
- Cossonay town hall

- Flag Coat of arms
- Location of Cossonay
- Location within Switzerland Location within Canton of Vaud
- Coordinates: 46°37′N 06°31′E
- Country: Switzerland
- Canton: Vaud
- District: Morges

Government
  - Mayor: Syndic; Georges Rime

Area
  - Total: 8.29 km^{2} (3.20 sq mi)
- Elevation: 562 m (1,844 ft)

Population (2003)
  - Total: 2,696
  - Density: 325/km^{2} (842/sq mi)
- Time zone: UTC+01:00 (CET)
  - Summer (DST): UTC+02:00 (CEST)
- Postal code: 1304
- SFOS number: 5477
- ISO 3166 code: CH-VD
- Localities: Allens
- Surrounded by: Penthalaz, Gollion, Senarclens, La Chaux, Dizy, Lussery-Villars
- Website: www.cossonay.ch

Cossonay is a municipality in the canton of Vaud in Switzerland. It is part of the district of Morges.

== History ==
Cossonay has both Roman ruins and medieval graves. The first documentation of the settlement dates from 1096 under the name Cochoniacum. In 1164, this appears as Cosonai, and in 1228 as Cossonai.

Ulrich von Cossonay gave the village church to the monastery in Romainmôtier in 1096. In 1224, it passed to the Benedictine monastery in Lutry, which built a priory in the second half of the 13th century. The town wall, built in the 11th century, was rebuilt and extended in the 13th and 14th centuries. The Barons of Cossonay ruled over a territory from La Chaux to Boussens and from Dizy to Gollion.

Cossonay received city rights in 1264. A fire near the end of the 14th century destroyed much of the town and the town archives. In 1421, the town passed to the house of Savoy.

When the canton of Vaud was conquered by the Bernese in 1536, the town came under the administration at Morges. From 1798 to 1803, Cossonay was part of the canton of Léman in the Helvetic Republic, which was transformed into the canton of Vaud by the mediation of Napoleon. The district of Cossonay was formed in 1798, and the municipality was its capital from its inception to its dissolution.

== Geography ==
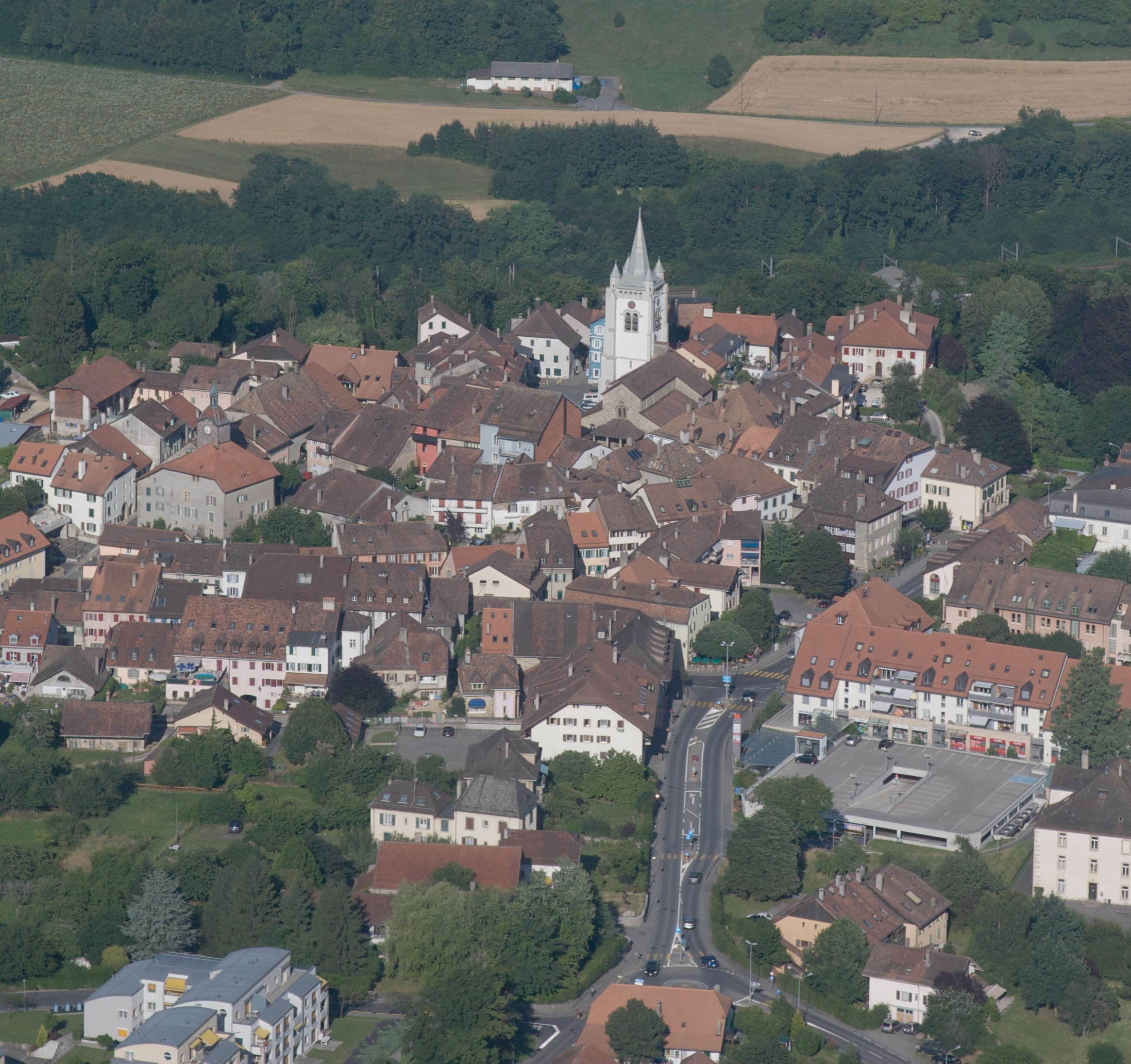
Aerial view of Cossonay

Aerial view (1949)

Cossonay lies at an elevation of 562 m (1,844 ft) and 14 km (8.7 mi) northwest of Lausanne. The town stretches across the high plateau west of the Venoge, about 130 m (430 ft) above the valley floor, in the Gros de Vaud in the middle of the canton of Vaud.

The municipality is the breadbasket of Vaud. The eastern boundary is the Venoge. In the south, it reaches down to the valley of the Valezard, and in the north to Pré Defour. On the west, lies the forest of Sépey, in which the highest point of the municipality lies at an elevation of 620 m. Here lies the Étang du Sépey, which is a lake formed by an earlier quarry.

Cossonay has an area, as of 2009, of 8.29 square kilometers (3.20 sq mi). Of this area, 5.15 km^{2} (1.99 sq mi) or 62.1% is used for agricultural purposes, while 1.91 km^{2} (0.74 sq mi) or 23.0% is forested. Of the rest of the land, 1.16 km^{2} (0.45 sq mi) or 14.0% is settled (buildings or roads), 0.01 km^{2} (2.5 acres) or 0.1% is either rivers or lakes and 0.01 km^{2} (2.5 acres) or 0.1% is unproductive land.

Of the built up area, industrial buildings made up 1.2% of the total area while housing and buildings made up 7.4% and transportation infrastructure made up 4.2%. Out of the forested land, 20.7% of the total land area is heavily forested and 2.3% is covered with orchards or small clusters of trees. Of the agricultural land, 50.4% is used for growing crops and 11.1% is pastures. All the water in the municipality is in lakes.

The municipality was the capital of the Cossonay District until it was dissolved on 31 August 2006, and Cossonay became part of the new district of Morges.

The municipality is located on a plateau, that rises steeply about 130 m (430 ft) above the Venoge river. On the plateau, it consists of the village of Cossonay-ville and the hamlets of Allens. The area of Grands Moulins, the cable works of Cossonay, the train station and the settlement of Cossonay-Gare are at the foot a hill that lies in the municipality of Penthalaz.

The surrounding municipalities are Penthalaz, Gollion, Senarclens, La Chaux, Dizy, and Lussery-Villars, all in the same district.

La Chaux
Dizy
Lussery-Villars
La Chaux

Penthalaz
Senarclens
Gollion
Gollion

== Coat of arms ==
The blazon of the municipal coat of arms is Per pale Azure and Argent.

== Demographics ==
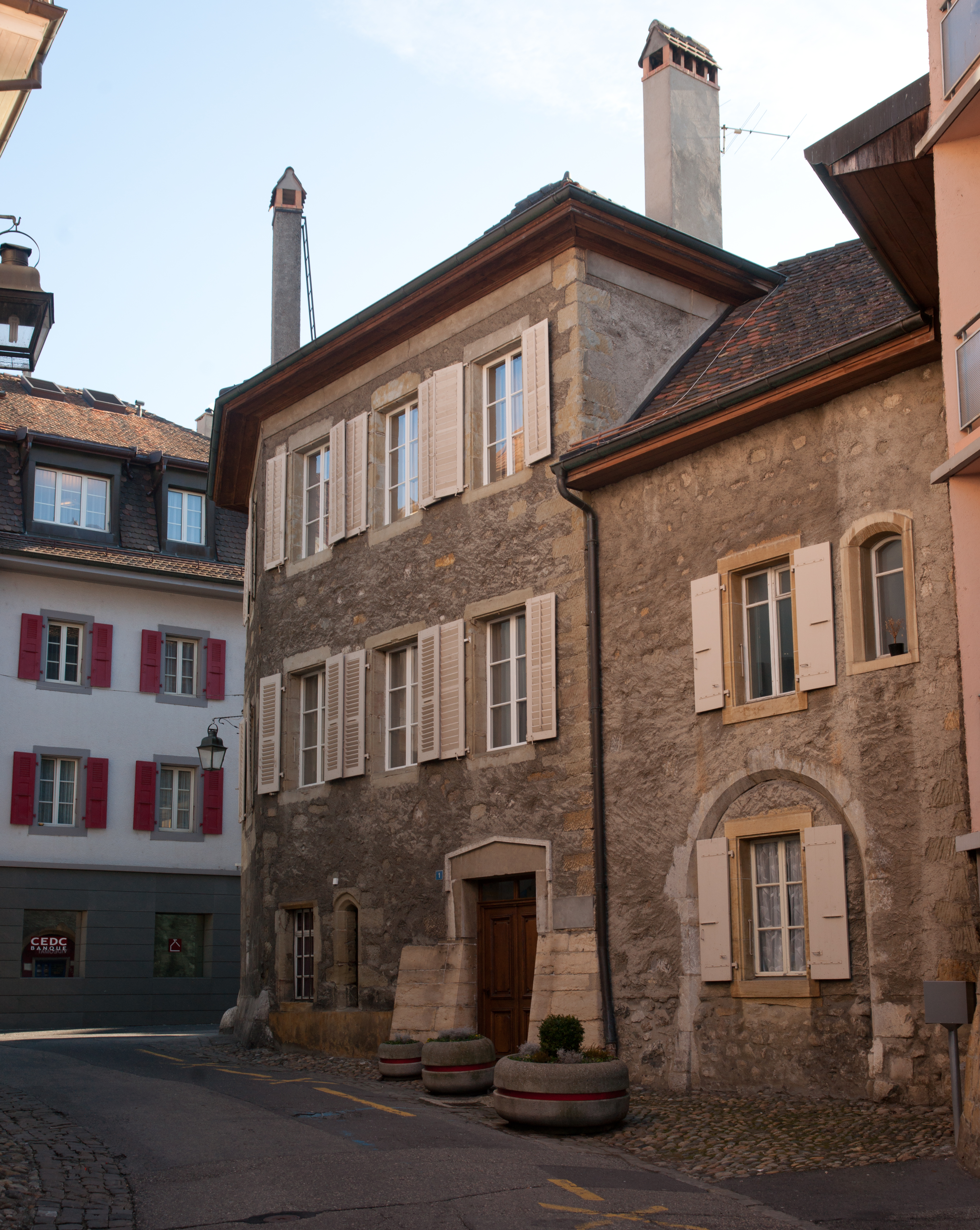
Old town of Cossonay

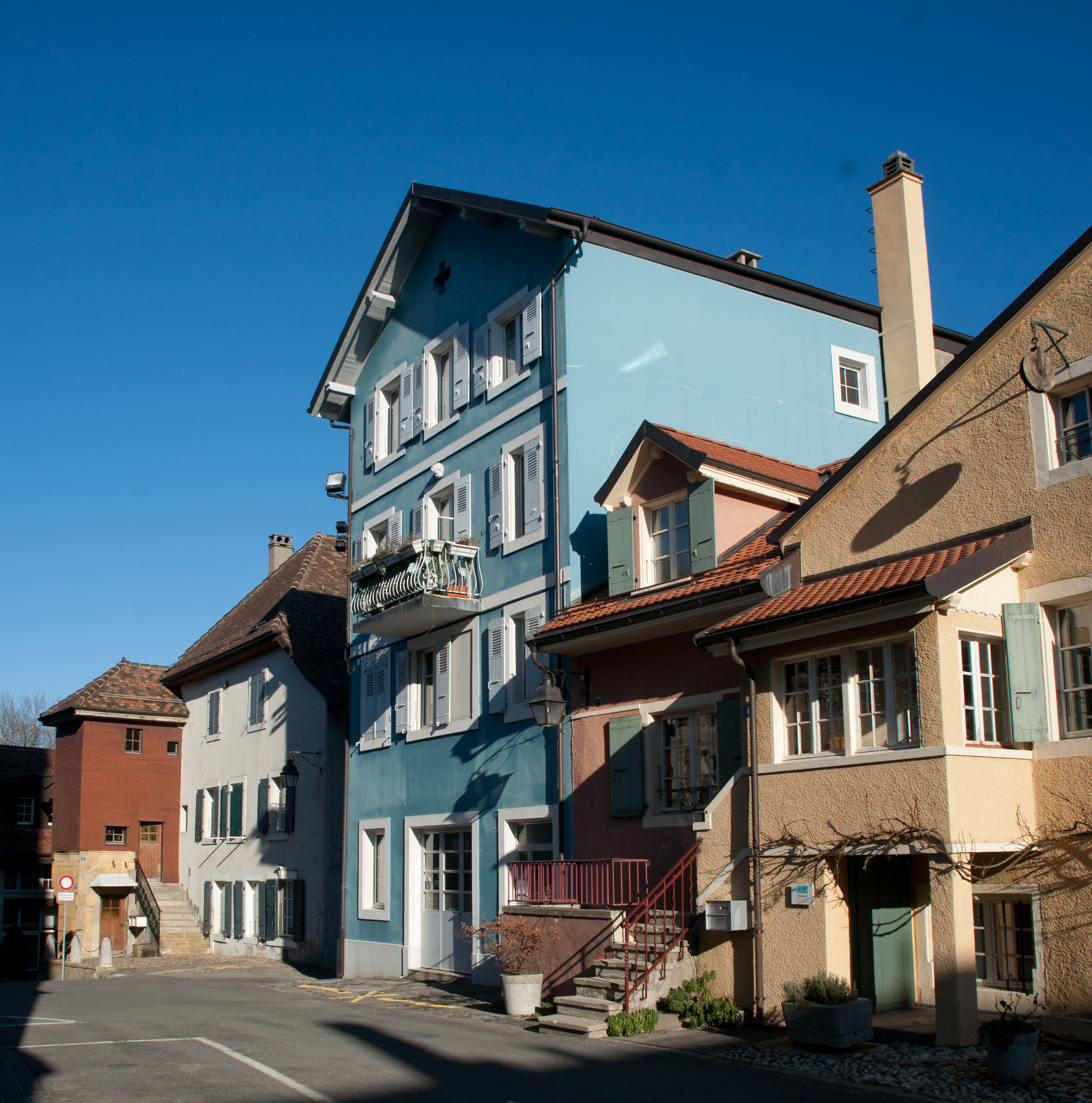
Old town of Cossonay

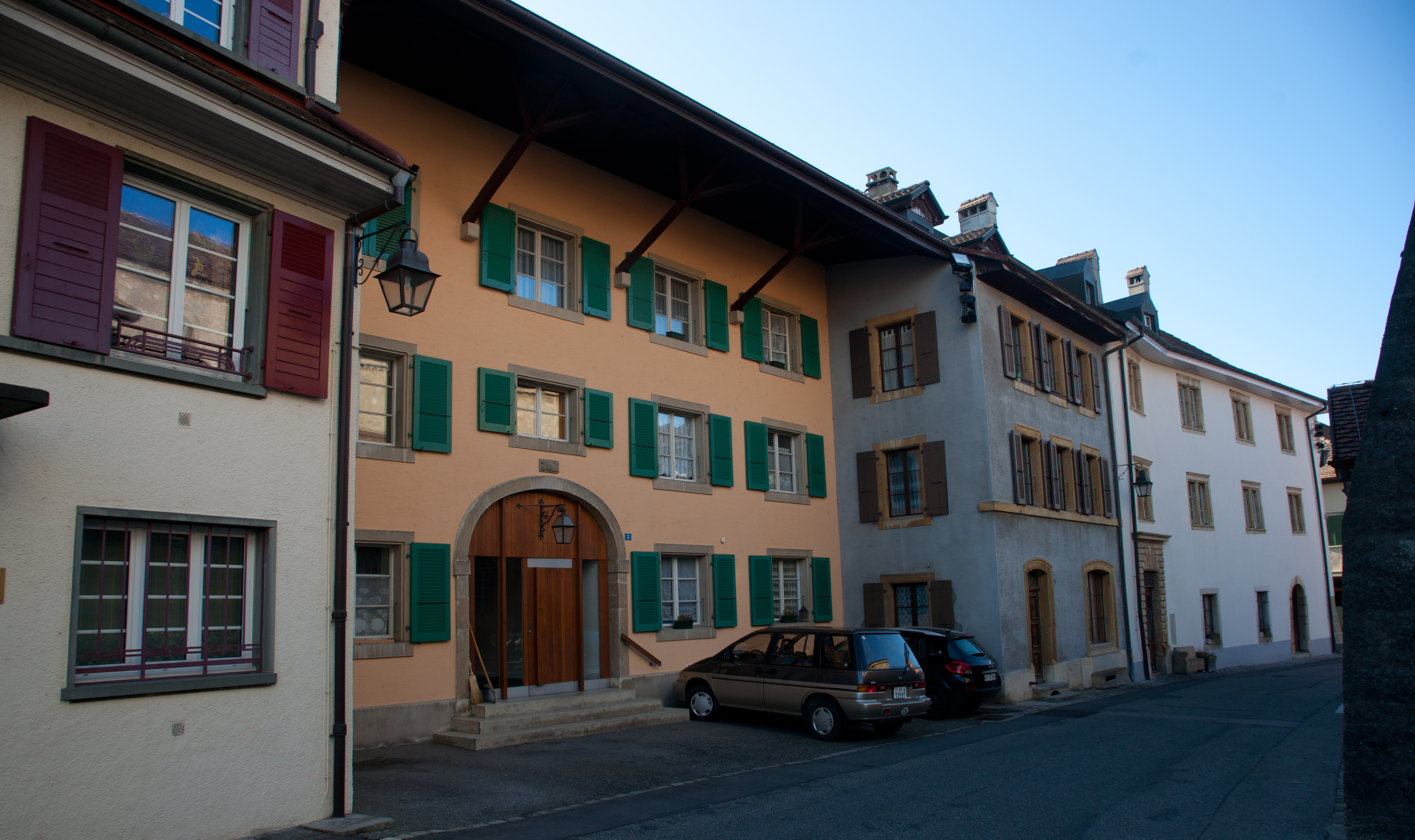
Old town of Cossonay

Cossonay has a population (as of December 2020) of 4,223. As of 2008, 19.3% of the population are resident foreign nationals. Over the last 10 years (1999–2009 ) the population has changed at a rate of 39.7%. It has changed at a rate of 31.5% due to migration and at a rate of 9.1% due to births and deaths.

Most of the population (as of 2000) speaks French (2,278 or 89.1%), with German being second most common (79 or 3.1%) and Portuguese being third (68 or 2.7%). There are 46 people who speak Italian.

Of the population in the municipality 506 or about 19.8% were born in Cossonay and lived there in 2000. There were 1,128 or 44.1% who were born in the same canton, while 354 or 13.8% were born somewhere else in Switzerland, and 497 or 19.4% were born outside of Switzerland.

In 2008 there were 38 live births to Swiss citizens and 8 births to non-Swiss citizens, and in same time span there were 15 deaths of Swiss citizens and 1 non-Swiss citizen death. Ignoring immigration and emigration, the population of Swiss citizens increased by 23 while the foreign population increased by 7. There were 5 Swiss men and 5 Swiss women who immigrated back to Switzerland. At the same time, there were 17 non-Swiss men and 20 non-Swiss women who immigrated from another country to Switzerland. The total Swiss population change in 2008 (from all sources, including moves across municipal borders) was an increase of 66 and the non-Swiss population increased by 19 people. This represents a population growth rate of 2.6%.

The age distribution, as of 2009, in Cossonay is; 402 children or 12.1% of the population are between 0 and 9 years old and 488 teenagers or 14.7% are between 10 and 19. Of the adult population, 438 people or 13.2% of the population are between 20 and 29 years old. 465 people or 14.0% are between 30 and 39, 621 people or 18.7% are between 40 and 49, and 398 people or 12.0% are between 50 and 59. The senior population distribution is 283 people or 8.5% of the population are between 60 and 69 years old, 131 people or 4.0% are between 70 and 79, there are 70 people or 2.1% who are between 80 and 89, and there are 19 people or 0.6% who are 90 and older.

As of 2000, there were 1,119 people who were single and never married in the municipality. There were 1,211 married individuals, 103 widows or widowers and 125 individuals who are divorced.

As of 2000, there were 1,050 private households in the municipality, and an average of 2.4 persons per household. There were 333 households that consist of only one person and 77 households with five or more people. Out of a total of 1,069 households that answered this question, 31.2% were households made up of just one person and there were 5 adults who lived with their parents. Of the rest of the households, there are 251 married couples without children, 376 married couples with children There were 73 single parents with a child or children. There were 12 households that were made up of unrelated people and 19 households that were made up of some sort of institution or another collective housing.

In 2000 there were 222 single family homes (or 48.2% of the total) out of a total of 461 inhabited buildings. There were 121 multi-family buildings (26.2%), along with 84 multi-purpose buildings that were mostly used for housing (18.2%) and 34 other use buildings (commercial or industrial) that also had some housing (7.4%). Of the single family homes 38 were built before 1919, while 60 were built between 1990 and 2000. The greatest number of single family homes (49) were built between 1981 and 1990. The most multi-family homes (40) were built before 1919 and the next most (22) were built between 1996 and 2000.

In 2000 there were 1,137 apartments in the municipality. The most common apartment size was 3 rooms of which there were 353. There were 45 single room apartments and 271 apartments with five or more rooms. Of these apartments, a total of 1,032 apartments (90.8% of the total) were permanently occupied, while 86 apartments (7.6%) were seasonally occupied and 19 apartments (1.7%) were empty. As of 2009, the construction rate of new housing units was 0.9 new units per 1000 residents. The vacancy rate for the municipality, in 2010, was 0.28%.

The historical population is given in the following chart:

== Heritage sites of national significance ==
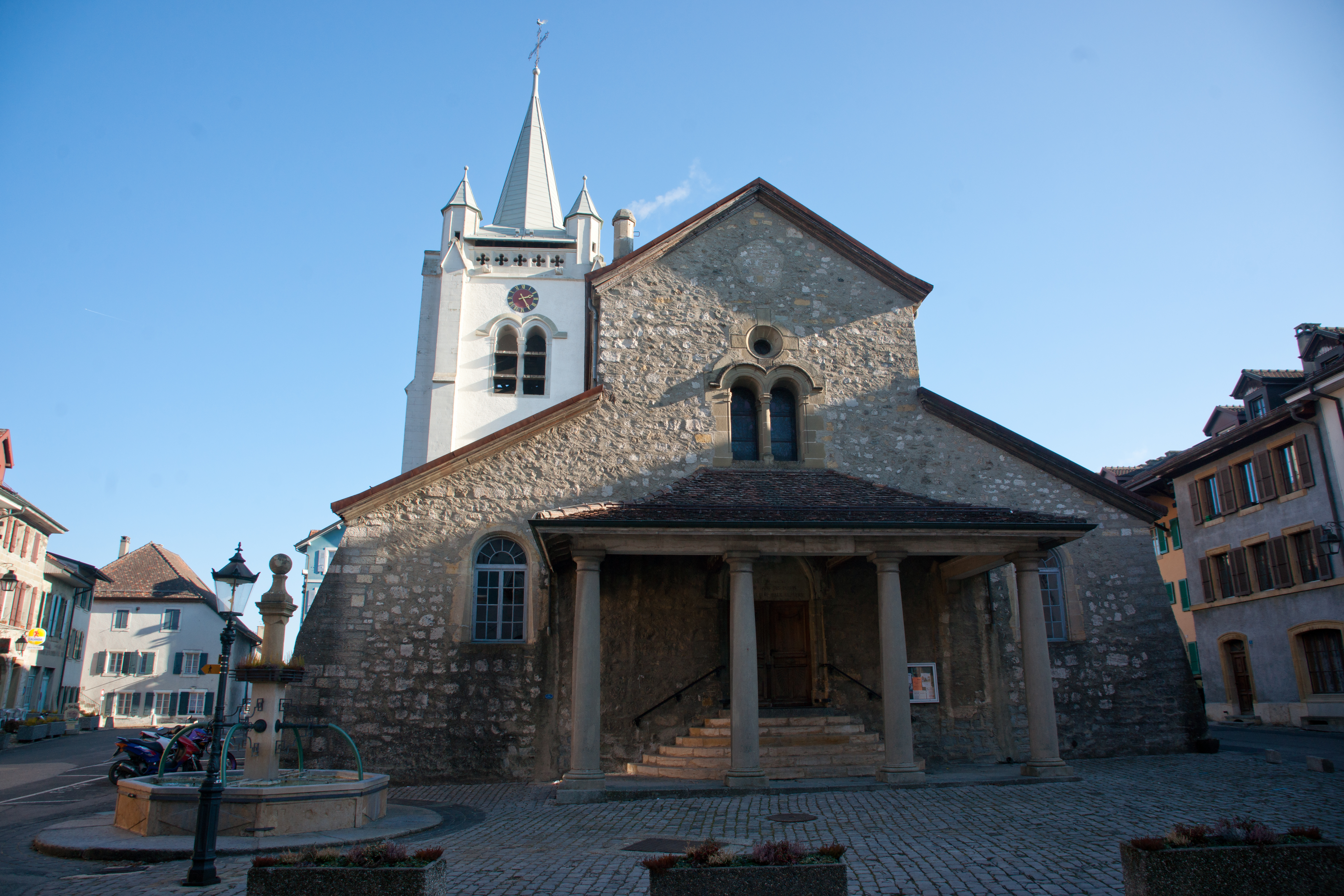
Church in Cossonay

The Swiss Reformed Church of St-Pierre and St-Paul is listed as a Swiss heritage site of national significance. The entire town of Cossonay and the village of La Chaux is part of the Inventory of Swiss Heritage Sites.

== Politics ==
In the 2007 federal election the most popular party was the SP which received 26.91% of the vote. The next three most popular parties were the SVP (17.9%), the FDP (14.91%) and the Green Party (14.72%). In the federal election, a total of 790 votes were cast, and the voter turnout was 40.5%.

== Economy ==
Cossonay was an agricultural town into the 20th century. Until the 15th century, it was a wine-growing region, but since then, other crops and cattle have dominated.

Mills were built along the Venoge in the 16th century. Industrialization came in the 19th century. Now, many workers commute to the metropolitan area of Lausanne.

As of 2010, Cossonay had an unemployment rate of 3.8%. As of 2008, there were 46 people employed in the primary economic sector and about 16 businesses involved in this sector. 174 people were employed in the secondary sector and there were 28 businesses in this sector. 973 people were employed in the tertiary sector, with 116 businesses in this sector. There were 1,388 residents of the municipality who were employed in some capacity, of which females made up 44.1% of the workforce.

In 2008 the total number of full-time equivalent jobs was 953. The number of jobs in the primary sector was 31, all of which were in agriculture. The number of jobs in the secondary sector was 166 of which 42 or (25.3%) were in manufacturing and 109 (65.7%) were in construction. The number of jobs in the tertiary sector was 756. In the tertiary sector; 162 or 21.4% were in wholesale or retail sales or the repair of motor vehicles, 30 or 4.0% were in the movement and storage of goods, 57 or 7.5% were in a hotel or restaurant, 5 or 0.7% were in the information industry, 166 or 22.0% were the insurance or financial industry, 30 or 4.0% were technical professionals or scientists, 102 or 13.5% were in education and 92 or 12.2% were in health care.

In 2000, there were 551 workers who commuted into the municipality and 1,014 workers who commuted away. The municipality is a net exporter of workers, with about 1.8 workers leaving the municipality for every one entering. Of the working population, 13.2% used public transportation to get to work, and 66.2% used a private car.

== Religion ==
From the 2000 census, 763 or 29.8% were Roman Catholic, while 1,183 or 46.2% belonged to the Swiss Reformed Church. Of the rest of the population, there were 12 members of an Orthodox church (or about 0.47% of the population), there was 1 individual who belongs to the Christian Catholic Church, and there were 160 individuals (or about 6.25% of the population) who belonged to another Christian church. There was 1 individual who was Jewish, and 58 (or about 2.27% of the population) who were Islamic. There were 3 individuals who were Buddhist, 2 individuals who were Hindu and 2 individuals who belonged to another church. 329 (or about 12.86% of the population) belonged to no church, are agnostic or atheist, and 122 individuals (or about 4.77% of the population) did not answer the question.

== Weather ==
Cossonay has an average of 116.7 days of rain or snow per year and on average receives 909 mm (35.8 in) of precipitation. The wettest month is June during which time Cossonay receives an average of 93 mm (3.7 in) of rain or snow. During this month there is precipitation for an average of 10.2 days. The month with the most days of precipitation is May, with an average of 12.7, but with only 83 mm (3.3 in) of rain or snow. The driest month of the year is April with an average of 64 mm (2.5 in) of precipitation over 9.4 days.

== Education ==
In Cossonay about 968 or (37.8%) of the population have completed non-mandatory upper secondary education, and 351 or (13.7%) have completed additional higher education (either university or a Fachhochschule). Of the 351 who completed tertiary schooling, 51.3% were Swiss men, 29.9% were Swiss women, 11.1% were non-Swiss men and 7.7% were non-Swiss women.

In the 2009/2010 school year there were a total of 508 students in the Cossonay school district. In the Vaud cantonal school system, two years of non-obligatory pre-school are provided by the political districts. During the school year, the political district provided pre-school care for a total of 631 children of which 203 children (32.2%) received subsidized pre-school care. The canton's primary school program requires students to attend for four years. There were 257 students in the municipal primary school program. The obligatory lower secondary school program lasts for six years and there were 251 students in those schools.

As of 2000, there were 529 students in Cossonay who came from another municipality, while 112 residents attended schools outside the municipality.

== Transportation ==
Cossonay lies at the crossroads of the highways from Morges to Orbe and from Lausanne over Col du Mollendruz to the Vallée_de_Joux. The motorway entrance to the A1 (Lausanne-Yverdon) is about 5 km from the center, and opened in 1981.

In 1855, the railway line Yverdon-Bussigny-près-Lausanne opened a train station at Cossonay-Gare, and the station is today served by three routes of the RER Vaud commuter train network. Cossonay-Gare is linked to Cossonay-Ville by the Cossonay–Gare–Ville funicular.

Postal buses run from Cossonay-Gare to Cheseaux-sur-Lausanne and L'Isle, as well as from Cossonay-Ville to Cottens and to Morges.

== Notable people ==
- Marcel Pilet-Golaz (1889 in Cossonay – 1958) a Swiss politician, served on the Swiss Federal Council 1928-1944
- Ervin Y. Galantay (1930-2011) a Hungarian-American architect, lived most of his life in Cossonay
