= Lussery-Villars =

- Municipality
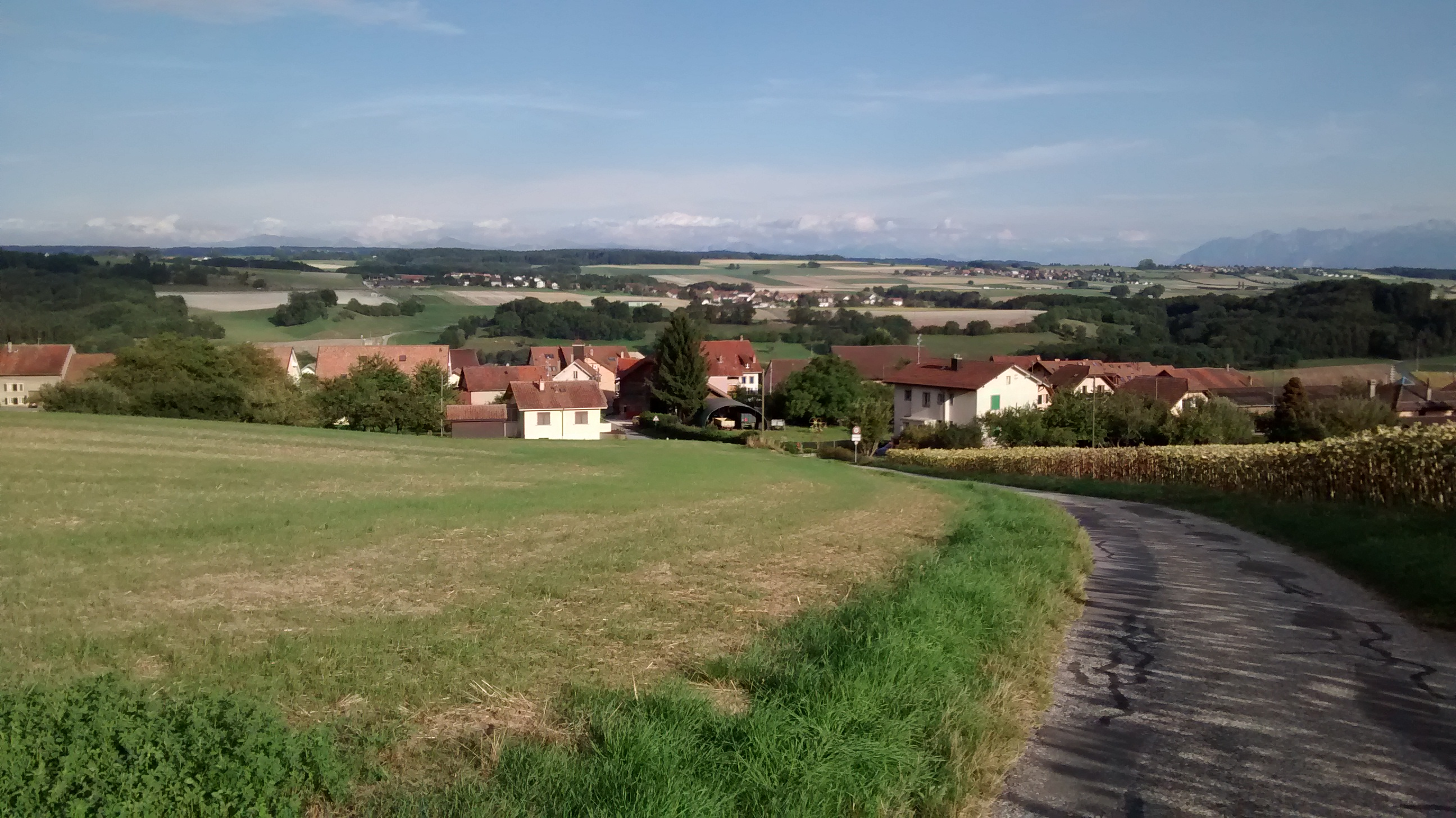

- Flag Coat of arms
- Location of Lussery-Villars
- Location within Switzerland Location within Canton of Vaud
- Coordinates: 46°38′N 06°32′E
- Country: Switzerland
- Canton: Vaud
- District: Gros-de-Vaud

Government
  - Mayor: Syndic

Area
  - Total: 3.73 km^{2} (1.44 sq mi)
- Elevation: 494 m (1,621 ft)

Population (2003)
  - Total: 326
  - Density: 87.4/km^{2} (226/sq mi)
- Time zone: UTC+01:00 (CET)
  - Summer (DST): UTC+02:00 (CEST)
- Postal code: 1307
- SFOS number: 5487
- ISO 3166 code: CH-VD
- Surrounded by: Cossonay, Daillens, Dizy, Eclépens, La Sarraz, Penthalaz
- Website: www.lussery-villars.ch

Lussery-Villars is a municipality of the canton of Vaud in Switzerland, located in the district of Gros-de-Vaud. On 1 January 1999, Lussery and Villars-Lussery were united to form the municipality.

== History ==
Lussery is first mentioned in 1147 as Luseri.

== Geography ==
Lussery-Villars has an area, as of 2009, of 3.73 square kilometers (1.44 sq mi). Of this area, 3.08 km^{2} (1.19 sq mi) or 82.6% is used for agricultural purposes, while 0.37 km^{2} (0.14 sq mi) or 9.9% is forested. Of the rest of the land, 0.25 km^{2} (0.097 sq mi) or 6.7% is settled (buildings or roads), 0.03 km^{2} (7.4 acres) or 0.8% is either rivers or lakes. Of the built up area, housing and buildings made up 2.9% and transportation infrastructure made up 3.5%. Out of the forested land, 7.8% of the total land area is heavily forested and 2.1% is covered with orchards or small clusters of trees. Of the agricultural land, 70.2% is used for growing crops and 12.1% is pastures. All the water in the municipality is flowing water.

The municipality was part of the Cossonay District until it was dissolved on 31 August 2006, and Lussery-Villars became part of the new district of Gros-de-Vaud.

== Coat of arms ==
The blazon of the municipal coat of arms is Per fess: 1. Argent semee of Billets Sable, semi Lion rampant issuant, armed of the first and langued Gules; 2. Sable, three Bendlets sinister Argent, a Mining-wheel issuant from chief Or.

== Demographics ==
Lussery-Villars has a population (as of December 2020) of 458. As of 2008, 14.3% of the population are resident foreign nationals. Over the last 10 years (1999–2009 ) the population has changed at a rate of 7.7%. It has changed at a rate of 5.6% due to migration and at a rate of 1.5% due to births and deaths.

Most of the population (as of 2000) speaks French (307 or 93.9%), with German being second most common (9 or 2.8%) and Italian being third (4 or 1.2%).

Of the population in the municipality 83 or about 25.4% were born in Lussery-Villars and lived there in 2000. There were 164 or 50.2% who were born in the same canton, while 37 or 11.3% were born somewhere else in Switzerland, and 41 or 12.5% were born outside of Switzerland.

In 2008 there were 4 live births to Swiss citizens and were 4 deaths of Swiss citizens. Ignoring immigration and emigration, the population of Swiss citizens remained the same while the foreign population remained the same. There was 1 Swiss woman who immigrated back to Switzerland. At the same time, there were 4 non-Swiss men who immigrated from another country to Switzerland. The total Swiss population change in 2008 (from all sources, including moves across municipal borders) was an increase of 4 and the non-Swiss population increased by 9 people. This represents a population growth rate of 4.0%.

The age distribution, as of 2009, in Lussery-Villars is as follows; 25 children or 7.2% of the population are between 0 and 9 years old and 52 teenagers or 14.9% are between 10 and 19. Of the adult population, 42 people or 12.0% of the population are between 20 and 29 years old. 49 people or 14.0% are between 30 and 39, 75 people or 21.5% are between 40 and 49, and 50 people or 14.3% are between 50 and 59. The senior population distribution is 23 people or 6.6% of the population are between 60 and 69 years old, 26 people or 7.4% are between 70 and 79, there are 6 people or 1.7% who are between 80 and 89, and there 1 person who is 90 and older.

As of 2000, there were 137 people who were single and never married in the municipality. There were 162 married individuals, 13 widows or widowers and 15 individuals who are divorced.

As of 2000, there were 133 private households in the municipality, and an average of 2.4 persons per household. There were 41 households that consist of only one person and 8 households with five or more people. Out of a total of 137 households that answered this question, 29.9% were households made up of just one person and there was 1 adult who lived with their parents. Of the rest of the households, there are 35 married couples without children, 50 married couples with children There were 3 single parents with a child or children. There were 3 households that were made up of unrelated people and 4 households that were made up of some sort of institution or another collective housing.

In 2000 there were 41 single family homes (or 53.2% of the total) out of a total of 77 inhabited buildings. There were 13 multi-family buildings (16.9%), along with 21 multi-purpose buildings that were mostly used for housing (27.3%) and 2 other use buildings (commercial or industrial) that also had some housing (2.6%). Of the single family homes 12 were built before 1919, while 3 were built between 1990 and 2000. The most multi-family homes (5) were built between 1991 and 1995 and the next most (4) were built between 1981 and 1990. In 2000 there were 137 apartments in the municipality. The most common apartment size was 4 rooms of which there were 41. There were 7 single room apartments and 37 apartments with five or more rooms. Of these apartments, a total of 125 apartments (91.2% of the total) were permanently occupied, while 10 apartments (7.3%) were seasonally occupied and 2 apartments (1.5%) were empty.

As of 2009, the construction rate of new housing units was 17.2 new units per 1000 residents. The vacancy rate for the municipality, in 2010, was 0%.

The historical population is given in the following chart:

== Politics ==
In the 2007 federal election the most popular party was the SVP which received 30.01% of the vote. The next three most popular parties were the SP (25.24%), the FDP (11.59%) and the Green Party (10.46%). In the federal election, a total of 109 votes were cast, and the voter turnout was 48.4%.

== Economy ==
As of 2010, Lussery-Villars had an unemployment rate of 3.1%. As of 2008, there were 19 people employed in the primary economic sector and about 9 businesses involved in this sector. 3 people were employed in the secondary sector and there were 2 businesses in this sector. 6 people were employed in the tertiary sector, with 5 businesses in this sector.

There were 172 residents of the municipality who were employed in some capacity, of which females made up 41.3% of the workforce. In 2008 the total number of full-time equivalent jobs was 23. The number of jobs in the primary sector was 15, all of which were in agriculture. The number of jobs in the secondary sector was two, of which one was in manufacturing and one was in construction. The number of jobs in the tertiary sector was 6. In the tertiary sector; 2 or 33.3% were in a hotel or restaurant, 2 or 33.3% were in the information industry, 1 was a technical professional or scientist, 1 was in education.

In 2000, there were 7 workers who commuted into the municipality and 147 workers who commuted away. The municipality is a net exporter of workers, with about 21.0 workers leaving the municipality for every one entering. Of the working population, 3.5% used public transportation to get to work, and 80.8% used a private car.

== Religion ==
From the 2000 census, 68 or 20.8% were Roman Catholic, while 201 or 61.5% belonged to the Swiss Reformed Church. Of the rest of the population, there were 10 individuals (or about 3.06% of the population) who belonged to another Christian church. 47 (or about 14.37% of the population) belonged to no church, are agnostic or atheist, and 6 individuals (or about 1.83% of the population) did not answer the question.

== Education ==
In Lussery-Villars about 115 or (35.2%) of the population have completed non-mandatory upper secondary education, and 54 or (16.5%) have completed additional higher education (either university or a Fachhochschule). Of the 54 who completed tertiary schooling, 53.7% were Swiss men, 31.5% were Swiss women, 11.1% were non-Swiss men.

In the 2009/2010 school year, there were a total of 34 students in the Lussery-Villars school district. In the Vaud cantonal school system, two years of non-obligatory pre-school are provided by the political districts. During the school year, the political district provided pre-school care for a total of 296 children of which 96 children (32.4%) received subsidized pre-school care. The canton's primary school program requires students to attend for four years. There were 14 students in the municipal primary school program. The obligatory lower secondary school program lasts for six years and there were 20 students in those schools.

As of 2000, there were 8 students in Lussery-Villars who came from another municipality, while 58 residents attended schools outside the municipality.
