= Vullierens =

- Municipality
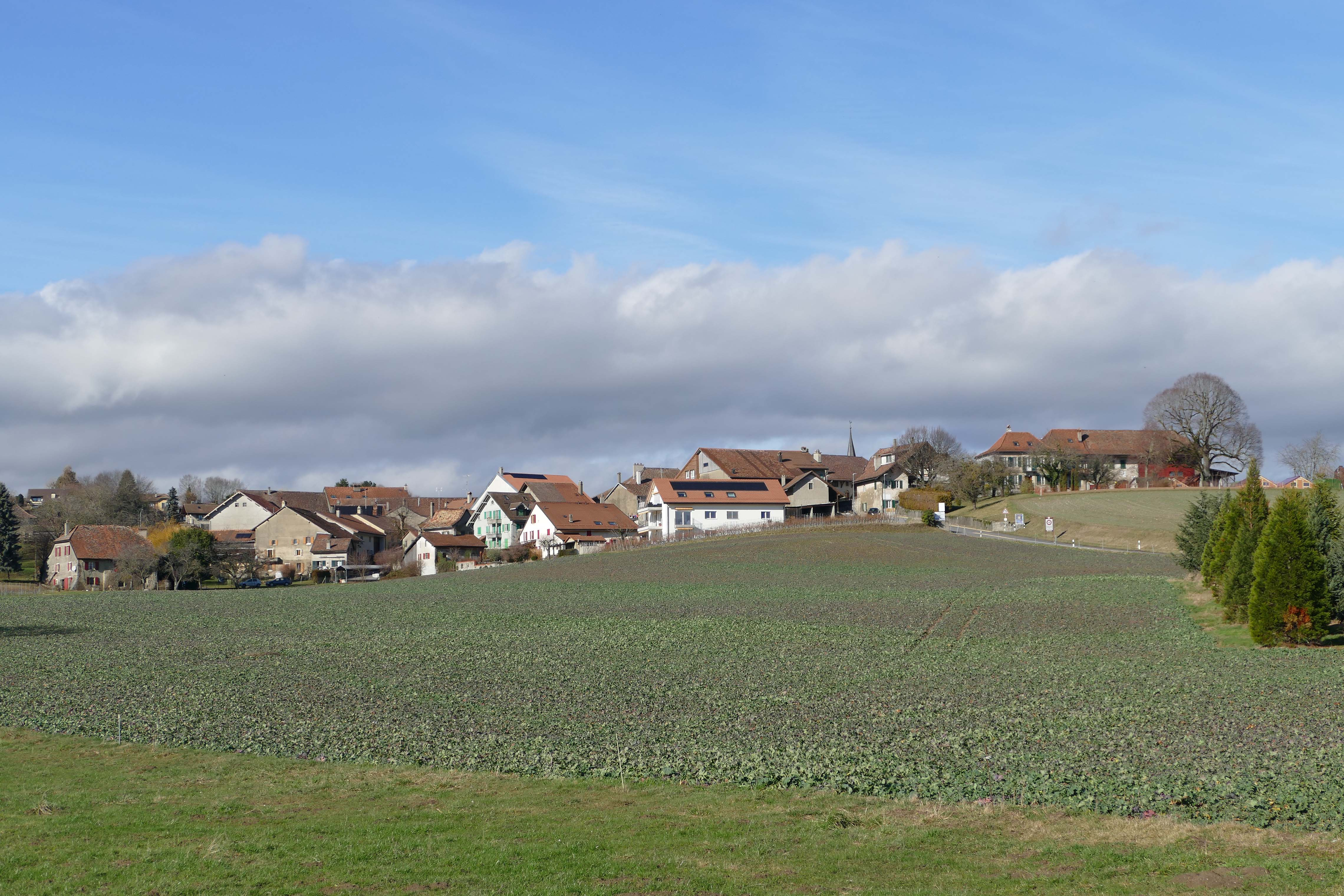
- Village of Vullierens

- Flag Coat of arms
- Location of Vullierens
- Location within Switzerland Location within Canton of Vaud
- Coordinates: 46°34′N 06°29′E
- Country: Switzerland
- Canton: Vaud
- District: Morges

Government
  - Mayor: Syndic; Michel Maillefer

Area
  - Total: 6.84 km^{2} (2.64 sq mi)
- Elevation: 528 m (1,732 ft)

Population (2003)
  - Total: 407
  - Density: 59.5/km^{2} (154/sq mi)
- Time zone: UTC+01:00 (CET)
  - Summer (DST): UTC+02:00 (CEST)
- Postal code: 1115
- SFOS number: 5654
- ISO 3166 code: CH-VD
- Surrounded by: Aclens, Colombier, Cottens, Gollion, Grancy, Saint-Saphorin-sur-Morges, Senarclens
- Website: www.vullierens.ch

Vullierens is a municipality in the Swiss canton of Vaud, located in the district of Morges. Vullierens is known for its castle, iris gardens and banqueting center "Portes des Iris".

== Geography ==
Aerial view (1949)

Vullierens has an area, as of 2009, of 6.8 square kilometers (2.6 mi^{2}). Of this area, 5.77 km^{2} (2.23 mi^{2}) or 84.4% is used for agricultural purposes, while 0.63 km^{2} (0.24 mi^{2}) or 9.2% is forested. Of the rest of the land, 0.44 km^{2} (0.17 mi^{2}) or 6.4% is settled (buildings or roads) and 0.01 km^{2} (2.5 acres) or 0.1% is unproductive land.

Of the built up area, housing and buildings made up 3.7% and transportation infrastructure made up 2.6%. Out of the forested land, 7.9% of the total land area is heavily forested and 1.3% is covered with orchards or small clusters of trees. Of the agricultural land, 72.4% is used for growing crops and 6.9% is pastures, while 5.1% is used for orchards or vine crops.

The municipality was part of the Morges District until it was dissolved on 31 August 2006, and Vullierens became part of the new district of Morges.

== Coat of arms ==
The blazon of the municipal coat of arms is Gules, in chief a Castle with three Towers Or, in base two Sea-daces addorsed Argent.

== Demographics ==
Vullierens has a population (as of December 2020) of 542. As of 2008, 11.5% of the population are resident foreign nationals. Over the last 10 years (1999–2009 ) the population has changed at a rate of -0.7%. It has changed at a rate of -3.1% due to migration and at a rate of 2.1% due to births and deaths.

Most of the population (as of 2000) speaks French (371 or 92.3%), with English being second most common (13 or 3.2%) and German being third (12 or 3.0%).

Of the population in the municipality 129 or about 32.1% were born in Vullierens and lived there in 2000. There were 169 or 42.0% who were born in the same canton, while 44 or 10.9% were born somewhere else in Switzerland, and 43 or 10.7% were born outside of Switzerland.

In 2008 there were 3 live births to Swiss citizens and were 2 deaths of Swiss citizens and 1 non-Swiss citizen death. Ignoring immigration and emigration, the population of Swiss citizens increased by 1 while the foreign population decreased by 1. At the same time, there were 3 non-Swiss men and 2 non-Swiss women who immigrated from another country to Switzerland. The total Swiss population change in 2008 (from all sources, including moves across municipal borders) was an increase of 4 and the non-Swiss population increased by 2 people. This represents a population growth rate of 1.5%.

The age distribution, as of 2009, in Vullierens is; 36 children or 8.6% of the population are between 0 and 9 years old and 56 teenagers or 13.4% are between 10 and 19. Of the adult population, 45 people or 10.8% of the population are between 20 and 29 years old. 44 people or 10.6% are between 30 and 39, 90 people or 21.6% are between 40 and 49, and 58 people or 13.9% are between 50 and 59. The senior population distribution is 34 people or 8.2% of the population are between 60 and 69 years old, 37 people or 8.9% are between 70 and 79, there are 15 people or 3.6% who are between 80 and 89, and there are 2 people or 0.5% who are 90 and older.

As of 2000, there were 169 people who were single and never married in the municipality. There were 190 married individuals, 24 widows or widowers and 19 individuals who are divorced.

As of 2000, there were 163 private households in the municipality, and an average of 2.4 persons per household. There were 47 households that consist of only one person and 12 households with five or more people. Out of a total of 167 households that answered this question, 28.1% were households made up of just one person and there were 2 adults who lived with their parents. Of the rest of the households, there are 47 married couples without children, 56 married couples with children There were 9 single parents with a child or children. There were 2 households that were made up of unrelated people and 4 households that were made up of some sort of institution or another collective housing.

In 2000 there were 61 single family homes (or 50.4% of the total) out of a total of 121 inhabited buildings. There were 18 multi-family buildings (14.9%), along with 33 multi-purpose buildings that were mostly used for housing (27.3%) and 9 other use buildings (commercial or industrial) that also had some housing (7.4%). Of the single family homes 24 were built before 1919, while 5 were built between 1990 and 2000. The most multi-family homes (11) were built before 1919 and the next most (2) were built between 1961 and 1970. There was 1 multi-family house built between 1996 and 2000.

In 2000 there were 167 apartments in the municipality. The most common apartment size was 4 rooms of which there were 54. There were 5 single room apartments and 64 apartments with five or more rooms. Of these apartments, a total of 158 apartments (94.6% of the total) were permanently occupied, while 7 apartments (4.2%) were seasonally occupied and 2 apartments (1.2%) were empty. As of 2009, the construction rate of new housing units was 0 new units per 1000 residents. The vacancy rate for the municipality, in 2010, was 1.11%.

The historical population is given in the following chart:

== Heritage sites of national significance ==
Vullierens Castle and the surrounding gardens and buildings are listed as a Swiss heritage site of national significance. The entire village of Vullierens is part of the Inventory of Swiss Heritage Sites.

== Politics ==
In the 2007 federal election the most popular party was the SVP which received 23.48% of the vote. The next three most popular parties were the FDP (20.19%), the SP (18.91%) and the Green Party (11.24%). In the federal election, a total of 155 votes were cast, and the voter turnout was 55.4%.

== Economy ==
As of 2010, Vullierens had an unemployment rate of 3.7%. As of 2008, there were 44 people employed in the primary economic sector and about 15 businesses involved in this sector. 24 people were employed in the secondary sector and there were 6 businesses in this sector. 22 people were employed in the tertiary sector, with 9 businesses in this sector. There were 185 residents of the municipality who were employed in some capacity, of which females made up 41.6% of the workforce.

In 2008 the total number of full-time equivalent jobs was 71. The number of jobs in the primary sector was 30, all of which were in agriculture. The number of jobs in the secondary sector was 23 of which 19 or (82.6%) were in manufacturing and 4 (17.4%) were in construction. The number of jobs in the tertiary sector was 18. In the tertiary sector; 4 or 22.2% were in wholesale or retail sales or the repair of motor vehicles, 3 or 16.7% were in a hotel or restaurant, 1 was in the information industry, 3 or 16.7% were in education.

In 2000, there were 13 workers who commuted into the municipality and 128 workers who commuted away. The municipality is a net exporter of workers, with about 9.8 workers leaving the municipality for every one entering. Of the working population, 5.4% used public transportation to get to work, and 66.5% used a private car.

== Religion ==
From the 2000 census, 55 or 13.7% were Roman Catholic, while 273 or 67.9% belonged to the Swiss Reformed Church. Of the rest of the population, there was 1 member of an Orthodox church, and there were 22 individuals (or about 5.47% of the population) who belonged to another Christian church. There was 1 person who was Buddhist. 47 (or about 11.69% of the population) belonged to no church, are agnostic or atheist, and 13 individuals (or about 3.23% of the population) did not answer the question.

== Education ==
In Vullierens about 134 or (33.3%) of the population have completed non-mandatory upper secondary education, and 72 or (17.9%) have completed additional higher education (either university or a Fachhochschule). Of the 72 who completed tertiary schooling, 58.3% were Swiss men, 27.8% were Swiss women, 8.3% were non-Swiss men.

In the 2009/2010 school year there were a total of 48 students in the Vullierens school district. In the Vaud cantonal school system, two years of non-obligatory pre-school are provided by the political districts. During the school year, the political district provided pre-school care for a total of 631 children of which 203 children (32.2%) received subsidized pre-school care. The canton's primary school program requires students to attend for four years. There were 24 students in the municipal primary school program. The obligatory lower secondary school program lasts for six years and there were 24 students in those schools.

As of 2000, there were 41 students in Vullierens who came from another municipality, while 79 residents attended schools outside the municipality.
