= Senarclens =

- Municipality
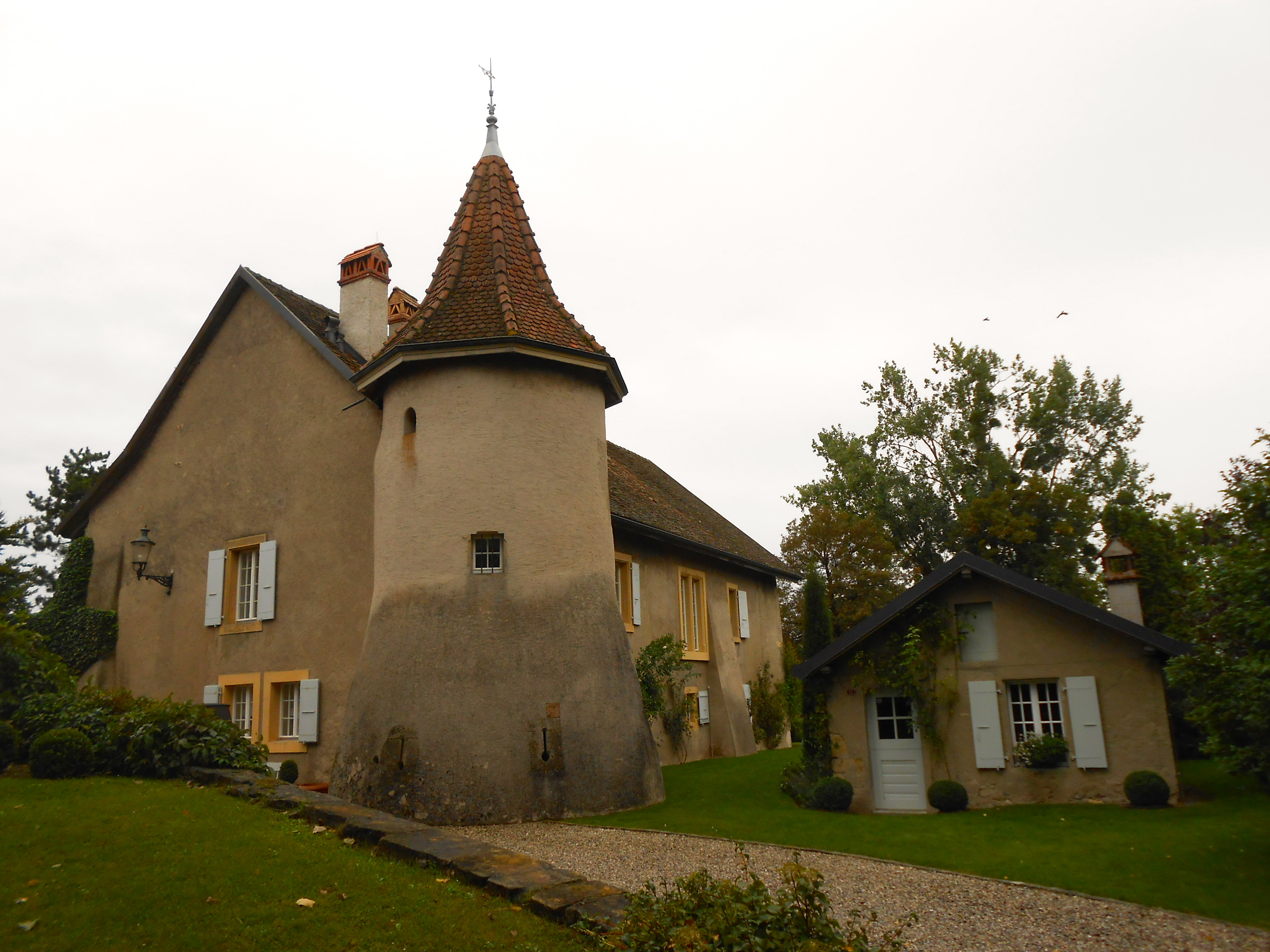

- Flag Coat of arms
- Location of Senarclens
- Location within Switzerland Location within Canton of Vaud
- Coordinates: 46°36′N 06°29′E
- Country: Switzerland
- Canton: Vaud
- District: Morges

Government
  - Mayor: Syndic; Ruedi Plüss

Area
  - Total: 3.97 km^{2} (1.53 sq mi)
- Elevation: 582 m (1,909 ft)

Population (2003)
  - Total: 335
  - Density: 84.4/km^{2} (219/sq mi)
- Time zone: UTC+01:00 (CET)
  - Summer (DST): UTC+02:00 (CEST)
- Postal code: 1304
- SFOS number: 5499
- ISO 3166 code: CH-VD
- Surrounded by: Cossonay, Gollion, Vullierens, Grancy, La Chaux
- Website: https://senarclens.ch/ Profile (in French), SFSO statistics

Senarclens is a municipality of the canton of Vaud in Switzerland, located in the district of Morges.

== History ==
Senarclens is first mentioned in 1011 as Senerclens.

== Geography ==
Senarclens has an area, as of 2009, of 3.97 square kilometers (1.53 sq mi). Of this area, 3.45 km^{2} (1.33 sq mi) or 86.9% is used for agricultural purposes, while 0.2 km^{2} (0.077 sq mi) or 5.0% is forested. Of the rest of the land, 0.28 km^{2} (0.11 sq mi) or 7.1% is settled (buildings or roads).

Of the built up area, housing and buildings made up 4.3% and transportation infrastructure made up 2.5%. Out of the forested land, all of the forested land area is covered with heavy forests. Of the agricultural land, 78.3% is used for growing crops and 6.3% is pastures, while 2.3% is used for orchards or vine crops.

The municipality was part of the Cossonay District until it was dissolved on 31 August 2006, and Senarclens became part of the new district of Morges.

The municipality is located in the Morges district, and consists of the village of Senarclens and the hamlets of Bez and Soveillame.

== Coat of arms ==
The blazon of the municipal coat of arms is Or, on a Bend Azure, an Escallop bendwise, a Mullet of Six pierced and a Crescent bendwise all Argent.

== Demographics ==
Senarclens has a population (as of December 2020) of 492. As of 2008, 8.6% of the population are resident foreign nationals. Over the last 10 years (1999–2009 ) the population has changed at a rate of 6.4%. It has changed at a rate of 19.1% due to migration and at a rate of -13% due to births and deaths.

Most of the population (as of 2000) speaks French (321 or 92.0%), with German being second most common (15 or 4.3%) and Portuguese being third (5 or 1.4%). There are 2 people who speak Italian.

Of the population in the municipality 86 or about 24.6% were born in Senarclens and lived there in 2000. There were 157 or 45.0% who were born in the same canton, while 65 or 18.6% were born somewhere else in Switzerland, and 33 or 9.5% were born outside of Switzerland.

In 2008 there were 4 live births to Swiss citizens and were 7 deaths of Swiss citizens. Ignoring immigration and emigration, the population of Swiss citizens decreased by 3 while the foreign population remained the same. There were 2 Swiss men who emigrated from Switzerland. At the same time, there was 1 non-Swiss man and 4 non-Swiss women who immigrated from another country to Switzerland. The total Swiss population change in 2008 (from all sources, including moves across municipal borders) was an increase of 22 and the non-Swiss population increased by 14 people. This represents a population growth rate of 11.0%.

The age distribution, as of 2009, in Senarclens is; 40 children or 10.9% of the population are between 0 and 9 years old and 49 teenagers or 13.3% are between 10 and 19. Of the adult population, 44 people or 12.0% of the population are between 20 and 29 years old. 51 people or 13.9% are between 30 and 39, 56 people or 15.2% are between 40 and 49, and 49 people or 13.3% are between 50 and 59. The senior population distribution is 40 people or 10.9% of the population are between 60 and 69 years old, 29 people or 7.9% are between 70 and 79, there are 10 people or 2.7% who are between 80 and 89.

As of 2000, there were 150 people who were single and never married in the municipality. There were 162 married individuals, 27 widows or widowers and 10 individuals who are divorced.

As of 2000, there were 124 private households in the municipality, and an average of 2.6 persons per household. There were 34 households that consist of only one person and 13 households with five or more people. Out of a total of 126 households that answered this question, 27.0% were households made up of just one person. Of the rest of the households, there are 31 married couples without children, 51 married couples with children There were 5 single parents with a child or children. There were 3 households that were made up of unrelated people and 2 households that were made up of some sort of institution or another collective housing.

In 2000 there were 50 single family homes (or 56.2% of the total) out of a total of 89 inhabited buildings. There were 18 multi-family buildings (20.2%), along with 18 multi-purpose buildings that were mostly used for housing (20.2%) and 3 other use buildings (commercial or industrial) that also had some housing (3.4%). Of the single family homes 4 were built before 1919, while 12 were built between 1990 and 2000. The greatest number of single family homes (16) were built between 1971 and 1980. The most multi-family homes (7) were built before 1919 and the next most (3) were built between 1981 and 1990. There were 2 multi-family houses built between 1996 and 2000.

In 2000 there were 126 apartments in the municipality. The most common apartment size was 4 rooms of which there were 26. There were 4 single room apartments and 52 apartments with five or more rooms. Of these apartments, a total of 121 apartments (96.0% of the total) were permanently occupied, while 2 apartments (1.6%) were seasonally occupied and 3 apartments (2.4%) were empty. As of 2009, the construction rate of new housing units was 0 new units per 1000 residents. The vacancy rate for the municipality, in 2010, was 3.42%.

The historical population is given in the following chart:

== Politics ==
In the 2007 federal election the most popular party was the SVP which received 26.96% of the vote. The next three most popular parties were the FDP (21.55%), the Green Party (12.78%) and the SP (12.56%). In the federal election, a total of 136 votes were cast, and the voter turnout was 57.4%.

== Economy ==
As of 2010, Senarclens had an unemployment rate of 2.8%. As of 2008, there were 38 people employed in the primary economic sector and about 12 businesses involved in this sector. 4 people were employed in the secondary sector and there was 1 business in this sector. 88 people were employed in the tertiary sector, with 8 businesses in this sector. There were 170 residents of the municipality who were employed in some capacity, of which females made up 42.4% of the workforce.

In 2008 the total number of full-time equivalent jobs was 102. The number of jobs in the primary sector was 26, all of which were in agriculture. The number of jobs in the secondary sector was 4, all of which were in construction. The number of jobs in the tertiary sector was 72. In the tertiary sector; 8 or 11.1% were in wholesale or retail sales or the repair of motor vehicles, 21 or 29.2% were in the movement and storage of goods, 2 or 2.8% were in a hotel or restaurant, 3 or 4.2% were in education and 27 or 37.5% were in health care.

In 2000, there were 51 workers who commuted into the municipality and 119 workers who commuted away. The municipality is a net exporter of workers, with about 2.3 workers leaving the municipality for every one entering. Of the working population, 5.9% used public transportation to get to work, and 65.3% used a private car.

== Religion ==
From the 2000 census, 53 or 15.2% were Roman Catholic, while 236 or 67.6% belonged to the Swiss Reformed Church. Of the rest of the population, there were 36 individuals (or about 10.32% of the population) who belonged to another Christian church. There were 1 individual who belonged to another church. 25 (or about 7.16% of the population) belonged to no church, are agnostic or atheist, and 16 individuals (or about 4.58% of the population) did not answer the question.

== Education ==
In Senarclens about 127 or (36.4%) of the population have completed non-mandatory upper secondary education, and 54 or (15.5%) have completed additional higher education (either university or a Fachhochschule). Of the 54 who completed tertiary schooling, 55.6% were Swiss men, 29.6% were Swiss women and 9.3% were non-Swiss women.

In the 2009/2010 school year there were a total of 49 students in the Senarclens school district. In the Vaud cantonal school system, two years of non-obligatory pre-school are provided by the political districts. During the school year, the political district provided pre-school care for a total of 631 children of which 203 children (32.2%) received subsidized pre-school care. The canton's primary school program requires students to attend for four years. There were 30 students in the municipal primary school program. The obligatory lower secondary school program lasts for six years and there were 19 students in those schools.

As of 2000, there was one student in Senarclens who came from another municipality, while 61 residents attended schools outside the municipality.
