= Gollion =

- Municipality
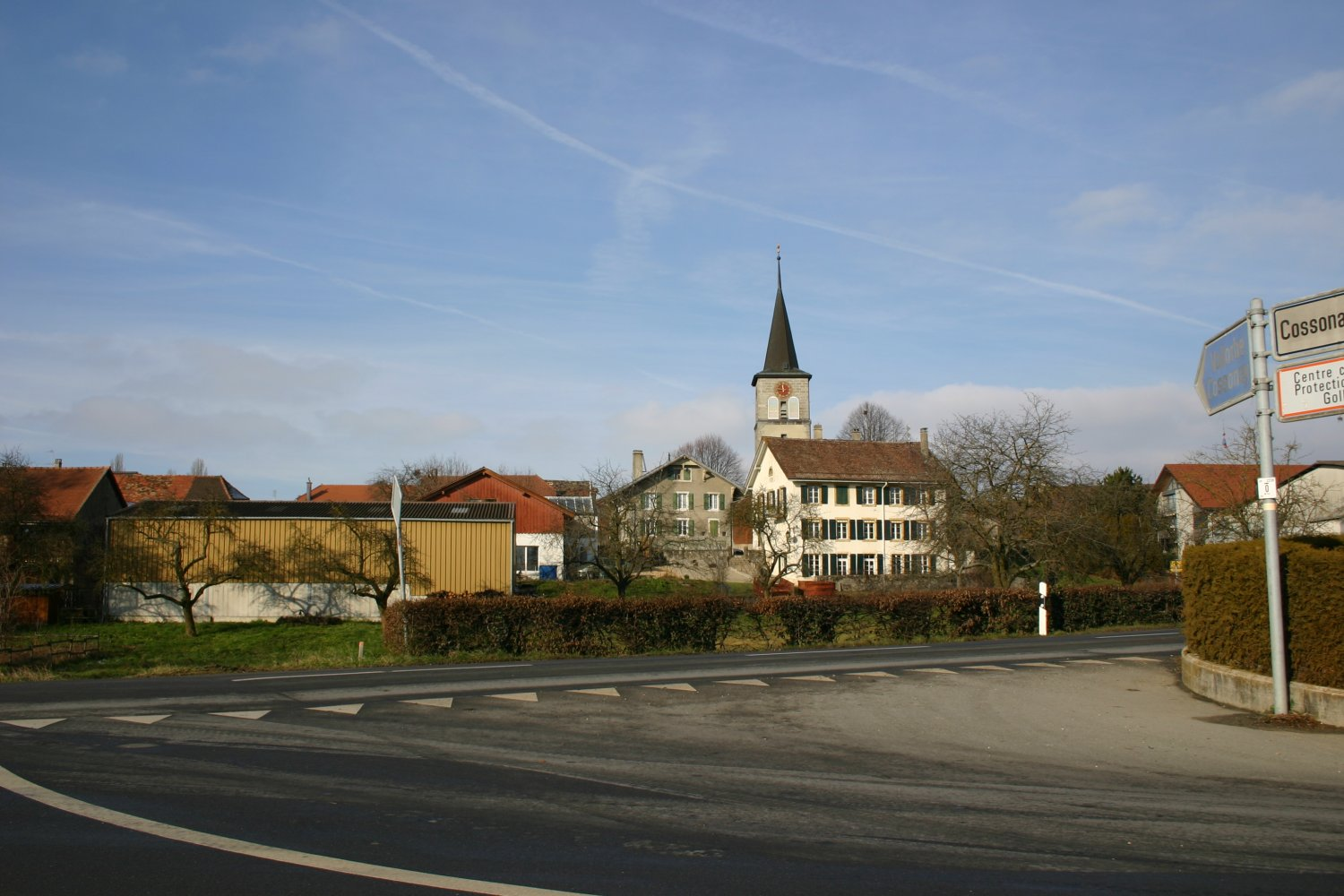
- Gollion village

- Flag Coat of arms
- Location of Gollion
- Location within Switzerland Location within Canton of Vaud
- Coordinates: 46°35′N 6°31′E
- Country: Switzerland
- Canton: Vaud
- District: Morges

Government
  - Mayor: Syndic

Area
  - Total: 5.44 km^{2} (2.10 sq mi)
- Elevation: 506 m (1,660 ft)

Population (2023-12-31)
  - Total: 1,073
  - Density: 197/km^{2} (511/sq mi)
- Time zone: UTC+01:00 (CET)
  - Summer (DST): UTC+02:00 (CEST)
- Postal code: 1124
- SFOS number: 5484
- ISO 3166 code: CH-VD
- Surrounded by: Aclens, Cossonay, Penthalaz, Penthaz, Senarclens, Vufflens-la-Ville, Vullierens
- Website: http://www.gollion.ch Profile (in French), SFSO statistics

Gollion is a municipality of the canton of Vaud in Switzerland, located in the district of Morges.

== History ==
Gollion is first mentioned in 1228 as Gollun.

== Geography ==
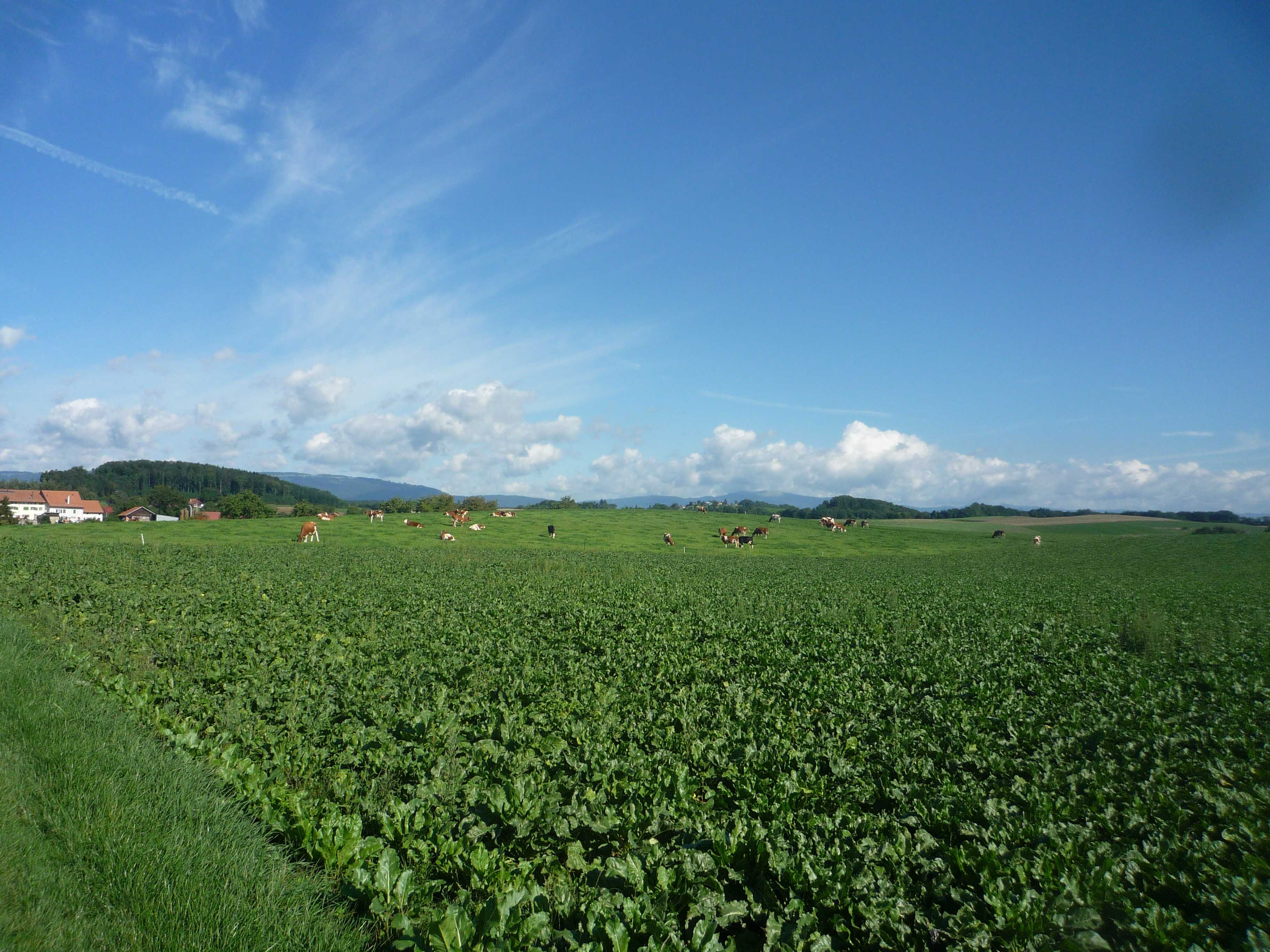
Fields outside Gollion

Aerial view (1949)

Gollion has an area, as of 2009, of 5.44 square kilometers (2.10 sq mi). Of this area, 4.39 km^{2} (1.69 sq mi) or 80.7% is used for agricultural purposes, while 0.61 km^{2} (0.24 sq mi) or 11.2% is forested. Of the rest of the land, 0.45 km^{2} (0.17 sq mi) or 8.3% is settled (buildings or roads), 0.01 km^{2} (2.5 acres) or 0.2% is either rivers or lakes.

Of the built up area, housing and buildings made up 4.4% and transportation infrastructure made up 3.3%. Out of the forested land, all of the forested land area is covered with heavy forests. Of the agricultural land, 64.7% is used for growing crops and 13.1% is pastures, while 2.9% is used for orchards or vine crops. All the water in the municipality is flowing water.

The municipality was part of the Cossonay District until it was dissolved on 31 August 2006, and Gollion became part of the new district of Morges.

The municipality is located on a plateau above the Venoge river.

== Coat of arms ==
The blazon of the municipal coat of arms is Vert, three Buckles two and one Argent.

== Demographics ==
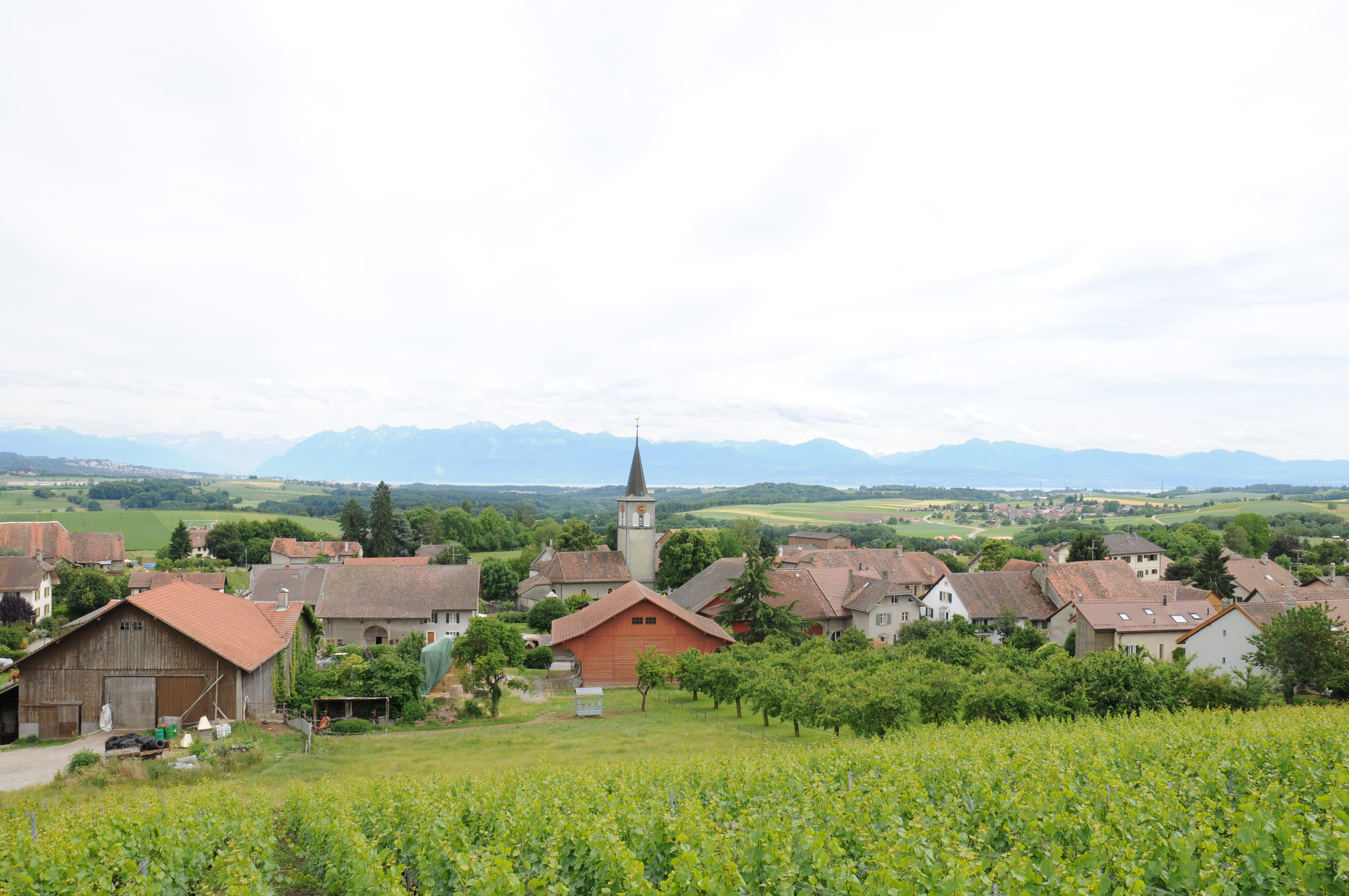
Gollion village

Gollion has a population (as of December 2020) of 997. As of 2008, 15.5% of the population are resident foreign nationals. Over the last 10 years (1999–2009 ) the population has changed at a rate of 9.7%. It has changed at a rate of 4.1% due to migration and at a rate of 5.7% due to births and deaths.

Most of the population (as of 2000) speaks French (510 or 90.3%), with German being second most common (24 or 4.2%) and Portuguese being third (11 or 1.9%). There are 5 people who speak Italian.

Of the population in the municipality 153 or about 27.1% were born in Gollion and lived there in 2000. There were 248 or 43.9% who were born in the same canton, while 75 or 13.3% were born somewhere else in Switzerland, and 79 or 14.0% were born outside of Switzerland.

In 2008 there were 5 live births to Swiss citizens and were 4 deaths of Swiss citizens. Ignoring immigration and emigration, the population of Swiss citizens increased by 1 while the foreign population remained the same. There were 2 Swiss men and 2 Swiss women who immigrated back to Switzerland. At the same time, there were 3 non-Swiss men and 4 non-Swiss women who immigrated from another country to Switzerland. The total Swiss population change in 2008 (from all sources, including moves across municipal borders) was a decrease of 4 and the non-Swiss population decreased by 4 people. This represents a population growth rate of -1.3%.

The age distribution, as of 2009, in Gollion is; 65 children or 10.5% of the population are between 0 and 9 years old and 75 teenagers or 12.1% are between 10 and 19. Of the adult population, 68 people or 11.0% of the population are between 20 and 29 years old. 86 people or 13.9% are between 30 and 39, 126 people or 20.3% are between 40 and 49, and 90 people or 14.5% are between 50 and 59. The senior population distribution is 60 people or 9.7% of the population are between 60 and 69 years old, 33 people or 5.3% are between 70 and 79, there are 14 people or 2.3% who are between 80 and 89, and there are 3 people or 0.5% who are 90 and older.

As of 2000, there were 212 people who were single and never married in the municipality. There were 299 married individuals, 22 widows or widowers and 32 individuals who are divorced.

As of 2000, there were 228 private households in the municipality, and an average of 2.5 persons per household. There were 62 households that consist of only one person and 13 households with five or more people. Out of a total of 230 households that answered this question, 27.0% were households made up of just one person. Of the rest of the households, there are 68 married couples without children, 90 married couples with children There were 6 single parents with a child or children. There were 2 households that were made up of unrelated people and 2 households that were made up of some sort of institution or another collective housing.

In 2000 there were 66 single family homes (or 46.8% of the total) out of a total of 141 inhabited buildings. There were 37 multi-family buildings (26.2%), along with 30 multi-purpose buildings that were mostly used for housing (21.3%) and 8 other use buildings (commercial or industrial) that also had some housing (5.7%). Of the single family homes 28 were built before 1919, while 5 were built between 1990 and 2000. The most multi-family homes (21) were built before 1919 and the next most (6) were built between 1991 and 1995. There were 2 multi-family houses built between 1996 and 2000.

In 2000 there were 239 apartments in the municipality. The most common apartment size was 4 rooms of which there were 84. There were 5 single room apartments and 72 apartments with five or more rooms. Of these apartments, a total of 221 apartments (92.5% of the total) were permanently occupied, while 15 apartments (6.3%) were seasonally occupied and 3 apartments (1.3%) were empty. As of 2009, the construction rate of new housing units was 1.6 new units per 1000 residents. The vacancy rate for the municipality, in 2010, was 0.74%.

The historical population is given in the following chart:

== Politics ==
In the 2007 federal election the most popular party was the SVP which received 26.06% of the vote. The next three most popular parties were the SP (20.11%), the FDP (18.49%) and the Green Party (11.34%). In the federal election, a total of 190 votes were cast, and the voter turnout was 46.9%.

== Economy ==
As of 2010, Gollion had an unemployment rate of 3.2%. As of 2008, there were 54 people employed in the primary economic sector and about 17 businesses involved in this sector. 40 people were employed in the secondary sector and there were 8 businesses in this sector. 133 people were employed in the tertiary sector, with 15 businesses in this sector. There were 300 residents of the municipality who were employed in some capacity, of which females made up 41.7% of the workforce.

In 2008 the total number of full-time equivalent jobs was 188. The number of jobs in the primary sector was 41, all of which were in agriculture. The number of jobs in the secondary sector was 35 of which 11 or (31.4%) were in manufacturing and 23 (65.7%) were in construction. The number of jobs in the tertiary sector was 112. In the tertiary sector; 10 or 8.9% were in wholesale or retail sales or the repair of motor vehicles, 9 or 8.0% were in a hotel or restaurant, 6 or 5.4% were in the information industry, 37 or 33.0% were technical professionals or scientists, 3 or 2.7% were in education.

In 2000, there were 141 workers who commuted into the municipality and 219 workers who commuted away. The municipality is a net exporter of workers, with about 1.6 workers leaving the municipality for every one entering. Of the working population, 8.3% used public transportation to get to work, and 64.3% used a private car.

== Religion ==
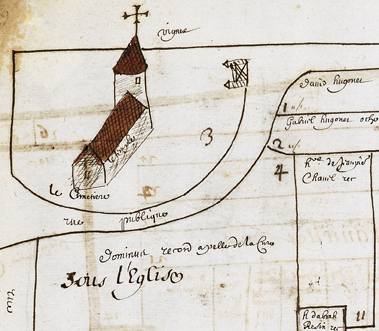
Sketch of the church and surroundings in 1690

From the 2000 census, 121 or 21.4% were Roman Catholic, while 327 or 57.9% belonged to the Swiss Reformed Church. Of the rest of the population, there were 6 members of an Orthodox church (or about 1.06% of the population), and there were 18 individuals (or about 3.19% of the population) who belonged to another Christian church. There were 3 individuals (or about 0.53% of the population) who were Jewish, and 7 (or about 1.24% of the population) who were Islamic. There was 1 person who was Hindu. 76 (or about 13.45% of the population) belonged to no church, are agnostic or atheist, and 13 individuals (or about 2.30% of the population) did not answer the question.

== Education ==
In Gollion about 218 or (38.6%) of the population have completed non-mandatory upper secondary education, and 95 or (16.8%) have completed additional higher education (either university or a Fachhochschule). Of the 95 who completed tertiary schooling, 55.8% were Swiss men, 28.4% were Swiss women, 9.5% were non-Swiss men and 6.3% were non-Swiss women.

In the 2009/2010 school year there were a total of 70 students in the Gollion school district. In the Vaud cantonal school system, two years of non-obligatory pre-school are provided by the political districts. During the school year, the political district provided pre-school care for a total of 631 children of which 203 children (32.2%) received subsidized pre-school care. The canton's primary school program requires students to attend for four years. There were 26 students in the municipal primary school program. The obligatory lower secondary school program lasts for six years and there were 44 students in those schools.

As of 2000, there were 8 students in Gollion who came from another municipality, while 98 residents attended schools outside the municipality.
