= Daillens =

- Municipality
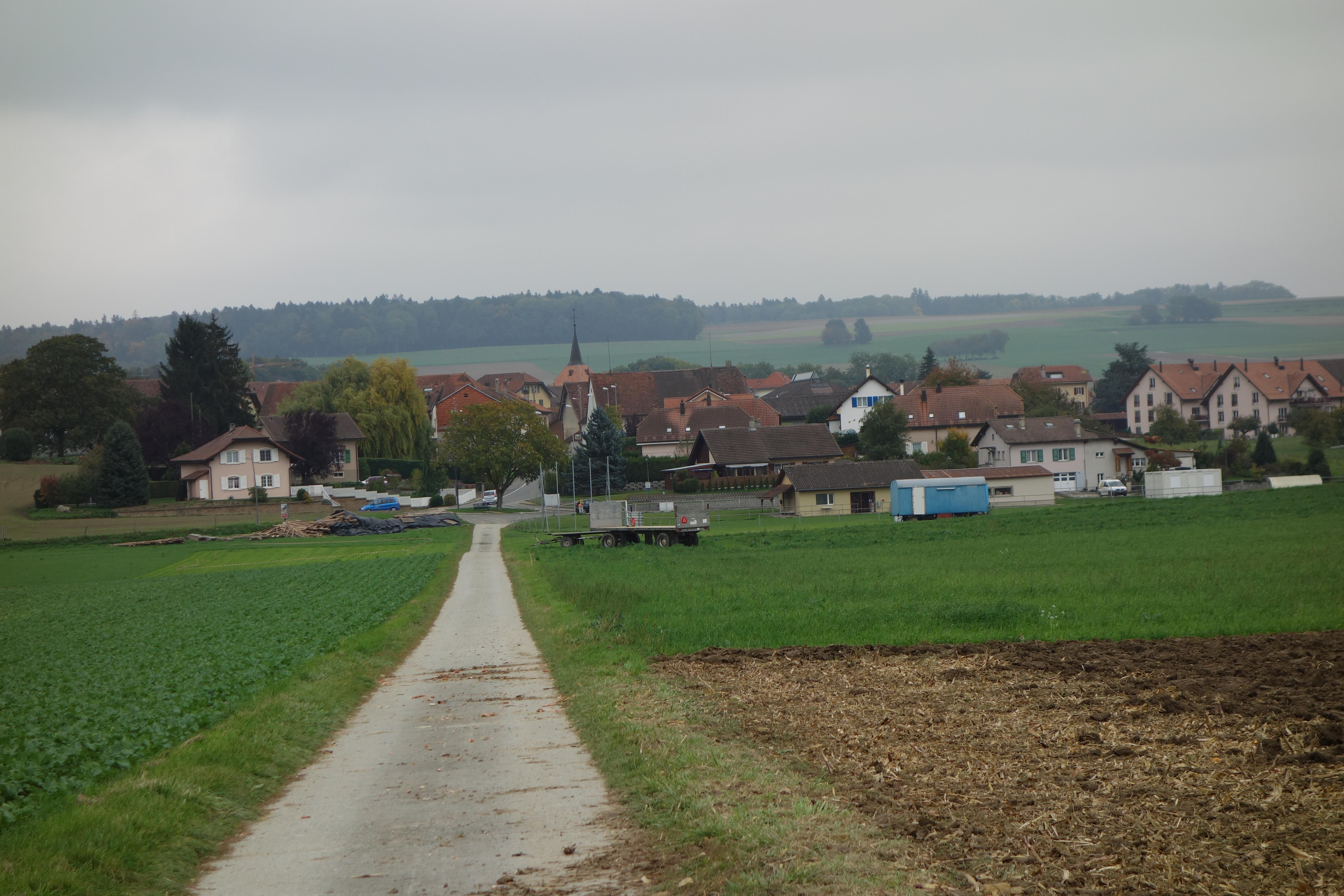
- Partial view of Daillens

- Flag Coat of arms
- Location of Daillens
- Location within Switzerland Location within Canton of Vaud
- Coordinates: 46°37′N 06°33′E
- Country: Switzerland
- Canton: Vaud
- District: Gros-de-Vaud

Government
  - Mayor: Syndic; Alberto Mocci

Area
  - Total: 5.52 km^{2} (2.13 sq mi)
- Elevation: 503 m (1,650 ft)

Population (2003)
  - Total: 634
  - Density: 115/km^{2} (297/sq mi)
- Time zone: UTC+01:00 (CET)
  - Summer (DST): UTC+02:00 (CEST)
- Postal code: 1306
- SFOS number: 5480
- ISO 3166 code: CH-VD
- Surrounded by: Bettens, Bournens, Éclépens, Lussery-Villars, Oulens-sous-Échallens, Penthalaz
- Website: www.daillens.ch

Daillens is a municipality of the canton of Vaud in Switzerland, located in the district of Gros-de-Vaud.

== History ==
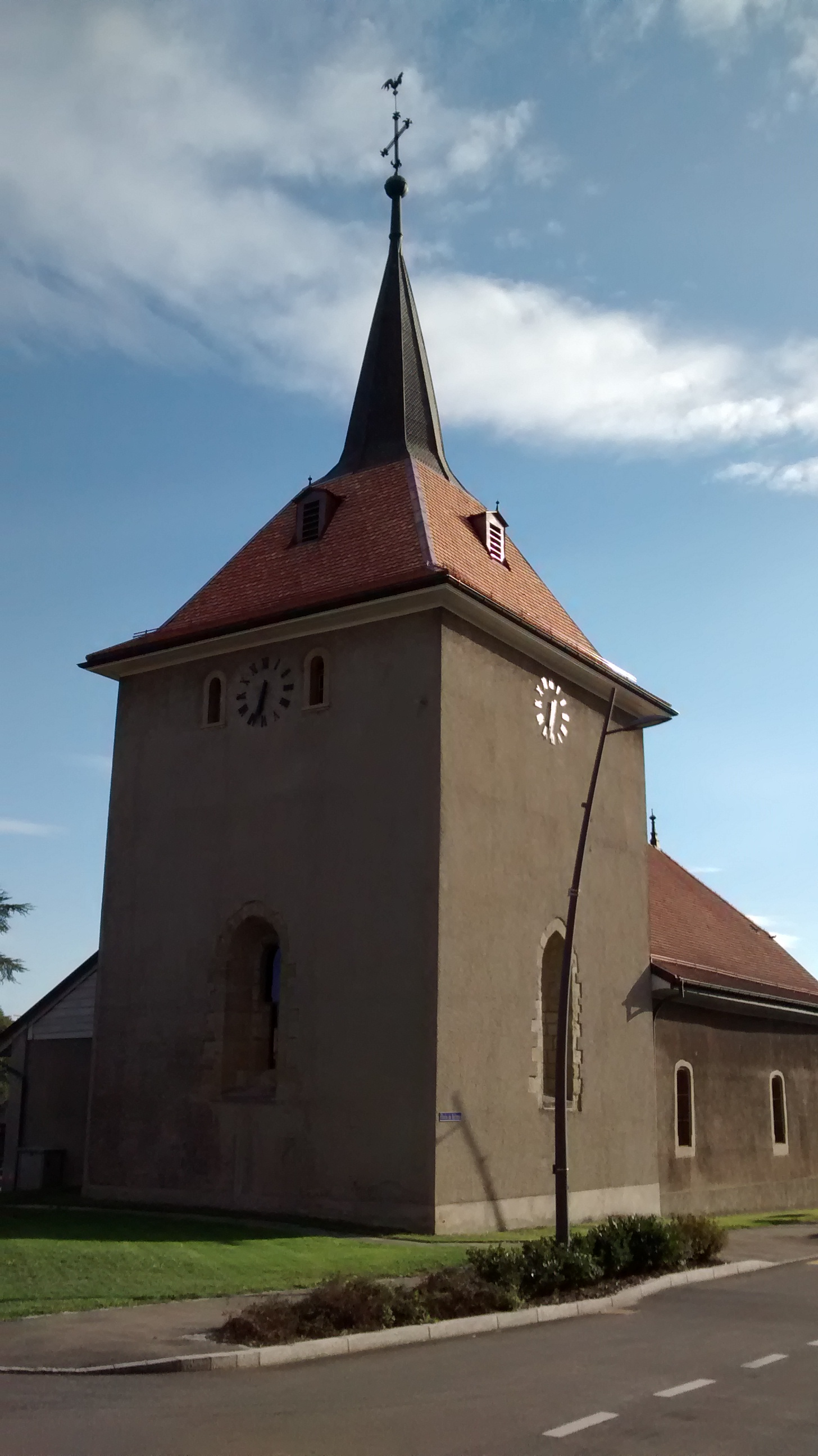
Protestant church in Daillens

Daillens is first mentioned in 1109 as Dallens.

== Geography ==
Daillens has an area, as of 2009, of 5.52 square kilometers (2.13 sq mi). Of this area, 3.59 km^{2} (1.39 sq mi) or 65.0% is used for agricultural purposes, while 1.1 km^{2} (0.42 sq mi) or 19.9% is forested. Of the rest of the land, 0.79 km^{2} (0.31 sq mi) or 14.3% is settled (buildings or roads), 0.01 km^{2} (2.5 acres) or 0.2% is either rivers or lakes.

Of the built up area, industrial buildings made up 2.7% of the total area while housing and buildings made up 4.2% and transportation infrastructure made up 5.3%. Power and water infrastructure as well as other special developed areas made up 2.0% of the area Out of the forested land, 17.4% of the total land area is heavily forested and 2.5% is covered with orchards or small clusters of trees. Of the agricultural land, 50.9% is used for growing crops and 13.2% is pastures. All the water in the municipality is flowing water.

The municipality was part of the Cossonay District until it was dissolved on 31 August 2006, and Daillens became part of the new district of Gros-de-Vaud.

== Coat of arms ==
The blazon of the municipal coat of arms is Azure, three Lozenges voided two and one Argent.

== Demographics ==
Daillens has a population (as of December 2020) of 1,051. As of 2008, 14.6% of the population are resident foreign nationals. Over the last 10 years (1999–2009) the population has changed at a rate of 47.3%. It has changed at a rate of 37.8% due to migration and at a rate of 9.7% due to births and deaths.

Most of the population (as of 2000) speaks French (568 or 95.0%), with German being second most common (16 or 2.7%) and Italian being third (5 or 0.8%).

Of the population in the municipality 166 or about 27.8% were born in Daillens and lived there in 2000. There were 246 or 41.1% who were born in the same canton, while 86 or 14.4% were born somewhere else in Switzerland, and 84 or 14.0% were born outside of Switzerland.

In 2008 there were 6 live births to Swiss citizens and 1 birth to non-Swiss citizens, and in same time span there were 5 deaths of Swiss citizens. Ignoring immigration and emigration, the population of Swiss citizens increased by 1 while the foreign population increased by 1. There were 4 Swiss men and 2 Swiss women who emigrated from Switzerland. At the same time, there were 7 non-Swiss men and 1 non-Swiss woman who immigrated from another country to Switzerland. The total Swiss population change in 2008 (from all sources, including moves across municipal borders) was an increase of 23 and the non-Swiss population increased by 33 people. This represents a population growth rate of 7.4%.

The age distribution, as of 2009, in Daillens is; 114 children or 13.5% of the population are between 0 and 9 years old and 94 teenagers or 11.1% are between 10 and 19. Of the adult population, 81 people or 9.6% of the population are between 20 and 29 years old. 159 people or 18.8% are between 30 and 39, 146 people or 17.3% are between 40 and 49, and 130 people or 15.4% are between 50 and 59. The senior population distribution is 66 people or 7.8% of the population are between 60 and 69 years old, 32 people or 3.8% are between 70 and 79, there are 20 people or 2.4% who are between 80 and 89, and there are 4 people or 0.5% who are 90 and older.

As of 2000, there were 251 people who were single and never married in the municipality. There were 310 married individuals, 16 widows or widowers and 21 individuals who are divorced.

As of 2000, there were 233 private households in the municipality, and an average of 2.5 persons per household. There were 51 households that consist of only one person and 16 households with five or more people. Out of a total of 241 households that answered this question, 21.2% were households made up of just one person and there were 2 adults who lived with their parents. Of the rest of the households, there are 70 married couples without children, 84 married couples with children There were 20 single parents with a child or children. There were 6 households that were made up of unrelated people and 8 households that were made up of some sort of institution or another collective housing.

In 2000 there were 91 single family homes (or 55.5% of the total) out of a total of 164 inhabited buildings. There were 26 multi-family buildings (15.9%), along with 40 multi-purpose buildings that were mostly used for housing (24.4%) and 7 other use buildings (commercial or industrial) that also had some housing (4.3%). Of the single family homes 27 were built before 1919, while 17 were built between 1990 and 2000. The most multi-family homes (13) were built before 1919 and the next most (5) were built between 1981 and 1990. There was 1 multi-family house built between 1996 and 2000.

In 2000 there were 245 apartments in the municipality. The most common apartment size was 4 rooms of which there were 78. There were 7 single room apartments and 93 apartments with five or more rooms. Of these apartments, a total of 212 apartments (86.5% of the total) were permanently occupied, while 27 apartments (11.0%) were seasonally occupied and 6 apartments (2.4%) were empty. As of 2009, the construction rate of new housing units was 44.7 new units per 1000 residents. The vacancy rate for the municipality, in 2010, was 1.35%.

The historical population is given in the following chart:

== Heritage sites of national significance ==
The Clocher Du Temple is listed as a Swiss heritage site of national significance.

== Politics ==
In the 2007 federal election the most popular party was the SVP which received 25.31% of the vote. The next three most popular parties were the FDP (21.36%), the SP (19.27%) and the Green Party (16.73%). In the federal election, a total of 251 votes were cast, and the voter turnout was 49.9%.

== Economy ==
Daillens has a post office, a paper factory, a sawmill and several other trades.

As of 2010, Daillens had an unemployment rate of 3.6%. As of 2008, there were 39 people employed in the primary economic sector and about 16 businesses involved in this sector. 48 people were employed in the secondary sector and there were 9 businesses in this sector. 592 people were employed in the tertiary sector, with 28 businesses in this sector. There were 318 residents of the municipality who were employed in some capacity, of which females made up 41.5% of the workforce.

In 2008 the total number of full-time equivalent jobs was 625. The number of jobs in the primary sector was 25, all of which were in agriculture. The number of jobs in the secondary sector was 45 of which 41 or (91.1%) were in manufacturing and 4 (8.9%) were in construction. The number of jobs in the tertiary sector was 555. In the tertiary sector; 44 or 7.9% were in wholesale or retail sales or the repair of motor vehicles, 493 or 88.8% were in the movement and storage of goods, 4 or 0.7% were in a hotel or restaurant, 1 was in the information industry, 2 or 0.4% were technical professionals or scientists, 5 or 0.9% were in education.

In 2000, there were 694 workers who commuted into the municipality and 231 workers who commuted away. The municipality is a net importer of workers, with about 3.0 workers entering the municipality for every one leaving. Of the working population, 7.9% used public transportation to get to work, and 67.9% used a private car.

== Religion ==
From the 2000 census, 161 or 26.9% were Roman Catholic, while 348 or 58.2% belonged to the Swiss Reformed Church. Of the rest of the population, there were 3 members of an Orthodox church (or about 0.50% of the population), and there were 12 individuals (or about 2.01% of the population) who belonged to another Christian church. There was 1 individual who was Islamic. 66 (or about 11.04% of the population) belonged to no church, are agnostic or atheist, and 13 individuals (or about 2.17% of the population) did not answer the question.

== Education ==
In Daillens about 223 or (37.3%) of the population have completed non-mandatory upper secondary education, and 95 or (15.9%) have completed additional higher education (either university or a Fachhochschule). Of the 95 who completed tertiary schooling, 55.8% were Swiss men, 23.2% were Swiss women, 10.5% were non-Swiss men and 10.5% were non-Swiss women.

In the 2009/2010 school year there were a total of 114 students in the Daillens school district. In the Vaud cantonal school system, two years of non-obligatory pre-school are provided by the political districts. During the school year, the political district provided pre-school care for a total of 296 children of which 96 children (32.4%) received subsidized pre-school care. The canton's primary school program requires students to attend for four years. There were 69 students in the municipal primary school program. The obligatory lower secondary school program lasts for six years and there were 45 students in those schools.

As of 2000, there were 14 students in Daillens who came from another municipality, while 103 residents attended schools outside the municipality.

== Notable people ==
- François-Louis Cailler (1796–1852), chocolatier and entrepreneur, had origins in Daillens
- Jean Villard (1895–1982), singer, poet and entertainer, had origins in Daillens
