= Pache =

Pache is a surname. Notable people with this surname include:

- Pache Family, powerful and influential family from Morges
- Jean Pache (1626–1670), burgher, military commander and heraldist
- Charles Henry-Pache (1749–1820), Swiss pastelist manufacturer and supplier to The Royal Society
- Thomas Pache (1841–1918), prominent ocularist and businessman
- Claude Pache (born 1943), French rower
- Cristian Pache (born 1998), Dominican professional baseball outfielder
- François Pache (born 1932), Swiss figure skater
- Jean-Nicolas Pache (1746–1823), French politician
- Johannes Pache (1857–1897), German composer
- Joseph Pache (1861–1926), German-born composer and director
- Robert Pache (1897–1974), Swiss footballer
