= Pache Family =

Patrician Pache Family of Morges

Pache
- Anglo-Swiss Burgher & Patrician Family
- Etymology: Pache (Old French): 'Pact or Agreement'
- Origin: Morges, Switzerland
- Founded: 1576; 450 years ago
- Founder: Claude Pache (d. 1605)
- Titles: Burgher (title) de Morges; Seigneurs; Coseigneurs (Lords) de Bournens
- Distinctions: Bounty from Royal Society of Arts (1773); Silver Prize Medal Award at International Exhibition London, (1884)
- Traditions: Protestantism
- Motto: Dieu Y Pourvoira ("God Will Provide")

The Pache Family was a prominent Anglo-Swiss dynasty from the Canton of Vaud who held substantial properties, status, rights and seigneuries in Morges, Lausanne and the nearby municipalities of Bournens. The family provided businessmen, merchants, senior civic and military officers for over 300 years.

The family claimed to descend from the legendary Pazzi banking family, from a member who served as vice-bailiff of Vaud and magistrate in Moudon in 1354 under Count William I of Namur.

== Origins ==
Claude Pache [d. 1605], who was originally from Ferlens, and then moved to Morges, first established the families prominence and influence in the region by securing the citizenry status of bourgeoisie in 1587, in the town of Morges.

Claude was Abbé (Master) of the powerful and highly influential Guild of Shoemakers, who controlled much of the towns productional wealth during this period. Not only did the guild oversee much of the towns economy and trade, but it also functioned as a distinct brotherhood (confrérie). Notably, they had their own shooting abbey (abbaye de tir) which meant members were directly involved in the town's military defense and civic festivals. He was elected on three separate occasions to lead the guild between 1576-96.

Arms of the Pache Family in Armorial des Nobles Fusiliers ou Arquebusiers de Lausanne 1655

Sieur Jean Pache 'The Elder' (1626-1670) a descendant of Claude, was a prominent Burgher of Morges and military commander who was Captain of the district of Vullierens and of Vufflens-le-chateau in 1655. He was a member of the elite shooting guild (Noble Abbaye des Fusiliers) in Lausanne. It functioned as a prestigious patrician military and social fraternity responsible for the defense and civic leadership, being highly influential under the Bernese administration. It's membership reserved for the noble and bourgeoisie elite families of the region.

Jean was also a zealous heraldist, to whom we owe several collections of coat of arms in the region, most importantly the Armorial du Pays de Vaud (also known as 'The Pache Armorial') written in 1654, and dedicated to Johann Ludwig von Erlach.

After the death of Jean Pache, the family began to split into three parallel branches:

• The Magisterial Branch : Led by Jean-Paul and Isaye Pache. This branch included court officials and leading officers, and had a 75 year monopoly as Bailiwick secretaries and senior court officials.

• The Seignorial Branch : Led by David Pache and after his death his son Gamaliel who inherited the lordship (Coseigneur) of Bournens including fiefs, rights, and land tenures.

• The Mercantile Branch : Led by Jean-Louis and his brother Jacob. This branch prioritised skilled trades, commerce and artistry. Leading to a migration over to London to establish and cultivate trade.

== Notable members from the Swiss branch ==
- Isaye Pache (d. 1665) - Consistorial Councillor (Elder) and Elected Master (Abbe') of the Guild of Shoemakers in 1646.
- Pierre Pache - Burgher, Magistrate, "Councillor of justice", received 2 June 1662.

Honorable bourgeois Pierre Pache's personal coat of arms

- Jean-Paul Pache (1660-1736) - Magistrate and Bailli Secretary (Secretaire d'un Bailliage)
- Louis Pache (d.1771) - Bailli Secretary (Secretaire d'un Bailliage)
- Jean-François-Louis Pache (1736-1809) - Bailli Secretary (Secretaire d'un Bailliage)
- Louis-Gamaliel Pache (1681-1751) - Magistrate
- Pierre-Louis Pache (1738-1797) - Magistrate
- David Pache (1680–1760) - Coseigneur (Lord) of Bournens in 1735 after inheriting fiefs, rights, and land tenures (cens) in the area from his sister, Catherine Baudelle.
- Gamaliel Pache (1740–1817): He inherited the Lordship from his father David in 1760. He held these seigneurial rights over Bournens until the system was permanently dismantled during the Swiss (Vaudois) Revolution of 1798.
- Samuel Pache (1785-1869) - Syndic (Mayor) of Morges between 1837-1845 and 1847-1862.
- Alexis-Auguste Pache (1872-1905) - Cavalry Lieutenant who participated in the Boer War and died in an avalanche during an expedition in the Himalayas.

== English branch ==
During the 18th century, there was a distinct migration from the Morges region. This was primarily due to Swiss pastel exports. Jean-Louis Pache and his nephews Francis and Charles Henry-Pache ran a successful Haberdashery and Swiss pastel business, importing pastels into England and eventually securing a significant bounty from the Society for the Encouragement of Arts, Manufactures and Commerce (Royal Society of Arts) for establishing the manufacture of high-end Swiss-style artists' pastels. The bounty amount was 20 guineas in order to help further secure the manufacturing of these quality pastels in England.

Pache Swiss Crayons 1774

Due to this, multiple family members then proceeded to emigrate to London, and this established the English branch of the family.

This branch of the family went on to produce skilled businessmen for nearly 200 years. Most notably skilled Glassblowing and leading master Artificial Eye Makers. Pache & Son, a prize winning family business, supplied artificial glass eyes to all major UK hospitals.

Pache & Son 1893

== Notable people from the English branch ==
- Jean-Louis (Lewis) Pache (1727-1773) - Merchant, Haberdasher, Swiss crayon vendor and Elder of the Swiss Church in London.
- Charles Henry-Pache (1749–1820) - Swiss Pastelist manufacturer and supplier to the Royal Society.
- Francis Lewis Pache (1733-1786) - Glover supplying the British Aristocracy in Soho,London
- Charles Pache (1775-1849) - Seal carving and Intaglio (printmaking) business in Bristol.
- Charles Lewis Pache (1814-1885) - Founder of Pache & Son, Artificial Glass Eye Maker and General Glass Worker.
- Thomas Pache (1841-1918) - Wealthy businessman, prominent Ocularist and owner of the award winning family firm Pache & Son.
- Frederick Louis Pache (1871-1910) - Ocularist and heir to the Pache & Son family business.
Charles Pache (1775-1849)

Charles Lewis Pache business advertisement circa 1853

Pache & Son

Thomas Pache

Frederick Louis Pache
