= Thomas Pache =

English Ocularist and Manufacturer (1841–1918)

- Thomas Pache 1841–1918
- Born: 10 June 1841; Birmingham, England
- Died: 13 December 1918 (aged 77); Birmingham, West Midlands, England
- Occupations: Artificial Glass Eye Maker, Manufacturer
- Known for: Artificial Glass Eyes; Snellen's "Reformed Eye" using English glass
- Relatives: Charles Henry-Pache (great-granduncle); Jean-Louis (Lewis) Pache (great-great-granduncle); Jean Pache (Ancestor)
- Awards: Silver Prize Medal Award at International Exhibition, London, 1884

Thomas Pache (10 June 1841 – 13 December 1918) was a prominent Ocularist and owner of the family firm Pache & Son, which provided major UK hospitals with artificial glass eyes as well as the perfected Snellen "Reformed Eye".

== Early life ==
Born in Birmingham and of Swiss-Huguenot ancestry, Thomas descended from the powerful and highly influential Pache Family from Morges in the Canton of Vaud, Switzerland, which has ancestral records dating back centuries involving local artisans, merchants, and businessmen. He was also the great-great-nephew of the famed Swiss Pastellist and supplier to the Royal Society of Arts, Charles Henry-Pache

He was the second eldest of eight children to Charles Lewis Pache (1814–1885) and Frances Pache (1818–1890). His father was also a master artificial eye maker, who having seen French glass eyes at the Great Exhibition of 1851 went on to make superior glass eyes that were much cheaper. His firm operated in Hurst Street, Birmingham.

Charles Pache

Thomas was also the grandson of Charles Pache Senior (1766–1849), who was an Engraver and Copper Plate Printer, running a business in the old quay area of Bristol.

Charles Lewis Pache business advertisement circa 1853

He first joined his father's business in 1871 which was under the name C Pache & Son, specialising in Artificial Glass Eyes, as well as Syringes, test tubes, foreign bird skins and insects.

== Pache & Son ==
It was in the late 1870s when the firm was eventually handed over to Thomas, as noted in the London Gazette on June 3, 1879: NOTICE is hereby given, that the Partnership heretofore subsisting between us the undersigned, Charles Pache and Thomas Pache, trading as C. Pache and Son of No. 171 Bristol-street, Birmingham, in the county of Warwick, Artificial Eye Manufacturers, is dissolved by mutual consent. The said Thomas Pache will continue the business and receive and pay all debts due and owing to and from the said firm.

The Pache Family

It was during the 1890s that the family firm had consolidated its position as one of the countries leading artificial glass eye makers, and by 1900 was providing them to all major hospitals in the UK. It was also providing naturalist supplies, particularly to taxidermists, which required the studying of a range of animal eyes to replicate perfectly in glass form.

By this time, the firm would have upwards of 4,000 eyes in stock and ready to be delivered to hospitals at any one time. They created glass eyes in various colours, sizes, and morbid conditions. Due to their exquisite design and detail, they even supplied models to universities so that the various examples of diseases and conditions of the eye could be examined by the students.

Pache & Son

In the later 1890s, Thomas managed to perfect Snellen's Reformed Eye using English glass, which was notoriously harder to work with as it was lead-glass instead of the lighter soda-lime glass of which the Muller brothers used when they had originally succeeded in 1892 to blow a hollow artificial eye.

This enabled the business to profit greatly from this breakthrough, as the reformed eye was used by hospitals in the UK to treat eye injuries leading up to and during the first world war. This was because it had a hollow space between two connected glass layers instead of a thin, single shell, preventing a sunken look which in turn provided more comfort and better mobility to the user.

== Later life ==
It was in 1910 when his son and heir to the family business Frederick Louis Pache unexpectedly passed away from a short bout of Tuberculosis aged 38, leaving behind a wife and 4 children.

Thomas Pache in 1914

The unexpected death of Thomas' son and heir came as a shock to the firm, but it still carried on operating, with his daughter Ella Pache now helping in managing the business.

On 13 Dec1 1918 Thomas died of arterial atheroma in Kings Norton, Birmingham aged 77. He left a large fortune valued at £10,665 as well as numerous leaseholds and dwelling houses he owned in Birmingham, which were inherited by his daughter Ella Pache and the remaining family members.

His daughter Ella carried on the family business until sometime in the 1940s, from which it ceased to operate.
