= A Healing Art =

- Directed by: Ellen Frick
- Distributed by: P.O.V.
- Release dates: March 18, 2009 (P.O.V.); August 17, 2010 (United States)
- Running time: 7 minutes
- Country: United States
- Language: English

A Healing Art is a 2009 short documentary film from director Ellen Frick. It tells the story of two Ocularists, Christie Erickson and Todd Cranmore, who make custom prosthetic eyes. Their story is interwoven with the lives of their patients. A Healing Art was distributed by Ellen Frick and Seattle-based Fly on the Wall Films.

== Awards ==
The film premièred at the 2009 Toronto International Film Festival, where it won the POV | American Documentary Award and the 2009 Audience Award. It was featured at the Seattle Film Festival in February 2010 and had its television première on PBS's show P.O.V. on August 17, 2010.

Example of healing art can be found on http://energyhealingpainting.com
