= Puche =

Puche is a Spanish surname. Notable people with the surname include:

- Antonio Puche (born 1972), Spanish footballer and manager
- Fernando Puche (1946–2024), Spanish businessman
- Jaime Serra Puche (born 1951), Mexican economist
- Montserrat Puche Díaz (born 1970), Spanish handball player
- Miguel Puche (born 2001), Spanish footballer

== See also ==
- Pache
