= Claude Pache (Morges) =

Prominent Swiss bourgeois and guildmaster

Honorable Maître Claude Pache Bourgeoisie de Morges

Abbé des Cordonniers
- In office 1576–1577
- In office 1586–1587
- In office 1596–1597

Personal details
- Born: Ferlens, Canton of Berne
- Died: 1605 Morges, Canton of Berne,

Claude Pache was born in Ferlens, Canton of Berne sometime in the 16th century. He was the founder of the powerful and influential Pache Family of Morges. The family claimed to descend from the legendary Pazzi banking family, from a member who served as vice-bailiff of Vaud and magistrate in Moudon in 1354 under Count William I of Namur.

== Biography ==
Claude Pache [d. 1605] first established the families prominence and influence in the region by securing the citizenry status of bourgeoisie in 1587, in the town of Morges.

Claude was Abbé (Master) of the powerful and highly influential Guild of Shoemakers, who controlled much of the towns productional wealth during this period.

Arms of the Pache Family Blazon: Or and Gules, a bordure azure charged with eight bezants argent

Not only did the guild oversee much of the towns economy and trade, but it also functioned as a distinct brotherhood (confrérie). Notably, they had their own shooting abbey (abbaye de tir) which meant members were directly involved in the town's military defense and civic festivals. He was elected on three separate occasions to lead the guild between 1576-96.

== Death ==
Claude dies sometime in 1605, and by this time solidifying the families influence within the region. This dynastic influence continued for over 300 years.
