= Bournens =

- Municipality
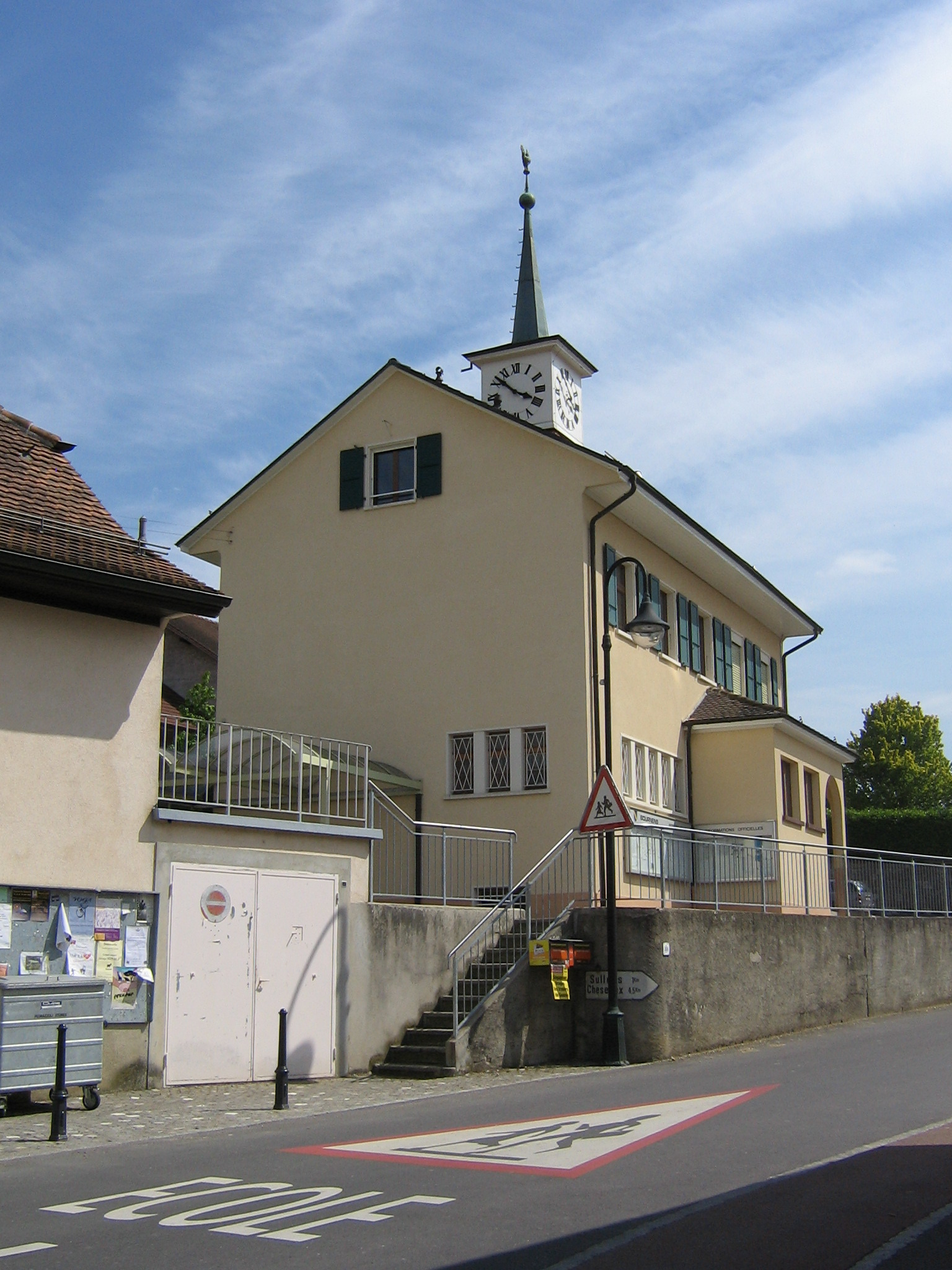

- Flag Coat of arms
- Location of Bournens
- Location within Switzerland Location within Canton of Vaud
- Coordinates: 46°36′N 06°34′E
- Country: Switzerland
- Canton: Vaud
- District: Gros-de-Vaud

Government
  - Mayor: Syndic; Claude Bocion

Area
  - Total: 3.9 km^{2} (1.5 sq mi)
- Elevation: 565 m (1,854 ft)

Population (2004)
  - Total: 254
  - Density: 65/km^{2} (170/sq mi)
- Demonym: Les Argans
- Time zone: UTC+01:00 (CET)
  - Summer (DST): UTC+02:00 (CEST)
- Postal code: 1035
- SFOS number: 5472
- ISO 3166 code: CH-VD
- Surrounded by: Bettens, Boussens, Sullens, Penthaz, Daillens
- Website: https://www.bournens.ch Profile (in French), SFSO statistics

Bournens is a municipality in the district of Gros-de-Vaud in the canton of Vaud in Switzerland.

== History ==
Bournens is first mentioned in 1184 as Brunens.

== Geography ==
Bournens has an area, as of 2009, of 3.9 square kilometers (1.5 sq mi). Of this area, 2.9 km^{2} (1.1 sq mi) or 74.4% is used for agricultural purposes, while 0.63 km^{2} (0.24 sq mi) or 16.2% is forested. Of the rest of the land, 0.29 km^{2} (0.11 sq mi) or 7.4% is settled (buildings or roads) and 0.06 km^{2} (15 acres) or 1.5% is unproductive land.

Of the built up area, housing and buildings made up 3.3% and transportation infrastructure made up 3.6%. Out of the forested land, all of the forested land area is covered with heavy forests. Of the agricultural land, 65.6% is used for growing crops and 7.4% is pastures, while 1.3% is used for orchards or vine crops.

The municipality was part of the Cossonay District until it was dissolved on 31 August 2006, and Bournens became part of the new district of Gros-de-Vaud.

== Coat of arms ==
The blazon of the municipal coat of arms is Azure, a bend Or.

== Demographics ==
Bournens has a population (as of December 2020) of 491. As of 2008, 7.2% of the population are resident foreign nationals. Over the last 10 years (1999–2009 ) the population has changed at a rate of 16%. It has changed at a rate of 10.7% due to migration and at a rate of 5.3% due to births and deaths.

Most of the population (as of 2000) speaks French (229 or 91.2%), with German being second most common (9 or 3.6%) and Serbo-Croatian being third (6 or 2.4%). There are 3 people who speak Italian.

Of the population in the municipality 69 or about 27.5% were born in Bournens and lived there in 2000. There were 99 or 39.4% who were born in the same canton, while 47 or 18.7% were born somewhere else in Switzerland, and 36 or 14.3% were born outside of Switzerland.

In 2008 there were 4 live births to Swiss citizens and 1 death of a Swiss citizen. Ignoring immigration and emigration, the population of Swiss citizens increased by 3 while the foreign population remained the same. There were 2 Swiss men who emigrated from Switzerland. The total Swiss population change in 2008 (from all sources, including moves across municipal borders) was an increase of 20 and the non-Swiss population increased by 7 people. This represents a population growth rate of 10.7%.

The age distribution, as of 2009, in Bournens is; 43 children or 15.2% of the population are between 0 and 9 years old and 25 teenagers or 8.8% are between 10 and 19. Of the adult population, 26 people or 9.2% of the population are between 20 and 29 years old. 42 people or 14.8% are between 30 and 39, 48 people or 17.0% are between 40 and 49, and 34 people or 12.0% are between 50 and 59. The senior population distribution is 36 people or 12.7% of the population are between 60 and 69 years old, 21 people or 7.4% are between 70 and 79, there are 8 people or 2.8% who are between 80 and 89.

As of 2000, there were 89 people who were single and never married in the municipality. There were 142 married individuals, 7 widows or widowers and 13 individuals who are divorced.

As of 2000, there were 105 private households in the municipality, and an average of 2.4 persons per household. There were 26 households that consist of only one person and 7 households with five or more people. Out of a total of 106 households that answered this question, 24.5% were households made up of just one person. Of the rest of the households, there are 41 married couples without children, 32 married couples with children There were 4 single parents with a child or children. There were 2 households that were made up of unrelated people and 1 household that was made up of some sort of institution or another collective housing.

In 2000 there were 57 single-family homes (or 66.3% of the total) out of a total of 86 inhabited buildings. There were 10 multi-family buildings (11.6%), along with 13 multi-purpose buildings that were mostly used for housing (15.1%) and 6 other use buildings (commercial or industrial) that also had some housing (7.0%). Of the single-family homes 12 were built before 1919, while 5 were built between 1990 and 2000. The greatest number of single-family homes (20) were built between 1981 and 1990. The most multi-family homes (4) were built between 1971 and 1980 and the next most (2) were built before 1919.

In 2000 there were 107 apartments in the municipality. The most common apartment size was 4 rooms of which there were 37. There were 3 single-room apartments and 35 apartments with five or more rooms. Of these apartments, a total of 99 apartments (92.5% of the total) were permanently occupied, while 5 apartments (4.7%) were seasonally occupied and 3 apartments (2.8%) were empty. As of 2009, the construction rate of new housing units was 3.5 new units per 1000 residents. The vacancy rate for the municipality, in 2010, was 0%.

The historical population is given in the following chart:

== Politics ==
In the 2007 federal election the most popular party was the SVP which received 26.17% of the vote. The next three most popular parties were the FDP (20.99%), the Green Party (19.74%) and the SP (12.51%). In the federal election, a total of 103 votes were cast, and the voter turnout was 53.6%.

== Economy ==
As of 2010, Bournens had an unemployment rate of 3.5%. As of 2008, there were 25 people employed in the primary economic sector and about 10 businesses involved in this sector. 4 people were employed in the secondary sector and there were 3 businesses in this sector. 14 people were employed in the tertiary sector, with 8 businesses in this sector. There were 133 residents of the municipality who were employed in some capacity, of which females made up 42.1% of the workforce.

In 2008 the total number of full-time equivalent jobs was 32. The number of jobs in the primary sector was 17, all of which were in agriculture. The number of jobs in the secondary sector was 4 of which 2 or (50.0%) were in manufacturing and 2 (50.0%) were in construction. The number of jobs in the tertiary sector was 11. In the tertiary sector; 2 or 18.2% were in wholesale or retail sales or the repair of motor vehicles, 2 or 18.2% were in a hotel or restaurant, 2 or 18.2% were in the information industry, 2 or 18.2% were technical professionals or scientists, 2 or 18.2% were in education.

In 2000, there were 4 workers who commuted into the municipality and 105 workers who commuted away. The municipality is a net exporter of workers, with about 26.3 workers leaving the municipality for every one entering. Of the working population, 5.3% used public transportation to get to work, and 71.4% used a private car.

== Religion ==
From the 2000 census, 73 or 29.1% were Roman Catholic, while 141 or 56.2% belonged to the Swiss Reformed Church. Of the rest of the population, there were 6 members of an Orthodox church (or about 2.39% of the population), and there were 3 individuals (or about 1.20% of the population) who belonged to another Christian church. 28 (or about 11.16% of the population) belonged to no church, are agnostic or atheist.

== Education ==
In Bournens about 114 or (45.4%) of the population have completed non-mandatory upper secondary education, and 45 or (17.9%) have completed additional higher education (either university or a Fachhochschule). Of the 45 who completed tertiary schooling, 51.1% were Swiss men, 37.8% were Swiss women.

In the 2009/2010 school year there were a total of 39 students in the Bournens school district. In the Vaud cantonal school system, two years of non-obligatory pre-school are provided by the political districts. During the school year, the political district provided pre-school care for a total of 296 children of which 96 children (32.4%) received subsidized pre-school care. The canton's primary school program requires students to attend for four years. There were 21 students in the municipal primary school program. The obligatory lower secondary school program lasts for six years and there were 18 students in those schools.

As of 2000, there were 23 students in Bournens who came from another municipality, while 32 residents attended schools outside the municipality.
