= Jean-Louis (Lewis) Pache =

Swiss pastelist (1749–1820)

- Born: 1727; Morges, Vaud, Switzerland
- Died: 1773 (Aged 46); City of London, England
- Occupations: Hosier, Haberdasher and Pastel Merchant
- Known for: Merchant and Elder in the early Swiss-Huguenot Church

Jean-Louis (Lewis) Pache (1727-1773) was a Swiss Hosiery, Haberdasher,Pastel Merchant and prominent Swiss-Huguenot.

== Early life ==
He was born in Morges, in the Canton of Vaud, Switzerland. Pache was of Swiss-Huguenot ancestry, part of the influential Pache Family, which included artisans and merchants who had operated around the Lausanne area since the 16th Century. He was the uncle of the prominent pastel supplier Charles Henry-Pache

== Career ==
Jean-Louis ran a business that provided service to hosiery, hatters, glover and pastel vendors. It operated in Hays Court off Gerrard Street, Soho, London between 1754-1766. Lewis' company went through various partnerships; becoming Lewis Pache in 1756, Pache & Davis in 1761, 1762 and 1764, Lewis Pache & Co in 1765 and 1766 (February).

Soho 18th Century

His pastels were made by Bernard Stoupan, imported from Lausanne, Switzerland. Lewis advertised that they had gained recommendation from pastel painter Jean Etienne Liotard.

His company provided these services to wealthy clients and members of the aristocracy, such as Lord Byron's sister Augusta Leigh.

He was naturalised in February 1755 and became a prominent member and elder of the Swiss church of Moor St. It was a spiritual home for expatriate Swiss, and became a centre of help for poor Swiss in London, playing an important role in their protection in the early part of that period.

== Death ==
Lewis died on the 11th February 1773. His will made bequests to his nephew Charles Henry-Pache, son of his brother Jacob Samuel Pache, and to other relatives. In October annuities to the sum of £300, jointly held by Lewis Pache and his partners, were re-registered in the names of the survivors.
