= Ocular prosthesis =

Type of craniofacial prosthesis

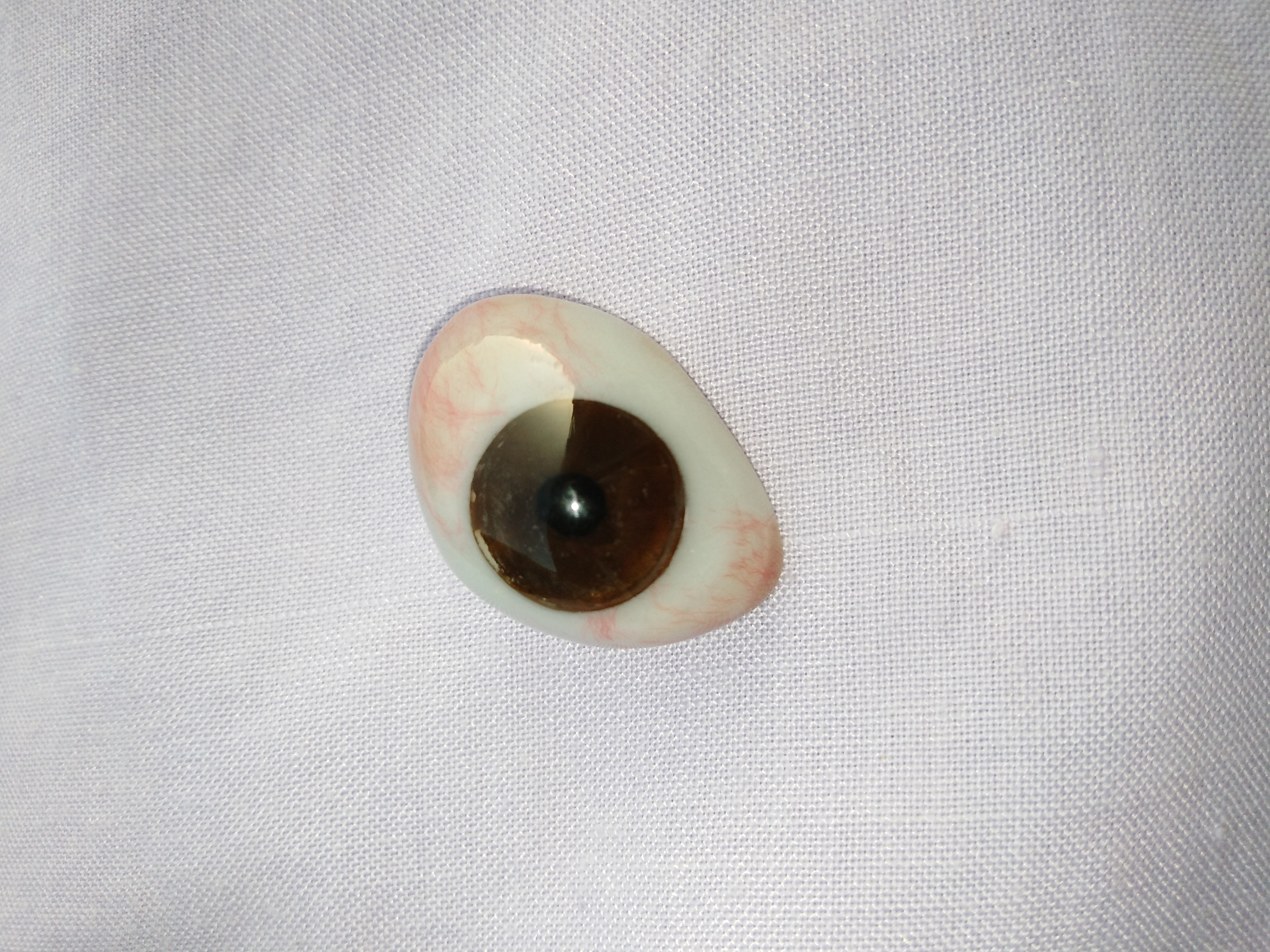
Human ocular prosthesis of brown color.

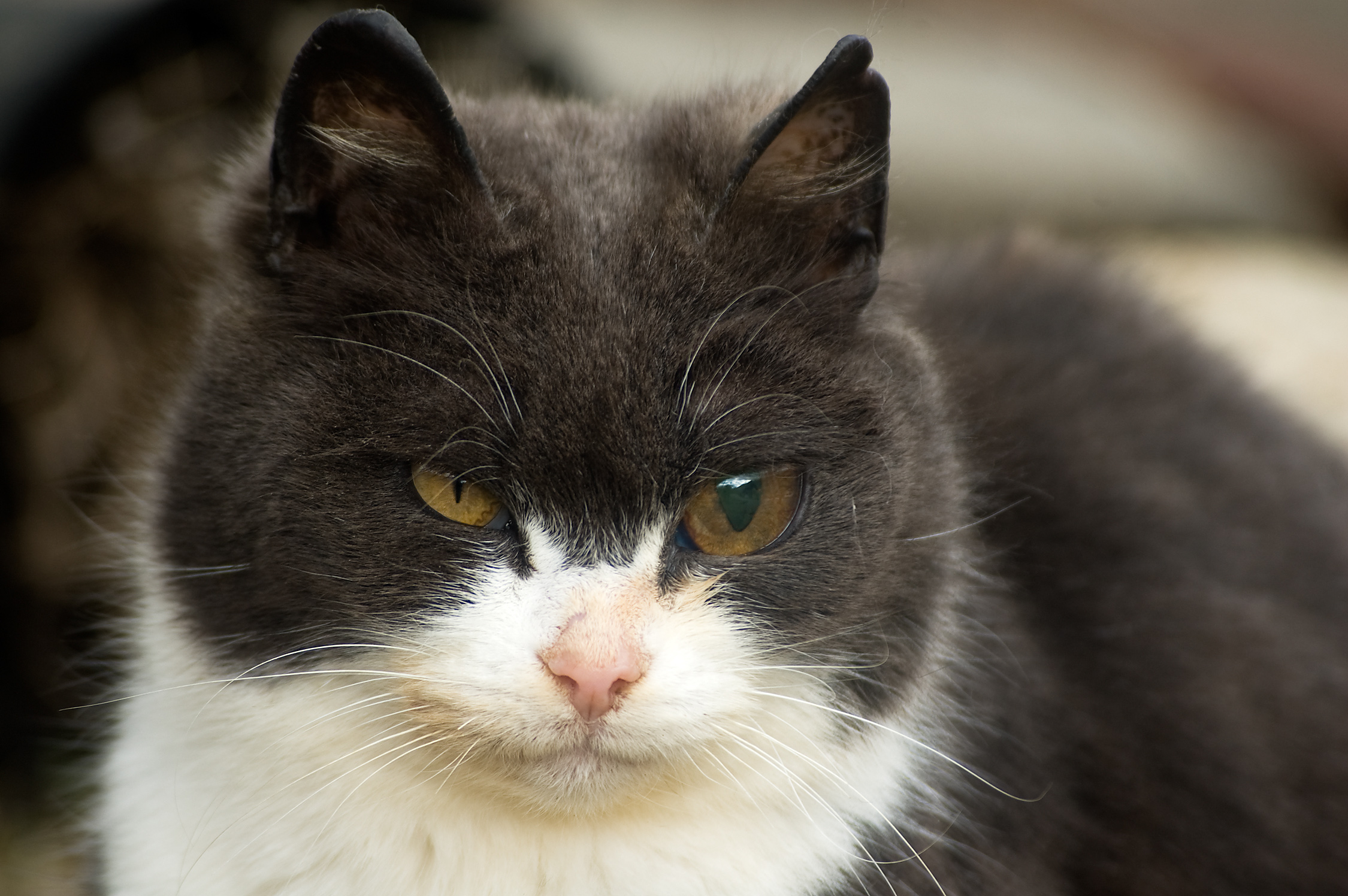
Cat with an ocular prosthesis.

An ocular prosthesis, artificial eye or glass eye is a type of craniofacial prosthesis that replaces an absent natural eye following an enucleation, evisceration, or orbital exenteration. Someone with an ocular prosthesis is altogether blind on the affected side and has monocular (one sided) vision.

The prosthesis fits over an orbital implant and under the eyelids. The ocular prosthesis roughly takes the shape of a convex shell and is made of medical grade acrylic plastic. A few ocular prostheses today are made of cryolite glass. A variant of the ocular prosthesis is a very thin hard shell known as a scleral shell which can be worn over a damaged or eviscerated eye. Makers of ocular prosthetics are known as ocularists. Ocularists are surprisingly rare: as of 2025, there were fewer than 200 certified practitioners in the United States, and only around three dozen in India.

Visual prosthesis are currently in research which could provide vision to the artificial eye.

== History ==
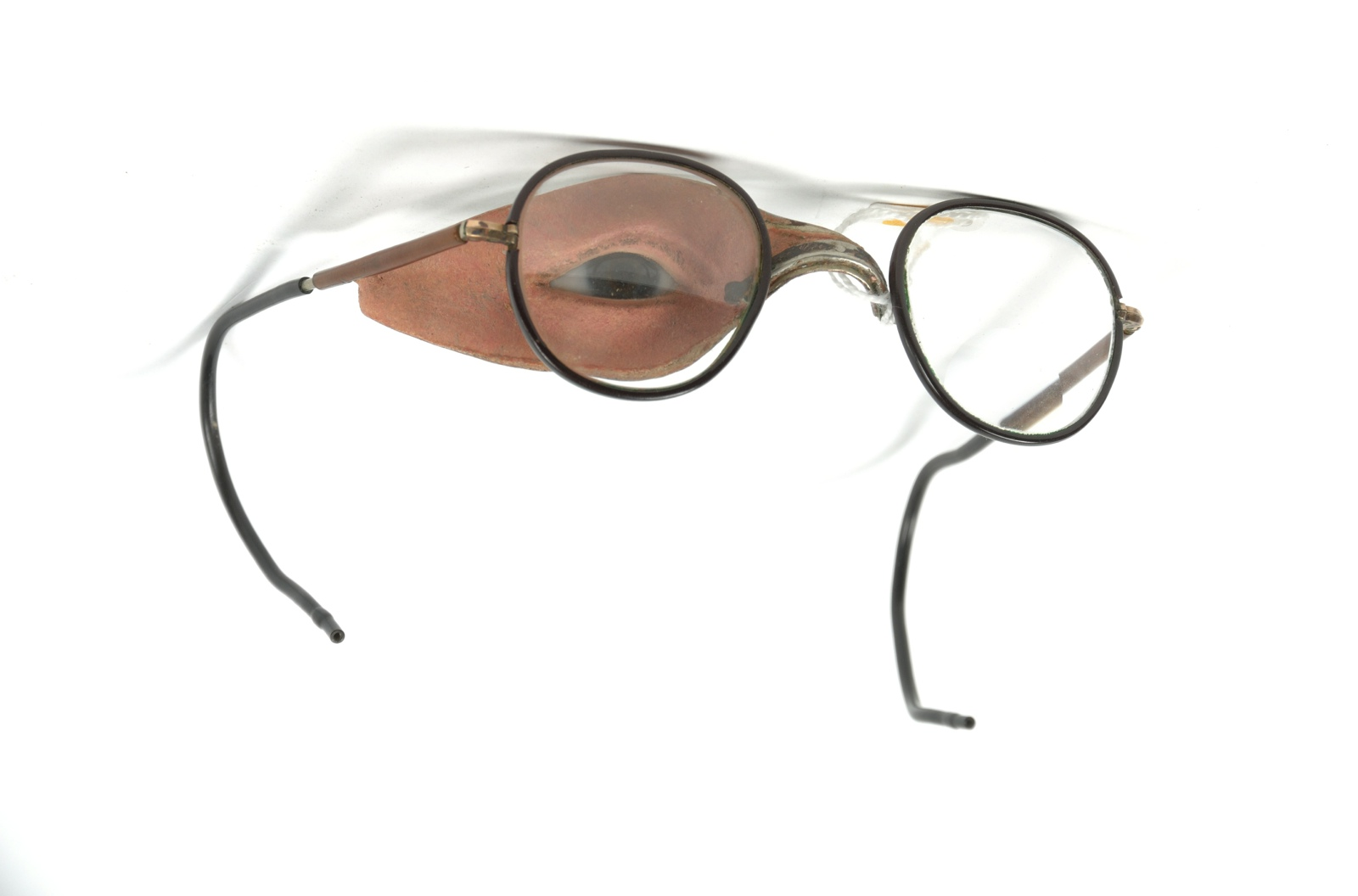
Prosthetic eye and glasses made for an injured World War I soldier by pioneering plastic surgeon Johannes Esser.

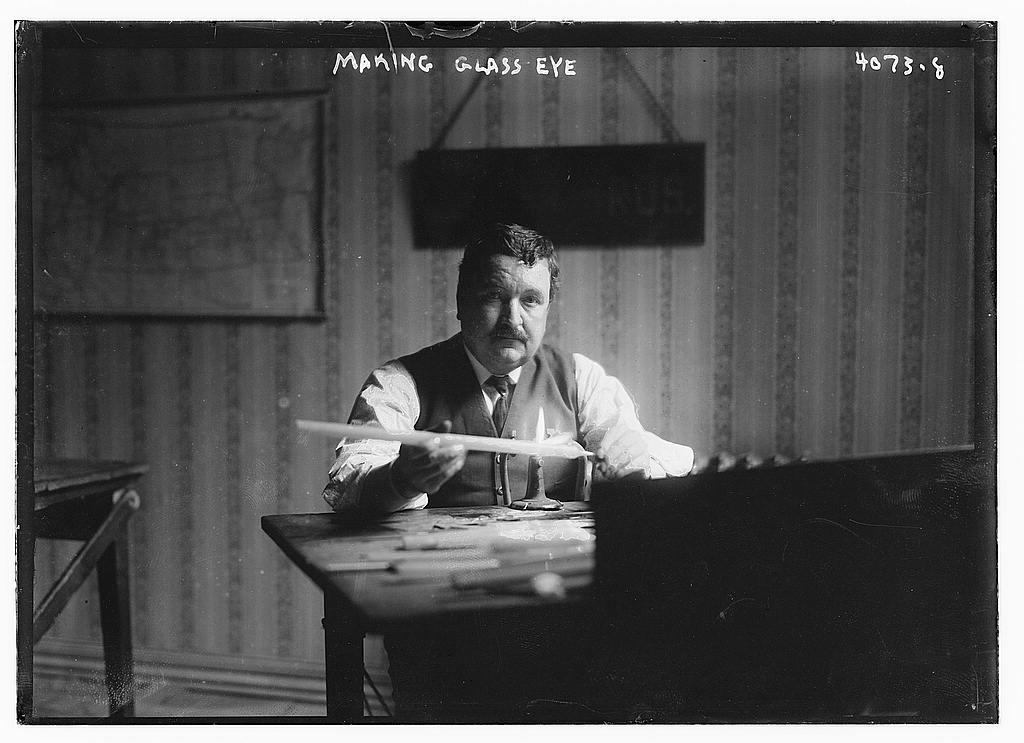
"Making glass eye", c. 1915–1920.

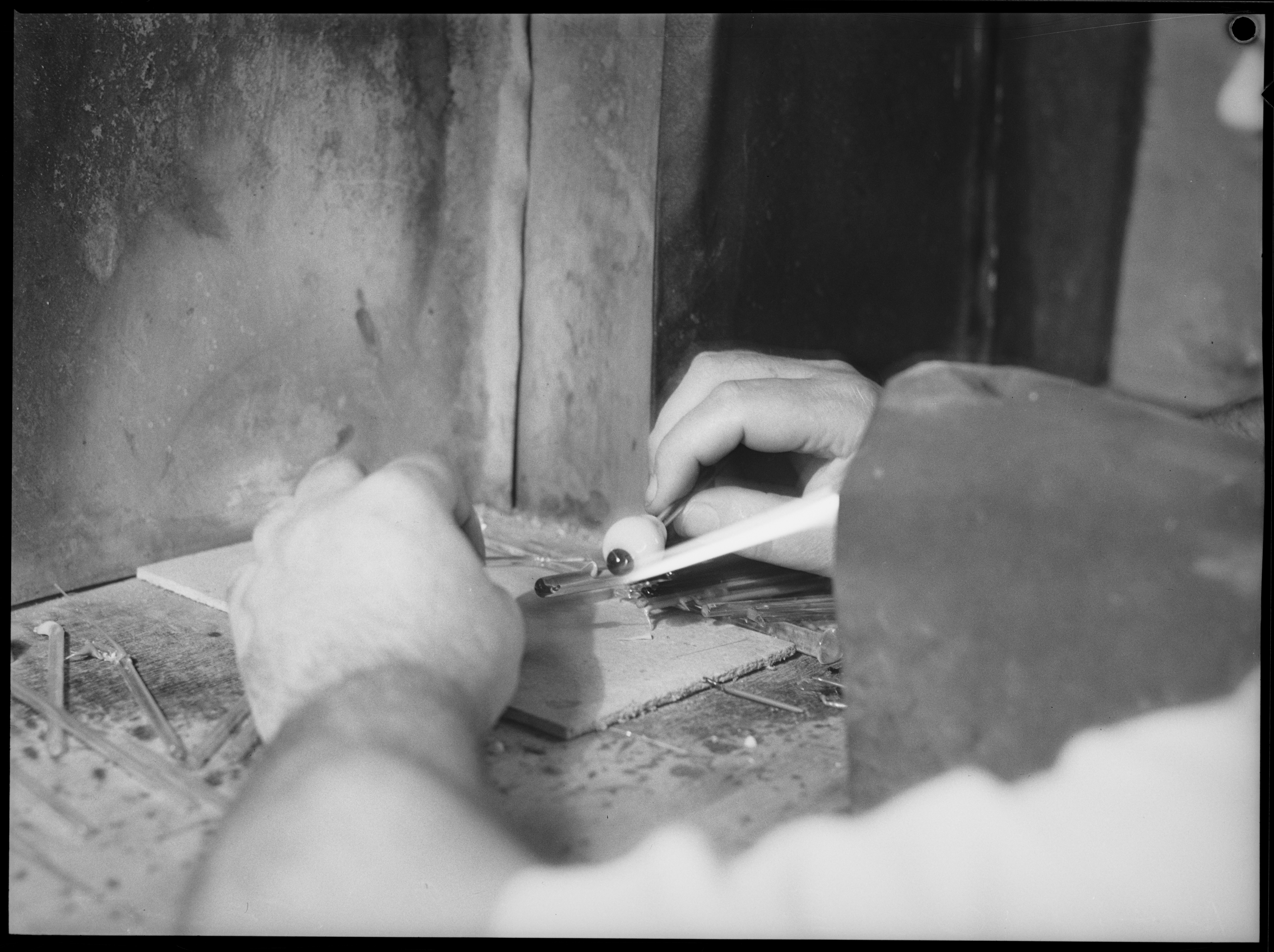
Glass eye being moulded under heat, 1938.

The earliest known evidence of the use of ocular prosthesis is that of a woman found in Shahr-I Sokhta, Iran dating back to 2900–2800 BC. It has a hemispherical form and a diameter of just over 2.5 cm (1 inch). It consists of very light material, probably bitumen paste. The surface of the artificial eye is covered with a thin layer of gold, engraved with a central circle (representing the iris) and gold lines patterned like sun rays. On both sides of the eye are drilled tiny holes, through which a golden thread could hold the eyeball in place. Since microscopic research has shown that the eye socket showed clear imprints of the golden thread, the eyeball must have been worn during her lifetime. In addition to this, an early Hebrew text references a woman who wore an artificial eye made of gold. Roman and Egyptian priests are known to have produced artificial eyes as early as the fifth century BC constructed from painted clay attached to cloth and worn outside the socket.

The first in-socket artificial eyes were made of gold with colored enamel, later evolving into the use of glass by the Venetians in the later part of the sixteenth century. These were crude, uncomfortable, and fragile and the production methodology remained known only to Venetians until the end of the 18th century, when Paris took over as the center for artificial eye-making. But the center shifted again, this time to Germany because of their superior glass blowing techniques. In England, the prominent artificial glass eye maker Thomas Pache managed to perfect Herman Snellen's reformed eye using English glass, which enabled his company Pache & Son to supply most of the United Kingdom. Shortly following the introduction of the art of glass eye-making to the United States, German goods became unavailable because of World War II. As a result, the US instead made artificial eyes from the plastic polymethyl methacrylate (PMMA), commonly known as acrylic.

Production of modern ocular prosthetics has expanded from simply using glass into many different types of materials. In the United States, most custom ocular prostheses are fabricated from acrylic. In some countries, Germany especially, prostheses are still most commonly made from glass.

=== Limits of realism ===
Ocularist surgeons have always worked together to make artificial eyes look more realistic. For decades, all efforts and investments to improve the appearance of artificial eyes have been dampened by the immobility of the pupil. One solution to this problem has been demonstrated recently in a device based on an LCD which simulates the pupil size as a function of the ambient light.

== Implant types and chemical construction ==
There are many different types of implants, classification ranging from shape (spherical vs egg (oval) shaped), stock vs custom, porous vs nonporous, specific chemical make-up, and the presence of a peg or motility post. The most basic simplification can be to divide implant types into two main groups: non-integrated (non-porous) and integrated (porous).

=== Nonintegrated implants ===
Though there is evidence that ocular implants have been around for thousands of years, modern nonintegrated spherical intraconal implants came into existence around 1976 . Nonintegrated implants contain no unique apparatus for attachments to the extraocular muscles and do not allow in-growth of organic tissue into their inorganic substance. Such implants have no direct attachment to the ocular prosthesis. Usually, these implants are covered with a material that permits fixation of the extraocular recti muscles, such as donor sclera or polyester gauze which improves implant motility, but does not allow for direct mechanical coupling between the implant and the artificial eye. Non-integrated implants include acrylic, glass, and silicone spheres.

==== Polymethyl methacrylate (PMMA) (acrylic) ====
Polymethyl methacrylate (PMMA), commonly known as acrylic, is a transparent thermoplastic available for use as ocular prosthesis, replacement intraocular lenses when the original lens has been removed in the treatment of cataracts and has historically been used as hard contact lenses.

PMMA has a good degree of compatibility with human tissue, much more so than glass. Although various materials have been used to make nonintegrated implants in the past, polymethyl methacrylate is one of the implants of choice.

=== Integrated implants (porous) ===
The porous nature of integrated implants allows fibrovascular ingrowth throughout the implant and thus also insertion of pegs or posts. Because direct mechanical coupling is thought to improve artificial eye motility, attempts have been made to develop so-called 'integrated implants' that are directly connected to the artificial eye. Historically, implants that directly attached to the prosthesis were unsuccessful because of chronic inflammation or infection arising from the exposed nonporous implant material. This led to the development of quasi-integrated implants with a specially designed anterior surface that allegedly better transferred implant motility to the artificial eye through the closed conjunctiva and Tenon's capsule. In 1985, the problems associated with integrated implants were thought to be largely solved with the introduction of spherical implants made of porous calcium hydroxyapatite. This material allows for fibrovascular ingrowth within several months. Porous enucleation implants currently are fabricated from a variety of materials including natural and synthetic hydroxyapatite, aluminium oxide, and polyethylene.

The surgeon can alter the contour of porous implants before insertion, and it is also possible to modify the contour in situ, although this is sometimes difficult.

==== Hydroxyapatite (HA) ====
Hydroxyapatite implants are spherical and made in a variety of sizes and different materials (coralline/synthetic).

Since their approval by the Food and Drug Administration in 1989, spherical hydroxyapatite implants have gained widespread popularity as an enucleation implant and was at one point the most commonly used orbital implant in the United States. The porous nature of this material allows fibrovascular ingrowth throughout the implant and permits insertion of a coupling device (PEG) with reduced risk of inflammation or infection associated with earlier types of exposed integrated implants.

Hydroxyapatite is limited to preformed (stock) spheres (for enucleation) or granules (for building up defects).

One main disadvantage of HA is that it needs to be covered with exogenous material, such as sclera, polyethylene terephthalate, or vicryl mesh (which has the disadvantage of creating a rough implant tissue interface that can lead to technical difficulties in implantation and subsequent erosion of overlying tissue with the end stage being extrusion), as direct suturing is not possible for muscle attachment. Scleral covering carries with it the risk of transmission of infection, inflammation, and rejection.

A 2008 study showed that HA has a more rapid rate of fibrovascularization than MEDPOR, a high-density porous polyethylene implant manufactured from linear high-density polyethylene.

==== Porous polyethylene (PP) ====
Development in polymer chemistry has allowed introduction of newer biocompatible material such as porous polyethylene (PP) to be introduced into the field of orbital implant surgery. Porous polyethylene enucleation implants have been used since at least 1989. It is available in dozens of prefabricated spherical and non-spherical shapes and in different sizes or plain blocks for individualized intraoperative customizing. The material is firm but malleable and allows direct suturing of muscles to implant without wrapping or extra steps. Additionally, the smooth surface is less abrasive and irritating than other materials used for similar purposes. Polyethylene also becomes vascularized, allowing placement of a titanium motility post that joins the implant to the prosthesis in the same way that the peg is used for hydroxyapatite implants.

PP has been shown to have a good outcome, and in 2004, it was the most commonly used orbital implant in the United States. Porous polyethylene fulfills several criteria for a successful implant, including little propensity to migrate and restoration of defect in an anatomic fashion; it is readily available, cost-effective, and can be easily modified or custom-fit for each defect. The PP implant does not require to be covered and therefore avoids some of the problems associated with hydroxyapatite implants.

==== Bioceramic ====
Bioceramic prosthetics are made of aluminium oxide (Al_{2}O_{3}). Aluminium oxide is a ceramic biomaterial that has been used for more than 35 years in the orthopedic and dental fields for a variety of prosthetic applications because of its low friction, durability, stability, and inertness. Aluminium oxide ocular implants can be obtained in spherical and non-spherical (egg-shaped) shapes and in different sizes for use in the anophthalmic socket. It received US Food and Drug Administration approval in April 2000 and was approved by Health and Welfare, Canada, in February 2001.

Aluminium oxide has previously been shown to be more biocompatible than HA in cell culture studies and has been suggested as the standard reference material when biocompatibility studies are required to investigate new products. The rate of exposure previously associated with the bioceramic implant (2%) was less than most reports on the HA or porous polyethylene implant (0% to 50%).

==== Conical orbital implant (COI) and multipurpose conical orbital implant (MCOI) ====
The safe and effective sphere (still popular and easy to use) was supplemented with the pyramid or COI implant. The COI has unique design elements that have been incorporated into an overall conical shape, including a flat anterior surface, superior projection and preformed channels for the rectus muscles. 5-0 Vicryl suture needles can be passed with slight difficulty straight through the implant to be tied on the anterior surface. In addition, this implant features a slightly recessed slot for the superior rectus and a protrusion to fill the superior fornix.

As of 2005 the newest model is the multipurpose conical orbital implant (MCOI), which was designed to address the issues of the postoperative anophthalmic orbit being at risk for the development of socket abnormalities including enophthalmos, retraction of the upper eyelid, deepening of the superior sulcus, backward tilt of the prothesis, and stretching of the lower eyelid after evisceration or enucleation. These problems are generally thought to be secondary to orbital volume deficiencies which is also addressed by MCOIs. The conical shape of the MCOI more closely matches the anatomic shape of the orbit than a spherical implant. The wider anterior portion, combined with the narrower and longer posterior portion, allows for a more complete and natural replacement of the lost orbital volume. This shape reduces the risk of superior sulcus deformity and puts more volume within the muscle cone. Muscles can be placed at any location the surgeon desires with these implants. This is advantageous for cases of damaged or lost muscles after trauma, and the remaining muscles are transposed to improve postoperative motility. In anticipation of future peg placement there is a 6 mm (0.24 in) diameter flattened surface, which eliminates the need to shave a flat anterior surface prior to peg placement.

Both implants (COI and MCOI) are composed of interconnecting channels that allow ingrowth of host connective tissue. Complete implant vascularization reduces the risk of infection, extrusion, and other complications associated with nonintegrated implants. Additionally, both implants produce superior motility and postoperative cosmesis.

==== Pegged (motility post) implants ====
In hydroxyapatite implants, a secondary procedure can insert an externalized, round-headed peg or screw into the implant. The prosthesis is modified to accommodate the peg, creating a ball-and-socket joint. After fibrovascular ingrowth is completed, a small hole can be drilled into the anterior surface of the implant. After conjunctivalization of this hole, it can be fitted with a peg with a rounded top that fits into a corresponding dimple at the posterior surface of the artificial eye. This peg thus directly transfers implant motility to the artificial eye. However, the motility peg is mounted in a minority of patients. This may partially be due to problems associated with peg placement, whereas hydroxyapatite implants are assumed to yield superior artificial eye motility even without the peg.

Polyethylene also becomes vascularized, allowing placement of a titanium motility post that joins the implant to the prosthesis in the same way that the peg is used for hydroxyapatite implants.

== Implant movement ==
Implant and prosthesis movement are important aspects of the overall cosmetic appearance after enucleation, and are essential to the objective of crafting a lifelike eye similar in all aspects to the normal fellow eye. There are several theories of improved eye movement, such as using integrating prosthetic material, pegging the implant, covering the implant (e.g. with scleral tissue), or suturing the eye muscles directly to the prosthetic implant. The efficiency of transmitting movement from the implant to the prosthesis determines the degree of prosthetic motility. Movement is transmitted from traditional nonporous spherical implants through the surface tension at the conjunctival–prosthetic interface and movement of the fornices. Quasi-integrated implants have irregularly shaped surfaces that create an indirect coupling mechanism between the implant and prosthesis that imparts greater movement to the prosthesis. Directly integrating the implant to the prosthesis through an externalized coupling mechanism would be expected to improve motility further.

Despite the reasoning stating that hydroxyapatite orbital implants without a motility peg would yield a superior artificial eye motility, when similar surgical techniques are used, unpegged porous (hydroxyapatite) enucleation implants and donor sclera-covered nonporous (acrylic) spherical enucleation implants yield comparable artificial eye motility. In two studies, there were no differences in maximum amplitude between hydroxyapatite and acrylic or silicone spherical enucleation implants, thus indicating that the implant material itself may not have a bearing on implant movement as long as the muscles are attached directly or indirectly to the implant and the implant is not pegged. The motility of a nonintegrated artificial eye may be caused by at least two forces:

1. The rubbing force between the posterior surface of the artificial eye and the conjunctiva that covers the implant may cause the artificial eye to move. Because this force is likely to be approximately equal in all directions, it would cause comparable horizontal and vertical artificial eye amplitudes.
2. An artificial eye usually fits snugly in the conjunctival space (possibly not in the superior fornix). Therefore, any movement of the conjunctival fornices will cause a similar movement of the artificial eye, whereas lack of movement of the fornices will restrict its motility.

Imbrication of the rectus muscles over a nonintegrated implant traditionally was thought to impart movement to the implant and prosthesis. Like a ball-and-socket joint, when the implant moves, the prosthesis moves. However, because the so-called ball and socket are separated by layers of Tenon's capsule, imbricated muscles, and conjunctiva, the mechanical efficiency of transmission of movement from the implant to the prosthesis is suboptimal. Moreover, the concern is that imbrication of the recti over nonintegrated implants actually can result in implant migration. The recent myoconjuctival technique of enucleation is an alternative to muscle imbrication.

Although it is generally accepted that integrating the prosthesis to a porous implant with peg insertion enhances prosthetic movement, there is little available evidence in the literature that documents the degree of improvement. In addition to this, although the porous implants have been reported to offer improved implant movement, these are more expensive and intrusive, require wrapping and subsequent imaging to determine vascularization and pegging to provide for better transmission of implant movement to the prosthesis, and are prone to implant exposure.

Age and size of the implant may also affect the motility, since in a study comparing patients with hydroxyapatite implants and patients with nonporous implants, the implant movement appeared to decrease with age in both groups. This study also demonstrated improved movement of larger implants irrespective of material.

== Surgical procedure ==
Enucleation and orbital implantation surgery follows these steps:

- Anesthesia
- Conjunctival peritomy
- Separation of the anterior Tenon's fascia from the sclera
- Pass sutures through rectus muscles
- Rectus muscles disinserted from the globe
- Rotate and elevate the globe
- Open Tenon's capsule to visualize optic nerve
- Cauterize necessary blood vessels
- Divide the nerve
- Remove the eye
- Hemostasis is achieved with either cautery or digital pressure
- Insert orbital implant.
- If necessary (hydroxyapatite) cover the implant with wrapping material before
- Attach the muscle (if possible) either directly (PP) or indirectly (HA) to implant.
- Create fenestrations in wrapping material if necessary
- For HA implants drill 1 mm holes as muscle insertion site
- Draw Tenon's fascia over implant
- Close Tenon's facia in one or two layers
- Suture conjunctiva
- Insert temporary ocular conformer until prosthesis is received (4–8 weeks later)
- After implant vascularization, an optional secondary procedure can be done to place a couple peg or post.

Also under anesthesia:

- Create conjunctival incision at the peg insertion site
- Create hole into implant to insert peg or post
- Modify prosthesis to receive peg/post.

The surgery is done under general anesthesia with the addition of extra subconjunctival and/or retrobulbar anesthetics injected locally in some cases. The following is a description of the surgical procedure performed by Custer et al.:

The conjunctival peritomy is performed at the corneal limbus, preserving as much healthy tissue as possible. Anterior Tenon's fascia is separated from the sclera. Blunt dissection in the four quadrants between the rectus muscles separates deep Tenon's fascia.

Sutures may be passed through the rectus muscles before their disinsertion from the globe. Some surgeons also suture one or both oblique muscles. Traction sutures or clamps may be applied to the horizontal rectus muscle insertions to assist in rotating and elevating the globe during the ensuing dissection. Tenon's capsule may be opened posteriorly to allow visualization of the optic nerve. The vortex veins and posterior ciliary vessels may be cauterized before dividing the nerve and removing the eye. Alternatively, the optic nerve may be localized with a clamp before transection. Hemostasis is achieved with either cautery or digital pressure.

The orbital implant is inserted at the time of enucleation. An appropriately sized implant should replace the volume of the globe and leave sufficient room for the ocular prosthesis. Enucleation implants are available in a variety of sizes that may be determined by using sizing implants or calculated by measuring globe volume or axial length of the contralateral eye.

In the past, spherical nonporous implants were placed in the intraconal space and the extraocular muscles were either left unattached or were tied over the implant. Wrapping these implants allows attachment of the muscles to the covering material, a technique that seems to improve implant movement and reduce the incidence of implant migration. Porous implants may be saturated with antibiotic solution before insertion. Because the brittle nature of hydroxyapatite prevents direct suturing of the muscles to the implant, these implants are usually covered with some form of wrapping material. The muscles are attached to the implant in a technique similar to that used for spherical non-porous implants. The muscles may be directly sutured to porous polyethylene implants either by passing the suture through the implant material or by using an implant with fabricated suture tunnels. Some surgeons also wrap porous polyethylene implants either to facilitate muscle attachment or to reduce the risk of implant exposure. A variety of wrapping materials have been used to cover porous implants, including polyglactin or polyglycolic acid mesh, heterologous tissue (bovine pericardium), homologous donor tissue (sclera, dermis), and autogenous tissue (fascia lata, temporalis fascia, posterior auricular muscle, rectus abdominis sheath).

Fenestrations in the wrapping material are created at the insertion sites of the extraocular muscles, allowing the attached muscles to be in contact with the implant and improving implant vascularization. Drilling 1 mm holes into the implant at the muscle insertion sites is performed to facilitate vascularization of hydroxyapatite implants. Tenon's fascia is drawn over the implant and closed in one or two layers. The conjunctiva is then sutured.

A temporary ocular conformer is inserted at the completion of the pro- cedure and is worn until the patient receives a prosthesis 4 to 8 weeks after surgery.

An elective secondary procedure is required to place the coupling peg or post in those patients who desire improved prosthetic motility. That procedure is usually delayed for at least 6 months after enucleation to allow time for implant vascularization. Technetium bone or gadolinium-enhanced magnetic resonance imaging scans are not now universally used, but they have been used to confirm vascularization before peg insertion. Under local anesthesia, a conjunctival incision is created at the peg insertion site. A hole is created into the porous implant to allow insertion of the peg or post. The prosthesis is then modified to receive the peg or post. Some surgeons have preplaced coupling posts in porous polyethylene implants at the time of enucleation. The post may spontaneously expose or is externalized in a later procedure via a conjunctival incision.

== Aftermath of surgical procedures ==
Regardless of the procedure, a type of ocular prosthesis is always needed afterwards. The surgeon will insert a temporary prosthesis at the end of the surgery, known as a stock eye, and refer the patient to an ocularist, who is not a medical doctor, but (in the United States) a board certified ocularist by the American Society of Ocularists. The process of making an ocular prosthesis, or a custom eye, will begin, usually six weeks after the surgical procedure, and it typically will take up to three visits before the final fitting of the prosthesis. In most cases, the patient will be fitted during the first visit, return for the hand-painting of the prosthesis, and finally come back for the final fitting. The methods used to fit, shape, and paint the prosthesis often vary to suit both ocularist and patient needs.

Living with an ocular prosthesis requires care, but oftentimes patients who have had incurable eye disorders, such as micropthalmia, anophtalmia or retinoblastoma, achieve a better quality of life with their prostheses. It is generally recommended to leave the prosthesis in the socket as much as possible, though it may require some cleaning and lubrication, as well as regular polishing and check-ups with ocularists.

== Notable people with prosthetic eyes ==
- Bhumibol Adulyadej – King of Thailand; lost his eye in a 1948 car crash (right eye)
- Baz Bastien – Canadian ice hockey player, coach (right eye)
- Mokhtar Belmokhtar – Algerian smuggler, kidnapper, weapons dealer, and terrorist; lost his eye mishandling explosives (left eye)
- Sammy Davis Jr. – American entertainer (left eye)
- Peter Falk – American actor (right eye)
- Tex Avery – American animation director (left eye)
- Ry Cooder – American musician best known for his slide guitar work (left eye)
- Nick Griffin – British National Party leader (left eye)
- Jay Horwitz (born 1945), American executive for the New York Mets baseball team (right eye)
- Leo McKern – Actor (left eye)
- Carl Ouellet – Canadian professional wrestler (right eye)
- Claus Schenk Graf von Stauffenberg – German career army officer and resistance leader (left eye)
- Robert Thurman – Writer (left eye)
- Mo Udall – American politician (right eye)
- Fetty Wap - American rapper (left eye)
- Gordon Brown - Former Prime Minister of the United Kingdom (left eye)
- Helmut Marko - Formula 1 racing driver (left eye)
- Leo Fender - Inventor (left eye)
- Jeff Healey - Guitarist (both eyes)
