= Vaud =

Canton of Switzerland

Vaud Vôd (Arpitan) Waadt (German)
- Canton
- Canton Vaud; Canton de Vaud (French)
- Flag Coat of arms Logo
- Motto: Liberté et Patrie ("Freedom and Fatherland")
- Anthem: Hymne vaudois ("The Vaudese Anthem")
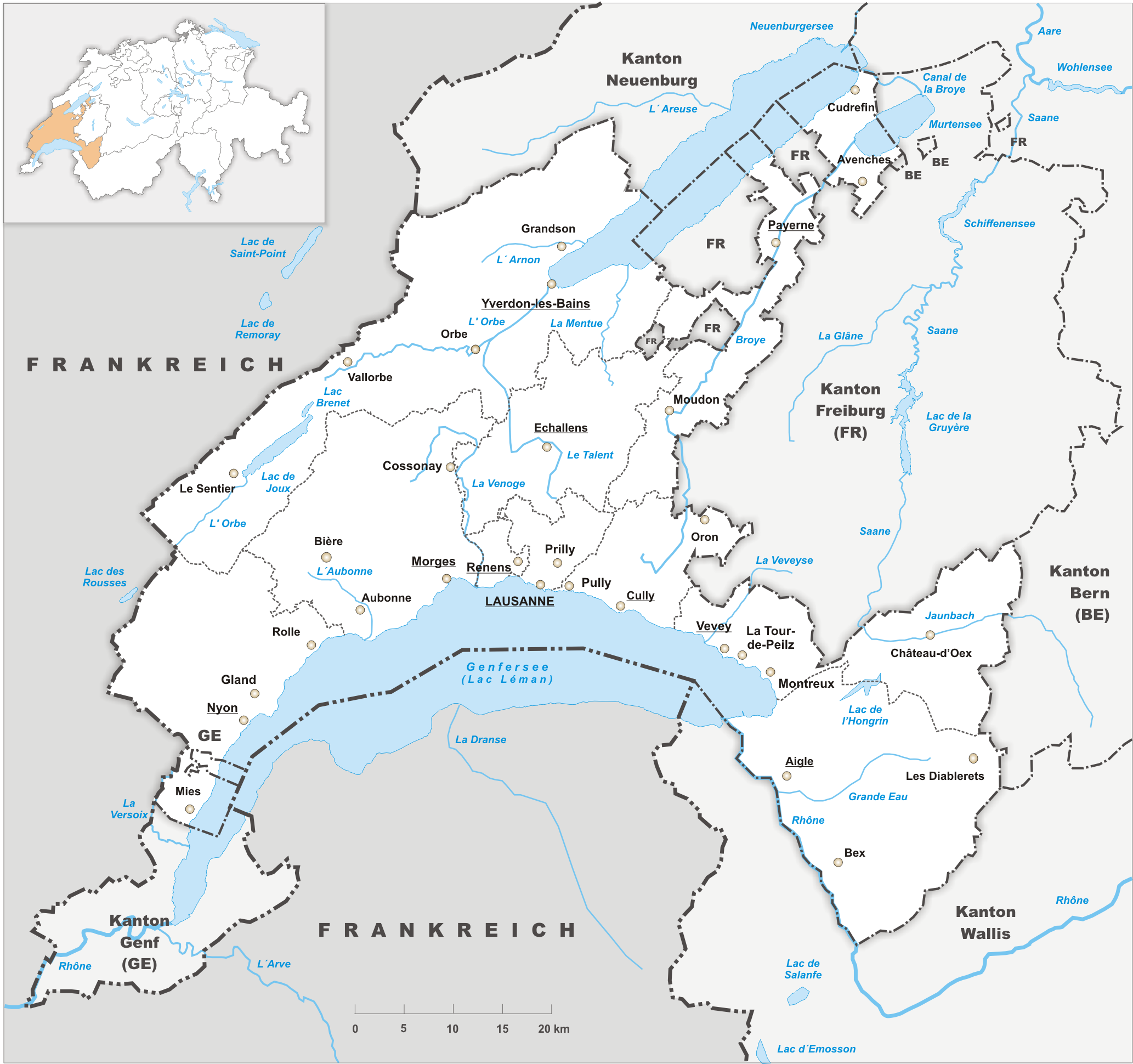
- Location in Switzerland Map of Vaud
- Coordinates: 46°36′N 6°33′E
- Country: Switzerland
- Capital and largest city: Lausanne
- Subdivisions: 300 municipalities, 10 districts

Government
  - President: Christelle Luisier
  - Executive: Conseil d’État (7)
  - Legislative: Grand Council (150)

Area
  - Total: 3,211.94 km^{2} (1,240.14 sq mi)

Population (December 2020)
  - Total: 814,762
  - Density: 253.667/km^{2} (656.994/sq mi)

GDP
  - Total: CHF 56.898 billion (2020)
  - Per capita: CHF 70,250 (2020)
- ISO 3166 code: CH-VD
- Highest point: 3,210 m (10,531 ft): Diablerets
- Lowest point: 372 m (1,220 ft): Lake Leman
- Joined: 1803
- Languages: French
- Website: vd.ch

Vaud (/voʊ/ VOH; French: Vaud, pronounced [vo]; German: Waadt), more formally Canton of Vaud (French: Canton de Vaud, German: Kanton Waadt), is one of the 26 cantons forming the Swiss Confederation. It is composed of ten districts; its capital city is Lausanne. Its coat of arms bears the motto "Liberté et Patrie" on a white-green bicolour.

Vaud is the third-largest Swiss canton by population and fourth by size. It is located in Romandy, the French-speaking western part of the country, and borders the canton of Neuchâtel to the north, the cantons of Fribourg and Bern to the east, the canton of Valais to the south, the canton of Geneva to the south-west, and France to the west. The geography of the canton includes all three natural regions of Switzerland: the Jura Mountains, the Swiss Plateau, and the (Swiss) Alps. It also includes some of the largest lakes of the country: Lake Geneva and Lake Neuchâtel. It is a major tourist destination, renowned for its landscapes and gastronomy.

The largest city is Lausanne, followed by Yverdon-les-Bains and Montreux. As of 2020, the canton had a population of 814,762. It is one of the four cantons where French is the only official language. Formerly a Bernese bailiwick, Vaud joined the Swiss Confederation as an independent canton in 1803.

== History ==
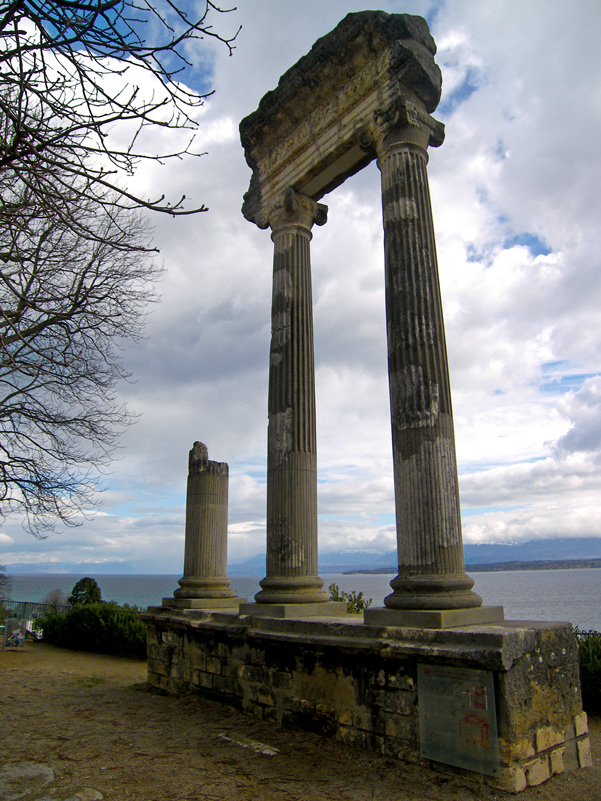
Roman column in Nyon

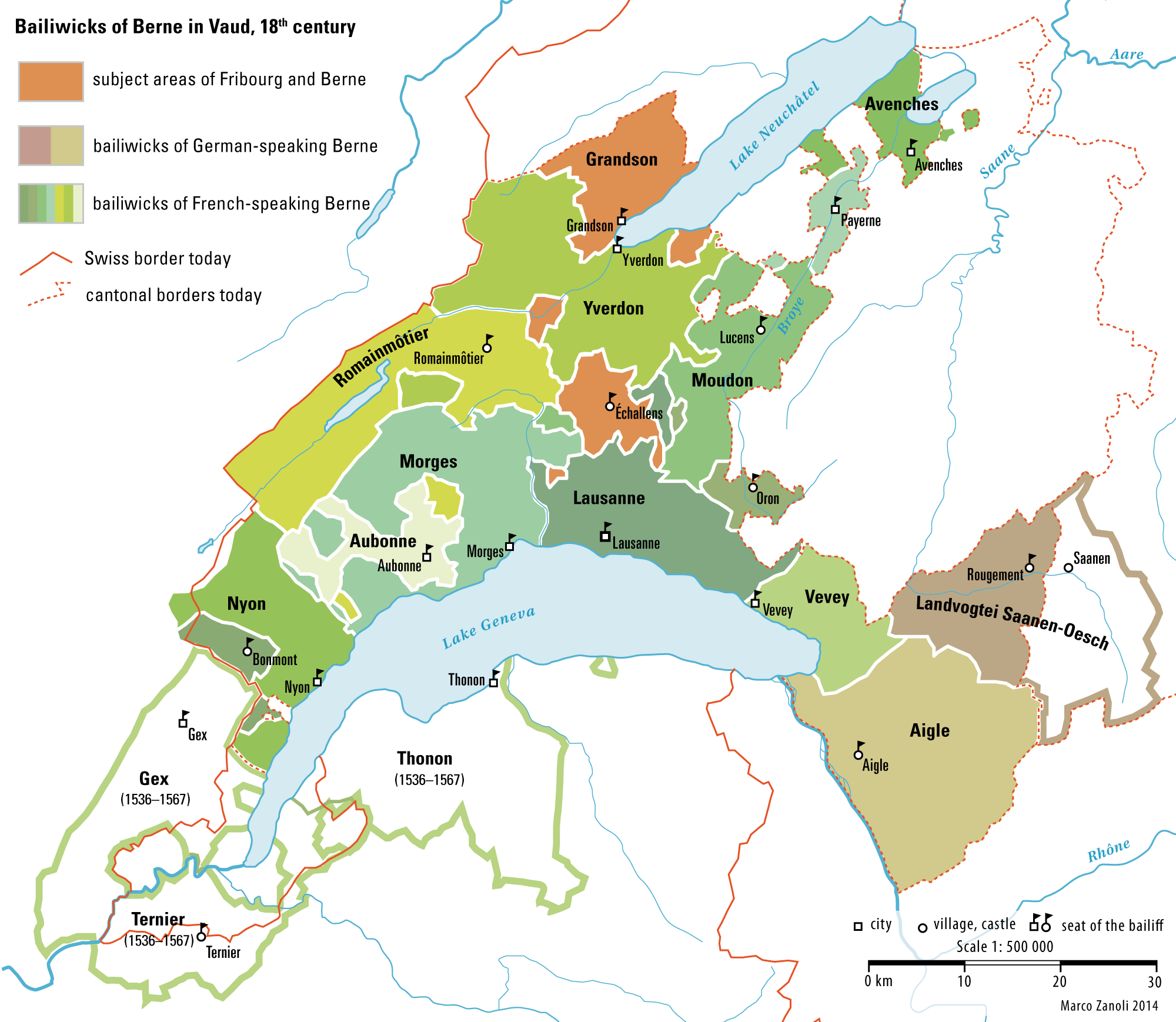
Bailiwicks of Bern in Vaud in the 18th century

Humans lived alongside the Vaud lakes in prehistoric times. Later, the Celtic tribe of the Helvetii inhabited the area. Caesar's troops defeated the Helvetii in 58 BC and as a consequence the Romans settled in the area. The many towns established by the Romans include Vevey (Latin: Viviscus) and Lausanne (Lausonium or Lausonna).

While the exact date of the founding of Aventicum is not exact, it was likely established during or shortly after Augustus' reign. There are still many Roman remains around the town today. Between the 2nd and the 4th centuries Alemannic tribes repeatedly invaded the area, and in the 5th century the Burgundians occupied the territory. The Merovingian Franks later replaced the Burgundians. Their control did not last long either, and in 888 the area of the canton of Vaud became part of the Carolingian Empire (the successor state to the Merovingians). In 1032 the Zähringens of Germany defeated the Burgundians. The Zähringens themselves were succeeded in 1218 by the counts of Savoy. It was only under the counts of Savoy that the area gained political unity as the Barony of Vaud. A part stretching from Attalens to the river Sarine, in the north, was absorbed by the canton of Fribourg.

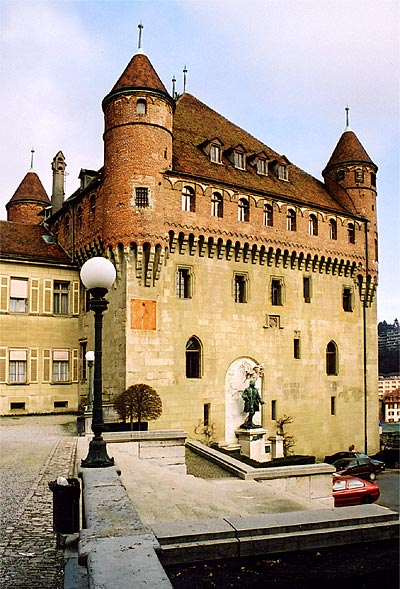
Built by the Bishop of Lausanne during the 15th century, Château Saint-Maire has been the seat of the cantonal government since 1803.

As the power of the House of Savoy declined at the beginning of the 15th century, troops from Bern occupied the land. By 1536 Bern had completely annexed the area. Vaud's Protestant Reformation started with co-workers of John Calvin like Pierre Viret (a famous debate took place at the cathedral of Lausanne), but it was only decisively implemented when Bern put its full force behind it.

The Bernese occupiers were not popular amongst the population. In 1723 Major Abraham Davel led a revolt against Bern, in protest at what he saw as the denial of political rights of the French-speaking Vaudois by the German-speaking Bernese; he was subsequently beheaded. Later, inspired by the French Revolution of 1789–1799, the Vaudois drove out the Bernese governor in 1798 and declared the Lemanic Republic. Vaud nationalists like Frédéric-César de La Harpe, born in Rolle, had called for French intervention in liberating the area, and French Revolutionary troops moved in, taking over the whole of Switzerland itself in the process and setting up the Helvetic Republic. Under Napoleon I (Emperor 1804–1815), Vaud became (1798–1803) the canton of Léman. Unrest about the abolition of feudal rights and taxes led to increased discontent, which culminated in the revolt of the Bourla-papey in spring 1802, closely followed by the Stecklikrieg (August to October 1802) that brought the end of the entire Helvetic Republic in 1803. In 1803 Vaud joined the re-installed Swiss Confederation. In spite of Bernese attempts to reclaim Vaud, it has remained a sovereign canton ever since.

In the 19th century, the canton of Vaud was an outspoken opponent of the Sonderbund Catholic separatist movement, which led to intervention by 99,000 Swiss Federal troops under General Henri Dufour against 79,000 separatists, in the Sonderbund War (November 1847). Separation was prevented at the cost of very few lives.

The current cantonal constitution dates from 14 April 2003, replacing the constitution of 1885.

== Geography ==
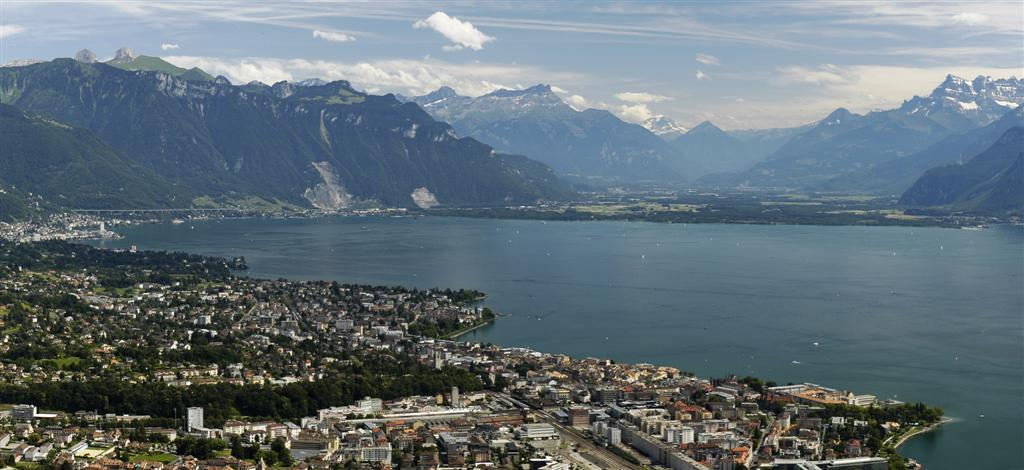
Vevey, Lake Geneva, and the Swiss Alps

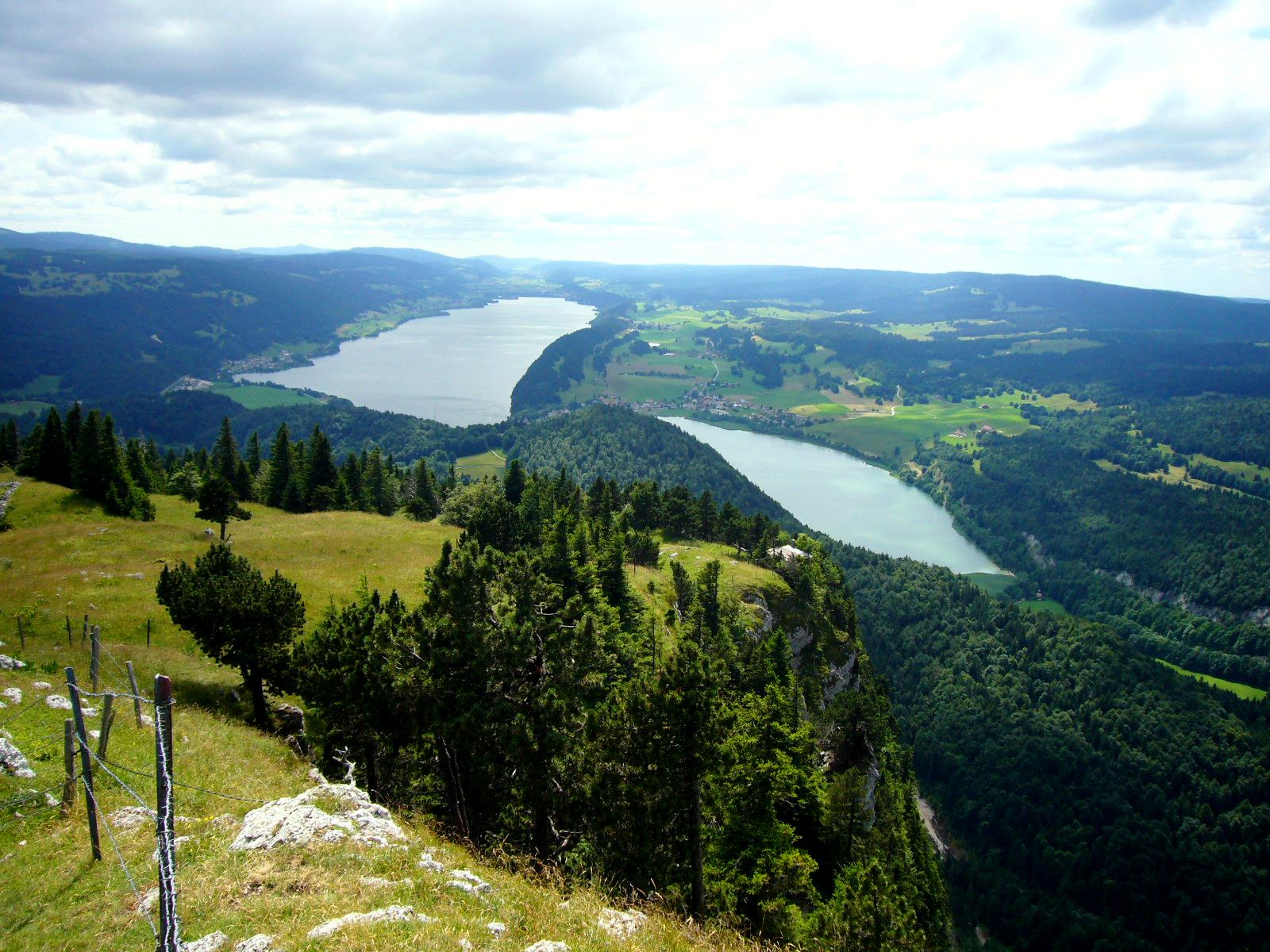
Vallée de Joux, Jura

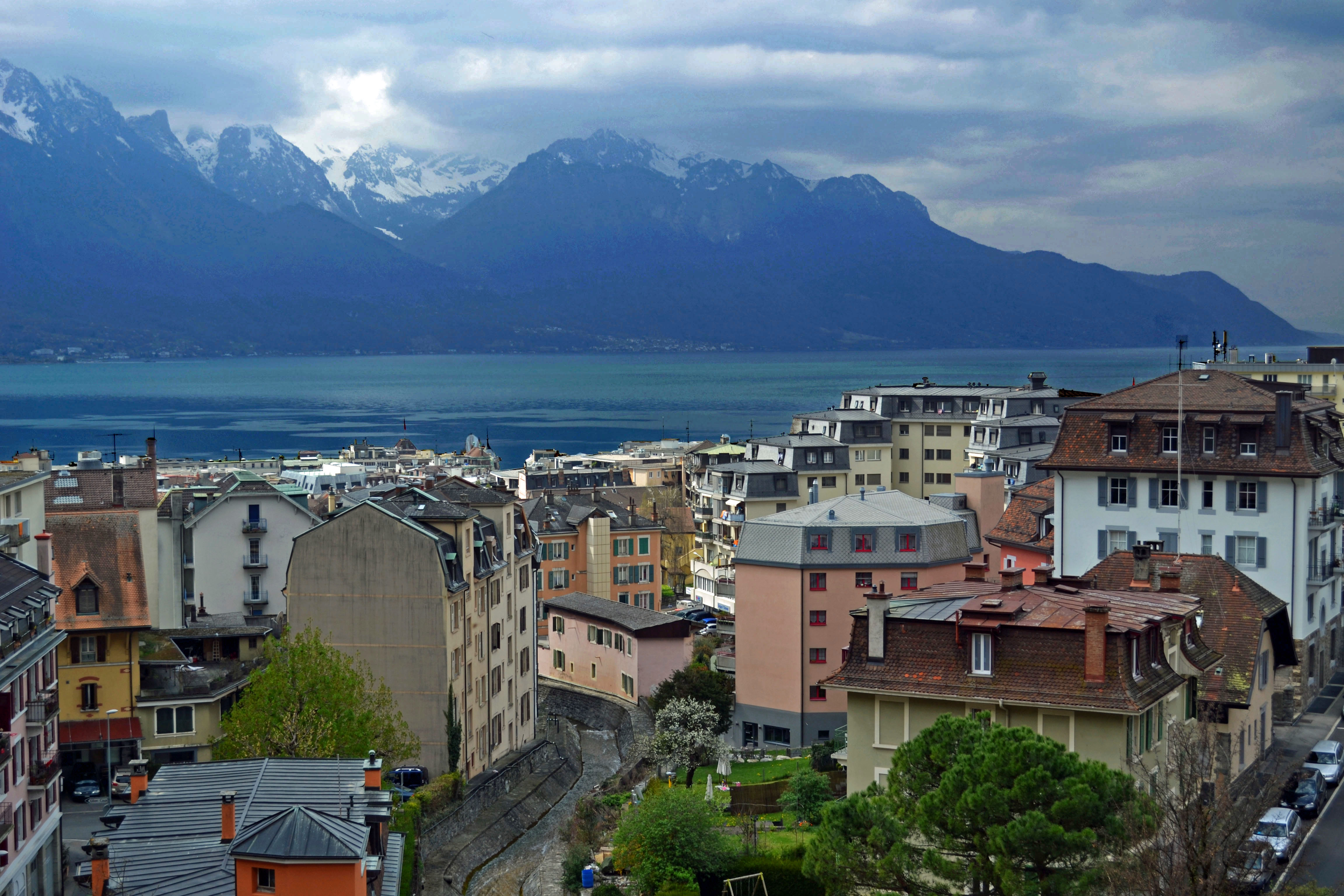
Montreux and Lake Geneva

The canton stretches from Lake Neuchâtel in the north, where it borders the canton of Neuchâtel, to Lake Geneva (French: Léman) in the south, where it borders the canton of Geneva, the French department of Haute-Savoie (lake border) and the canton of Valais (Chablais). In the Jura mountains in the west, the canton borders the French departments of Ain, Jura, and Doubs. In the east, it borders the cantons of Fribourg and Bern. The total area is 3,212 square kilometres (1,240 sq mi).

Along with the canton of Berne, Vaud is one of the two cantons whose territory extends from the Jura to the Alps, through the three distinct geographic regions of Switzerland.

The areas in the south east are mountainous, situated on the north side of the Bernese Alps. This region is commonly named the Vaud Alps (French: Alpes Vaudoises). The Diablerets massif, peaking at 3,210 metres (10,531 ft), is the highest mountain of the canton. Other summits such as the Grand Muveran and the Tour d'Aï are visible from most of the canton. The area also hosts several popular skiing destinations such as Villars, Les Diablerets and Leysin.

The central area of the canton, in contrast, consists of moraines and is hilly. There are plains along the lakes. In the north, Avenches is in an exclave of the canton surrounded by the canton of Fribourg and Lake Neuchâtel. On the other hand, there are three enclaves of the canton of Fribourg (Estavayer-le-lac, Vuissens, Surpierre), as well as two enclaves of the canton of Geneva (Céligny), that are surrounded by the canton of Vaud.

The north-western part of the canton is also mountainous but in a more modest way with mountains generally not above 1,500 metres (4,900 ft); the Jura Mountains. The Vallée de Joux is one of the most popular destinations in the region and also a centre of luxury mechanical Swiss watch manufacturing.

== Politics ==
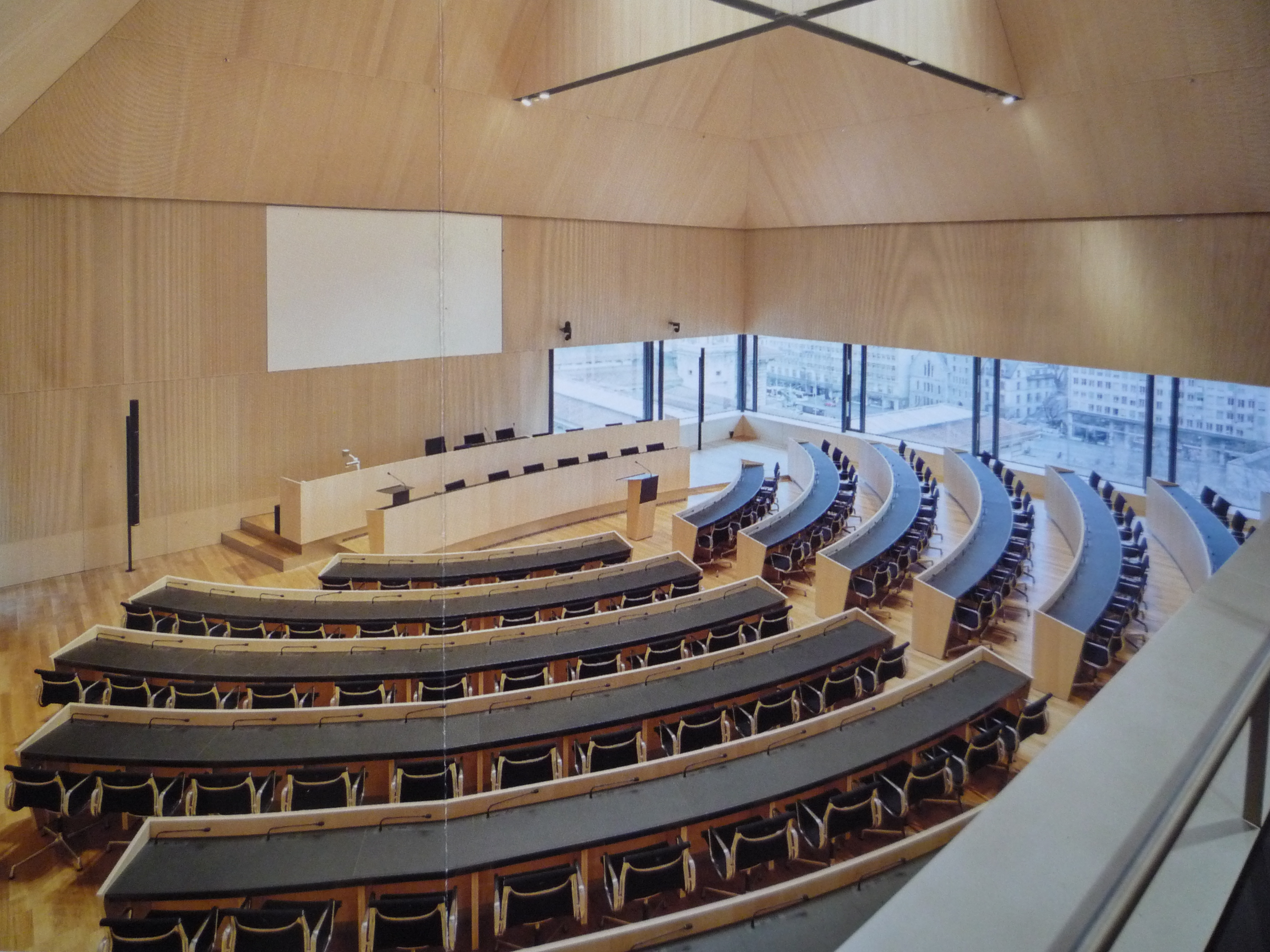
The room of the Grand Council of Vaud, the parliament of the canton of Vaud

=== Members of the National Council ===
Source (as of 2017):

UDC members	PS members	PES members	PLR members	PDC members	PVL member(s)
Michaël Buffat	Pierre-Yves Maillard	Daniel Brélaz	Laurent Wehrli	Claude Béglé	François Pointet
Alice Glauser-Zufferey	Ada Marra	Valentine Python	Jaqueline de Quattro	---	---
Jean-Pierre Grin-Hofmann	Roger Nordmann	Sophie Michaud Gigon	Olivier Feller	---	---
Jacques Nicolet	Brigitte Crottaz	Leonore Porchet	Isabelle Moret	---	---

=== Members of the Council of States ===
Members
Pascal Broulis
Pierre-Yves Maillard

=== Federal election results ===
Percentage of the total vote per party in the canton in the National Council Elections 1971–2023
Party	Ideology	1971	1975	1979	1983	1987	1991	1995	1999	2003	2007	2011	2015	2019	2023
FDP.The Liberals^{a}	Classical liberalism	26.0	25.6	27.1	30.4	27.6	26.4	23.5	25.0	18.5	14.6	16.3	26.8	23.3	22.4
The Centre^{d}	Christian democracy	5.3	4.6	5.1	4.5	4.1	3.6	5.6	4.5	4.4	5.6	4.6	4.1	2.4	4.5
SP/PS	Social democracy	25.0	27.6	24.9	21.9	22.5	22.9	22.7	22.4	21.7	22.0	25.2	22.2	20.4	25.3
SVP/UDC	Swiss nationalism	7.7	8.0	6.8	6.2	6.2	7.3	7.8	10.7	20.3	22.4	22.9	22.6	17.4	19.2
LPS/PLS	Swiss Liberal	12.4	13.6	16.7	16.9	17.4	17.6	14.7	12.6	11.1	8.1	5.7	^{c}	*	*
Ring of Independents	Social liberalism	4.1	1.6	0.8	* ^{b}	*	0.9	*	*	*	*	*	*	*	*
EVP/PEV	Christian democracy	*	*	*	*	*	*	*	*	0.7	1.1	1.1	1.1	1.3	0.7
GLP/PVL	Green liberalism	*	*	*	*	*	*	*	*	*	*	5.1	3.9	8.4	7.5
BDP/PBD	Conservatism	*	*	*	*	*	*	*	*	*	*	0.8	1.8	0.4	0.0^{e}
PdA/PST-POP/PC/PSL	Socialism	12.2	10.7	9.3	4.1	3.5	4.2	8.9	7.8	6.7	4.7	2.1	*	4.1	4.3
GPS/PES	Green politics	*	1.0	6.4	7.0	8.4	6.3	4.1	7.1	11.3	14.3	11.6	11.3	19.7	13.5
FGA	Feminist	*	*	*	3.8	3.7	3.6	2.6	*	*	*	*	*	*	*
Solidarity	Anti-capitalism	*	*	*	*	*	*	2.6	2.1	2.6	2.1	1.8	2.9	*	*
SD/DS	National conservatism	4.2	1.6	*	2.6	2.8	2.9	1.8	0.9	0.3	0.2	0.1	0.1	*	0.0
Rep.	Right-wing populism	2.9	3.1	*	*	*	*	*	*	*	*	*	*	*	*
EDU/UDF	Christian right	*	1.0	*	*	1.1	*	2.7	2.7	1.8	1.3	1.1	0.7	0.3	0.6
FPS/PSL	Right-wing populism	*	*	*	*	*	2.5	*	*	*	*	*	0.0	*	*
MCR	Right-wing populism	*	*	*	*	*	*	*	*	*	*	0.5	*	*	*
Other		*	1.6	2.9	2.6	2.8	1.9	3.1	4.2	0.5	3.7	1.1	2.6	2.3	0,3
Voter participation %		45.9	43.5	37.3	40.2	37.4	37.4	32.9	31.5	42.7	44.3	41.6	42.9	41.4	40.2

^a before 2009: FDP; since 2009: FDP.The Liberals
^b "*" indicates that the party was not on the ballot in this canton.
^c Part of the FDP for this election.

^d before 2021: CVP/PDC/PPD/PCD; since 2021: The Centre

^e BDP/PBD: On 1 January 2021, the party merged with the Christian Democratic People's Party to form the new party The Centre.

== Political subdivisions ==
=== Districts ===
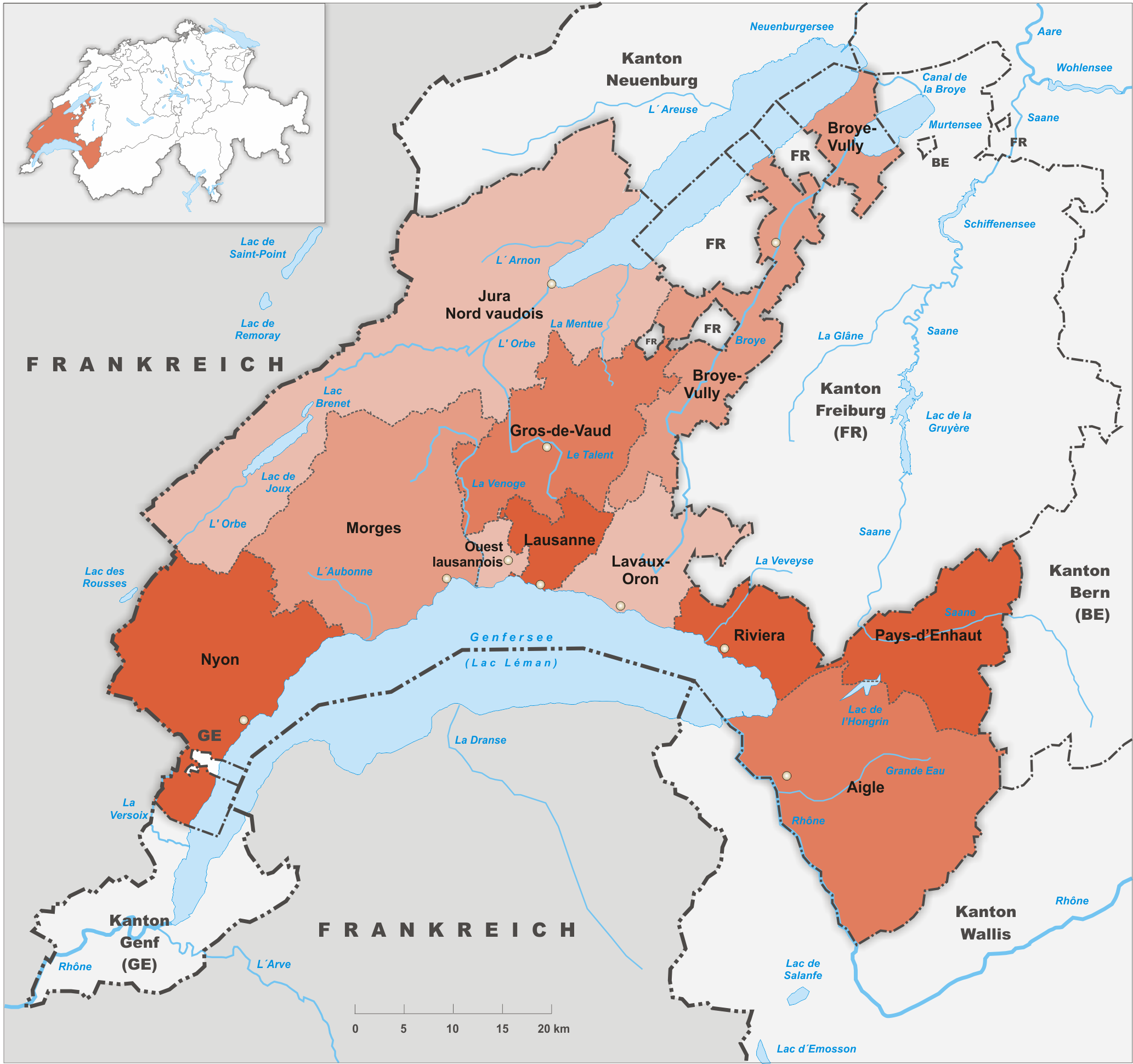
Districts of canton of Vaud

The canton of Vaud is divided into 10 districts:

- Aigle with capital Aigle
- Broye-Vully with capital Payerne
- Gros-de-Vaud with capital Échallens
- Jura-Nord vaudois with capital Yverdon-les-Bains
- Lausanne with capital Lausanne
- Lavaux-Oron with capital Cully
- Morges with capital Morges
- Nyon with capital Nyon
- Riviera-Pays-d'Enhaut with capital Vevey
- Ouest Lausannois with capital Renens

=== Municipalities ===
There are 300 municipalities in the canton (As of 2022).

== Demographics ==
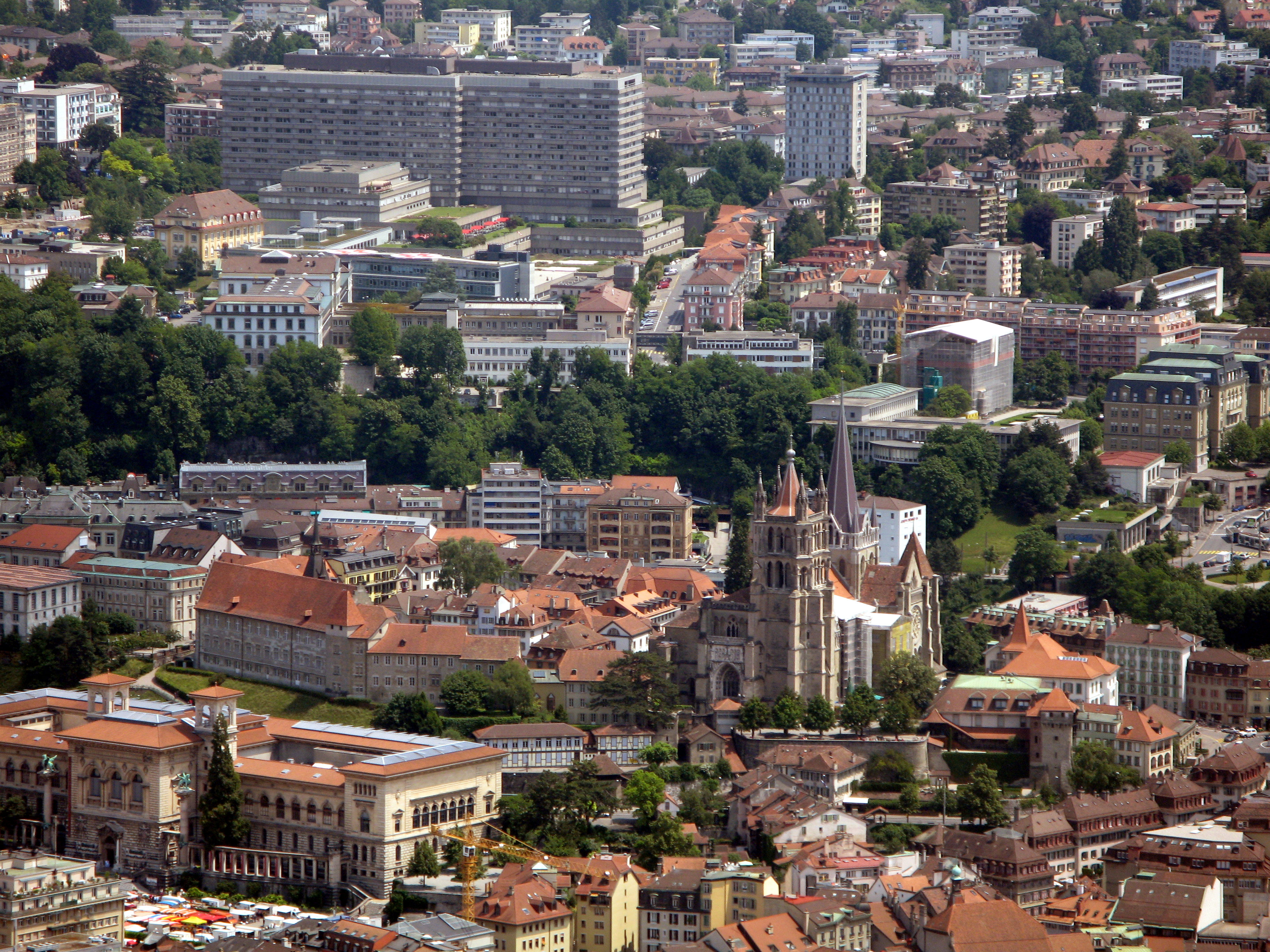
Lausanne, capital and largest city in Vaud

The population is ~80% French-speaking and historically was mostly Protestant (Calvinist), dating from the early years of the Reformation. Recently, however, this has been changing due to immigration from Southern Europe. In 2000, the population was nearly evenly split between Protestants (40%) and Roman Catholics (34%).

The population of the canton (as of 31 December 2020) was 814,762. As of 2010, the population included about 28% foreigners, including many Italians. The major population centres of the canton are: Lausanne (140,202 inhabitants on 31 December 2020), Montreux-Vevey (Montreux: 26090 Vevey:19752 inhabitants) and Yverdon-les-Bains (29,955 inhabitants). The region around Nyon is often considered part of the agglomeration of Geneva. All of these are on Lake Geneva (called Léman in French), except for Yverdon, which is on Lake Neuchâtel.

=== Languages ===
Main languages spoken at home in the canton (2020):

French: 82.40%
English: 9.10%
Portuguese: 7.51%
German: 5.15%
Italian: 5.00%
Spanish: 3.88%
Albanian: 2.37%
South Slavic languages: 1.61%
Other languages: 6.75%
Note: Respondents were permitted to choose more than one language.

== Economy ==
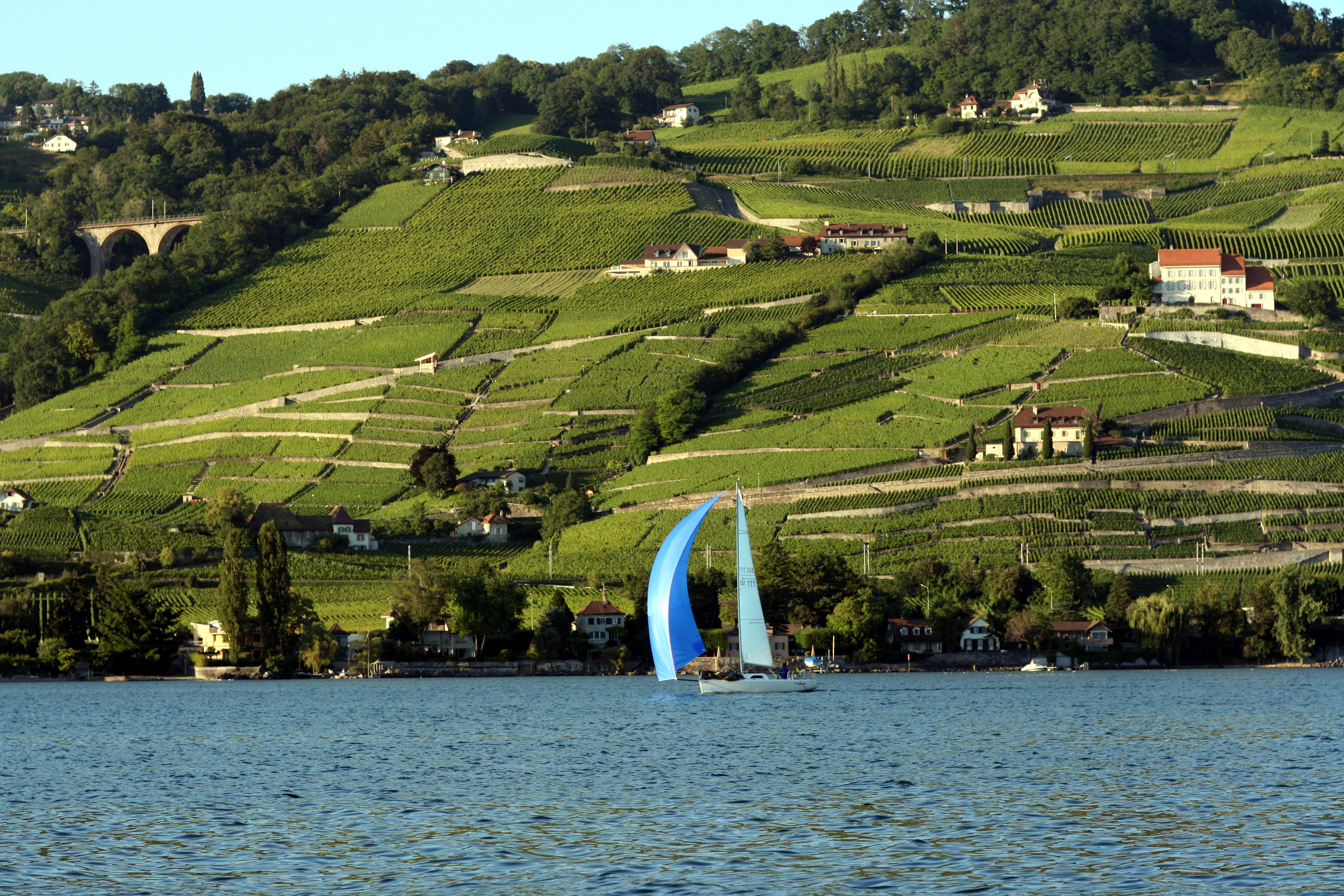
Lavaux vineyards above Lake Geneva

The capital, Lausanne, is the major city of the canton. There are light industries concentrated around it. In 1998, 71.7% of the workers worked in the tertiary sector and 20.8% in the secondary.

The canton is the second-largest producer of wine in Switzerland. Most of the wine produced in the canton is white, and most vineyards are located on the steep shores of Lake Geneva such as the UNESCO World Heritage Site the Lavaux Vineyard Terraces. There is agriculture in the areas away from Lake Geneva. Sugar beet is important around Orbe, tobacco in La Broye Valley, and fruit at the foot of the Jura mountains. Cattle breeding and pasture are common in the Alps and the Jura mountains. There is a salt mine at Bex. Tourism is important in many towns along Lake Geneva. Major lakeside resorts include Lausanne, Montreux, and Vevey.

The Union Cycliste Internationale is based in Aigle, and many of its defamation lawsuits against critics have been heard in the Est Vaudois district court of Vevey.

== Education ==
Two Swiss public universities are located within the canton:

- Swiss Federal Institute of Technology in Lausanne (EPFL)
- University of Lausanne (UNIL)

Additionally, there are several public hautes écoles offering a limited selection of programmes:

- Haute école d'art et de design (ECAL)
- Vaud School of Business and Engineering (HEIG-VD)
- University of Applied Sciences and Arts Western Switzerland (HES-SO)
  - Haute École de Santé La Source (HEdS-La Source)
  - Haute École de travail social et de la santé (EESP)
  - École hôtelière de Lausanne (EHL)
  - Changins
  - Haute école des arts et de la scène (Manufacture)
- Haute École de Santé Vaud (HESAV)
- Haute école de musique (HEMU)
- Haute école pédagogique du Canton de Vaud (HEP Vaud)

== Transport ==
Air travel is served by Geneva Airport. However, nearby airport such as Bern Airport, EuroAirport Basel Mulhouse Freiburg, and Lyon–Saint-Exupéry Airport are used by air travellers from the canton.

== Gastronomy ==
The canton is often referred to as the "culinary capital of Switzerland" and is renowned for its many cheeses, wines and charcuterie. It is also home to a high number of gourmet restaurants, such as the Hôtel de ville in Crissier, founded by Frédy Girardet.

Papet Vaudois is a very popular dish of the canton. It consists of potatoes and leeks accompanied by regional sausages, notably Saucisse aux choux. Taillé aux greubons are a salted bakery specialty of the region consisting of crackling encased in puff pastry. Another of the canton's specialties is carac, a sweet tart consisting of a sweetcrust pastry case (pâte sucrée) filled with chocolate ganache, covered by a characteristic green icing or fondant layer topped with a dot of chocolate.

== Notable people ==
- Caroline Amiguet (born 1977), French actress and model
- Brigitte Balleys (born 1959) a Swiss mezzo-soprano in opera and concert.
- Raymond Burki (1949 in Épalinges – 2016) a Swiss cartoonist.
- Henri Dès (born 1940 in Renens) a Swiss French-language children's singer and songwriter
- Abraham-Louis-Rodolphe Ducros (1748 in Moudon – 1810) a Swiss painter, watercolourist and engraver
- Pierre Gilliard (1879 in Fiez – 1962) a Swiss academic and author, French language tutor to the five children of Emperor Nicholas II of Russia from 1905 to 1918.
- Sieur Jean Pache (1626-1670) Prominent Burgher, Military Commander and Heraldist
- Jean-Louis (Lewis) Pache (1727-1773) Swiss Hosier, Haberdasher, Pastel Merchant
- Charles Henry-Pache (1749–1820) Swiss Pastelist manufacturer and supplier to the Royal Society of Arts
- Marcel Regamey (1905–1982), Swiss essayist and journalist
- Flore Revalles (1889 in Rolle – 1966) a Swiss entertainer, singer and dancer
- Anatoly Shteiger (1907 — 1944 in Leysin) a Russian poet
- Gabriel Tschumi (1883 in Moudon – 1957) Master Chef to Queen Victoria, Kings Edward VII and George V.
- Jean-Louis Wagnière (1739 in Rueyres – 1802) Voltaire's secretary from 1756 to 1778.
- Charles-Emmanuel de Warnery (1720 at Morges - 1776) royal Prussian colonel, later a royal Polish general.
- Georges Dumitresco (1922–2008 in Lausanne), Romanian-Swiss physician, painter, illustrator and poet.

== See also ==
- Franco-Provençal language
- Lausanne campus
- List of mountains of Vaud

== Bibliography ==
- (in French) Laurent Flutsch and Séverine André (with the collaboration of Bernadette Gross), Y en a point comme nous. Un portrait des Vaudois aujourd'hui [There are none like us. A portrait of the Vaudois of today], Éditions Infolio, 2015, 368 pages (ISBN 9782884747615).
