= Anglo Swiss =

Anglo Swiss or Anglo-Swiss describes people or things with joint English and Swiss connections. It may refer to:

- Anglo Swiss Capital, investment company
- Anglo-Swiss Condensed Milk Company, merged into Nestle
