= Jean Pache =

Military Commander and Heraldist

Sieur Jean Pache Bourgeoisie de Morges
- Born: 1626; Morges, Canton of Berne (now Canton of Vaud)
- Died: 1670 (aged 43–44); Morges, Switzerland
- Military career
- Allegiance: Bern Military Administration in Vaud
- Rank: Captain (Bernese Military)
- Commands: Militia of Vullierens and of Vufflens-le-Château
- Other work: Heraldist

Jean Pache's Coat of Arms detailed in the Armorial des Nobles Fusiliers ou Arquebusiers de Lausanne 1655

Sieur Jean Pache 'The Elder' (1626–1670) was a military commander, Heraldist and Burgher of Morges.

He was a member of the Pache Family of Morges, which he claimed descended from the Pazzi banking family, from a member who served as vice-bailiff of Vaud and magistrate in Moudon in 1354 under Count William I of Namur.

== Biography ==
Jean was born sometime in 1626 in Vaud, canton of Berne, into the patrician Pache family. Jean was a descendant of Claude Pache (died 1605), who first obtained the family's bourgeoisie in 1587, in the town of Morges. Claude was elected for the years 1576, 1589 and 1596 abbé (master) of the very influential Guild of Shoemakers.

Around 1655, he was Captain of the Militia in Vullierens and of Vufflens-le-chateau, responsible for coordinating the defense, weaponry logs, and muster rolls for the district under the Bernese military.

He was a member of the noble shooting guild (Noble Abbaye des Fusiliers) in Lausanne, which performed paramilitary functions, such as maintaining public order and territorial defence in the region.

Jean was also a heraldist, to whom we owe several collections of coat of arms in the region, among which the Armorial du Pays de Vaud (also known as 'The Pache Armorial') written in 1654 and dedicated to Johann Ludwig von Erlach.
