= Ocularist =

Someone who specializes in the fabrication and fitting of ocular prostheses

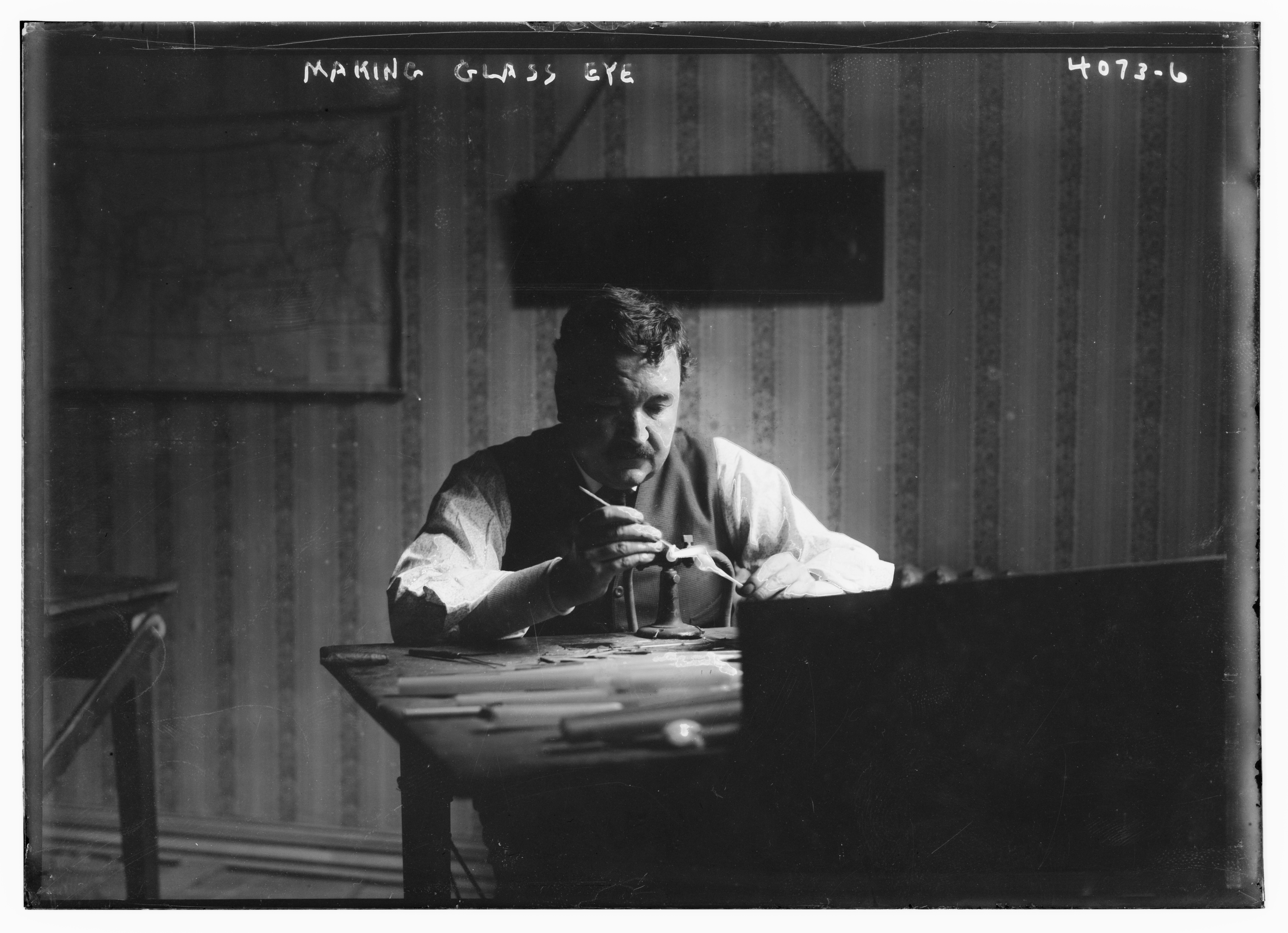
An ocularist making a prosthetic eye, 1915

An ocularist specializes in the fabrication and fitting of ocular prostheses for people who have lost an eye or eyes due to trauma or illness. The fabrication process for a custom made eye typically includes taking an impression of the eye socket, shaping a plastic shell, painting the iris, and then fitting the ocular prostheses. Prefabricated ocular prostheses with different colored iris are also available. An ocularist may select the stock eye that is most closely matched to patient's iris color. However, due to better adaptation, comfort, and aesthetics, custom-made ocular prostheses are more accepted. In addition to creating the prosthetic eye, an ocularist shows the patient how to care for and handle the prosthesis.

Pache & Son circa 1900

Ocularists may develop their skills from various background disciplines, including medical, optometry, dental, nursing, biology, medical arts and illustration.

== Notable Ocularists ==
- Thomas Pache (1841-1918) Ocularist, glassblower and owner of Pache & Son, which spanned over a century.
- Ambroise Paré (1510-1590) French Military Surgeon and often considered the "father of ocular prosthesis".
- Auguste Boissonneau French Ocularist who gained fame for his thin enamel shells.
- Ludwig Müller-Uri (1811-1888) Helped pioneer modern glass ocular prosthetics.

== United States ==
Training and registration varies significantly worldwide.

There is not a specific training program of study to call a person an "ocularist" at the present time. Therefore, this field is practiced in many places by maxillofacial prosthodontists, dentists who have undergone 3–4 years of specialty residency training. There are also technicians who practice in this field after learning how to make artificial eyes through an apprenticeship program. There are also people who use the title of ocularist who have had no formal training in the fitting, manufacture, and delivery of ocular prosthetics.

The American Society of Ocularists teaches the fitting, fabrication, insertion, and maintenance of artificial eyes.

The National Examining Board of Ocularists (NEBO) is the certifying agency for ocularists in North America. NEBO designates the title of Board Certified Ocularist for Ocularists that have passed the NEBO examination. Those ocularists that have achieved and maintained certification by NEBO are designated as Board Certified Ocularists (BCO). An ocularist with this title has also pledged to make custom prosthetics as opposed to stock prosthetics.

Traditionally, ocularists hand paint the iris and sclera of an artificial eye. In the 1990s some ocularists began to use digital printing to enhance the natural appearance of the artificial eye. Digital artificial eyes are only made in a few ocularist offices.

== See also ==
- Craniofacial prosthesis
- Anaplastology
