= Charles Henry-Pache =

Swiss pastelist (1749–1820)

Charles Henry Pache
- Born: 1746; Morges, Vaud, Switzerland
- Died: 1820 (Aged 74); Morges, Vaud, Switzerland
- Occupations: Pastel Manufacturer & Supplier, Artist
- Known for: Pastelist , Supplier to The Royal Society of Arts
- Awards: Royal Society of Arts Bounty

Charles Henry Pache (1749–1820) was a Swiss Pastelist manufacturer and supplier who was born in Morges, in the Canton of Vaud in Switzerland.

== Life ==
Pache was of Swiss-Huguenot ancestry, and part of the prominent Pache Family, which included senior civic/military officers, artisans and merchants who'd operated around the Lausanne area since the 17th Century.

Pache Swiss Crayons 1874

His uncle Jean-Louis (Lewis) Pache had operated a successful Hosiers, hatters, glovers and Swiss crayon vendors business from 1756 to 1765 in Soho, London. They provided services to the British Aristocracy, and in particular Augusta Leigh

Charles had been a partner of the celebrated pastel-maker Bernard-Augustin Stoupan in Lausanne before he came to London sometime in 1772, the year before his uncle passed away. It was at this time when he wrote to the Royal Society of Arts, presenting them with boxes of his own Swiss pastels for their approval in person.

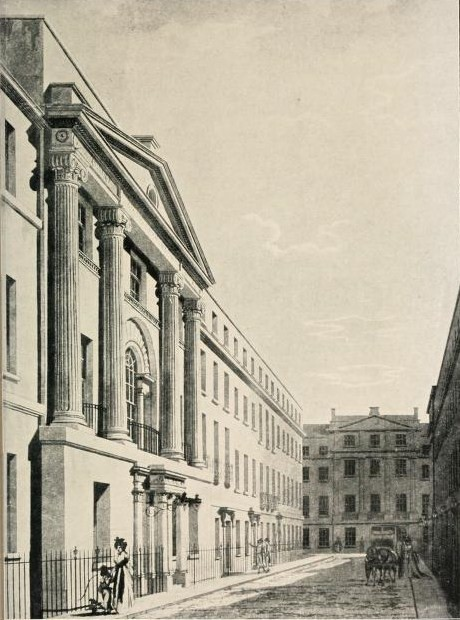
The Society of Arts in the 18th Century

The Society sought advice from its "most eminent artists" who used pastels in their work. These included notable artists Jean-Étienne Liotard, John Russell and John Milbourn. It was Liotard who issued a certificate stating that they were "as good as Stoupan's, and the Brown's even more Beautiful" and that the overall consistency rivaled or even surpassed the famed Swiss imports.

Soon after, Pache began advertising that he had set up a business of his own, mentioning that he had now received a significant bounty from the Society for the Encouragement of Arts, Manufactures and Commerce (Royal Society of Arts) for successfully establishing the manufacture of high-end Swiss-style artists' pastels. The bounty amount was 20 guineas in order to help further secure the manufacturing of these quality pastels in England.

He married Marie-Louise Oltramar, who was part of a prominent Italian Protestant family that settled in Geneva in the 16th century, at St James', Piccadilly in November 1775.

His business was located on Oxendon Street, next to the fashionable Leicester Square, in the City of Westminster. Meaning it was situated close to the Royal Society of Arts Headquarters.

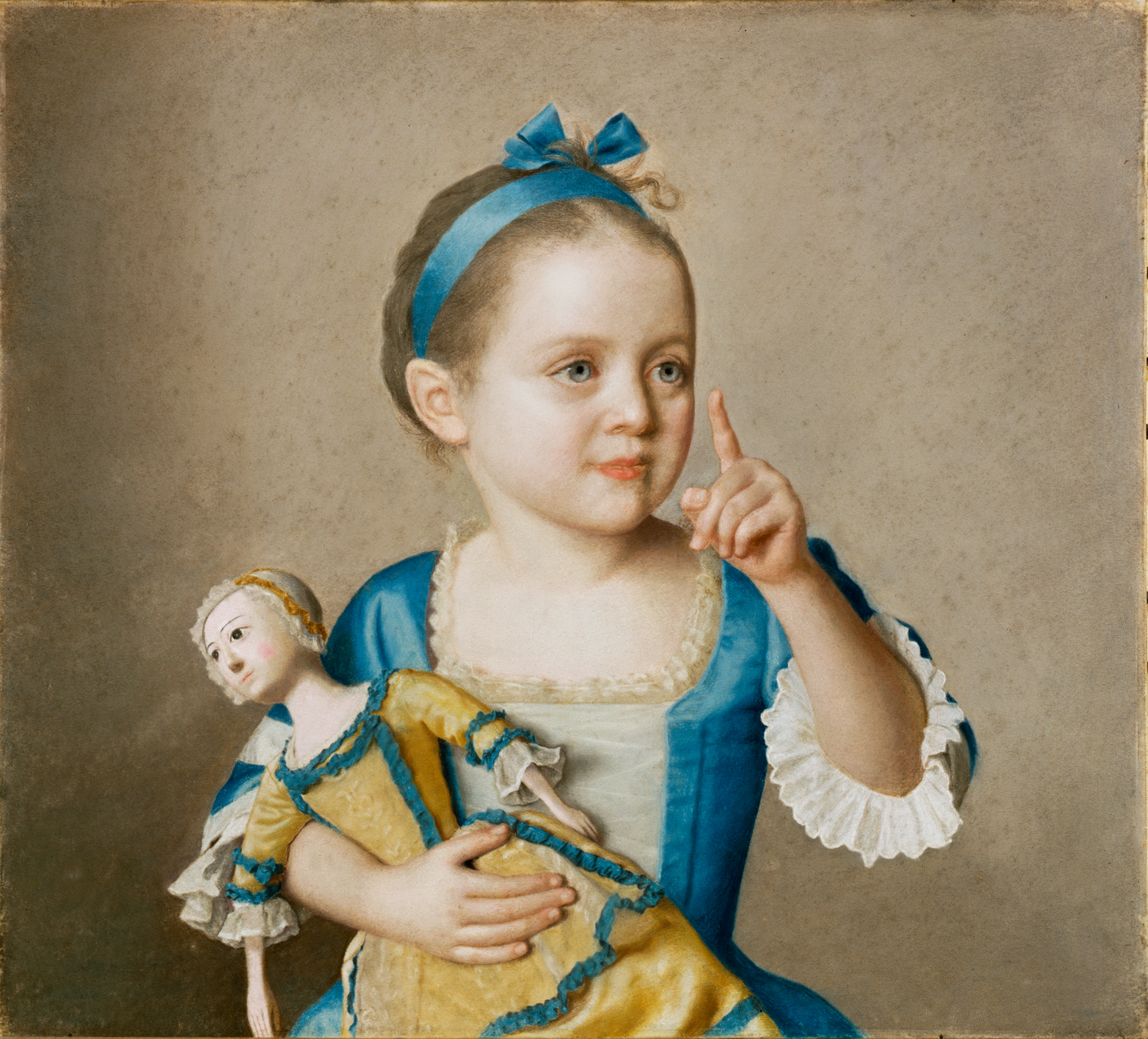
Liotard using Swiss pastel - Marianne Liotard Holding a Doll, c.1775

A letter dated 7 November 1775 from a Swiss Intellectual and Fellow of the Royal Society Rodolph Valltravers (1723–c. 1815) writing to artist John Grimston informs us about Pache's Pastels, as well as him being an artist:

I hear with satisfaction, that Pache's Colors are come safe to hand at last, and have pleased. I thank you for the Encouragement you give to this young Swiss artiste. He is still unknown. The Colormen, who buy his Colors, and sell them as genuine, at the same Price, or cheaper than himself, mix them with their own bad colors, and hurt him much.

== Death ==
It was most likely because of this issue of the competition undermining his supplies he returned to Switzerland, sometime towards the end of the 18th century. Two of his children later married there, in his hometown of Morges.

A Charles Henri Pache was buried in Morges in 1820, aged 74.
