= Burgher (social class) =

Title for privileged citizens in medieval European towns

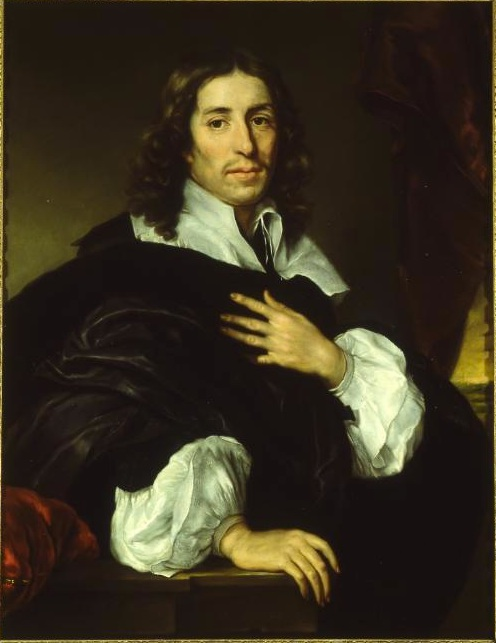
Portrait of a Burgher (c. 1660) by Lucas Franchoys the Younger

The burgher class was a social class consisting of municipal residents (Latin: cives), that is, free persons subject to municipal law, formed in the Middle Ages. These free persons were subject to city law, medieval town privileges, a municipal charter, or German town law. After the fall of the estate monarchy, this social class, more often referred to as the bourgeoisie (from French: bourgeoisie – city residents) and less often as the burgher class, generally refers to town or city inhabitants, in contemporary use townsfolk or citizenry.

Gradually, within the burgher class, a wealthy stratum emerged, engaged in banking and overseas trade, organized in guilds and trading companies. The rise of this stratum is associated with the beginning of capitalism.

== Admission ==
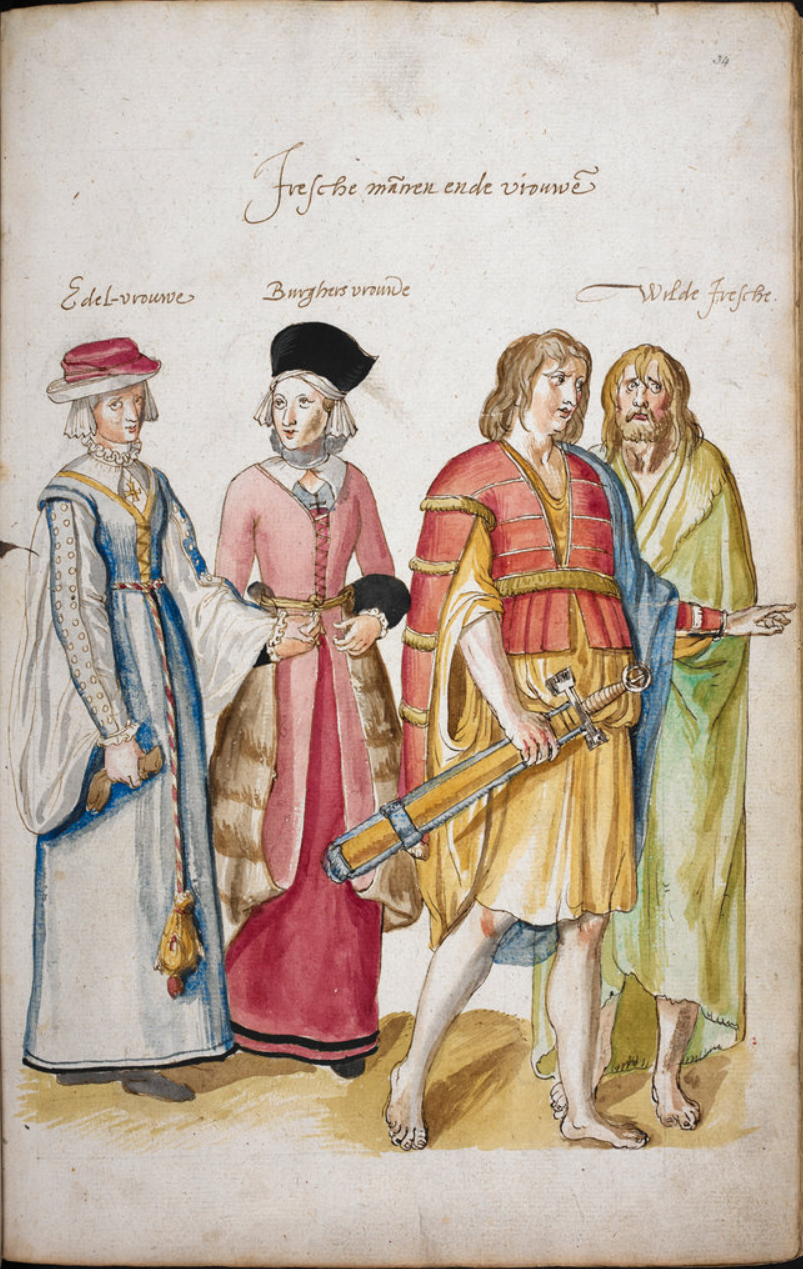
Illustration by Lucas de Heere, created between 1573 and 1575, titled "Men and Women of Ireland: A Noblewoman, a Burgher's Wife, and Two Wild Irishmen."

The burgher class formed in the 13th century in connection with the emergence of medieval towns governed by separate laws. Burghers obtained self-governing rights and other privileges from feudal rulers. A burgher was exclusively a person possessing municipal rights (and not every person living in the town). To meet the conditions for acquiring these rights, one first had to obtain municipal citizenship under specific legal conditions regulated in municipal bylaws, town council ordinances, and sometimes very strict edicts.

Entry into burgher status varied from country to country and city to city. In Hungary, proof of ownership of property in a town was a condition for acceptance as a burgher.

== Privileges ==
In medieval Switzerland, for instance, crimes against burghers were considered crimes against the entire city community. If a burgher was assassinated, the other burghers had the right to bring the alleged murderer to trial by judicial combat. This practice was part of the broader Germanic legal tradition of trial by combat, which was used to settle disputes in the absence of witnesses or confessions.

In the Netherlands, burghers were often exempted from corvée or unpaid statute labour, a privilege that was later extended to the Dutch East Indies. Only burghers could join the city guard (Schutterij) in Amsterdam because guardsmen had to purchase their own expensive equipment. Membership in the guard was often a stepping stone to political positions.

== By region ==
=== Eastern Europe ===
In Polish–Lithuanian Commonwealth and Russian Empire this class was referred to as mieszczanstwo (Russian: мещанство)

=== Specific cities ===
- Bourgeois of Brussels
- Bourgeois of Paris
- Bourgeoisie of Geneva
- Hanseaten
- Tribes of Galway
