= James Hobler =

James Hobler may refer to:

- Jean Francois Hobler, Swiss-born clockmaker who used this name
- James Francis Helvetius Hobler, chief clerk to the Lord Mayors of London, late 18th to mid 19th century
