= Forward-Morges HC =

- City: Morges, Switzerland
- Founded: 1956
- Operated: 1956–Present
- Home arena: Patinoire des Eaux-Minérales (capacity 2,400)
- Colours

Franchise history
- 1956–1961: HC Chigny-Vuffiens
- 1961–2016: Forward-Morges HC
- 2016–2022: HC Star Forward
- 2022–Present: Forward-Morges HC

Forward-Morges HC is an ice hockey club from Morges, Switzerland. They currently play amateur men's hockey, focusing as a strong women's and junior development club. Forward Morges formerly played professionally in the National League B, the second level of Swiss ice hockey, but withdrew during the 2005–06 season due to financial problems. Their first team was later merged and currently plays as HC Star Forward in the Swiss 1. Liga. then, the team changed their name back to Forward-Morges HC in 2022.

== History ==
The official foundation of the association took place on 3 March 1956 under the name HC Chigny-Vufflens . All 18 founding members approved the statutes of the association. Without having an ice rink, the members initially trained on ponds or the ice rink Cheseaux in Saint-Cergue . In 1957, the club completed its first official game in the 3rd league (fifth division), which ended with a 6: 9 defeat. In 1961, a committee began to develop plans for an ice rink in Morges. The ice rink was finally realized under the name Patinoire des Eaux-Minérales, in the same year the club was renamed and henceforth as Forward Hockey Clubcontinued. The inauguration of the new home venue took place in December 1962. In the 1962–63 season, the Forward HC arrived on the rise playoffs of the third division in the relegation in which they beat La Chaux-de-Fonds III. In the following season the club succeeded in the march in the first division. In 1970, the club rose to the National League B, in the Forward Morges was active until relegation in 1978.

The rising cost of the ice rink forced the club to act in the late 1970s; Finally, the city Morges became the owner of the plant. In April 1984, the municipal council granted a loan of CHF 240,000 for the study of a new rink. In 1990 the project was started. The official opening of the ice rink was on 26 September 1992. On 8 January 1993, the club played against the second division St. Croix his first home game, which ended in a 3–7 defeat. In 2004, the club rose for the second time in its history in the National League B, in which they played in the 2004–05 and 2005–06 seasons, but had to immediately withdraw for financial reasons from the NLB on December 8, 2005.

With their first team dissolved, Forward-Morges continued play through their second team, playing in the fourth-level Swiss 2. Liga, before being promoted to the 1. Liga following the 2010–11 season.

Reborn through their continuing junior program, Forward-Morges HC merged their professional men's team with Star Lausanne to form Star Forward in 2016. Star Forward were later included in the newly formed third tiered, MySports League for the 2017–18 season. They played two seasons before being relegated back to the Swiss Regio Leagues in 2019.

== Players ==
=== Notable alumni ===
- Olivier Anken
- Tomáš Kucharčík
- Martin Gélinas
- John Fust
- Sébastien Reuille
