= Helvetius =

Helvetius is the Roman name for a member of the Gallic tribe known as the Helvetii, or an inhabitant of their territory, Helvetia (now known as Switzerland). It may also refer to:

- a Roman cognomen, typically borne by those of Helvetian origin
- Helvidius, sometimes written Helvetius, author of a work written prior to 383 against the belief in the perpetual virginity of Mary
- Claude Adrien Helvétius (1715–1771), French philosopher and littérateur
  - Anne-Catherine de Ligniville, Madame Helvétius (1722–1800), wife of Claude who maintained a renowned salon in France
- James Francis Helvetius Hobler (1764–1844)
- John Frederick Helvetius (1625–1709), Dutch physician and alchemical writer of German extraction
- a character in The Second Maiden's Tragedy
- 6972 Helvetius, a main-belt asteroid, discovered in 1992

== See also ==
- Helvetia, the national personification of Switzerland
