= Knightsbridge Schools International Switzerland SA =

Coordinates: 46.5069609°N 6.4819665°E

Location
- Morges, Canton of Vaud; Switzerland

Information
- Type: Private International Day School
- Established: 2011
- Principal: Ms. Denise Coates
- Information: Tel +41 (0) 21 804 16 00; info@ksi-morges.com
- Website: ksi-morges.com

Knightsbridge Schools International Switzerland SA , also known as KSI Morges, in Morges, Switzerland, is a coeducational school with both local and international students aged 3–12. The school was previously known as Lake Leman International School. The school has closed.

The school follows the International Primary Curriculum.

KSI Morges is located in the town of Morges on the shores of Lake Geneva, in the region of "La Cote" which lies between Geneva and Lausanne. KSI Morges is one of the many international private schools that are in Lausanne and in the surrounding regions. The Campus is designed to accommodate children from Crèche through to Secondary School. It is newly designed and renovated, with outdoor recreational areas and an adjoining sports field.

== Academics ==
KSI Morges teaches children between the ages of 3 and 12 years of age, equivalent up to Swiss P4 / UK Year 5 / US Grade 6.

Children from ages 3–5 years old (Kindergarten) are taught the International Primary Curriculum for the Early Years (IPC), which uses play as an essential part of each child’s academic and social development and fits perfectly with the KSI ethos.

Children progressing onwards through Grades 1 to 5 (Primary School, ages 5–11) study the International Primary Curriculum (IPC) to encourage learning through a variety of engaging, stimulating activities based on themes encountered throughout the school year.

== Language programmes ==
There are strong English and French programmes at KSI Morges. While the principle language of instruction is English, French is taught at different levels up to a mother tongue standard, as appropriate. The individual approach of teaching at different levels allows for a thorough understanding of the local language, supporting the integration of all students into the local community.

== School life ==
KSI Morges has an active school life, outside of standard classroom activities. There’s an extensive range of extracurricular activities, with external specialists brought in to provide tuition and coaching in ballet, individual piano and violin lessons, martial arts and soccer training.

KSI Morges also has childcare and transport provisions, and an active Parents’ Network that supports the school community in many ways on a voluntary basis.

The primary aim of the Parents’ Network is to support new families settling into their new environment and to bring together families of diverse cultures and languages through different school activities and events. The members of the Parents' Network are actively involved in a variety of school activities and sports, as well as preparing for cultural events and festivals. They organise a range of events such as family picnics, the Easter Egg Hunt, and contribute significantly towards school initiatives such as its annual Book Week.
