= Marc Warnery =

Swiss plantation overseer in Dutch Suriname (1797–1836)

- Born: May 23, 1797; Morges, Switzerland
- Died: March 1, 1836 (aged 38) (before March); Suriname
- Occupations: Plantation overseer, director
- Known for: Letters documenting life on slave plantations in Suriname
- Parent(s): Jules Henri Warnery; Françoise Blanchenay
- Relatives: Louise Marie Augustine Warnery (sister)

Marc Warnery (23 May 1797 – before March 1836) was a Swiss Protestant plantation overseer and director who worked on slave plantations in Dutch Suriname. Born in Morges, Canton of Vaud, he is known for his detailed correspondence describing life on sugar and coffee plantations in the early 19th century, providing valuable historical insight into colonial society and the conditions of slavery in South America.

== Early life and family ==
Marc Warnery was born on 23 May 1797 in Morges, the son of Jules Henri Warnery, a lieutenant in French service who served as a judge and municipal councillor in Morges, and Françoise Blanchenay. His mother came from an old Morges family originally from Savoy, which had produced several judges, political leaders, and engineers in the Canton of Vaud. He was the younger brother of two sisters, one of whom died shortly after birth. Warnery remained unmarried throughout his life.

== Early business ventures ==
Active in commerce from his adolescence, Warnery first established himself in Versoix, where he participated in a food trading business, investing family capital. The venture quickly declined, and the Warnery family found themselves pursued by creditors. They were forced to sell part of their property in Tolochenaz (Riond-Bosson) and open a boarding house in Morges to maintain their finances.

== Career in Suriname ==
To restore the family's fortunes, Marc Warnery was sent to the Dutch colony of Suriname, where he arrived in 1823. He initially worked as an overseer (blanc-officier), then from 1826 as a director of several successive plantations. These establishments cultivated coffee, sugar cane, and sometimes cotton, exploiting numerous slaves. One of his employers, with whom he later had a falling out, was Alfred Jacques Henri Berthoud, a merchant from Neuchâtel established in Paramaribo who owned plantations.

Contrary to family hopes, Warnery did not make his fortune in Suriname. As evidenced by his correspondence, he moved from one estate to another, quarreling with the proprietors who employed him. He died in Suriname, probably of malaria, thirteen years after his arrival in the colony.

== Correspondence and historical significance ==
The letters Warnery sent to his family in Morges from Suriname constitute a very interesting source for studying plantation life and the structure of colonial society. The vast majority of the letters were addressed to his father and mother, with a few rare others to his sister Louise Marie Augustine Warnery and to a cousin. In these letters, he described in great detail life in the various plantations where he worked, the daily labor of slaves, its hardships, his own work as a supervisor, social relations with other European employees or with proprietors, festivals, and religious ceremonies.

Regarding religious matters, he noted the indifference of slaves to the evangelization efforts of the Moravian brothers. He also wrote extensively about his friend Berthoud, his success, and his advantageous marriage. Warnery's remarks on slave revolts, marronage (slave flight), and punishments inflicted by colonists are particularly valuable for historical research.

== Death and legacy ==
Warnery died in Suriname before March 1836, likely succumbing to malaria after spending thirteen years in the colony. His extensive correspondence, preserved in Swiss archives, provides crucial documentation of the daily realities of slavery and colonial life in early 19th-century Suriname, offering historians detailed insights into the social dynamics, working conditions, and cultural interactions within the plantation system.

== Published works ==
His letters were later published as:

Seul au milieu de 128 nègres. Un planteur vaudois en Guyane hollandaise au temps de l'esclavage. Lettres à ses parents, 1823-1835, edited by Thomas David, Olivier Pavillon, and Janick Marina Schaufelbuehl (2008).

== Bibliography ==
- Pavillon, Olivier: Des Suisses au cœur de la traite négrière. De Marseille à l'Île de France, d'Amsterdam aux Guyanes (1770-1840), 2017, pp. 126–134.
