= Jean-André Venel =

Swiss surgeon (1740–1791)

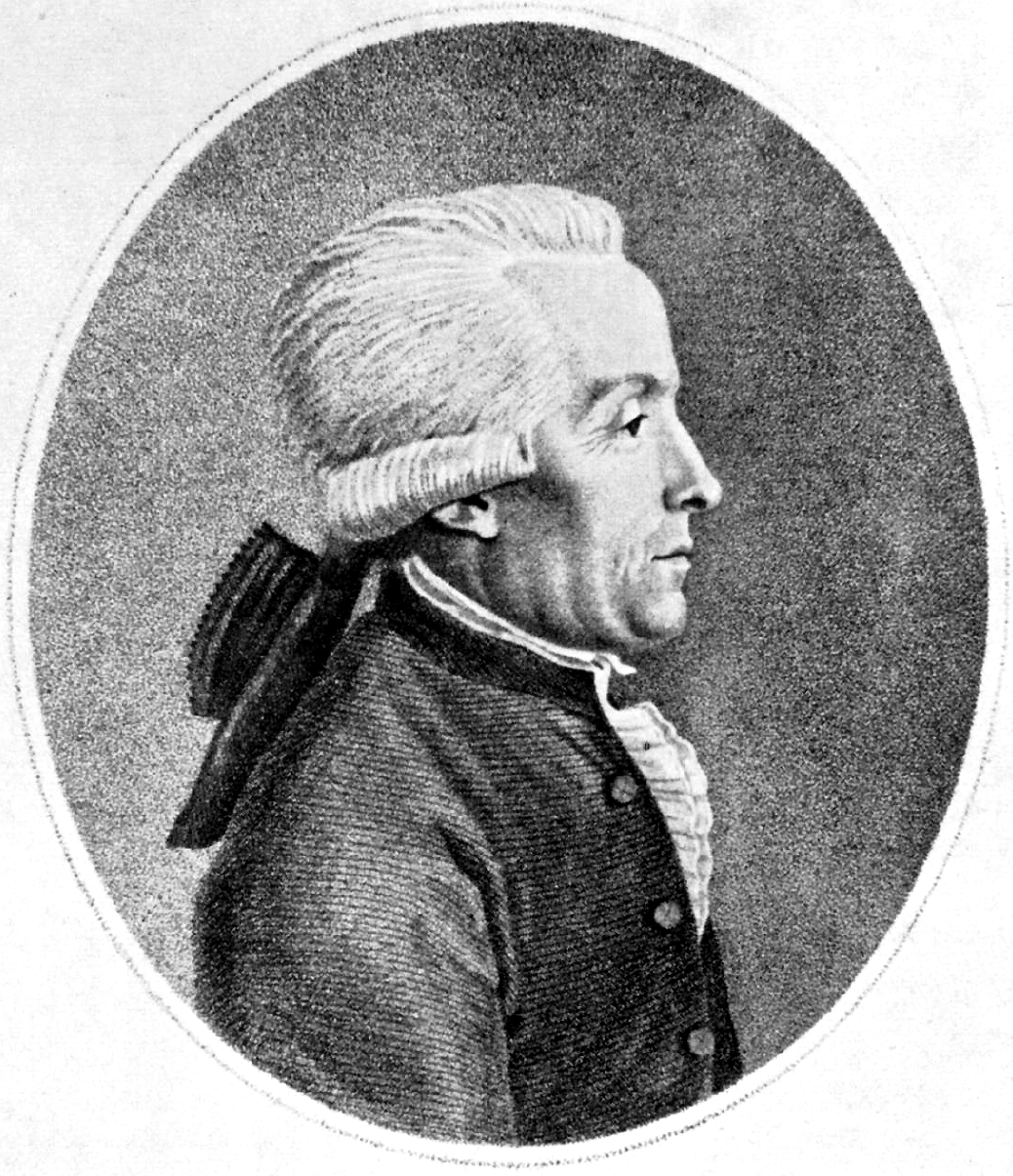
Portrait by Christoph Wilhelm Bock, 1790

Jean-André Venel (28 May 1740 – 9 March 1791) was a Swiss surgeon and a pioneer in the field of orthopedics.

== Biography ==
Venel was born on 28 May 1740 in Morges, Vaud, the son of Jean-François Venel, a barber surgeon and perruquier, and Françoise-Elizabeth Guex. He apprenticed as a surgeon with François-David Cabanis in Geneva. Venel continued his education in Montpellier, Paris and Strasbourg, and practiced in Vaud at Orbe and Yverdon; between 1770 and 1775 he was attached to the court of Count Stanisław Potocki.

In 1778, Venel opened in Yverdon the first school for midwives in Switzerland. He then turned to orthopedics, then very recent field, and in 1780 established the world's first orthopaedics clinic in Orbe. Nicolas Andry, in his work Orthopaedia, or the Art of Preventing and Correcting Deformities in Children (English edition 1741), had been the first to use the term "orthopaedia", but Venel is regarded by many as the "father of orthopaedics" because of his development of the practical applications.

== Works ==
- Nouveaux Secours Pour les Corps arrêtés Dans L’Oesophage; Ou Description De quatre Instrumens plus propres qu’aucun des anciens moyens à retirer ces Corps par la Bouche. (1769)
- Essai sur la santé et sur l’éducation médicinale des filles destinées au mariage. (1776)
