= List of mayors of Morges =

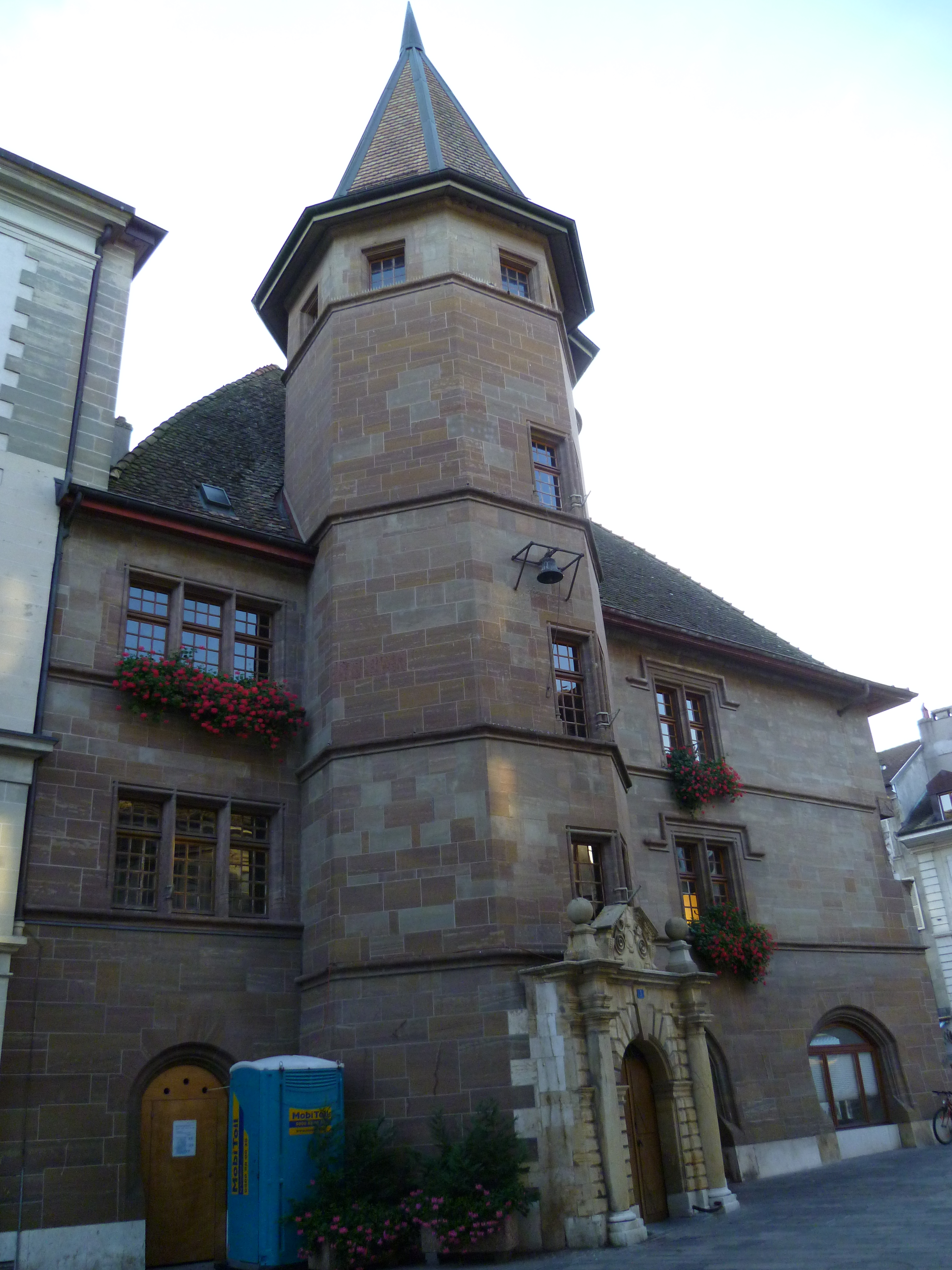
Hôtel-de-Ville de Morges

Coat of arms of Morges

This is a list of mayors of Morges, Vaud, Switzerland. The mayor (syndic) chairs the municipal council (Municipalité) of Morges.

Mayor (Syndic) of Morges
Term	Mayor	Lifespan	Party	Notes
1951–1967	Charles-Paul Serex	(1899–1978)		
	Xavier Salina			
1981–1994	Jean-Michel Pellegrino	(1937–2023)	PRD	
1994–2008	Éric Voruz	(born 1945)	PSS/SPS	
2008–2012	Nuria Gorrite	(born 1970)	PSS/SPS	
2012–2021	Vincent Jaques	(born 1975)	PSS/SPS	
2021–present	Mélanie Wyss	(born 1981)	PLR	
