= Francis Hobler Jnr =

British attorney and author

Francis Hobler Jnr (1796–1869) was a lawyer and writer. He was the son of James Francis Helvetius Hobler and Charlotte Elizabeth Claudon. Solicitor to the Licensed Victualler's Protection Society, he was also Secretary of the Numismatic Society of London and an active member of the Camden Society.

A resident of London, Francis Hobler was often referred to as Francis Hobler Jnr., given that his father, also a respected attorney, practised law under the name of Francis Hobler. During his career, Francis Hobler was mentioned frequently in the newspapers of the day. Some items that feature cases undertaken by Francis include (but are not limited to):

- 'Guildhall. Charge of Assault Against Sir W. White' in the News of the World, 6 April 1851, pg 7.
- 'Bow-Street' in the Daily News, 11 April 1851, page 7.
- 'Charge of Robbery Against Bank Clerk in London' in the Manchester Guardian, 15 April 1851, pg 7.
- 'Dononhue and Smith' in the Daily News, 16 June 1851, pg 7.
- 'Charge of Stealing Meat' in the News of the World, 7 September 1851, pg 7.
- 'Singular Case' in the News of the World, 19 October 1851, pg 5.
- 'Bankrupts to Surrender in Basinghall Street' in the News of the World, 23 November 1851, pg 8.
- 'Queen V. Henry Dimsdale and Others' in the News of the World, 28 November 1851, pg 7.
- 'Serious Charge Against A Publican' in the News of the World, 30 November 1851, pg 4.
- 'Charge of Fraud' in the News of the World, 30 November 1851, pg 7.
- 'Embellishment to the Amount of £500' in the News of the World, 14 December 1851, pg 5.
- 'Charge of Robbing an Employer' in the News of the World, 21 December 1851, pg 7.
- 'Yesterday's Police - Clerkenwell - Extensive Robbery of Plate - the ticket-of-leave system' in the Weekly Dispatch, 10 February 1856, pg 16.
- 'The Police Courts - Clerkenwell' in the Daily News, 11 February 1856, pg 7.

One his most famous cases was the trial of Benjamin Courvoisier in 1840. Benjamin along with theft charges was accused of the murder of Lord William Russell. Francis, as prosecutor, was successful and Benjamin was executed 6 July 1840.

== Works ==
As an author, Francis is best known for the following works:

- Hobler, Francis; Scrapbook relating to the visit of Queen Victoria to the City of London and her entertainment at Guildhall on Lord Mayor's Day 1837. Comprising printed reports of the Court of Common Council and its committees, interleaved with illustrations and printed and manuscript ephemera relating to the visit, including an autograph of the Queen. Compiled by Francis Hobler in 1838. (Source: Guildhall, 1v. Mss 7264 and 14392)
- Hobler, Francis; Records of Roman history from Cnaeus Pompeius to Tiberius Constantinus; John Bowyer Nichols and Sons, London 1860 [2 Vols] (Source: British Library, system number 011539649)
- Littleton, Sir Thomas; Familiar Exercises between an Attorney and his Articled Clerk, on the general principles of the laws of real property: being the first book of Coke upon Littleton, reduced to the form of questions. To which is added the original text (in English) and commentary by F. Hobler; London 1831 & 1847 (Source: British Library, system number 002185399)

== Family ==
Francis Hobler married Jane Boreham in July 1832 and died in March 1869. He is buried beside his father and mother on the west side of Highgate Cemetery, London.
