= John Francis Hobler =

Jean-François Hobler (Morges, February 1727 - Soho, London, 25 June 1794 ) was a Swiss-born, naturalised-English, watchmaker.

He migrated from Switzerland to London in the early to mid 18th century, John Francis Hobler (as he was commonly known) married Charlotte Elizabeth Claudon, circa 1753.

A watch and clock maker based in Soho Square, he worked with his son Jean Paul Hobler. The Hobler & Son workshop was based in Porter Street in Newport Market. Their watches were renowned for the blending of Huguenot silver techniques with traditional watchmaking. A popular middle class accessory, Hobler watches were also exported to America and the East Indies.

John Francis Hobler and wife Charlotte had four children of whom two were well known throughout London aristocracy. Youngest son, James Francis Helvetius Hobler was the Principal Clerk to the Lord Mayors of London for more than 50 years. James Francis Hobler is mentioned in the writings of Charles Dickens and George Augustus Sala. His eldest son, Jean Paul Hobler, was a respected alto tenor who gave grand performances at Westminster Abbey, the Drury Lane Theatre and Coleman's Theatre.

Jean Francis Hobler is buried at St Anne's Church, Soho, London, England.
