= Olivier Anken =

Swiss ice hockey player

- Born: 10 February 1957 (age 68); Morges, Switzerland
- Height: 5 ft 5 in (165 cm)
- Weight: 161 lb (73 kg; 11 st 7 lb)
- Position: Goaltender
- Caught: Left
- Played for: EHC Biel (NLA)
- National team: Switzerland
- NHL draft: Undrafted
- Playing career: 1974–1994

Olivier Anken (born 10 February 1957 in Morges, Switzerland) is a retired ice hockey player who played for EHC Biel in the Swiss National League A. He also represented the Switzerland men's national ice hockey team on several occasions in the World Championships and Olympics. He competed in the men's tournament at the 1988 Winter Olympics. He played his entire NLA career with EHC Biel, becoming the first player to have his jersey retired by the club. Current national team goalie Joren van Pottelberghe has decided to honour him by using Anken's likeness on his mask as a tribute.
