= Morges =

Place in Vaud, Switzerland

- Municipality
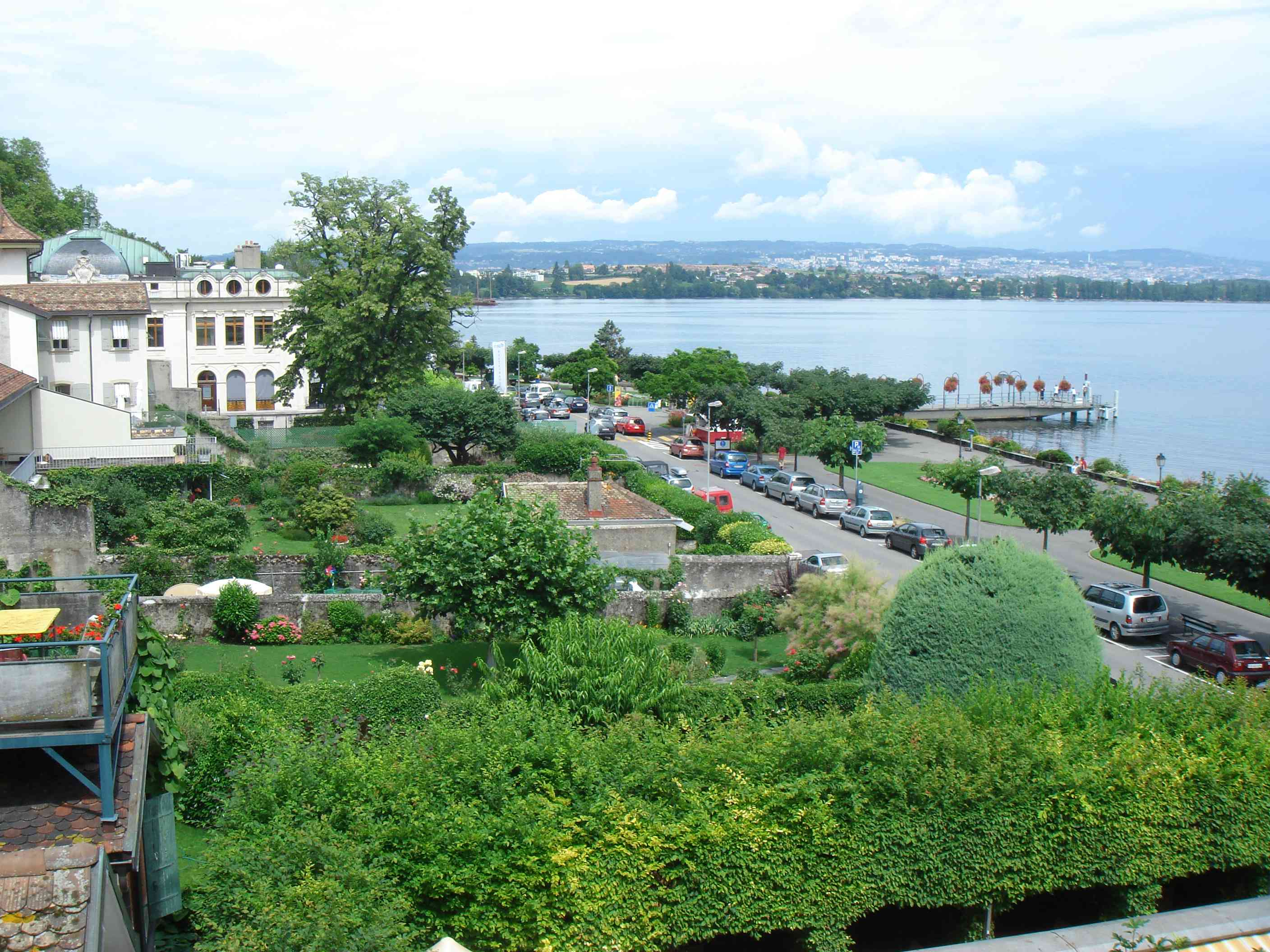
- Morges lakefront

- Flag Coat of arms
- Location of Morges
- Location within Switzerland Location within Canton of Vaud
- Coordinates: 46°31′N 06°30′E
- Country: Switzerland
- Canton: Vaud
- District: Morges

Government
  - Executive: Municipalité with 7 members
  - Mayor: Syndic (list); Mélanie Wyss (as of April 2021)
  - Parliament: Conseil communal

Area
  - Total: 3.9 km^{2} (1.5 sq mi)
- Elevation: 374 m (1,227 ft)

Population (2023)
  - Total: 17,755
  - Density: 4,600/km^{2} (12,000/sq mi)
- Time zone: UTC+01:00 (CET)
  - Summer (DST): UTC+02:00 (CEST)
- Postal code: 1110
- SFOS number: 5642
- ISO 3166 code: CH-VD
- Surrounded by: Chigny, Echichens, Lonay, Monnaz, Préverenges, Publier (FR-74), Tolochenaz, Vufflens-le-Château
- Twin towns: Vertou (France), Rochefort (Belgium)
- Website: www.morges.ch

Morges (French pronunciation: [mɔʁʒ]; Latin: Morgiis, plural, probably ablative, else dative; Arpitan: Môrges) is a municipality in the Swiss canton of Vaud and the seat of the district of Morges. It is located on Lake Geneva, west of Lausanne.

== History ==
Morges is first mentioned in 1288 as Morgia. It was known by its German name Morsee though that name is no longer used.

=== Prehistory ===
There were several prehistoric settlements along what is now the Morges lakefront. The largest and best known, Grande-Cité, was occupied in the late Bronze Age. One of the wooden objects at Grande-Cité has been dendrochronologically dated to 1031 BC. Many of the stilts and building structures have been preserved in situ. A dugout of oak was discovered near the settlement and in 1877 half of it was recovered and placed in the Musée d'histoire et d'art in Geneva.

About a hundred meters (yards) further north is the village of Vers-l'Église. The first settlement here dates back to the Neolithic, based on a layer of ceramic objects that date from between 2900 BC and 2700 BC. It remained occupied through the Late Bronze Age.

North-east of Grande-Cité is the third lake settlement, Les Roseaux, which comes from the Early Bronze Age. It is a rich site for artifacts including numerous edge strips for bronze axes and cups made of fine ceramics (of the Roseaux type). The arrangement of the stilts show the organization of the huts, which were oriented at right angles to the modern shore. Dendrochronological investigations of the stilts have determined that many of the houses were built between 1776 and 1600 BC. On top of the older settlement, a smaller Late Bronze Age settlement, dendrochronologically dated to 1055 BC, has been discovered.

The Bronze Age settlements were abandoned and the region was sparsely inhabited until the Gallo-Roman era when a villa and farms were built.

=== Medieval Morges ===
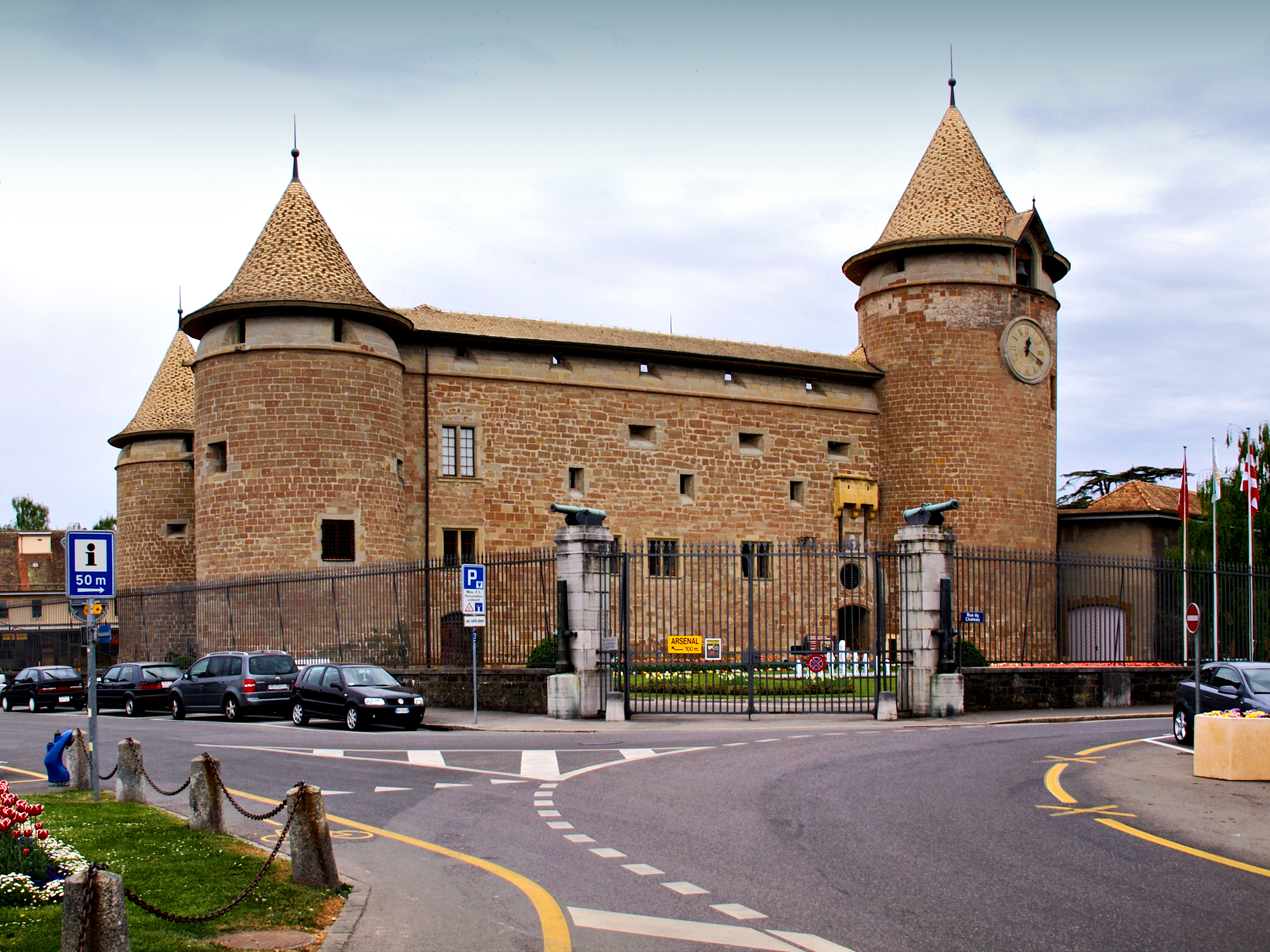
Morges Castle

In 1286, Louis of Savoy, founded a city in a pasture where a gallows has previously stood. A castle was built to protect the city. A town charter was granted in 1293. The new city grew at the expense of the county of Vufflens, the diocese of Lausanne and Romainmôtier Abbey, all of which lost property and rights to the new city. It quickly developed into an administrative and market center as well as a hub for transporting goods by land and sea.

During the Middle Ages, Morges was a seasonal residence of the court of Savoy and the seat of a bailiff. The city was ruled as a single fief, and the residents were taxed according to their frontage or the width of their property along the street. The city was laid out like many neighboring Zähringer towns. There were two 13–18 m (43–59 ft) wide longitudinal streets that could be used for markets and fairs. A third, parallel road was added due to the rapid expansion of Morges. A rectangular plaza was created for the weekly market. Due to the shape of the streets and the frontage tax, most of the plots are long and narrow. Most of the houses have courtyards for light and ventilation and some are also equipped with spiral staircases and arbors. The religious institutions and their related educational institutions and parish houses as well as a hospital and the college were in the northern half of the town near the church. Workshops developed in the southern half of the city, around the harbor and the marketplace. There were also the covered markets, the granary, the slaughterhouse and important inns in the southern half. The most significant of the inns was the Auberge de la Croix Blanche at Grande-Rue 70-72 which was given a late Gothic facade around 1550.

The castle in the south of the town square was built with a square floor plan and four round corner towers. It resembles the castle of Yverdon, which may have served as a model for Morges Castle. One of the round towers, larger than the others, served as the main tower. The raised courtyard was covered, during the Middle Ages, by casemates, which were first mentioned in 1340. On the lake side, outside the castle walls, there was a fortified kitchen. This kitchen, which was unique in Switzerland, was attached to the exterior of the castle walls. In 1363 the kitchen was rebuilt. Following the conquest of Vaud by Bern, the roof the kitchen became a platform for shooters. It was later converted into an observation deck.

The Syndics are first mentioned in Morges in 1375. The Town Hall was built around 1515-20 and is the oldest public building of its type in Vaud. The stair tower and monumental portal were built in 1682, while the facade was done in a late Gothic style. Prior to its construction, public meetings were held in the church, the hospital or in a hostel. Until the 16th century the town council consisted of two groups, the small Council with six or seven members, and a General Council (Conseil général). In 1514 the old councils were replaced with a twelve-member council and a twenty-four-member council. Both of these councils remained until the end of the Ancien Régime.

The municipality owned their own weights and measures, two community ovens, an infirmary (1340–1564) and a Hospital which was consecrated to St. Rochus (1518). The pillory was on the market place, the prison at the castle and the gallows were at Tolochenaz.

During the Middle Ages, the church belonged to the former parish church of Notre-Dame in Joules (now part of Echichens). The town chapel was first mentioned in 1306 without a patron saint and by 1490 it was consecrated to Notre-Dame. The chapel was on the Lausanne side of the ramparts and the unattached bell tower adjoined the city gate and served as part of the city defenses. In 1537 Tolochenaz and Morges formed a Reformed parish and the chapel was converted into a Reformed church. It was razed in 1769.

Outside the city walls, but near Morges, was the monastery of Colettaner, which was also known as the Franciscan abbey. It was founded in 1497-1500 and despite being close to Morges, was associated with Geneva. Swiss Confederation troops devastated it in 1530 and again in 1536. The ruins of the monastery were replaced with a cemetery.

=== Early Modern Morges ===
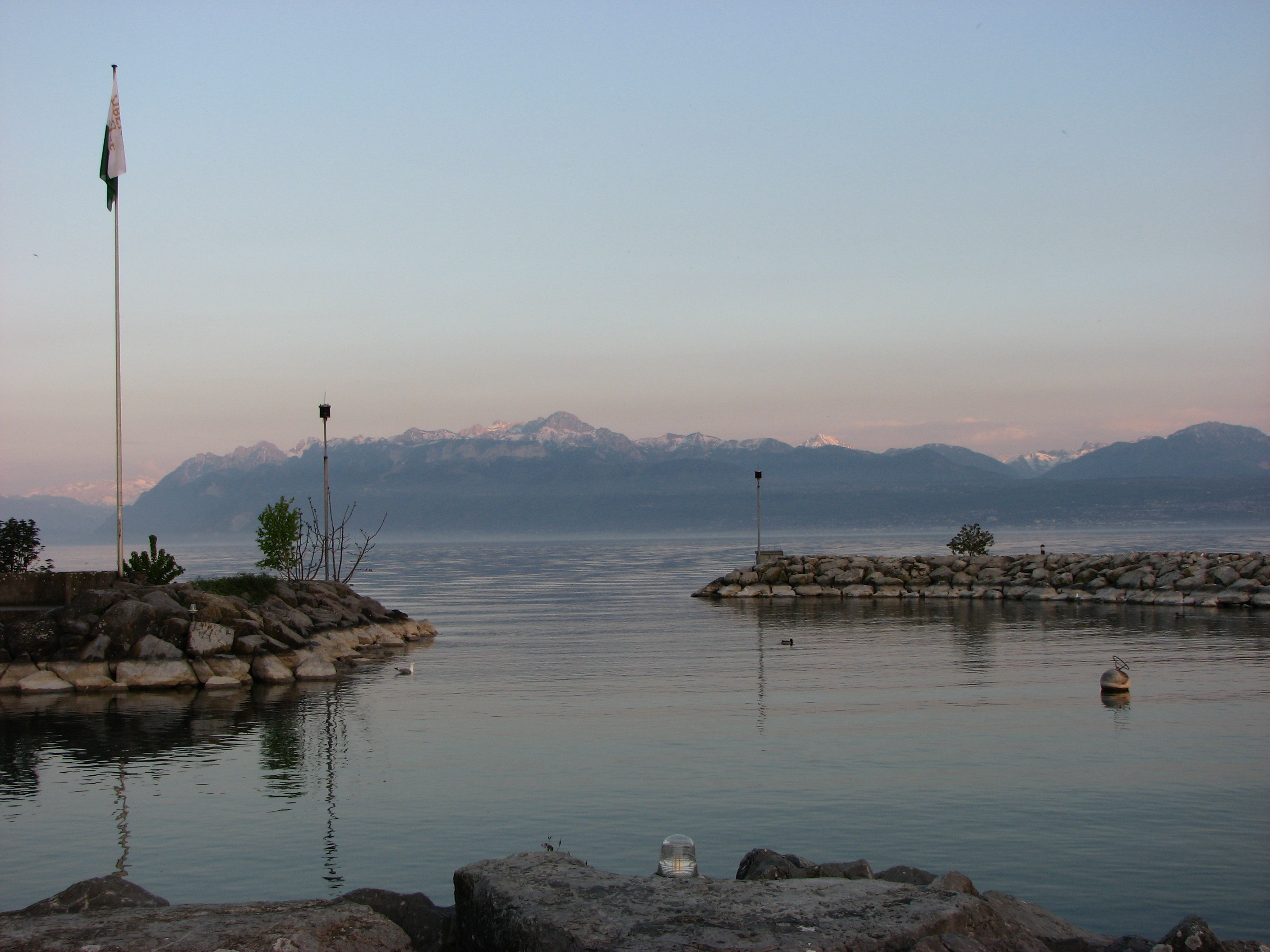
Morges harbor

The city and castle were plundered in 1475 and again in 1530. After the conquest of Vaud in 1536 by Bern, Morges became the center of a bailiwick in 1539. The castle was in deplorable condition. The new owners had the upper half of the fortifications rebuilt in the 1540s to suit the needs of artillery. Since Morges had not surrendered quickly enough to Bern, the city gates were demolished. The gate houses remained until 1769 and 1803, when they were finally destroyed.

During the early modern era, Morges became very prosperous. A number of individuals and families began to rise to prominence during this time, one notable family being the Pache Family, who's family members held Lordships, Civic and military positions for over 300 years.

Large civic and private buildings were built during this time. They include Bern's granary (1690–92) at the site of a formerly fortified private residence, the house at Grande-Rue 56 (which was built in 1560 and the arcaded courtyard was added in 1670) and the building at Grande-Rue 94 with its remarkable facade from 1682. A latin school (scola grammatical calis) was operating by the second half of the 15th century. In 1574 the Collège de Couvaloup, which was inspired by the academies of Geneva, Lausanne and Bern, opened in Morges. The new church was built in a French classicism style between 1769–76 and is one of the masterpieces of Reformed architecture in Switzerland. German language church services began in town starting in 1710.

Beginning in the late 18th century the areas outside the city walls were built up. A number of country estates (La Gottaz, La Prairie, La Gracieuse) and new suburbs developed along the arterial roads to Lausanne and Geneva. A small harbor is first mentioned in 1536 and shortly thereafter, regular boat service to Geneva began. In 1664 a simple pier was built out of poles, but it was too small to provide protection for the galleys that were on the lake. The Bernese government therefore decided to build a commercial and military port in Morges and not in Lausanne-Ouchy. The current port was built with two curved breakwaters between 1691–96 and in 1702 the customs house was finished. With the port, Morges became the starting point for several trade routes and became the site of a major transshipment point for goods such as salt, wine and grain.

During the early modern era, the local economy began to rely more on transportation and trade than on the production of goods. The shoemakers guild was very influential in the 16th and 17th centuries. They were replaced by tanners in the 18th and 19th centuries when they grew to be more important in the local economy. The largest socio-professional groups at the end of the Ancien Régime in 1798 were; (in order of importance) the rentiers or landlords, merchants, winemakers, farmers, shoemakers, tailors, carpenters and joiners.

=== Morges in the modern era ===
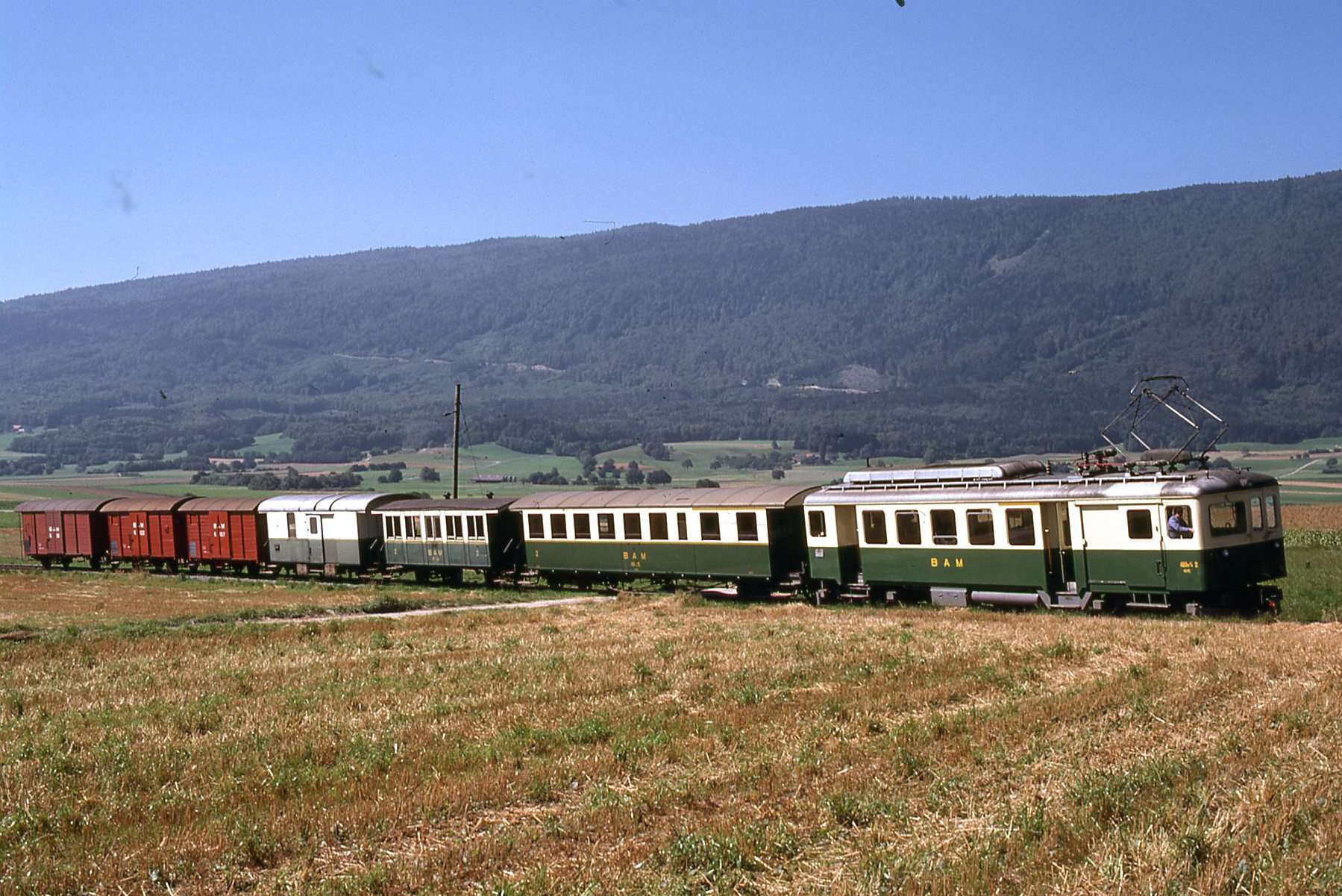
A train of the Bière-Apples-Morges line

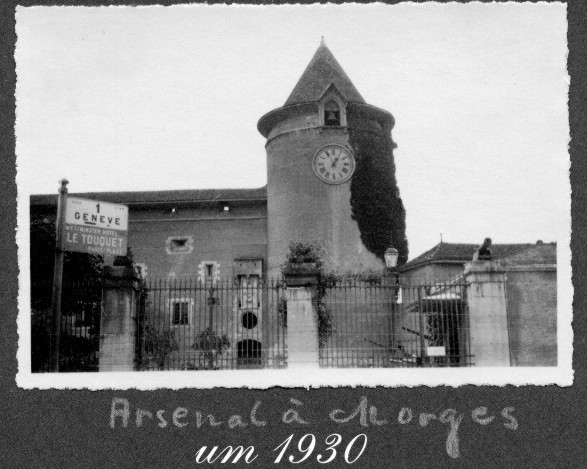
Morges Castle around 1930

The first railway line of the Canton connected Yverdon to Morges in 1855. The new station for this line, on the western outskirts of the city, caused a surge of development outside the city walls. The first line was followed in 1856 by the Morges-Lausanne route and in 1858, the Morges-Geneva line. In 1895, the Morges-Bière-Apples line was finished, which opened up the hinterland.

Morges grew into a regional economic, political and cultural center during the ancien régime. With the cultural development, it became a center for patriots (including Jean-Jacques Cart, Henri Monod and Jules Nicholas Muret) and the Vaudois revolution. After the 1798 French invasion Morges was a district capital.

During the second half of the 19th century, the city enjoyed an upturn in business thanks to the steamship port and the temporary connection from port to the railway (1855–62). In the port, the shipyard was located near the shipping company Compagnie générale de navigation sur le lac Léman (1858–89). The castle, which became the cantonal armory in 1803, was expanded in 1836–39 with some utility buildings and damaged in an explosion in 1871. Starting in 1925, it housed the Vaud Military Museum.

A Catholic church was built in 1844 and a chapel for German language services opened in 1891. In 1922 the cantonal Farming and Wine Production school was founded in Marcelin, the building is now the Agrilogie Marcelin.

In 1936, Polish politicians who opposed the Sanation Government gathered in the village to create the Front Morges, to call for democratization.

A number of companies dominated the economic life of the municipality in the 19th and 20th centuries: a gas factory (1867–1932), the transport company Friderici AG (1890), the biscuit factory Oulevay AG (1899–1992), the metal construction workshop Société industrielle de Lausanne (1907–79), the foundry Neeser AG (1947) and the pasta factory Gala (1988–2005). Between 1900 and 1940, the city extended further, with new villas and suburbs springing up. The first zoning plan of 1934 was followed by further plans in 1957 and 1970. Between 1961 and 1964 the highway was built, that divides the municipality into two parts. Since 2007, the municipality has been part of the agglomeration of Lausanne-Morges project. This project aims to create 30,000 jobs by 2020.

In September 2020, a man released from prison in July and who had been under investigation for "previous jihadist activity," chose a victim at random in Morges and killed him "to avenge the prophet."

== Geography ==
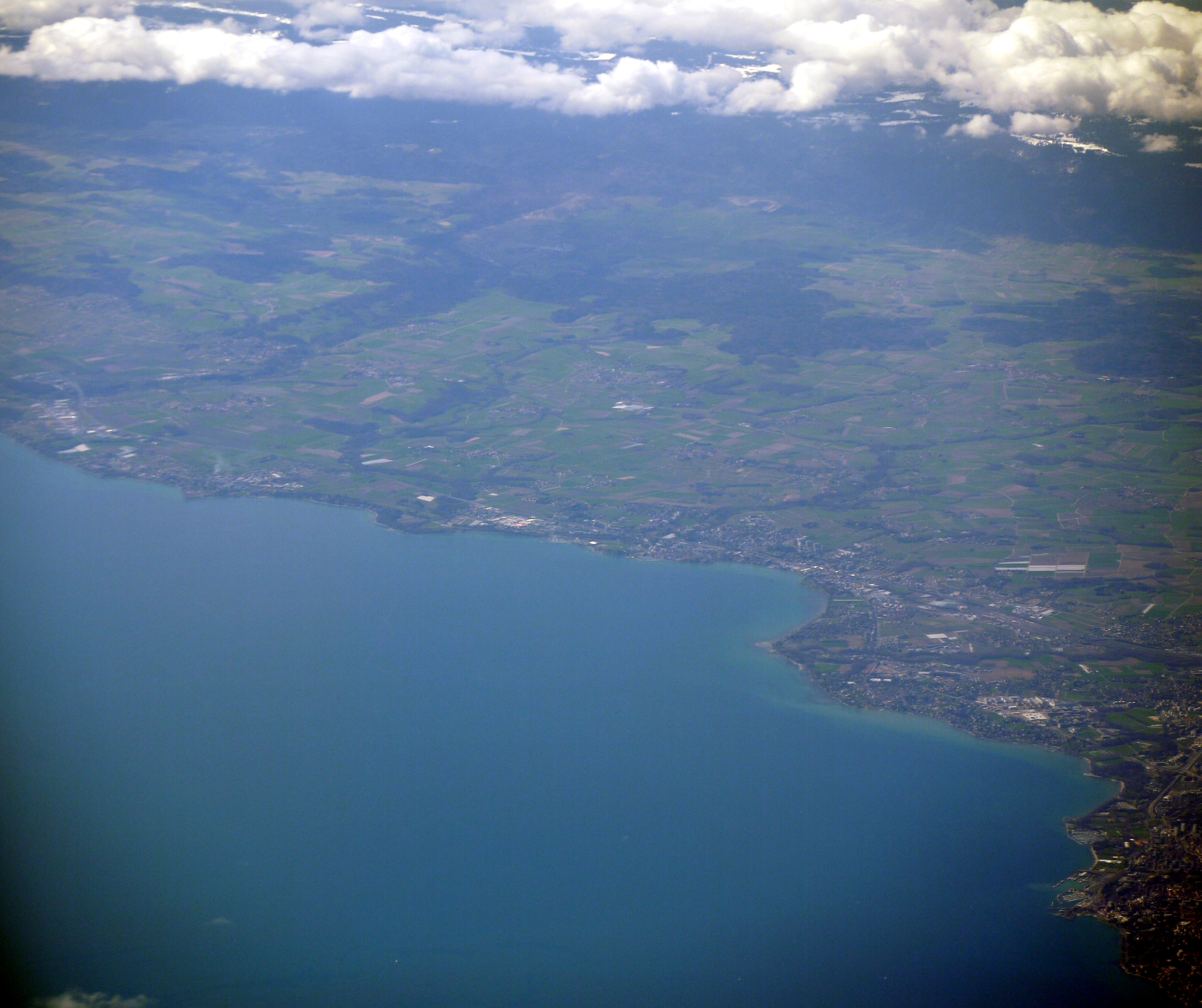
Aerial view of Morges

Aerial view (1964)

Morges has an area, as of 2009, of 3.9 square kilometers (1.5 mi^{2}). Of this area, 0.81 km^{2} (0.31 mi^{2}) or 21.0% is used for agricultural purposes, while 0.18 km^{2} (0.069 mi^{2}) or 4.7% is forested. Of the rest of the land, 2.83 km^{2} (1.09 mi^{2}) or 73.5% is settled (buildings or roads), 0.04 km^{2} (9.9 acres) or 1.0% is either rivers or lakes.

Of the built up area, industrial buildings made up 3.4% of the total area while housing and buildings made up 40.5% and transportation infrastructure made up 19.5%. while parks, green belts and sports fields made up 9.4%. Out of the forested land, 3.1% of the total land area is heavily forested and 1.6% is covered with orchards or small clusters of trees. Of the agricultural land, 6.8% is used for growing crops and 2.1% is pastures, while 12.2% is used for orchards or vine crops. Of the water in the municipality, 0.5% is in lakes and 0.5% is in rivers and streams.

The municipality was part of the old Morges District until it was dissolved on 31 August 2006, and Morges became part of the new district of Morges.

The municipality is the capital of the district. It is located 10 km (6.2 mi) south-west of Lausanne along a bay in Lake Geneva.

== Coat of arms ==
The blazon of the municipal coat of arms is Per fess Argent and Gules, two Bars wavy counterchanged.

It symbolizes the two rivers that bounded the town to the east, the Bief, and to the west the Morges river.

== Demographics ==
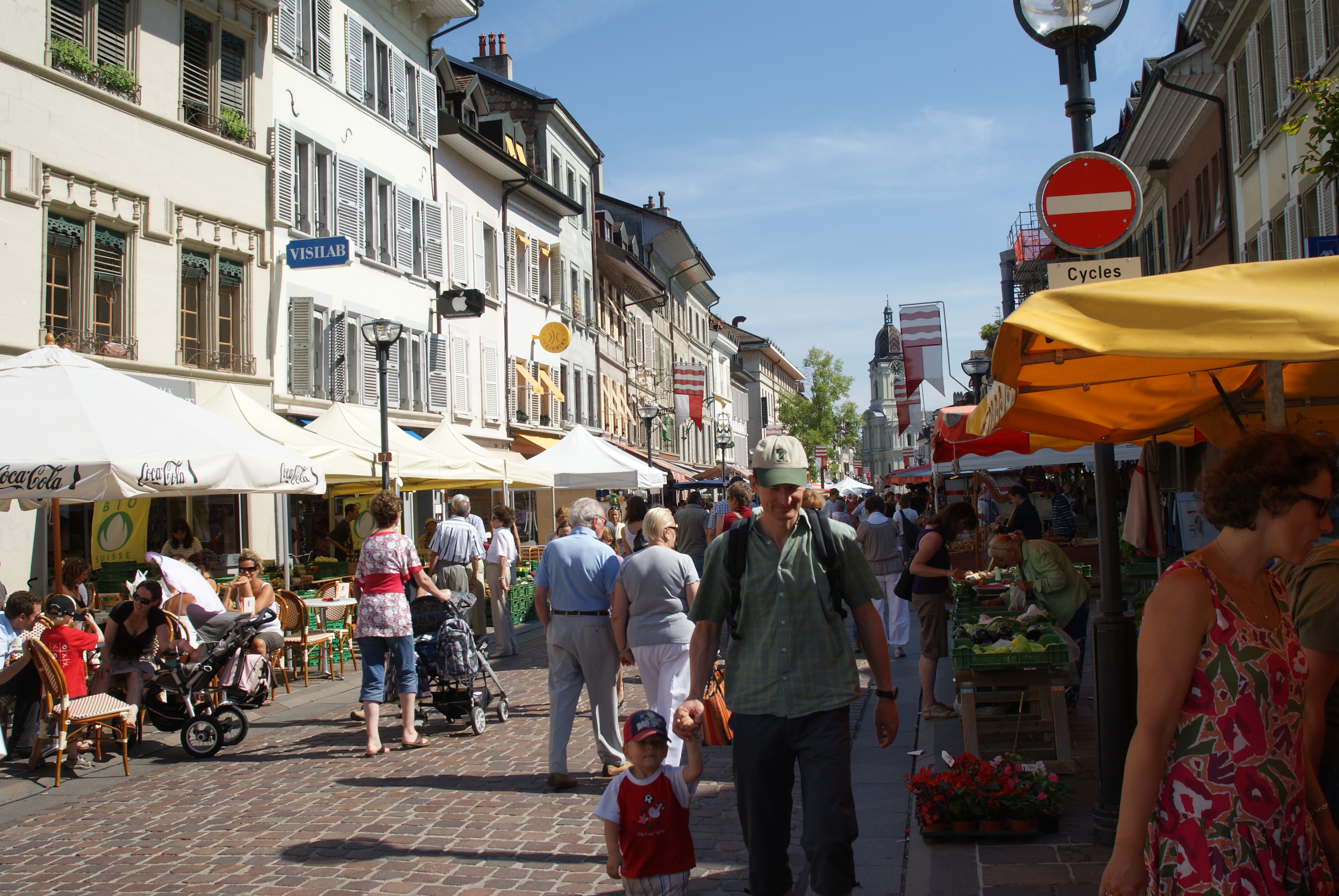
Market in Morges

Morges has a population (as of December 2020) of 16,101. As of 2008, 32.8% of the population are resident foreign nationals. Over the last 10 years (1999–2009) the population has changed at a rate of 4.3%. It has changed at a rate of 2.9% due to migration and at a rate of 1.5% due to births and deaths.

Most of the population (as of 2000) speaks French (11,654 or 82.3%), with German being second most common (601 or 4.2%) and Italian being third (566 or 4.0%). There are 2 people who speak Romansh.

Of the population in the municipality 3,030 or about 21.4% were born in Morges and lived there in 2000. There were 4,128 or 29.2% who were born in the same canton, while 2,474 or 17.5% were born somewhere else in Switzerland, and 4,085 or 28.9% were born outside of Switzerland.

In 2008 there were 115 live births to Swiss citizens and 57 births to non-Swiss citizens, and in same time span there were 129 deaths of Swiss citizens and 21 non-Swiss citizen deaths. Ignoring immigration and emigration, the population of Swiss citizens decreased by 14 while the foreign population increased by 36. There were 10 Swiss men and 13 Swiss women who emigrated from Switzerland. At the same time, there were 184 non-Swiss men and 199 non-Swiss women who immigrated from another country to Switzerland. The total Swiss population change in 2008 (from all sources, including moves across municipal borders) was a decrease of 109 and the non-Swiss population increased by 291 people. This represents a population growth rate of 1.3%.

The age distribution, as of 2009, in Morges is; 1,382 children or 9.6% of the population are between 0 and 9 years old and 1,475 teenagers or 10.2% are between 10 and 19. Of the adult population, 1,890 people or 13.1% of the population are between 20 and 29 years old. 2,178 people or 15.1% are between 30 and 39, 2,175 people or 15.1% are between 40 and 49, and 1,686 people or 11.7% are between 50 and 59. The senior population distribution is 1,599 people or 11.1% of the population are between 60 and 69 years old, 1,135 people or 7.9% are between 70 and 79, there are 710 people or 4.9% who are between 80 and 89, and there are 161 people or 1.1% who are 90 and older.

As of 2000, there were 5,695 people who were single and never married in the municipality. There were 6,496 married individuals, 940 widows or widowers and 1,023 individuals who are divorced.

As of 2000, there were 6,628 private households in the municipality, and an average of 2.1 persons per household. There were 2,727 households that consist of only one person and 242 households with five or more people. Out of a total of 6,747 households that answered this question, 40.4% were households made up of just one person and there were 27 adults who lived with their parents. Of the rest of the households, there are 1,742 married couples without children, 1,618 married couples with children. There were 395 single parents with a child or children. There were 119 households that were made up of unrelated people and 119 households that were made up of some sort of institution or another collective housing.

In 2000 there were 500 single family homes (or 37.6% of the total) out of a total of 1,330 inhabited buildings. There were 503 multi-family buildings (37.8%), along with 234 multi-purpose buildings that were mostly used for housing (17.6%) and 93 other use buildings (commercial or industrial) that also had some housing (7.0%). Of the single family homes 30 were built before 1919, while 34 were built between 1990 and 2000. The greatest number of single family homes (154) were built between 1946 and 1960. The most multi-family homes (107) were built between 1946 and 1960 and the next most (105) were built before 1919. There were 31 multi-family houses built between 1996 and 2000.

In 2000 there were 7,194 apartments in the municipality. The most common apartment size was 3 rooms of which there were 2,469. There were 680 single room apartments and 941 apartments with five or more rooms. Of these apartments, a total of 6,478 apartments (90.0% of the total) were permanently occupied, while 616 apartments (8.6%) were seasonally occupied and 100 apartments (1.4%) were empty. As of 2009, the construction rate of new housing units was 2.9 new units per 1000 residents. The vacancy rate for the municipality, in 2010, was 0.06%.

The historical population is given in the following chart:

== Heritage sites of national significance ==
It is home to the Les Roseaux and Stations de Morges prehistoric pile-dwelling (or stilt house) settlements that are part of the Prehistoric Pile dwellings around the Alps UNESCO World Heritage Site. The De La Croix Blanche Inn, the buildings at Grand-Rue 54 and Grand-Rue 94, Morges Castle along with the Military Museum of Vaud, the City Hall, the Bronze Age shore front settlement Les Roseaux/La Grande Cité and the Temple are listed as Swiss heritage site of national significance. The entire old city of Morges is part of the Inventory of Swiss Heritage Sites.

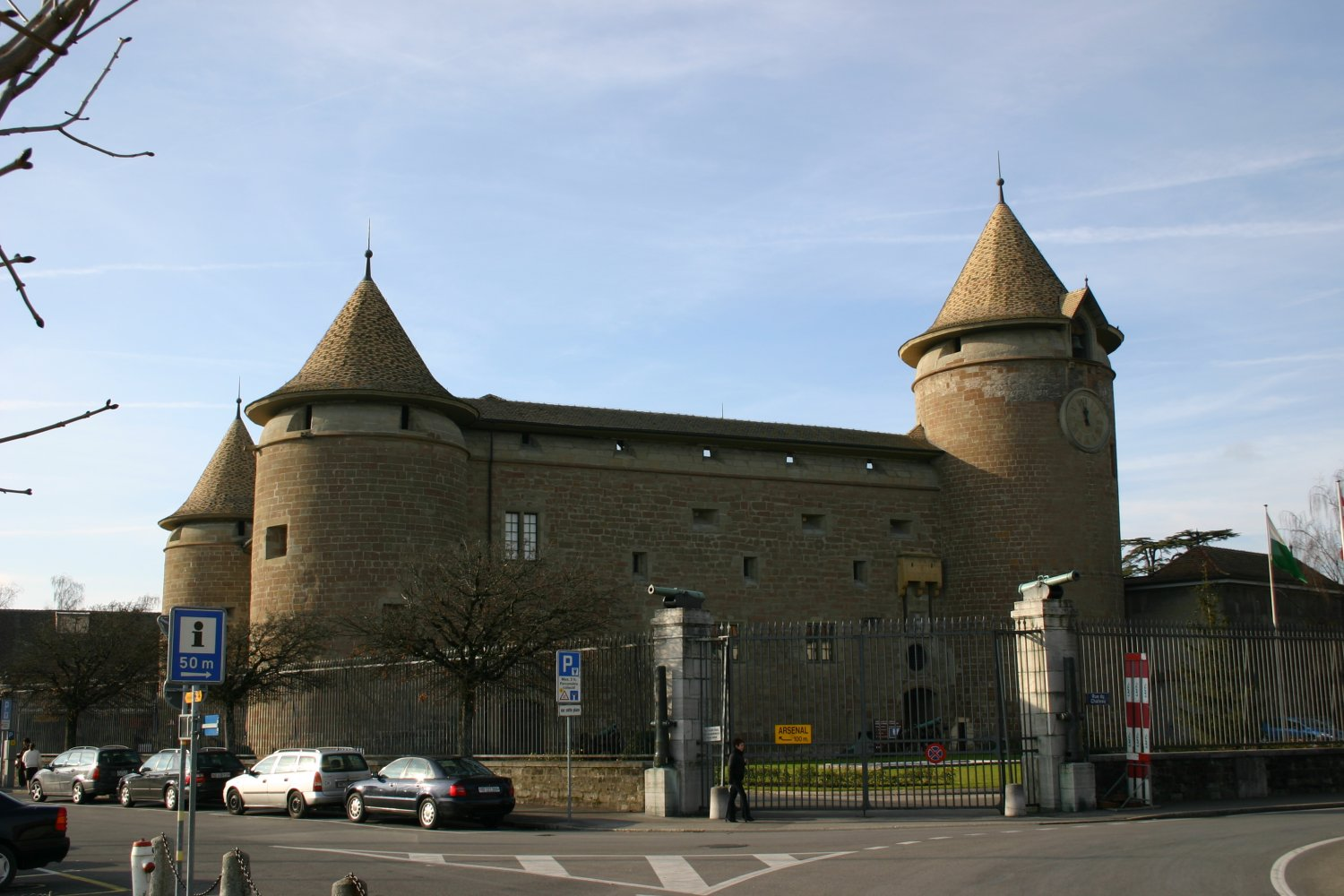
Morges Castle and Military Museum of Vaud

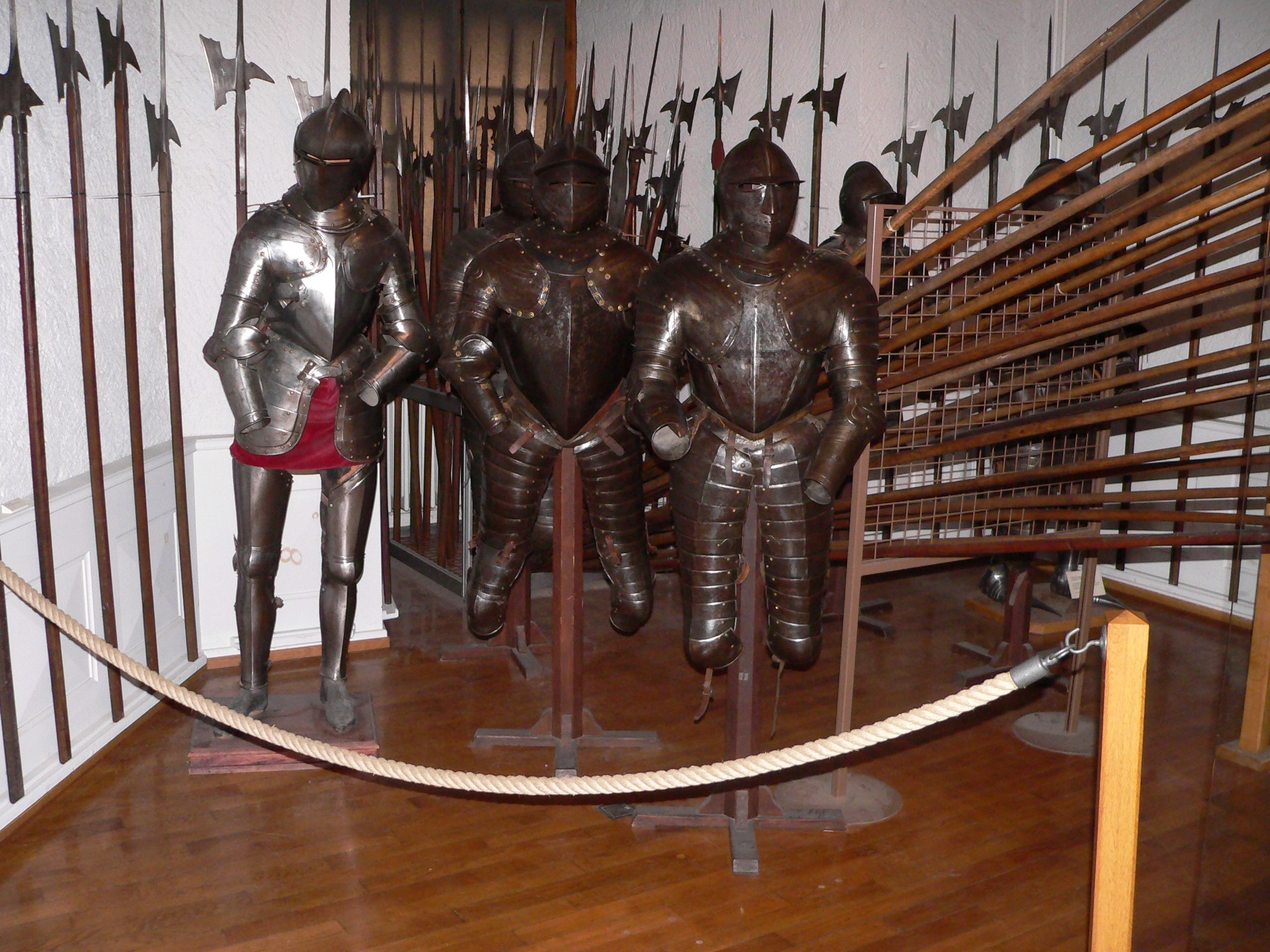
Weapons and armor from the Military Museum

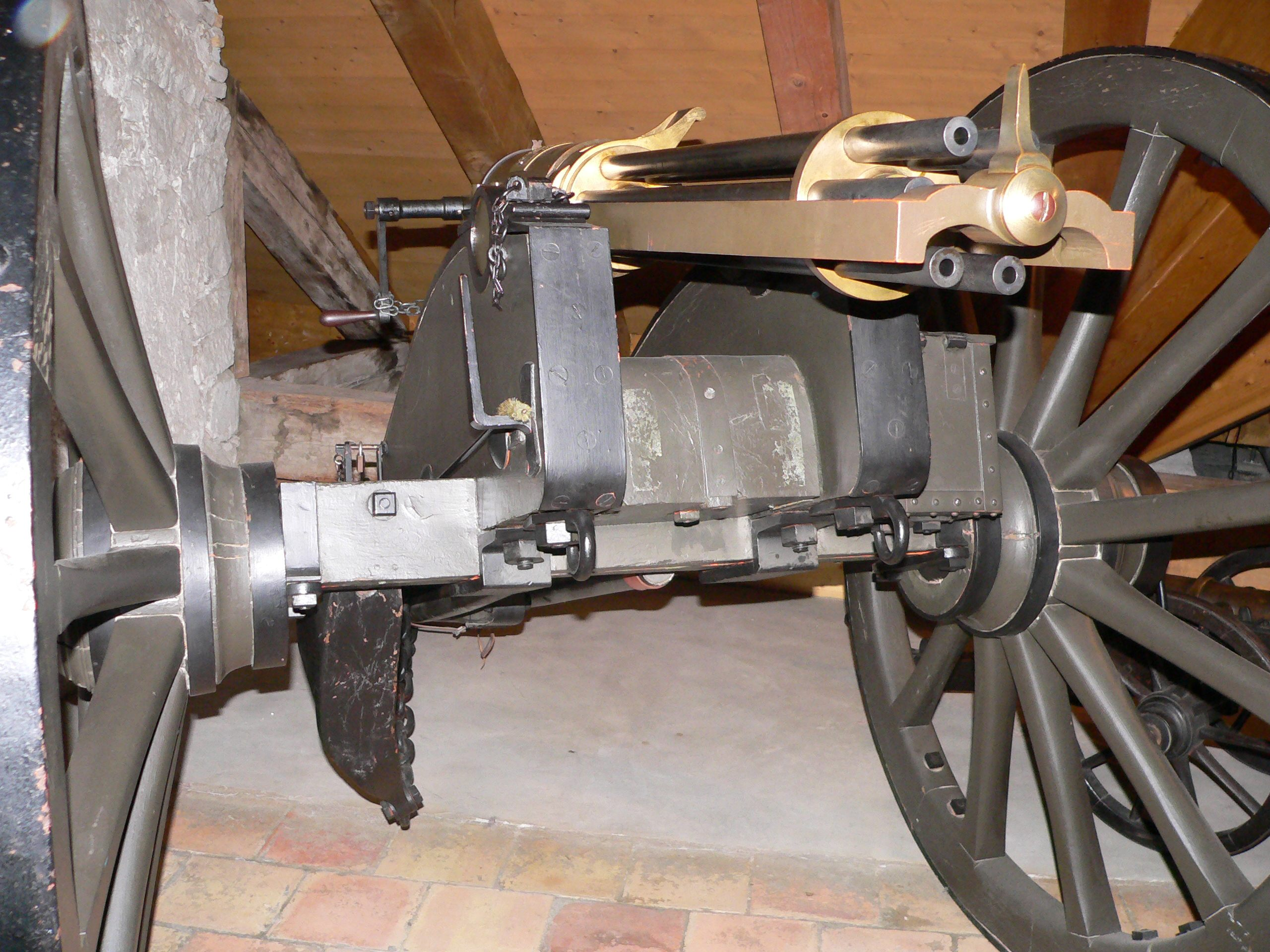
A Mitrailleuse gatling gun from the Military Museum

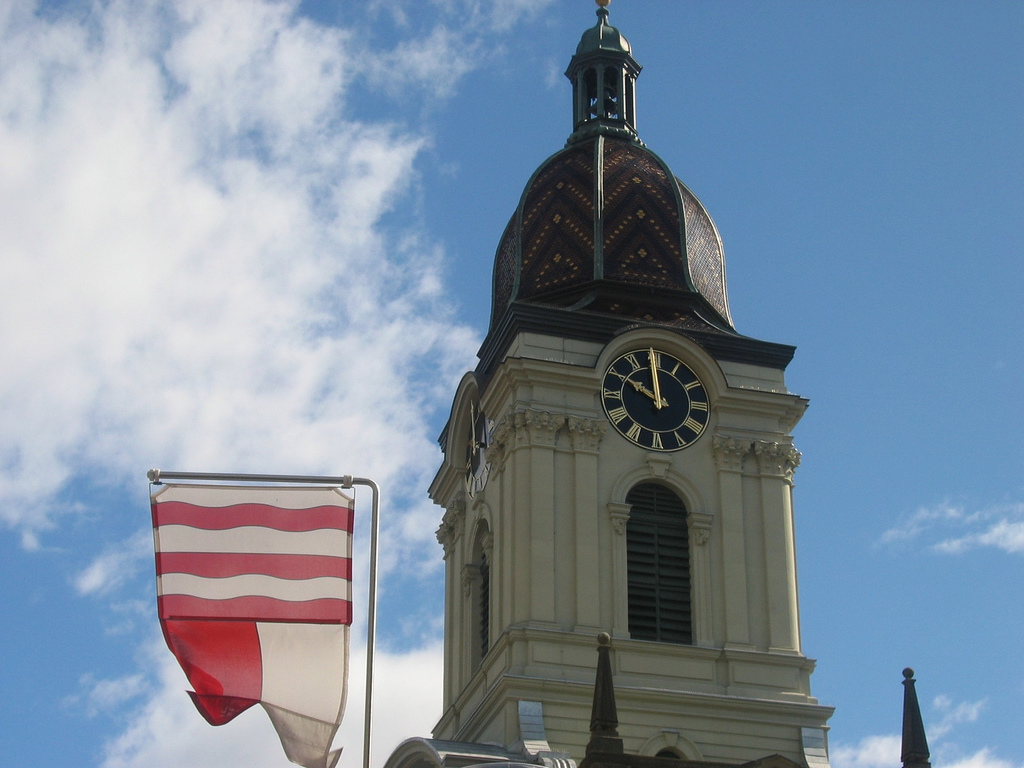
Temple

== Twin Town ==
Morges is twinned with:

- Vertou, France

== Politics ==
In the 2007 federal election the most popular party was the SP which received 27.87% of the vote. The next three most popular parties were the SVP (19.64%), the FDP (13.56%) and the Green Party (13.05%). In the federal election, a total of 3,649 votes were cast, and the voter turnout was 44.1%.

== Economy ==
As of 2010, Morges had an unemployment rate of 5.5%. As of 2008, there were 33 people employed in the primary economic sector and about 5 businesses involved in this sector. 978 people were employed in the secondary sector and there were 95 businesses in this sector. 7,391 people were employed in the tertiary sector, with 783 businesses in this sector. There were 7,229 residents of the municipality who were employed in some capacity, of which females made up 46.1% of the workforce.

In 2008 the total number of full-time equivalent jobs was 6,864. The number of jobs in the primary sector was 30, all of which were in agriculture. The number of jobs in the secondary sector was 914 of which 340 or (37.2%) were in manufacturing and 232 (25.4%) were in construction. The number of jobs in the tertiary sector was 5,920. In the tertiary sector; 1,597 or 27.0% were in wholesale or retail sales or the repair of motor vehicles, 227 or 3.8% were in the movement and storage of goods, 502 or 8.5% were in a hotel or restaurant, 236 or 4.0% were in the information industry, 328 or 5.5% were the insurance or financial industry, 474 or 8.0% were technical professionals or scientists, 556 or 9.4% were in education and 1,286 or 21.7% were in health care.

In 2000, there were 5,309 workers who commuted into the municipality and 4,531 workers who commuted away. The municipality is a net importer of workers, with about 1.2 workers entering the municipality for every one leaving. About 2.1% of the workforce coming into Morges are coming from outside Switzerland, while 0.0% of the locals commute out of Switzerland for work. Of the working population, 25.6% used public transportation to get to work, and 52.1% used a private car.

== Transport ==
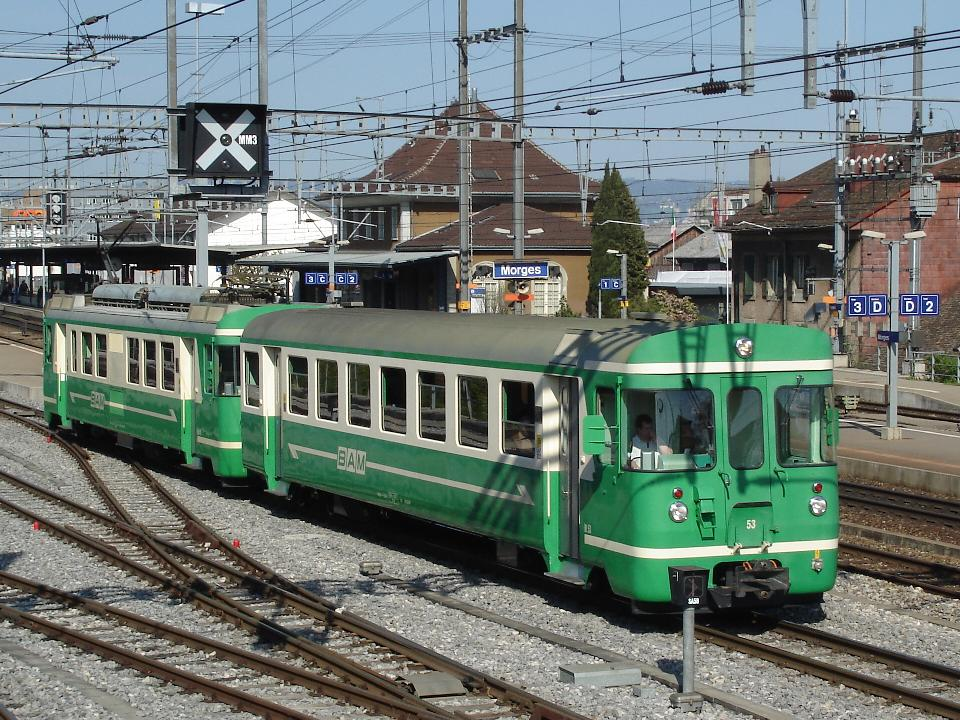
BAM local train at Morges in 2007

Morges has a railway station served by trains of the Swiss Federal Railways and the Bière–Apples–Morges railway (BAM), a Metre-gauge railway. Morges is served by the Lake Geneva boats of the CGN. The main east-west Swiss A1 motorway serves Morges (junctions 15 and 16).

== Religion ==
From the 2000 census, 5,439 or 38.4% belonged to the Swiss Reformed Church, while 4,925 or 34.8% were Roman Catholic, Of the rest of the population, there were 201 members of an Orthodox church (or about 1.42% of the population), there were nine individuals (or about 0.06% of the population) who belonged to the Christian Catholic Church, and there were 897 individuals (or about 6.34% of the population) who belonged to another Christian church. There were 16 individuals (or about 0.11% of the population) who were Jewish, and 412 (or about 2.91% of the population) who were Muslim. There were 23 individuals who were Buddhist, eight individuals who were Hindu and 30 individuals who belonged to another church. 1,854 (or about 13.10% of the population) belonged to no church, are agnostic or atheist, and 771 individuals (or about 5.45% of the population) did not answer the question.

== Education ==
In Morges about 4,991 or (35.3%) of the population have completed non-mandatory upper secondary education, and 2,165 or (15.3%) have completed additional higher education (either university or a Fachhochschule). Of the 2,165 who completed tertiary schooling, 47.1% were Swiss men, 30.0% were Swiss women, 13.2% were non-Swiss men and 9.7% were non-Swiss women.

In the 2009/2010 school year there were a total of 1,415 students in the Morges school district. In the Vaud cantonal school system, two years of non-obligatory pre-school are provided by the political districts. During the school year, the political district provided pre-school care for a total of 631 children of which 203 children (32.2%) received subsidized pre-school care. The canton's primary school program requires students to attend for four years. There were 716 students in the municipal primary school program. The obligatory lower secondary school program lasts for six years and there were 662 students in those schools. There were also 37 students who were home schooled or attended another non-traditional school.

Morges is home to the Musée militaire and the Musée Paderewski. In 2009 the Musée militaire was visited by 17,300 visitors (the average in previous years was 16,619). In 2009 the Musée Paderewski was visited by 200 visitors (the average in previous years was 333).

As of 2000, there were 1,293 students in Morges who came from another municipality, while 417 residents attended schools outside the municipality.

Morges is home to the Bibliothèque municipale de Morges library. The library has (as of 2008) 33,000 books or other media, and loaned out 109,679 items in the same year. It was open a total of 270 days with average of 26 hours per week during that year.

== Sport ==
The HC Forward-Morges plays in the Swiss 1. Liga. The YC Yens-Morges plays in the Swiss Unihockey Competition.

== Notable people ==
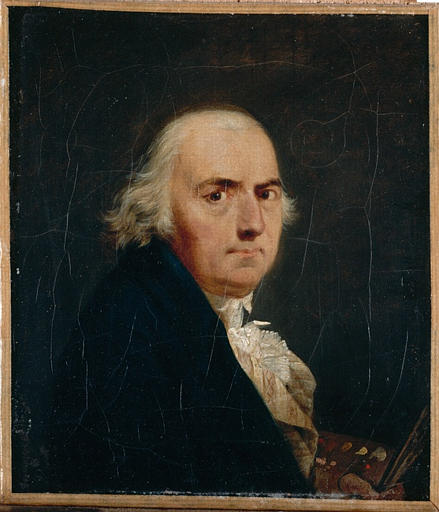
Jean-François Sablet, self-portrait

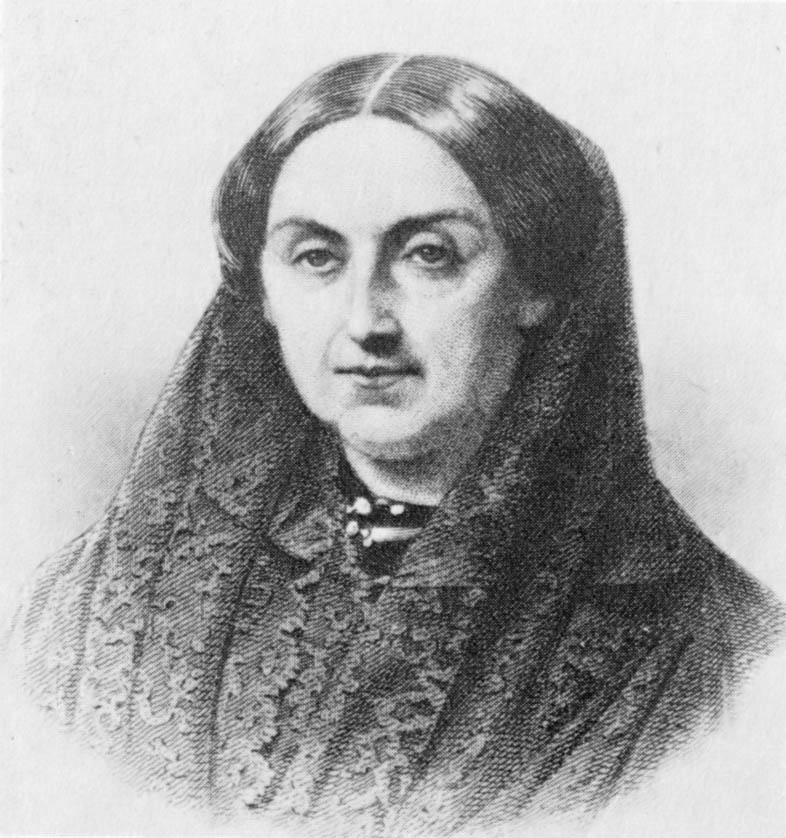
Fernán Caballero

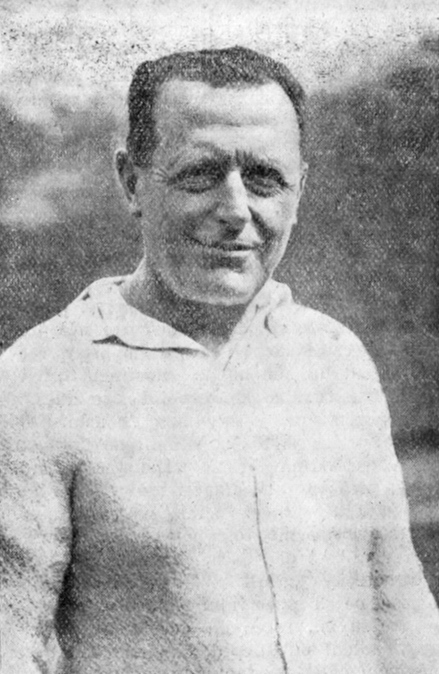
Claude Anet, 1931

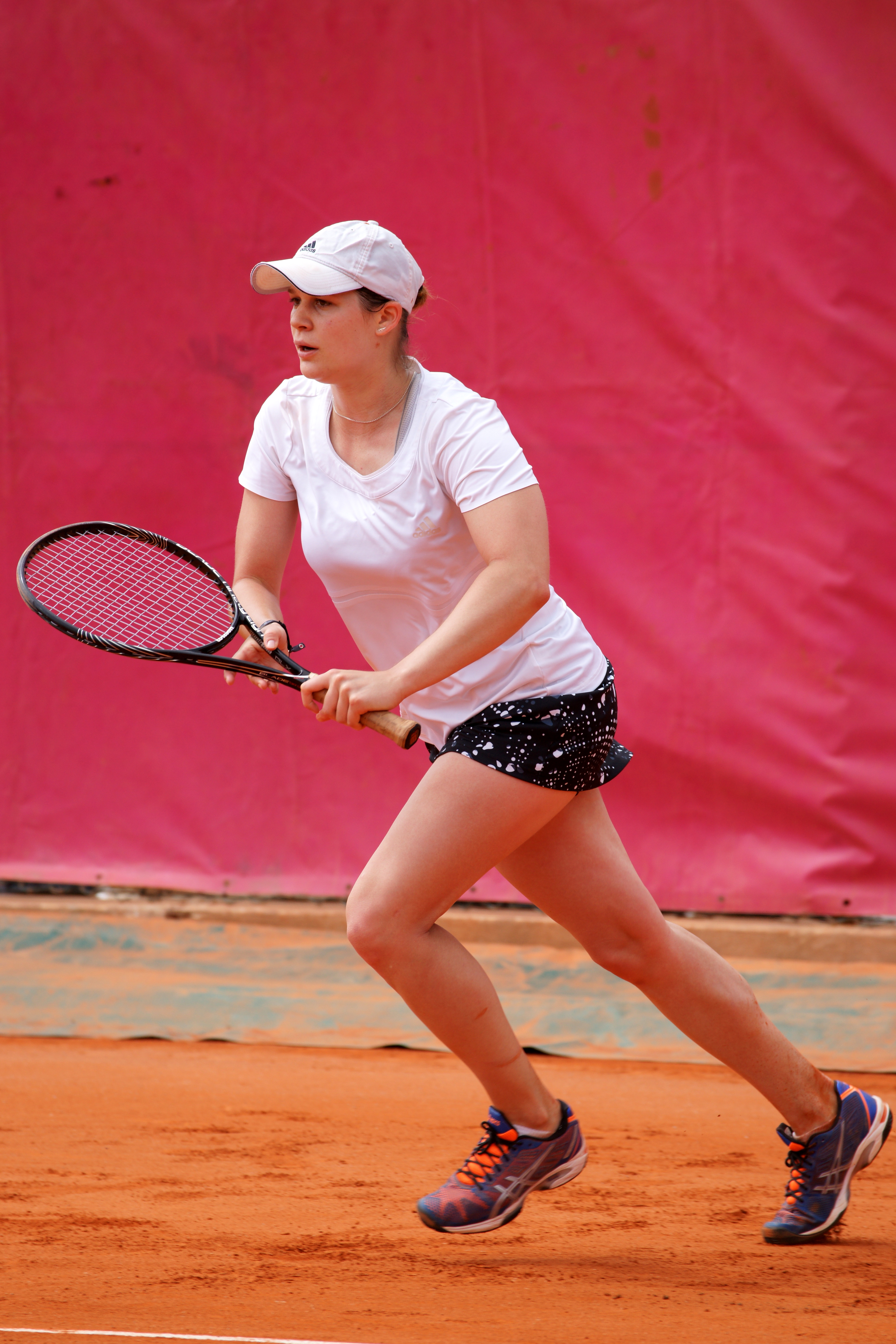
Lara Michel, 2015

=== Early times ===
- Margaret of Savoy (1420 in Morges – 1479) a daughter of Amadeus VIII of Savoy and Mary of Burgundy
- Claude Pache (d. 1605) Burgher and Abbé (Master) of the Guild of Shoemakers three times between 1576-1597. Founder of the Pache Family dynasty.
- Sieur Jean Pache (1626-1670) Prominent Burgher, Military Commander and Heraldist. Member of the Pache Family.

=== 18th century ===
- Charles-Emmanuel de Warnery (1720 in Morges – 1776) royal Prussian colonel, later a royal Polish general
- Henri de Catt (1725 in Morges – 1795) Swiss scholar, private secretary to Frederick the Great of Prussia
- John Francis Hobler (1727 in Morges – 1794 ) Swiss-born, naturalised-English, watchmaker
- Jean-Louis (Lewis) Pache (1727-1773) Swiss Hosier, Haberdasher, Pastel Merchant. Member of the Pache Family.
- Jean-André Venel (1740 in Morges – 1791) Swiss doctor, pioneer in the field of orthopedics
- Jean-François Sablet (1745 in Morges – 1819) French painter; part of a family of artists of Swiss origin
- Charles Henry-Pache (1749 in Morges – 1820) Swiss pastellist and supplier to The Royal Society. Member of the Pache Family.
- Jean-Marc Mousson (1776 in Morges – 1861) politician and civil servant, the first Chancellor of Switzerland from 1803 to 1830
- Fernán Caballero (1796 in Morges – 1877) pseudonym of the Spanish novelist Cecilia Francisca Josefa Böhl de Faber
- Marc Warnery (1797 in Morges – 1836) slave plantation overseer and director in Dutch Suriname

=== 19th century ===
- Louis Buvelot (1814 in Morges – 1888) landscape painter, influenced the Heidelberg School of painters
- François-Alphonse Forel (1841 in Morges – 1912) scientist, pioneered the study of lakes, founded limnology
- Eugen Bracht (1842 in Morges – 1921) a German landscape painter
- Auguste-Henri Forel (1848 in Morges – 1931) a myrmecologist, neuroanatomist, psychiatrist and eugenicist
- Victor Morax (1866 in Morges – 1935) Swiss ophthalmologist
- Jean Morax (1869–1939) Swiss painter and theatre decorator, born and died in Morges
- Henryk Opieński (1870 – 1942 in Morges) Polish composer, violinist, teacher and musicologist
- René Morax (1873–1963) Swiss poet and playwright, born and died in Morges
- Milo Martin (1893 in Morges – 1970) a Swiss sculptor and medal-artist

=== 20th century ===
- Igor Stravinsky, Russian-born composer, lived in Morges from 1915 to 1920
- Queen Anne of Romania (1923 – 2016 in Morges), wife of the former king Michael I of Romania
- Patrick Moraz (born 1948 in Morges), Swiss keyboardist, played with Yes and The Moody Blues
- Gilles Jobin (born 1964 in Morges), a Swiss dancer, choreographer and director
- Ignacy Jan Paderewski, Polish pianist and politician
- Nuria Gorrite (born 1970), grew up in Morges, President of the Council of State of Vaud

=== Sport ===
- Jean Schopfer (1868 in Morges – 1931), a French tennis player and a writer, known as Claude Anet
- Olivier Anken (born 1957 in Morges), a retired ice hockey player
- Dominique Bosshart (born 1977 in Morges), a Canadian taekwondo athlete, bronze medallist at the 2000 Summer Olympics, also competed at the 2004 Summer Olympics
- Jonathan Massacand (born 1984 in Morges), backstroke swimmer, competed in the 2008 Summer Olympics
- Yannick Weber (born 1988 in Morges), a Swiss professional ice hockey defenceman
- Yann Sommer (born 1988 in Morges), Swiss football goalkeeper
- Nikola Vučević (born 1990 in Morges), a Montenegrin professional basketball player
- Lara Michel (born 1991 in Morges), a Swiss tennis player
