= James Francis Helvetius Hobler =

James Francis Hobler 1764-1844

James Francis Helvetius Hobler (born 19 July 1765 in St Anne, London, England), the son of watch maker and exporter Jean Francois Hobler and wife Charlotte Elizabeth Claudon.

== Life ==
Baptised in the newly established Swiss Protestant Church in London on 11 August 1765, Francis Hobler, as he was commonly known, held the respected position of principal clerk to the Right Hon. Lord Mayor of London during the early-to-mid-19th century. As chief clerk, his duties were to provide informed legal counsel in the areas of criminal law and the statutes and civic customs of the city of London. Hobler held this position for the majority of his life, which included numerous changes to the civic chair. He retired in 1843 due to ill health.

Revered for his intellect and wit, Francis Hobler was once described as a "fine, tall, upright, powdered-headed gentleman of the old school, always neatly, though somewhat eccentrically dressed, in a closely buttoned-up black coat, drab breeches and gaiters, which seem to be essential to, and form a part of his very existence". (The Illustrated London News, 1843)

Fluent in English, French, Spanish, German and Latin, he was known for his punctuality, compassion and excellent memory. His vivid recollection of past events is best evidenced by an incident which occurred at Mansion House, where a young thief was facing a charge of burglary. "We have seen each other before now." (questioned Hobler) "No we haven't old boy" was the impudent reply upon which, quietly turning on his seat, Mr. Hobler said, "I think I've an invite of yours" and opening a drawer took out and read, to the great merriment of his listeners, a card printed in the hand writing of the prisoner in red ink, soliciting the four of his friends' attendance at a public-house in the Borough, to get "gloriously drunk" and which had been taken from his person on a commitment to Bridewell many years before as a rogue and vagabond." (The Illustrated London News, 1843)

Francis Hobler also appears on more than one occasion in the writings of Charles Dickens and George Augustus Sala. "The Lord Mayor threw himself back in his chair, in a state of frantic delight at his own joke; every vein in Mr. Hobler's countenance was swollen with laughter partly at the Lord Mayor's facetiousness, but more at his own; the constables and police officers were (as in duty bound) in ecstasies at Mr. Hobler and the Lord Mayor combined; and the very paupers, glancing respectfully at the beadle's countenance, tried to smile, as even he relaxed." (The Last Cab-Driver, And The First Omnibus Cad. Sketches by Boz, Charles Dickens, 1835)

Francis Hobler and his wife Mary Furby had four children, one of whom was solicitor and author Francis Hobler, Jnr (circa 1793-1868). His youngest son George Hobler (1800–1882) was an Australian pioneer who introduced the first Devon cow to Australia. Francis and Mary also had two daughters, Charlotte Elizabeth Hobler (born circa 1795) and Mary Ann Hobler (circa 1810-1850).

James Francis Helvetius Hobler died in Pentonville, London on 21 January 1844 (aged 78). He is buried at Highgate Cemetery along with his wife Mary and eldest son Francis.
