= Aubonne (disambiguation) =

Aubonne may refer to:

- Aubonne (river), a river in the canton of Vaud, Switzerland
- Aubonne, Doubs, a commune in Doubs, France
- Aubonne, Switzerland, a municipality in Switzerland
- Aubonne District, a former district of the canton of Vaud in Switzerland
- Aubonne Castle, a castle in the municipality of Aubonne of the Canton of Vaud in Switzerland
