= Pizy =

- Former municipality
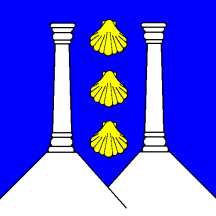
- Flag Coat of arms
- Location of Pizy
- Location within Switzerland Location within Canton of Vaud
- Coordinates: 46°29′N 06°21′E
- Country: Switzerland
- Canton: Vaud
- District: Morges

Area
  - Total: 2.51 km^{2} (0.97 sq mi)
- Elevation: 672 m (2,205 ft)

Population (2003)
  - Total: 78
  - Density: 31/km^{2} (80/sq mi)
- Time zone: UTC+01:00 (CET)
  - Summer (DST): UTC+02:00 (CEST)
- Postal code: 1174
- SFOS number: 5433
- ISO 3166 code: CH-VD
- Surrounded by: Aubonne, Bougy-Villars, Essertines-sur-Rolle, Féchy, Gimel, Montherod, Mont-sur-Rolle
- Website: Profile (in French), SFSO statistics

Pizy is a former municipality in the Swiss canton of Vaud. It is located in the district of Morges. On July 1, 2011 it was merged into Aubonne.

== History ==
Pizy is first mentioned in 1188 as Pisis.

== Geography ==
Pizy has an area, as of 2009, of 2.51 square kilometers (0.97 sq mi). Of this area, 1.64 km^{2} (0.63 sq mi) or 65.3% is used for agricultural purposes, while 0.67 km^{2} (0.26 sq mi) or 26.7% is forested. Of the rest of the land, 0.16 km^{2} (0.062 sq mi) or 6.4% is settled (buildings or roads), 0.02 km^{2} (4.9 acres) or 0.8% is either rivers or lakes.

Of the built up area, housing and buildings made up 2.8% and transportation infrastructure made up 2.8%. Out of the forested land, 24.7% of the total land area is heavily forested and 2.0% is covered with orchards or small clusters of trees. Of the agricultural land, 55.0% is used for growing crops and 10.4% is pastures. All the water in the municipality is flowing water.

The municipality was part of the Aubonne District until it was dissolved on 31 August 2006, and Pizy became part of the new district of Morges.

The municipality consists of scattered houses between Aubonne and Gimel.

The municipality of Pizy was merged on 1 July 2011 into the municipality of Aubonne.

== Coat of arms ==
The blazon of the municipal coat of arms is Azure, on two Hills as many Columns Argent, three Escallops palewise Or.

== Demographics ==
Pizy has a population (as of 2003) of 78. As of 2008, 9.3% of the population are resident foreign nationals. Over the last 10 years (1999–2009 ) the population has changed at a rate of 10.8%. It has changed at a rate of -2.7% due to migration and at a rate of 13.5% due to births and deaths.

Most of the population (as of 2000) speaks French (57 or 87.7%), with German being second most common (6 or 9.2%) and Italian being third (1 or 1.5%).

Of the population in the municipality 24 or about 36.9% were born in Pizy and lived there in 2000. There were 19 or 29.2% who were born in the same canton, while 15 or 23.1% were born somewhere else in Switzerland, and 7 or 10.8% were born outside of Switzerland.

In 2008 there was 1 birth to non-Swiss citizens. Ignoring immigration and emigration, the population of Swiss citizens remained the same while the foreign population increased by 1. There was 1 non-Swiss man who immigrated from another country to Switzerland. The total Swiss population change in 2008 (from all sources, including moves across municipal borders) was an increase of 3 and the non-Swiss population decreased by 2 people. This represents a population growth rate of 1.4%.

The age distribution, as of 2009, in Pizy is; 13 children or 15.9% of the population are between 0 and 9 years old and 6 teenagers or 7.3% are between 10 and 19. Of the adult population, 6 people or 7.3% of the population are between 20 and 29 years old. 15 people or 18.3% are between 30 and 39, 11 people or 13.4% are between 40 and 49, and 12 people or 14.6% are between 50 and 59. The senior population distribution is 8 people or 9.8% of the population are between 60 and 69 years old, people or 0.0% are between 70 and 79, there are 10 people or 12.2% who are between 80 and 89, and there is 1 person who is 90 and older.

As of 2000, there were 24 people who were single and never married in the municipality. There were 37 married individuals, 1 widow or widower and 3 individuals who are divorced.

As of 2000 the average number of residents per living room was 0.46 which is fewer people per room than the cantonal average of 0.61 per room. In this case, a room is defined as space of a housing unit of at least 4 m^{2} (43 sq ft) as normal bedrooms, dining rooms, living rooms, kitchens and habitable cellars and attics. About 47.8% of the total households were owner occupied, or in other words did not pay rent (though they may have a mortgage or a rent-to-own agreement).

As of 2000, there were 29 private households in the municipality, and an average of 2.2 persons per household. There were 10 households that consist of only one person and 1 households with five or more people. Out of a total of 30 households that answered this question, 33.3% were households made up of just one person. Of the rest of the households, there are 9 married couples without children, 9 married couples with children There was one single parent with a child or children.

In 2000 there were 7 single family homes (or 38.9% of the total) out of a total of 18 inhabited buildings. There were 3 multi-family buildings (16.7%), along with 6 multi-purpose buildings that were mostly used for housing (33.3%) and 2 other use buildings (commercial or industrial) that also had some housing (11.1%). Of the single family homes 4 were built before 1919. The most multi-family homes (2) were built before 1919 and the next most (1) were built between 1961 and 1970.

In 2000 there were 27 apartments in the municipality. The most common apartment size was 3 rooms of which there were 10. There were 1 single room apartments and 8 apartments with five or more rooms. Of these apartments, a total of 23 apartments (85.2% of the total) were permanently occupied, while 3 apartments (11.1%) were seasonally occupied and one apartment was empty. As of 2009, the construction rate of new housing units was 0 new units per 1000 residents. The vacancy rate for the municipality, in 2010, was 0%.

The historical population is given in the following chart:

== Politics ==
In the 2007 federal election the most popular party was the SVP which received 56.33% of the vote. The next three most popular parties were the Green Party (15.14%), the SP (12.9%) and the FDP (6.7%). In the federal election, a total of 23 votes were cast, and the voter turnout was 47.9%.

== Economy ==
As of 2010, Pizy had an unemployment rate of 0.8%. As of 2008, there were 9 people employed in the primary economic sector and about 4 businesses involved in this sector. 3 people were employed in the secondary sector and there were 2 businesses in this sector. 2 people were employed in the tertiary sector, with 1 business in this sector. There were 38 residents of the municipality who were employed in some capacity, of which females made up 42.1% of the workforce.

In 2008 the total number of full-time equivalent jobs was 11. The number of jobs in the primary sector was 6, all of which were in agriculture. The number of jobs in the secondary sector was 3, all of which were in manufacturing. The number of jobs in the tertiary sector was 2, both technical professionals or scientists.

In 2000, there were 8 workers who commuted into the municipality and 21 workers who commuted away. The municipality is a net exporter of workers, with about 2.6 workers leaving the municipality for every one entering. Of the working population, 2.6% used public transportation to get to work, and 52.6% used a private car.

== Religion ==
From the 2000 census, 11 or 16.9% were Roman Catholic, while 39 or 60.0% belonged to the Swiss Reformed Church. Of the rest of the population, and there was 1 individual who belongs to another Christian church. 8 (or about 12.31% of the population) belonged to no church, are agnostic or atheist, and 6 individuals (or about 9.23% of the population) did not answer the question.

== Education ==
In Pizy about 30 or (46.2%) of the population have completed non-mandatory upper secondary education, and 8 or (12.3%) have completed additional higher education (either university or a Fachhochschule). Of the 8 who completed tertiary schooling, 37.5% were Swiss men, 50.0% were Swiss women.

In the 2009/2010 school year there were a total of 9 students in the Pizy school district. In the Vaud cantonal school system, two years of non-obligatory pre-school are provided by the political districts. During the school year, the political district provided pre-school care for a total of 631 children of which 203 children (32.2%) received subsidized pre-school care. The canton's primary school program requires students to attend for four years. There were 5 students in the municipal primary school program. The obligatory lower secondary school program lasts for six years and there were 4 students in those schools.

As of 2000, there were 9 students from Pizy who attended schools outside the municipality.
