= Saint-Livres =

- Municipality
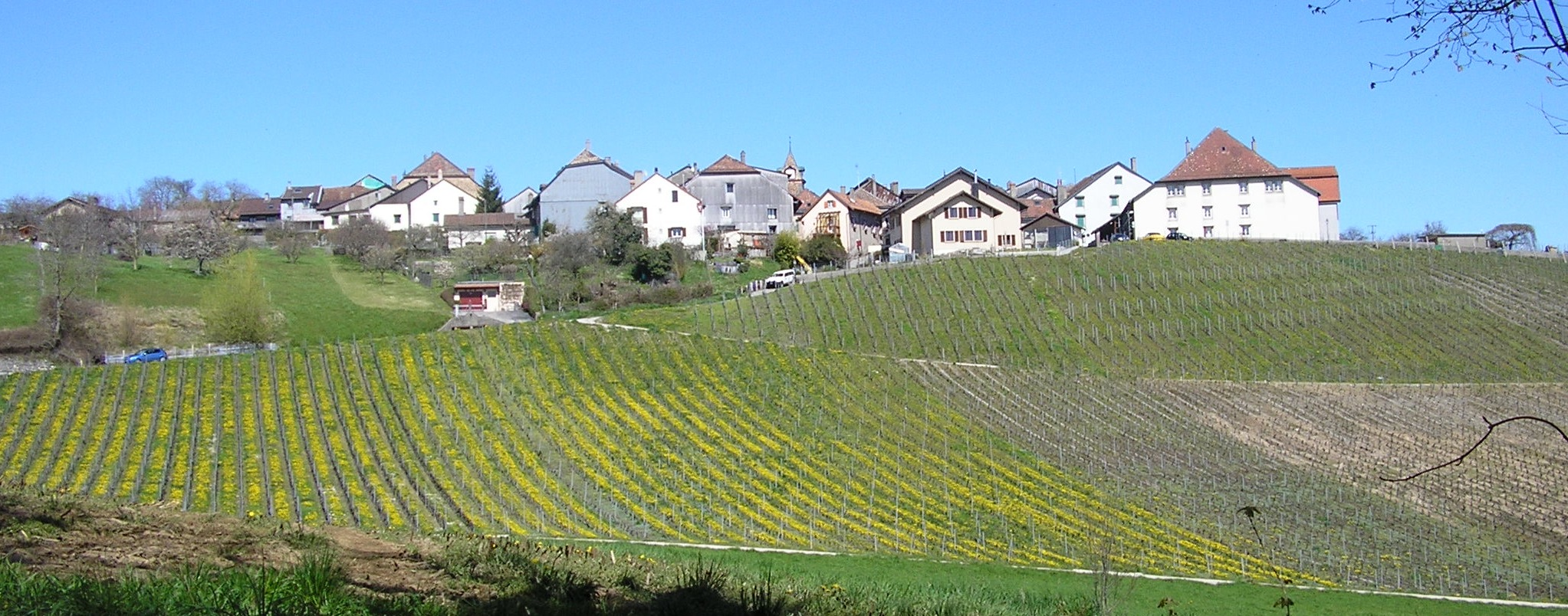
- Saint-Livres village

- Flag Coat of arms
- Location of Saint-Livres
- Location within Switzerland Location within Canton of Vaud
- Coordinates: 46°30′N 06°23′E
- Country: Switzerland
- Canton: Vaud
- District: Morges

Government
  - Mayor: Syndic

Area
  - Total: 8.12 km^{2} (3.14 sq mi)
- Elevation: 603 m (1,978 ft)

Population (2003)
  - Total: 544
  - Density: 67.0/km^{2} (174/sq mi)
- Time zone: UTC+01:00 (CET)
  - Summer (DST): UTC+02:00 (CEST)
- Postal code: 1176
- SFOS number: 5435
- ISO 3166 code: CH-VD
- Surrounded by: Aubonne, Bière, Lavigny, Montherod, Yens
- Website: https://st-livres.ch Profile (in French), SFSO statistics

Saint-Livres is a municipality in the district of Morges in the canton of Vaud in Switzerland.

== History ==
Saint-Livres is first mentioned in 1220 as apud Sanctum Liberium.

== Geography ==
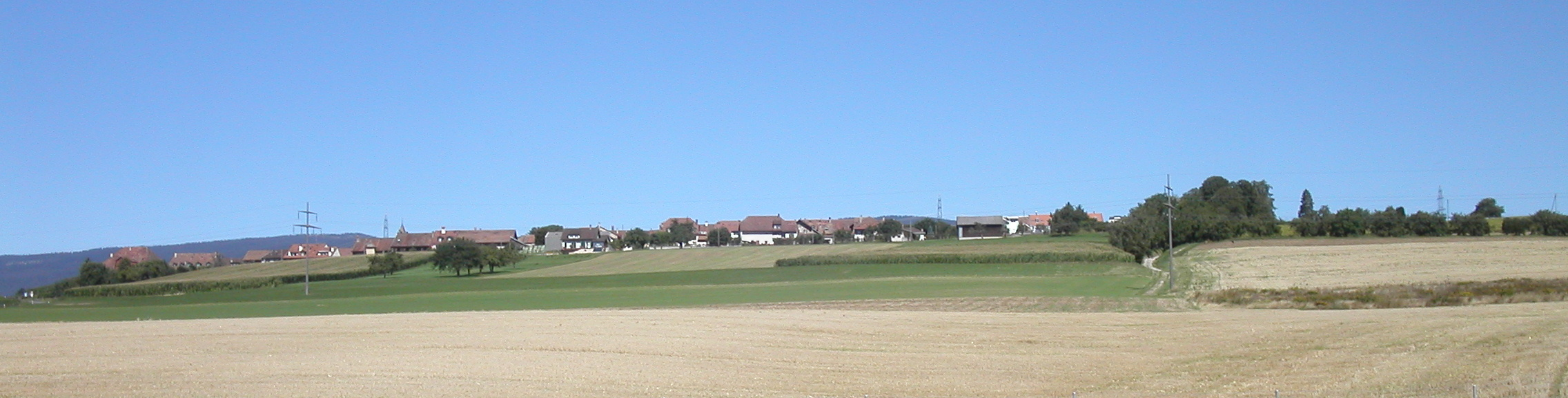
View of Saint-Livres

Aerial view (1949)

Saint-Livres has an area, as of 2009, of 8.12 square kilometers (3.14 sq mi). Of this area, 4.02 km^{2} (1.55 sq mi) or 49.5% is used for agricultural purposes, while 3.48 km^{2} (1.34 sq mi) or 42.9% is forested. Of the rest of the land, 0.53 km^{2} (0.20 sq mi) or 6.5% is settled (buildings or roads), 0.05 km^{2} (12 acres) or 0.6% is either rivers or lakes and 0.02 km^{2} (4.9 acres) or 0.2% is unproductive land.

Of the built up area, housing and buildings made up 2.1% and transportation infrastructure made up 2.3%. while parks, green belts and sports fields made up 1.2%. Out of the forested land, 41.4% of the total land area is heavily forested and 1.5% is covered with orchards or small clusters of trees. Of the agricultural land, 35.0% is used for growing crops and 9.4% is pastures, while 5.2% is used for orchards or vine crops. All the water in the municipality is flowing water.

The municipality was part of the Aubonne District until it was dissolved on 31 August 2006, and Saint-Livres became part of the new district of Morges.

The municipality is located on the Col du Marchairuz road.

== Coat of arms ==
The blazon of the municipal coat of arms is Or, two Spruce Branches in saltire Vert fructed Gules.

== Demographics ==
Saint-Livres has a population (as of December 2020) of 684. As of 2008, 10.5% of the population are resident foreign nationals. Over the last 10 years (1999–2009 ) the population has changed at a rate of 15.6%. It has changed at a rate of 13.5% due to migration and at a rate of 2.2% due to births and deaths.

Most of the population (as of 2000) speaks French (494 or 91.8%), with German being second most common (19 or 3.5%) and English being third (10 or 1.9%). There are 3 people who speak Italian.

Of the population in the municipality 193 or about 35.9% were born in Saint-Livres and lived there in 2000. There were 195 or 36.2% who were born in the same canton, while 87 or 16.2% were born somewhere else in Switzerland, and 57 or 10.6% were born outside of Switzerland.

In 2008 there were 5 live births to Swiss citizens and were 7 deaths of Swiss citizens. Ignoring immigration and emigration, the population of Swiss citizens decreased by 2 while the foreign population remained the same. There was 1 Swiss man who emigrated from Switzerland. At the same time, there were 4 non-Swiss men and 2 non-Swiss women who immigrated from another country to Switzerland. The total Swiss population change in 2008 (from all sources, including moves across municipal borders) was an increase of 11 and the non-Swiss population increased by 5 people. This represents a population growth rate of 2.8%.

The age distribution, as of 2009, in Saint-Livres is; 72 children or 12.6% of the population are between 0 and 9 years old and 79 teenagers or 13.8% are between 10 and 19. Of the adult population, 58 people or 10.1% of the population are between 20 and 29 years old. 80 people or 14.0% are between 30 and 39, 114 people or 19.9% are between 40 and 49, and 58 people or 10.1% are between 50 and 59. The senior population distribution is 56 people or 9.8% of the population are between 60 and 69 years old, 43 people or 7.5% are between 70 and 79, there are 9 people or 1.6% who are between 80 and 89, and there are 3 people or 0.5% who are 90 and older.

As of 2000, there were 224 people who were single and never married in the municipality. There were 275 married individuals, 18 widows or widowers and 21 individuals who are divorced.

As of 2000, there were 213 private households in the municipality, and an average of 2.5 persons per household. There were 55 households that consist of only one person and 21 households with five or more people. Out of a total of 216 households that answered this question, 25.5% were households made up of just one person and there were 2 adults who lived with their parents. Of the rest of the households, there are 71 married couples without children, 73 married couples with children There were 9 single parents with a child or children. There were 3 households that were made up of unrelated people and 3 households that were made up of some sort of institution or another collective housing.

In 2000 there were 80 single family homes (or 51.6% of the total) out of a total of 155 inhabited buildings. There were 29 multi-family buildings (18.7%), along with 40 multi-purpose buildings that were mostly used for housing (25.8%) and 6 other use buildings (commercial or industrial) that also had some housing (3.9%). Of the single family homes 31 were built before 1919, while 17 were built between 1990 and 2000. The most multi-family homes (20) were built before 1919 and the next most (3) were built between 1991 and 1995. There were 2 multi-family houses built between 1996 and 2000.

In 2000 there were 227 apartments in the municipality. The most common apartment size was 4 rooms of which there were 65. There were 12 single room apartments and 65 apartments with five or more rooms. Of these apartments, a total of 205 apartments (90.3% of the total) were permanently occupied, while 15 apartments (6.6%) were seasonally occupied and 7 apartments (3.1%) were empty. As of 2009, the construction rate of new housing units was 1.7 new units per 1000 residents. The vacancy rate for the municipality, in 2010, was 5.6%.

The historical population is given in the following chart:

== Sights ==
The entire village of Saint-Livres is designated as part of the Inventory of Swiss Heritage Sites.

== Politics ==
In the 2007 federal election the most popular party was the SP which received 29.49% of the vote. The next three most popular parties were the SVP (28.05%), the Green Party (12.05%) and the LPS Party (11.27%). In the federal election, a total of 164 votes were cast, and the voter turnout was 42.8%.

== Economy ==
As of 2010, Saint-Livres had an unemployment rate of 2.9%. As of 2008, there were 46 people employed in the primary economic sector and about 17 businesses involved in this sector. 7 people were employed in the secondary sector and there was 1 business in this sector. 25 people were employed in the tertiary sector, with 11 businesses in this sector. There were 283 residents of the municipality who were employed in some capacity, of which females made up 45.2% of the workforce.

In 2008 the total number of full-time equivalent jobs was 61. The number of jobs in the primary sector was 36, all of which were in agriculture. The number of jobs in the secondary sector was 6, all of which were in construction. The number of jobs in the tertiary sector was 19. In the tertiary sector; 5 or 26.3% were in wholesale or retail sales or the repair of motor vehicles, 1 was in a hotel or restaurant, 7 or 36.8% were technical professionals or scientists, 4 or 21.1% were in education.

In 2000, there were 15 workers who commuted into the municipality and 196 workers who commuted away. The municipality is a net exporter of workers, with about 13.1 workers leaving the municipality for every one entering. Of the working population, 5.7% used public transportation to get to work, and 65% used a private car.

== Religion ==
From the 2000 census, 101 or 18.8% were Roman Catholic, while 293 or 54.5% belonged to the Swiss Reformed Church. Of the rest of the population, there were 6 members of an Orthodox church (or about 1.12% of the population), and there were 18 individuals (or about 3.35% of the population) who belonged to another Christian church. There were 6 (or about 1.12% of the population) who were Islamic. There were 2 individuals who were Buddhist and 1 individual who belonged to another church. 103 (or about 19.14% of the population) belonged to no church, are agnostic or atheist, and 8 individuals (or about 1.49% of the population) did not answer the question.

== Education ==
In Saint-Livres about 184 or (34.2%) of the population have completed non-mandatory upper secondary education, and 76 or (14.1%) have completed additional higher education (either university or a Fachhochschule). Of the 76 who completed tertiary schooling, 50.0% were Swiss men, 32.9% were Swiss women, 7.9% were non-Swiss men and 9.2% were non-Swiss women.

In the 2009/2010 school year there were a total of 74 students in the Saint-Livres school district. In the Vaud cantonal school system, two years of non-obligatory pre-school are provided by the political districts. During the school year, the political district provided pre-school care for a total of 631 children of which 203 children (32.2%) received subsidized pre-school care. The canton's primary school program requires students to attend for four years. There were 42 students in the municipal primary school program. The obligatory lower secondary school program lasts for six years and there were 31 students in those schools. There were also 1 students who were home schooled or attended another non-traditional school.

As of 2000, there were 8 students in Saint-Livres who came from another municipality, while 93 residents attended schools outside the municipality.
