= Lavigny, Switzerland =

Lavigny
- Municipality
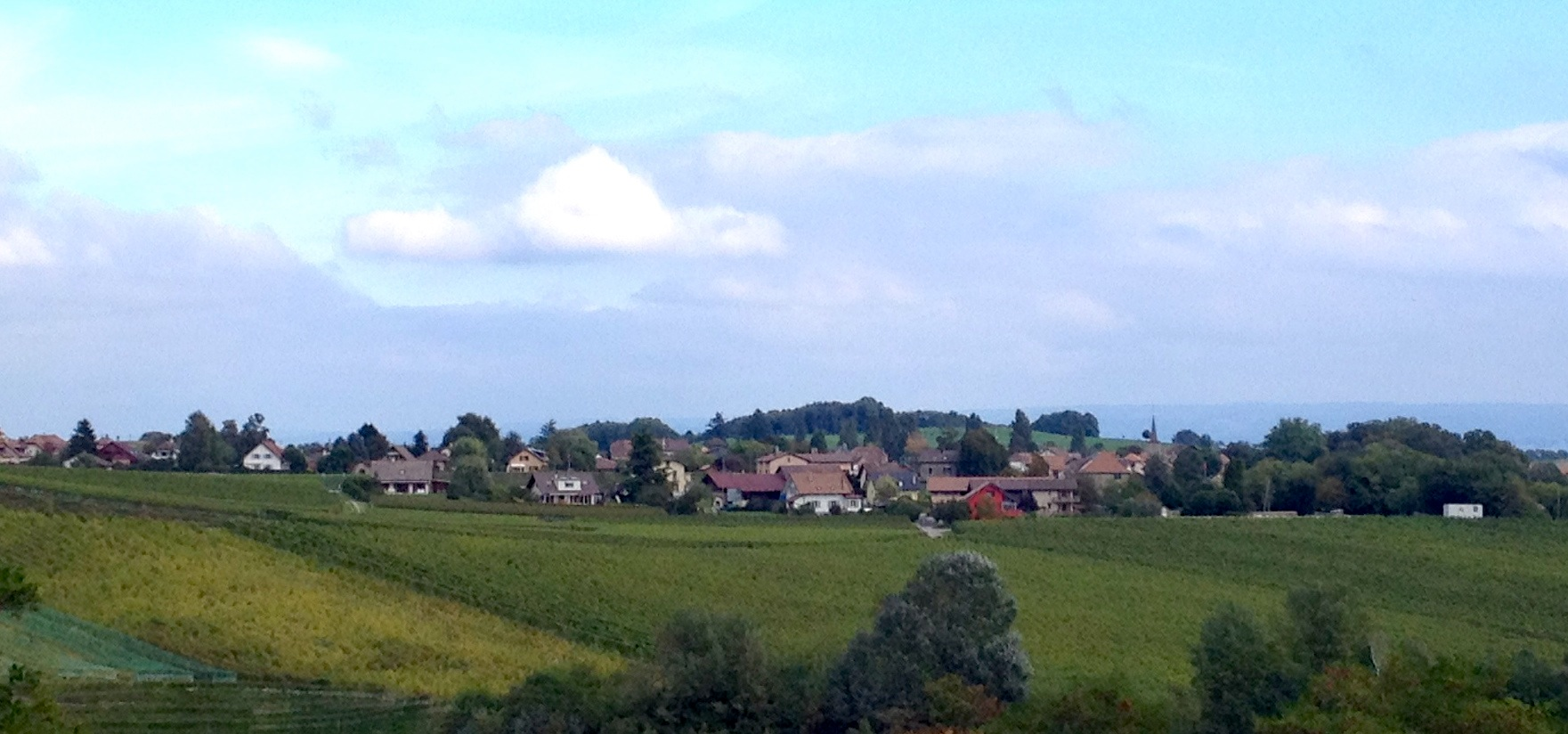

- Flag Coat of arms
- Location of Lavigny
- Location within Switzerland Location within Canton of Vaud
- Coordinates: 46°30′N 06°24′E
- Country: Switzerland
- Canton: Vaud
- District: Morges

Government
  - Mayor: Syndic; Luc Germanier

Area
  - Total: 4.01 km^{2} (1.55 sq mi)
- Elevation: 522 m (1,713 ft)

Population (2003)
  - Total: 711
  - Density: 177/km^{2} (459/sq mi)
- Time zone: UTC+01:00 (CET)
  - Summer (DST): UTC+02:00 (CEST)
- Postal code: 1175
- SFOS number: 5637
- ISO 3166 code: CH-VD
- Surrounded by: Aubonne, Etoy, Saint-Livres, Villars-sous-Yens, Yens
- Website: www.lavigny.ch

Lavigny is a municipality in the district of Morges of the canton of Vaud, Switzerland.

== History ==
Lavigny is first mentioned in 1145 as Lauiniaco.

== Geography ==
Lavigny has an area, as of 2009, of 4 square kilometers (1.5 mi^{2}). Of this area, 3.24 km^{2} (1.25 mi^{2}) or 81.0% is used for agricultural purposes, while 0.2 km^{2} (0.077 mi^{2}) or 5.0% is forested. Of the rest of the land, 0.5 km^{2} (0.19 mi^{2}) or 12.5% is settled (buildings or roads), 0.01 km^{2} (2.5 acres) or 0.3% is either rivers or lakes and 0.02 km^{2} (4.9 acres) or 0.5% is unproductive land.

Of the built up area, industrial buildings made up 1.3% of the total area while housing and buildings made up 6.0% and transportation infrastructure made up 3.5%. while parks, green belts and sports fields made up 1.3%. Out of the forested land, 3.5% of the total land area is heavily forested and 1.5% is covered with orchards or small clusters of trees. Of the agricultural land, 60.3% is used for growing crops and 3.0% is pastures, while 17.8% is used for orchards or vine crops. All the water in the municipality is flowing water.

The municipality was part of the Morges District until it was dissolved on 31 August 2006, and Lavigny became part of the new district of Morges.

The municipality is located on the vineyard covered hills above Lake Geneva.

== Coat of arms ==
The blazon of the municipal coat of arms is Azure, a Vine Argent fructed Or.

== Demographics ==
Lavigny has a population (as of December 2020) of 1,006. As of 2008, 22.4% of the population are resident foreign nationals. Over the last 10 years (1999–2009 ) the population has changed at a rate of 11.3%. It has changed at a rate of 8.3% due to migration and at a rate of 3.2% due to births and deaths.

Most of the population (as of 2000) speaks French (616 or 87.9%), with German being second most common (29 or 4.1%) and Portuguese being third (21 or 3.0%). There are 4 people who speak Italian.

Of the population in the municipality 130 or about 18.5% were born in Lavigny and lived there in 2000. There were 262 or 37.4% who were born in the same canton, while 119 or 17.0% were born somewhere else in Switzerland, and 178 or 25.4% were born outside of Switzerland.

In 2008 there were 4 live births to Swiss citizens and 1 birth to non-Swiss citizens, and in same time span there were 2 deaths of Swiss citizens. Ignoring immigration and emigration, the population of Swiss citizens increased by 2 while the foreign population increased by 1. There was 1 Swiss man who emigrated from Switzerland and 1 Swiss woman who immigrated back to Switzerland. At the same time, there were 6 non-Swiss men and 5 non-Swiss women who immigrated from another country to Switzerland. The total Swiss population change in 2008 (from all sources, including moves across municipal borders) was an increase of 4 and the non-Swiss population increased by 9 people. This represents a population growth rate of 1.7%.

The age distribution, as of 2009, in Lavigny is; 109 children or 14.8% of the population are between 0 and 9 years old and 104 teenagers or 14.1% are between 10 and 19. Of the adult population, 61 people or 8.3% of the population are between 20 and 29 years old. 93 people or 12.6% are between 30 and 39, 126 people or 17.1% are between 40 and 49, and 113 people or 15.3% are between 50 and 59. The senior population distribution is 77 people or 10.4% of the population are between 60 and 69 years old, 35 people or 4.7% are between 70 and 79, there are 17 people or 2.3% who are between 80 and 89, and there are 3 people or 0.4% who are 90 and older.

As of 2000, there were 346 people who were single and never married in the municipality. There were 314 married individuals, 15 widows or widowers and 26 individuals who are divorced.

As of 2000, there were 231 private households in the municipality, and an average of 2.6 persons per household. There were 63 households that consist of only one person and 25 households with five or more people. Out of a total of 240 households that answered this question, 26.3% were households made up of just one person. Of the rest of the households, there are 58 married couples without children, 94 married couples with children There were 14 single parents with a child or children. There were 2 households that were made up of unrelated people and 9 households that were made up of some sort of institution or another collective housing.

In 2000 there were 80 single family homes (or 57.6% of the total) out of a total of 139 inhabited buildings. There were 29 multi-family buildings (20.9%), along with 19 multi-purpose buildings that were mostly used for housing (13.7%) and 11 other use buildings (commercial or industrial) that also had some housing (7.9%). Of the single family homes 19 were built before 1919, while 17 were built between 1990 and 2000. The greatest number of single family homes (25) were built between 1981 and 1990. The most multi-family homes (9) were built between 1981 and 1990 and the next most (6) were built before 1919. There was 1 multi-family house built between 1996 and 2000.

In 2000 there were 240 apartments in the municipality. The most common apartment size was 4 rooms of which there were 65. There were 14 single room apartments and 83 apartments with five or more rooms. Of these apartments, a total of 219 apartments (91.3% of the total) were permanently occupied, while 17 apartments (7.1%) were seasonally occupied and 4 apartments (1.7%) were empty. As of 2009, the construction rate of new housing units was 0 new units per 1000 residents. The vacancy rate for the municipality, in 2010, was 0%.

The historical population is given in the following chart:

== Sights ==
The entire village of Lavigny is designated as part of the Inventory of Swiss Heritage Sites.

== Politics ==
In the 2007 federal election the most popular party was the SP which received 18.99% of the vote. The next three most popular parties were the FDP (18.71%), the SVP (18.68%) and the Green Party (12.95%). In the federal election, a total of 224 votes were cast, and the voter turnout was 46.5%.

== Economy ==
As of 2010, Lavigny had an unemployment rate of 3.1%. As of 2008, there were 31 people employed in the primary economic sector and about 8 businesses involved in this sector. 77 people were employed in the secondary sector and there were 13 businesses in this sector. 629 people were employed in the tertiary sector, with 19 businesses in this sector. There were 322 residents of the municipality who were employed in some capacity, of which females made up 45.0% of the workforce.

In 2008 the total number of full-time equivalent jobs was 577. The number of jobs in the primary sector was 23, all of which were in agriculture. The number of jobs in the secondary sector was 70 of which 22 or (31.4%) were in manufacturing and 42 (60.0%) were in construction. The number of jobs in the tertiary sector was 484. In the tertiary sector; 11 or 2.3% were in wholesale or retail sales or the repair of motor vehicles, 1 was in the movement and storage of goods, 6 or 1.2% were in a hotel or restaurant, 49 or 10.1% were technical professionals or scientists, 15 or 3.1% were in education and 352 or 72.7% were in health care.

In 2000, there were 377 workers who commuted into the municipality and 226 workers who commuted away. The municipality is a net importer of workers, with about 1.7 workers entering the municipality for every one leaving. Of the working population, 8.7% used public transportation to get to work, and 64% used a private car.

== Religion ==
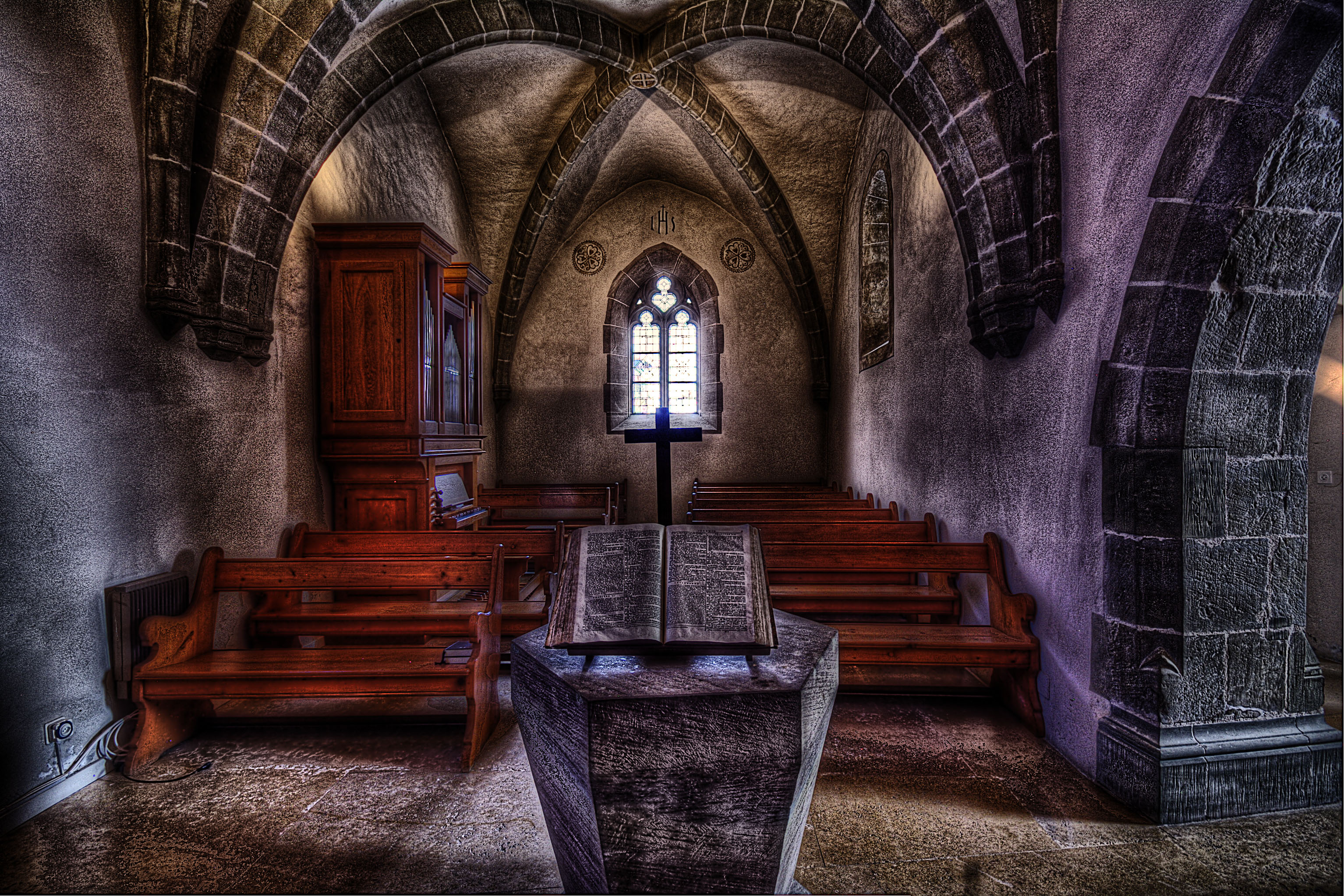
Interior of a church in Lavigny

From the 2000 census, 182 or 26.0% were Roman Catholic, while 298 or 42.5% belonged to the Evangelical Reformed Church of the Canton of Vaud. Of the rest of the population, there were 10 members of an Orthodox church (or about 1.43% of the population), and there were 170 individuals (or about 24.25% of the population) who belonged to another Christian church. There were 12 (or about 1.71% of the population) who were Islamic. There were 2 individuals who were Hindu. 92 (or about 13.12% of the population) belonged to no church, are agnostic or atheist, and 17 individuals (or about 2.43% of the population) did not answer the question.

== Education ==
In Lavigny about 214 or (30.5%) of the population have completed non-mandatory upper secondary education, and 109 or (15.5%) have completed additional higher education (either university or a Fachhochschule). Of the 109 who completed tertiary schooling, 52.3% were Swiss men, 28.4% were Swiss women, 13.8% were non-Swiss men and 5.5% were non-Swiss women.

In the 2009/2010 school year there were a total of 121 students in the Lavigny school district. In the Vaud cantonal school system, two years of non-obligatory pre-school are provided by the political districts. During the school year, the political district provided pre-school care for a total of 631 children of which 203 children (32.2%) received subsidized pre-school care. The canton's primary school program requires students to attend for four years. There were 71 students in the municipal primary school program. The obligatory lower secondary school program lasts for six years and there were 50 students in those schools.

As of 2000, there were 73 students in Lavigny who came from another municipality, while 102 residents attended schools outside the municipality.
