= Bougy-Villars =

- Municipality
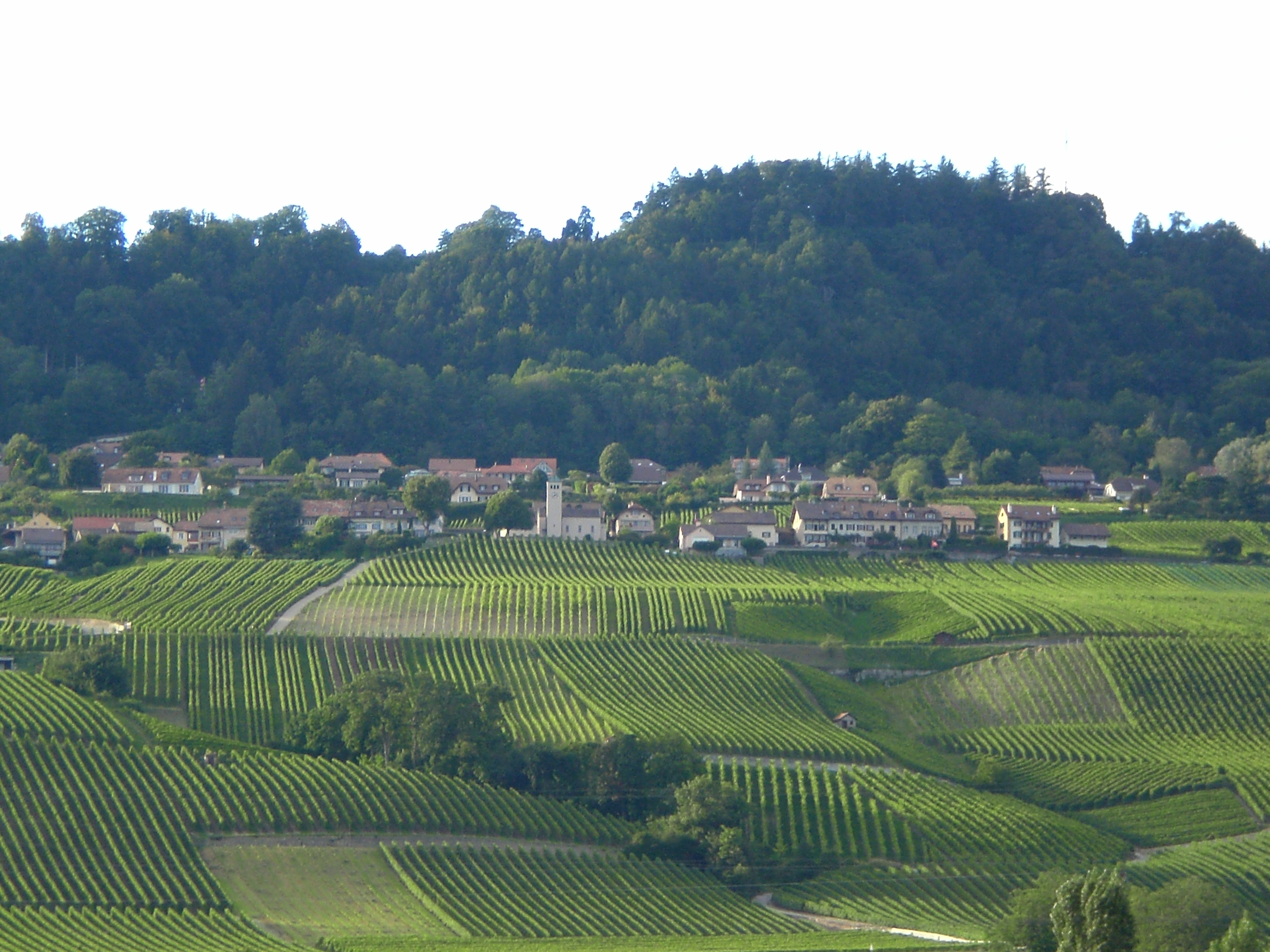
- Bougy-Villars

- Flag Coat of arms
- Location of Bougy-Villars
- Location within Switzerland Location within Canton of Vaud
- Coordinates: 46°29′N 06°21′E
- Country: Switzerland
- Canton: Vaud
- District: Morges

Government
  - Mayor: Syndic

Area
  - Total: 1.77 km^{2} (0.68 sq mi)
- Elevation: 548 m (1,798 ft)

Population (2006)
  - Total: 429
  - Density: 242/km^{2} (628/sq mi)
- Time zone: UTC+01:00 (CET)
  - Summer (DST): UTC+02:00 (CEST)
- Postal code: 1172
- SFOS number: 5426
- ISO 3166 code: CH-VD
- Surrounded by: Essertines-sur-Rolle, Féchy, Mont-sur-Rolle, Perroy, Pizy
- Website: www.bougy-villars.ch

Bougy-Villars is a municipality in the Swiss canton of Vaud, located in the district of Morges.

== History ==
Bougy-Villars is first mentioned in 996 as in villa Balgedelco. Starting in 1285 and until the end of the 19th century, it was known as Bougy-Milon. Thereafter, it was known as Bougy until 1953, when it became Bougy-Villars. Originally a wine growing village, by the 21st century, Bougy-Villars had gained a reputation as a scenic and affluent residential area.

== Geography ==
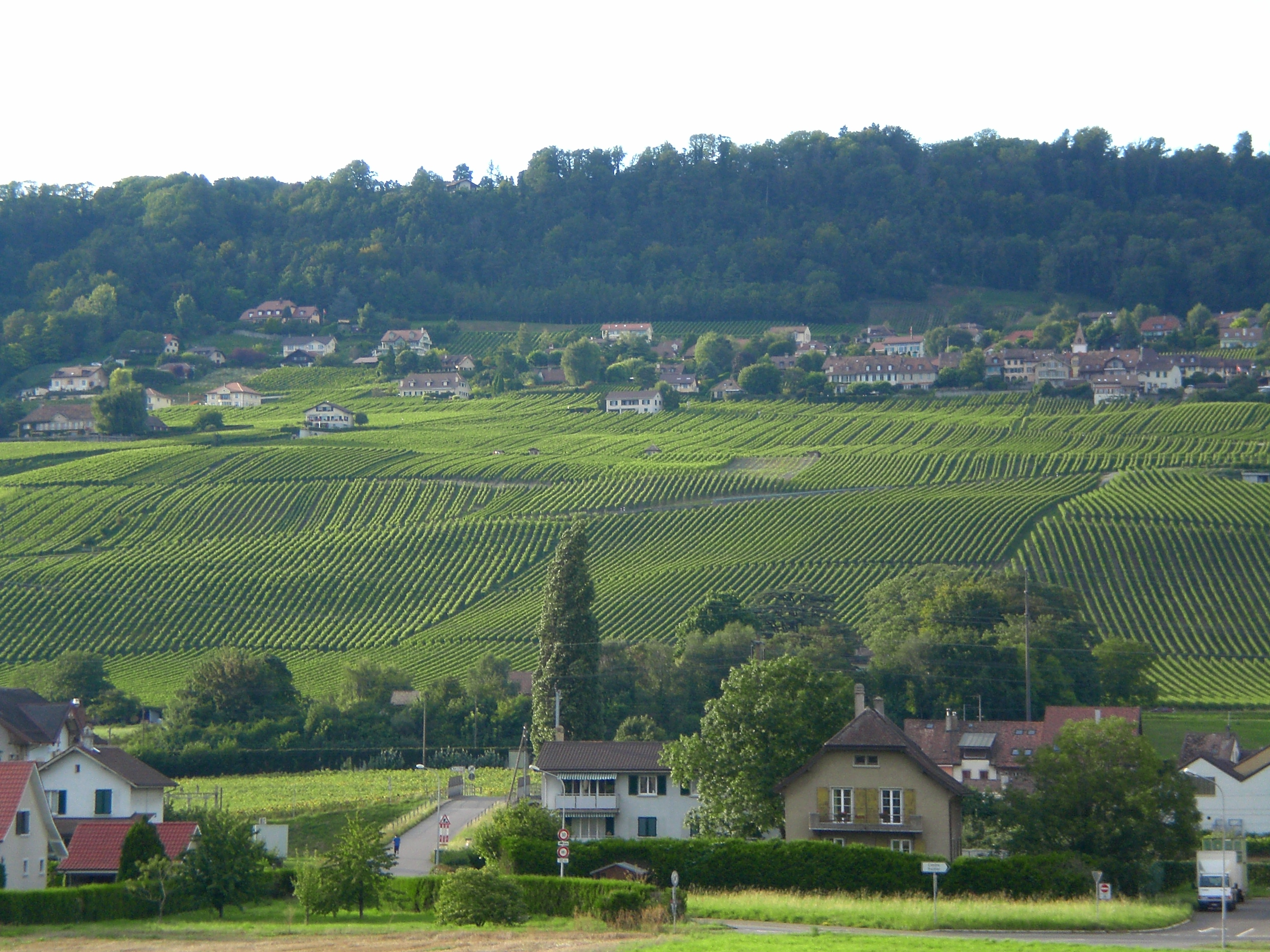
Bougy-Villars

Bougy-Villars has an area, as of 2009, of 1.77 square kilometers (0.68 sq mi). Of this area, 0.68 km^{2} (0.26 sq mi) or 38.4% is used for agricultural purposes, while 0.4 km^{2} (0.15 sq mi) or 22.6% is forested. Of the rest of the land, 0.69 km^{2} (0.27 sq mi) or 39.0% is settled (buildings or roads), 0.01 km^{2} (2.5 acres) or 0.6% is either rivers or lakes.

Of the built up area, housing and buildings made up 9.6% and transportation infrastructure made up 5.1%. while parks, green belts and sports fields made up 23.7%. Out of the forested land, all of the forested land area is covered with heavy forests. Of the agricultural land, 9.0% is used for growing crops and 5.6% is pastures, while 23.7% is used for orchards or vine crops. All the water in the municipality is flowing water.

The municipality was part of the Aubonne District until it was dissolved on 31 August 2006, and Bougy-Villars became part of the new district of Morges.

The municipality is located in Côte wine growing region. The village is situated between Rolle and Signal-de-Bougy.

== Coat of arms ==
The blazon of the municipal coat of arms is Or, a bend bendy sinister of eight Argent and Vert.

== Demographics ==
Bougy-Villars has a population (as of December 2020) of 478. As of 2008, 25.9% of the population are resident foreign nationals. Over the last 10 years (1999–2009 ), the population has changed at a rate of 25%. It has changed at a rate of 17.9% due to migration and at a rate of 6.3% due to births and deaths.

Most of the population (as of 2000), speaks French (315 or 85.1%), with German being second most common (30 or 8.1%), and Portuguese being third (10 or 2.7%). There are two people who speak Italian.

Of the population in the municipality, 88 or about 23.8%, were born in Bougy-Villars and lived there in 2000. There were 100 or 27.0% who were born in the same canton, while 93 or 25.1% were born somewhere else in Switzerland, and 81 or 21.9% were born outside of Switzerland.

In 2008, there were 6 live births to Swiss citizens and were four deaths of Swiss citizens. Ignoring immigration and emigration, the population of Swiss citizens increased by two while the foreign population remained the same. There were four non-Swiss men and one non-Swiss woman who immigrated from another country to Switzerland. The total Swiss population change in 2008 (from all sources, including moves across municipal borders) was an increase of one and the non-Swiss population increased by four people. This represents a population growth rate of 1.1%.

The age distribution, as of 2009, in Bougy-Villars is; 56 children or 12.2% of the population are between 0 and 9 years old and 60 teenagers or 13.1% are between 10 and 19. Of the adult population, 30 people or 6.5% of the population are between 20 and 29 years old. 52 people or 11.3% are between 30 and 39, 84 people or 18.3% are between 40 and 49, and 70 people or 15.3% are between 50 and 59. The senior population distribution is 60 people or 13.1% of the population are between 60 and 69 years old, 37 people or 8.1% are between 70 and 79, there are 9 people or 2.0% who are between 80 and 89, and there is one person who is 90 and older.

As of 2000, there were 132 people who were single and never married in the municipality. There were 200 married individuals, 21 widows or widowers and 17 individuals who are divorced.

As of 2000, there were 152 private households in the municipality, and an average of 2.4 persons per household. There were 44 households that consist of only one person and 12 households with five or more people. Out of a total of 154 households that answered this question, 28.6% were households made up of just one person and there was one adult who lived with their parents. Of the rest of the households, there are 53 married couples without children, 45 married couples with children There were five single parents with a child or children. There were 4 households that were made up of unrelated people and two households that were made up of some sort of institution or another collective housing.

In 2000, there were 106 single family homes (or 70.7% of the total) out of a total of 150 inhabited buildings. There were 20 multi-family buildings (13.3%), along with 16 multi-purpose buildings that were mostly used for housing (10.7%) and eight other use buildings (commercial or industrial) that also had some housing (5.3%). Of the single family homes, 23 were built before 1919, while eight were built between 1990 and 2000. The most multi-family homes (eight) were built before 1919 and the next most (four) were built between 1991 and 1995.

In 2000, there were 188 apartments in the municipality. The most common apartment size was four rooms of which there were 36. There were 11 single room apartments and 98 apartments with five or more rooms. Of these apartments, a total of 144 apartments (76.6% of the total) were permanently occupied, while 31 apartments (16.5%) were seasonally occupied and 13 apartments (6.9%) were empty. As of 2009, the construction rate of new housing units was 13 new units per 1000 residents. The vacancy rate for the municipality, in 2010, was 0%.

The historical population is given in the following chart:

== Sights ==
The entire village of Bougy-Villars is designated as part of the Inventory of Swiss Heritage Sites.

== Politics ==
In the 2007 federal election, the most popular party was the SVP which received 29.02% of the vote. The next three most popular parties were the FDP (21.63%), the SP (14.33%) and the Green Party (10.52%). In the federal election, a total of 127 votes were cast, and the voter turnout was 51.2%.

== Economy ==
As of 2010, Bougy-Villars had an unemployment rate of 4.8%. As of 2008, there were 54 people employed in the primary economic sector and about 6 businesses involved in this sector. 19 people were employed in the secondary sector and there was one business in this sector. 95 people were employed in the tertiary sector, with 19 businesses in this sector. There were 178 residents of the municipality who were employed in some capacity, of which females made up 41.0% of the workforce.

In 2008, the total number of full-time equivalent jobs was 113. The number of jobs in the primary sector was 32, all of which were in agriculture. The number of jobs in the secondary sector was 10, all of which were in manufacturing. The number of jobs in the tertiary sector was 71. In the tertiary sector; 2 or 2.8% were in wholesale or retail sales or the repair of motor vehicles, 41 or 57.7% were in a hotel or restaurant, one was in the information industry, 13 or 18.3% were technical professionals or scientists.

In 2000, there were 53 workers who commuted into the municipality and 128 workers who commuted away. The municipality is a net exporter of workers, with about 2.4 workers leaving the municipality for every one entering. About 9.4% of the workforce coming into Bougy-Villars are coming from outside Switzerland. Of the working population, 7.3% used public transportation to get to work, and 66.9% used a private car.

This village is also home to one of the best chocolate makers in Switzerland, called "Tristan" as well as several local wine producers that sell their product in their cellars.

== Religion ==
From the 2000 census, 111 or 30.0% were Roman Catholic, while 190 or 51.4% belonged to the Swiss Reformed Church. Of the rest of the population, there were two members of an Orthodox church (or about 0.54% of the population), and there was one individual who belongs to another Christian church. 55 (or about 14.86% of the population) belonged to no church, are agnostic or atheist, and 11 individuals (or about 2.97% of the population) did not answer the question.

== Education ==
In Bougy-Villars, about 116 or (31.4%) of the population have completed non-mandatory upper secondary education, and 107 or (28.9%) have completed additional higher education (either university or a Fachhochschule). Of the 107 who completed tertiary schooling, 52.3% were Swiss men, 24.3% were Swiss women, 14.0% were non-Swiss men and 9.3% were non-Swiss women.

In the 2009/2010 school year, there were a total of 40 students in the Bougy-Villars school district. In the Vaud cantonal school system, two years of non-obligatory pre-school are provided by the political districts. During the school year, the political district provided pre-school care for a total of 631 children of which 203 children (32.2%) received subsidized pre-school care. The canton's primary school program requires students to attend for four years. There were 16 students in the municipal primary school program. The obligatory lower secondary school program lasts for six years and there were 24 students in those schools.

As of 2000, there were five students in Bougy-Villars who came from another municipality, while 60 residents attended schools outside the municipality.

== Notable residents ==
- Sébastien Loeb, French, professional racer and world champion in the World Rally Championship.
- John Reece, British, billionaire businessman and CFO of Ineos.
