= Mont-sur-Rolle =

- Municipality
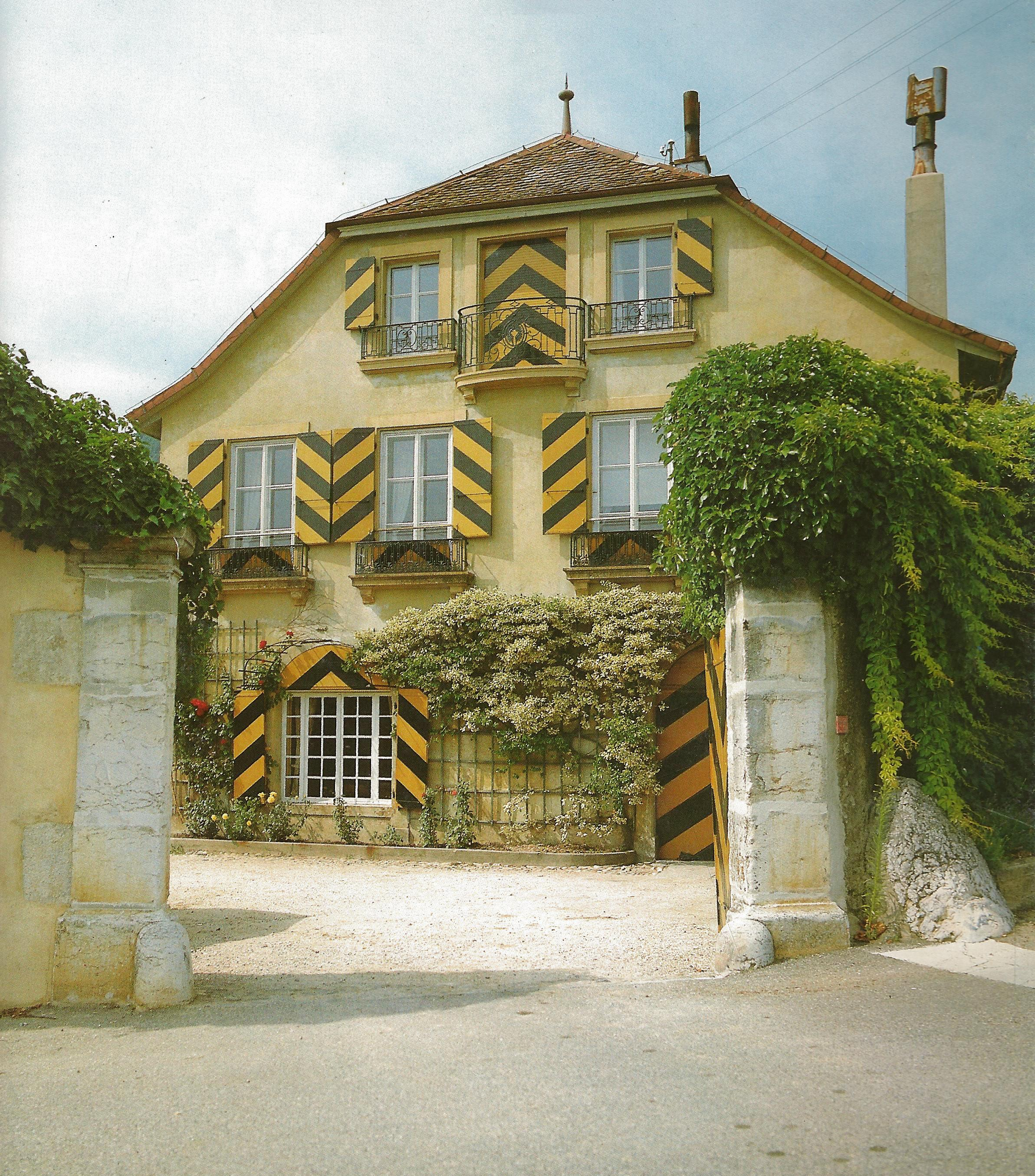

- Flag Coat of arms
- Location of Mont-sur-Rolle
- Location within Switzerland Location within Canton of Vaud
- Coordinates: 46°28′N 06°20′E
- Country: Switzerland
- Canton: Vaud
- District: Nyon

Government
  - Mayor: Syndic; Hubert Monnard

Area
  - Total: 3.89 km^{2} (1.50 sq mi)
- Elevation: 464 m (1,522 ft)

Population (2004)
  - Total: 1,854
  - Density: 477/km^{2} (1,230/sq mi)
- Demonym(s): Les Montois; Lè Rapelyon
- Time zone: UTC+01:00 (CET)
  - Summer (DST): UTC+02:00 (CEST)
- Postal code: 1185
- SFOS number: 5859
- ISO 3166 code: CH-VD
- Surrounded by: Bougy-Villars, Perroy, Rolle, Essertines-sur-Rolle
- Website: http://www.mont-sur-rolle.ch/

Mont-sur-Rolle (French pronunciation: [mɔ̃ syʁ ʁɔl], literally Mont on Rolle) is a municipality in the district of Nyon in the canton of Vaud in Switzerland. It is located 2–3 kilometres (1–2 miles) from the shores of Lac Léman (Lake Geneva), above the lake-side town of Rolle. The area is famed for its wine-making fields which has a distinctive fizzy-fruit flavour.

== History ==
Mont-sur-Rolle is first mentioned around 994-1021 as Monte.

== Geography ==
Aerial view from 300 m by Walter Mittelholzer (1930)

Mont-sur-Rolle has an area, as of 2009, of 3.9 square kilometers (1.5 mi^{2}). Of this area, 2.25 square kilometres (0.87 mi^{2}) or 58.4% is used for agricultural purposes, while 0.57 square kilometres (0.22 mi^{2}) or 14.8% is forested. Of the rest of the land, 1.03 km^{2} (0.40 mi^{2}) or 26.8% is settled (buildings or roads), 0.01 square kilometres (2.47 acres) or 0.3% is either rivers or lakes and 0.01 square kilometres (2.47 acres) or 0.3% is unproductive land.

Of the built up area, housing and buildings made up 11.4% and transportation infrastructure made up 7.0%. Power and water infrastructure as well as other special developed areas made up 2.9% of the area while parks, green belts and sports fields made up 5.5%. Out of the forested land, 11.7% of the total land area is heavily forested and 3.1% is covered with orchards or small clusters of trees. Of the agricultural land, 15.8% is used for growing crops and 7.5% is pastures, while 35.1% is used for orchards or vine crops. All the water in the municipality is in lakes.

The municipality was part of the Rolle District until it was dissolved on 31 August 2006, and Mont-sur-Rolle became part of the new district of Nyon.

The municipality consists of the village of Mont-sur-Rolle and the hamlets of L'Abbaye, Crochet, Germagny, Haute-Cour and Mont-Dessus.

== Coat of arms ==
The blazon of the municipal coat of arms is Tierced per bend sinister Vert, Gules, Or, in base a Mount Vert.

== Demographics ==
Mont-sur-Rolle has a population (as of December 2020) of 2,658. As of 2008, 25.4% of the population are resident foreign nationals. Over the last 10 years (1999–2009 ) the population has changed at a rate of 38.5%. It has changed at a rate of 32.6% due to migration and at a rate of 6.7% due to births and deaths.

Most of the population (as of 2000) speaks French (1,491 or 83.0%), with German being second most common (112 or 6.2%) and English being third (53 or 3.0%). There are 50 people who speak Italian.

The age distribution, as of 2009, in Mont-sur-Rolle is; 322 children or 13.7% of the population are between 0 and 9 years old and 295 teenagers or 12.6% are between 10 and 19. Of the adult population, 201 people or 8.6% of the population are between 20 and 29 years old. 370 people or 15.8% are between 30 and 39, 443 people or 18.9% are between 40 and 49, and 314 people or 13.4% are between 50 and 59. The senior population distribution is 206 people or 8.8% of the population are between 60 and 69 years old, 129 people or 5.5% are between 70 and 79, there are 52 people or 2.2% who are between 80 and 89, and there are 14 people or 0.6% who are 90 and older.

As of 2000, there were 718 people who were single and never married in the municipality. There were 900 married individuals, 67 widows or widowers and 111 individuals who are divorced.

As of 2000, there were 717 private households in the municipality, and an average of 2.4 persons per household. There were 204 households that consist of only one person and 38 households with five or more people. Out of a total of 733 households that answered this question, 27.8% were households made up of just one person and there were 7 adults who lived with their parents. Of the rest of the households, there are 196 married couples without children, 258 married couples with children There were 43 single parents with a child or children. There were 9 households that were made up of unrelated people and 16 households that were made up of some sort of institution or another collective housing.

In 2000 there were 210 single family homes (or 56.1% of the total) out of a total of 374 inhabited buildings. There were 85 multi-family buildings (22.7%), along with 67 multi-purpose buildings that were mostly used for housing (17.9%) and 12 other use buildings (commercial or industrial) that also had some housing (3.2%).

In 2000, a total of 695 apartments (84.0% of the total) were permanently occupied, while 111 apartments (13.4%) were seasonally occupied and 21 apartments (2.5%) were empty. As of 2009, the construction rate of new housing units was 3.8 new units per 1000 residents. The vacancy rate for the municipality, in 2010, was 1.74%.

The historical population is given in the following chart:

== Sights ==
The entire village of Mont-sur-Rolle is designated as part of the Inventory of Swiss Heritage Sites.

== Twin towns – sister cities ==
Mont-sur-Rolle is twinned with:

- Prarostino, Italy

== Politics ==
In the 2007 federal election the most popular party was the SVP which received 28.9% of the vote. The next three most popular parties were the FDP (19.41%), the SP (16.34%) and the Green Party (11.61%). In the federal election, a total of 569 votes were cast, and the voter turnout was 45.9%.

== Economy ==
As of 2010, Mont-sur-Rolle had an unemployment rate of 5%. As of 2008, there were 145 people employed in the primary economic sector and about 36 businesses involved in this sector. 22 people were employed in the secondary sector and there were 7 businesses in this sector. 106 people were employed in the tertiary sector, with 26 businesses in this sector. There were 937 residents of the municipality who were employed in some capacity, of which females made up 44.9% of the workforce.

In 2008 the total number of full-time equivalent jobs was 223. The number of jobs in the primary sector was 119, all of which were in agriculture. The number of jobs in the secondary sector was 21 of which 8 or (38.1%) were in manufacturing and 13 (61.9%) were in construction. The number of jobs in the tertiary sector was 83. In the tertiary sector; 2 or 2.4% were in wholesale or retail sales or the repair of motor vehicles, 5 or 6.0% were in the movement and storage of goods, 5 or 6.0% were in a hotel or restaurant, 2 or 2.4% were in the information industry, 6 or 7.2% were the insurance or financial industry, 10 or 12.0% were technical professionals or scientists, 15 or 18.1% were in education and 33 or 39.8% were in health care.

In 2000, there were 179 workers who commuted into the municipality and 761 workers who commuted away. The municipality is a net exporter of workers, with about 4.3 workers leaving the municipality for every one entering. About 5.6% of the workforce coming into Mont-sur-Rolle are coming from outside Switzerland. Of the working population, 14.4% used public transportation to get to work, and 66.9% used a private car.

== Religion ==
From the 2000 census, 525 or 29.2% were Roman Catholic, while 781 or 43.5% belonged to the Swiss Reformed Church. Of the rest of the population, there were 26 members of an Orthodox church (or about 1.45% of the population), there was 1 individual who belongs to the Christian Catholic Church, and there were 136 individuals (or about 7.57% of the population) who belonged to another Christian church. There was 1 individual who was Jewish, and 8 (or about 0.45% of the population) who were Islamic. There were 5 individuals who were Buddhist and 4 individuals who belonged to another church. 263 (or about 14.64% of the population) belonged to no church, are agnostic or atheist, and 112 individuals (or about 6.24% of the population) did not answer the question.

== Education ==
In Mont-sur-Rolle about 625 or (34.8%) of the population have completed non-mandatory upper secondary education, and 341 or (19.0%) have completed additional higher education (either university or a Fachhochschule). Of the 341 who completed tertiary schooling, 44.6% were Swiss men, 28.4% were Swiss women, 13.2% were non-Swiss men and 13.8% were non-Swiss women.

In the 2009/2010 school year there were a total of 310 students in the Mont-sur-Rolle school district. In the Vaud cantonal school system, two years of non-obligatory pre-school are provided by the political districts. During the school year, the political district provided pre-school care for a total of 1,249 children of which 563 children (45.1%) received subsidized pre-school care. The canton's primary school program requires students to attend for four years. There were 159 students in the municipal primary school program. The obligatory lower secondary school program lasts for six years and there were 146 students in those schools. There were also 5 students who were home schooled or attended another non-traditional school.

As of 2000, there were 131 students in Mont-sur-Rolle who came from another municipality, while 169 residents attended schools outside the municipality.

La Côte International School was previously in Mont-sur-Rolle.

== Notable residents ==
- Fernando Alonso, Spanish Formula One driver
