= Aubonne (river) =

River in Switzerland

Coordinates: 46°27′35″N 6°23′29″E

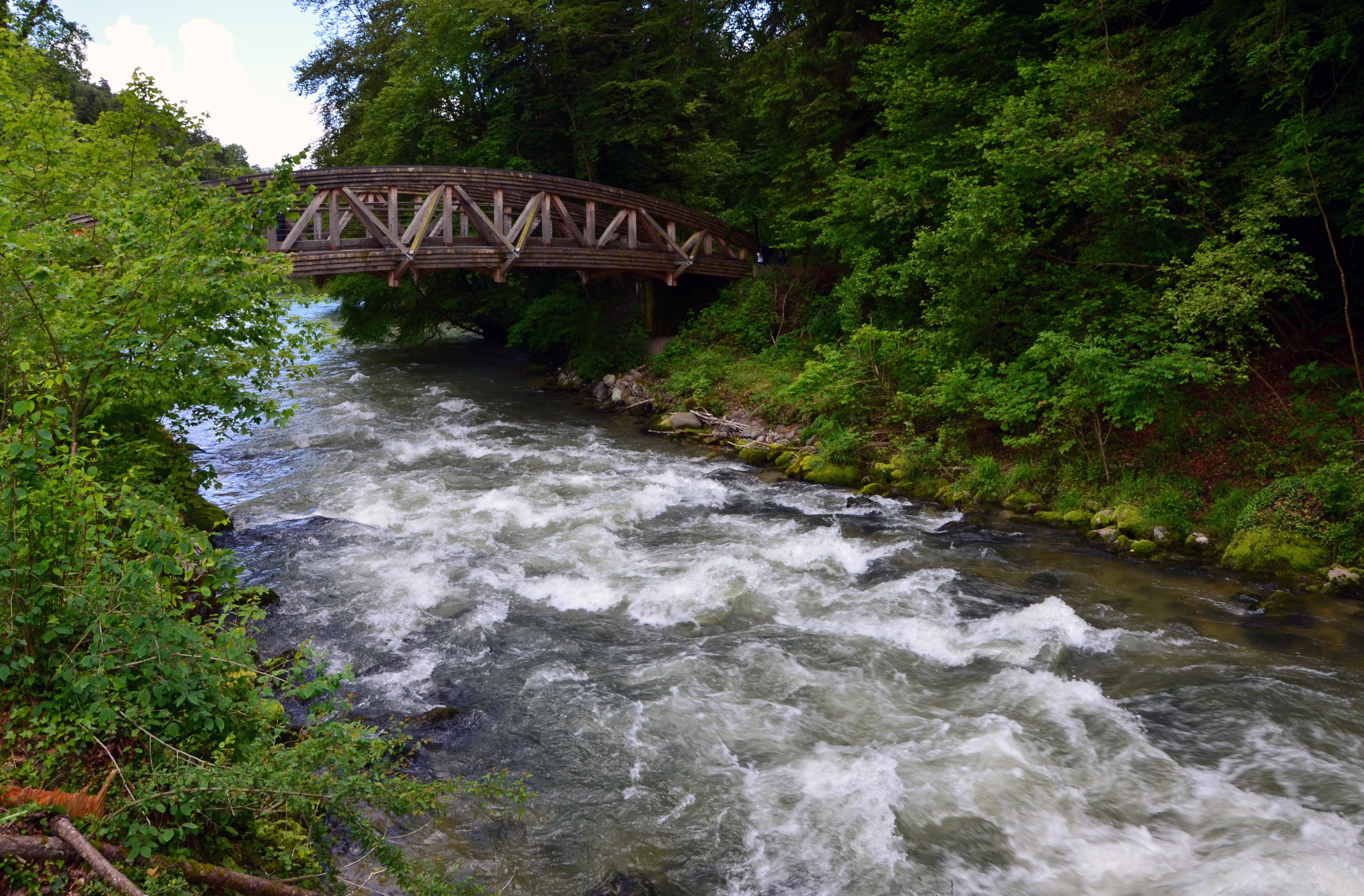
- Aubonne at Arboretum

Location
- Country: Switzerland
- Canton: Vaud

Physical characteristics
- Source
  - location: Monts de Bière near Bière
  - elevation: 700 m (2,300 ft)
- Mouth
  - location: Lake Geneva at Aubonne
  - elevation: 372 m (1,220 ft)
- Length: 12.2 km (7.6 mi)
- Basin size: 96.3 km^{2} (37.2 sq mi)

Basin features
- Progression: Rhône→ Mediterranean Sea

Aubonne (French pronunciation: [obɔn]) is a river in the canton of Vaud, Switzerland. It rises near Bière and flows into Lake Geneva (Lac Léman) near Aubonne.

== See also ==
- List of rivers in Switzerland
