= Aubonne Castle =

Castle in Aubonne, Switzerland

- Château d'Aubonne
- Aubonne
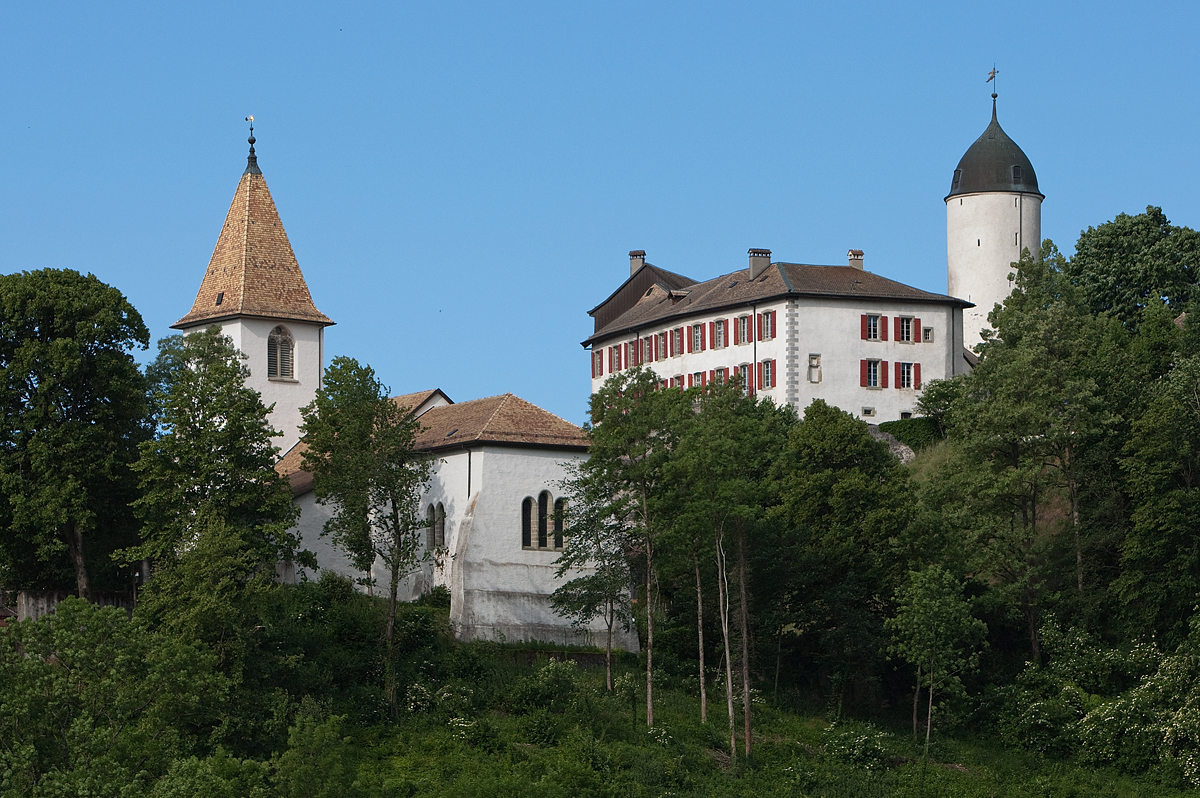
- The castle and church of Aubonne

Location
- Coordinates: 46°29′48″N 6°23′29″E

Site history
- Built: 11th century

Aubonne Castle is a castle in the municipality of Aubonne of the Canton of Vaud in Switzerland. It is a Swiss heritage site of national significance.

== See also ==
- List of castles in Switzerland
- Château
