= Aubonne =

- Municipality
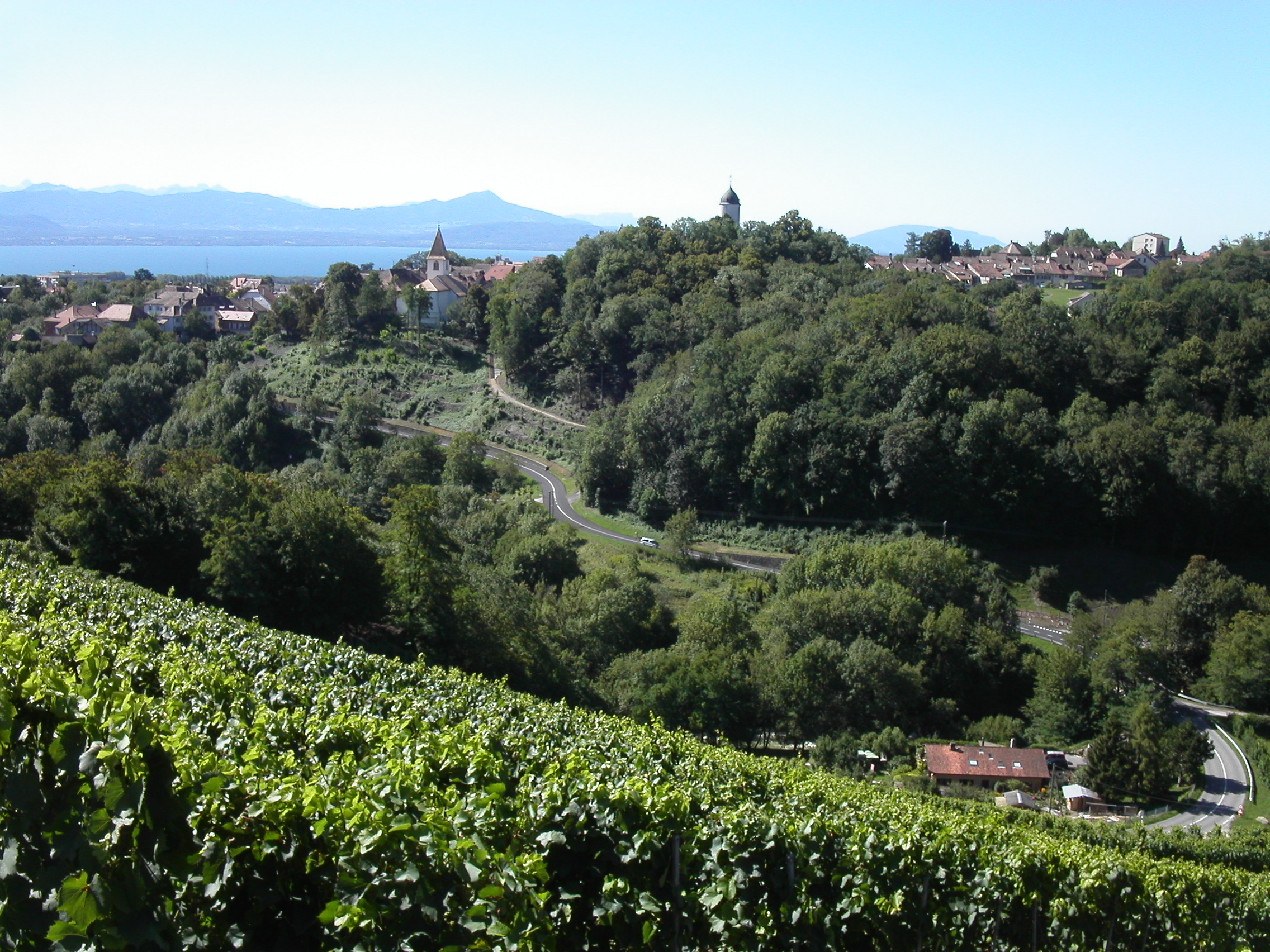
- Aubonne

- Flag Coat of arms
- Location of Aubonne
- Location within Switzerland Location within Canton of Vaud
- Coordinates: 46°30′N 06°23′E
- Country: Switzerland
- Canton: Vaud
- District: Morges

Government
  - Mayor: Syndic; Pierre-Alain Blanc

Area
  - Total: 6.87 km^{2} (2.65 sq mi)
- Elevation: 508 m (1,667 ft)

Population (2003)
  - Total: 2,650
  - Density: 386/km^{2} (999/sq mi)
- Demonym: Les Aubonnois
- Time zone: UTC+01:00 (CET)
  - Summer (DST): UTC+02:00 (CEST)
- Postal code: 1170
- SFOS number: 5422
- ISO 3166 code: CH-VD
- Localities: Trévelin, Bougy-Saint-Martin
- Surrounded by: Allaman, Féchy, Pizy, Saint-Livres, Lavigny, Etoy
- Website: aubonne.ch

Aubonne (French pronunciation: [obɔn]) is a municipality in the district of Morges in the canton of Vaud in Switzerland. In 2011 the former municipality of Pizy merged into Aubonne and on 1 January 2021 Montherod merged into it.

== History ==
Aerial view from 400 m by Walter Mittelholzer (1919)

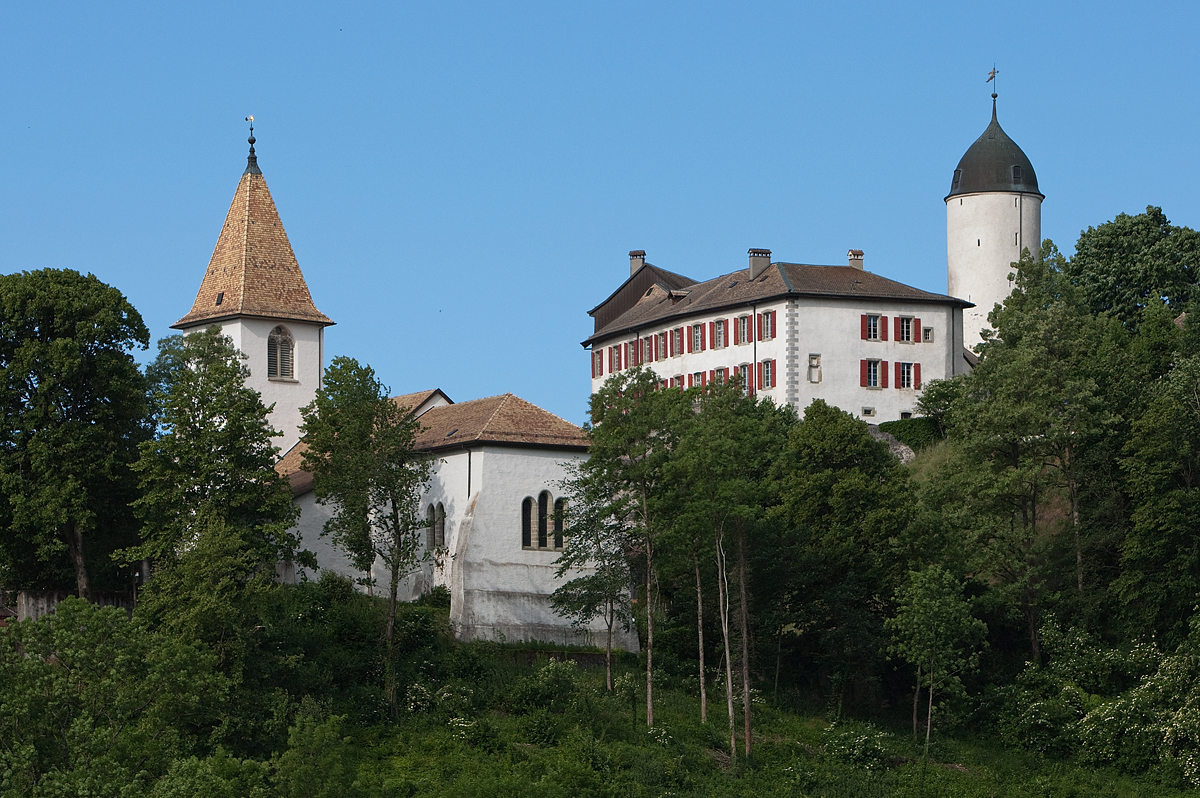
Church and castle with its minaret-style tower, built 1680 for Jean-Baptiste Tavernier, at Aubonne

The municipality was settled very early. The oldest remains are from the Bronze Age. From Roman times, there remain foundations of villas, and from early medieval times, graves.

The first documentation of the municipality is from 1177 under the name of Albona. In the first half of the 13th century, a defensive wall was built around the town. In 1255, the town was sold to Count Peter II of Savoy. He gave the governing of the town over to the family of Thoire-Villars. Aubonne was the most important town on the north side of the lake between Lausanne and Geneva until the second half of the 15th century. Since the 13th century, it had weekly markets, and starting in 1487 semi-annual three-day markets.

The Count of Greyerz acquired Aubonne in 1393. Since he was allied with the Eidgenossen, the municipality was spared the ravages of the Burgundian Wars in 1476. When the canton of Vaud was conquered by Bern in 1536, Aubonne came under Bernese domination, but still belonged to the Count of Greyerz until 1553.

In 1670, the city was bought by the Frenchman Jean-Baptiste Tavernier, and in 1685 by Henri Duquesne, who sold it to Bern again in 1701. From 1798 to 1803 it belonged to the canton of Léman in the Helvetic Republic, which, through the mediation of Napoleon became the canton of Vaud. Aubonne was the capital of its district from 1803 until 2006.

On 5 December 2017, Michael I of Romania died in his home in Aubonne.

=== Montherod ===
Montherod was first mentioned in about 1344 as Monterot.

== Geography ==
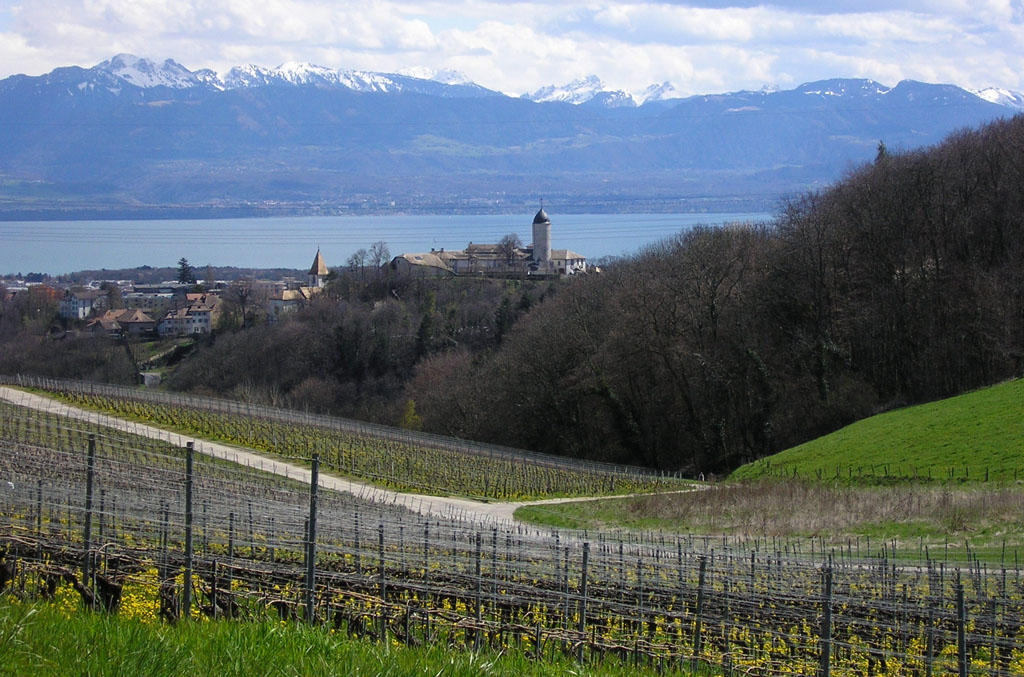
A view of Aubonne

Aubonne lies at an elevation of 508 m (1,667 ft). 19 km (12 mi) west of Lausanne. It is spread in the valley of the river Aubonne, on the edge of the Jura foothill plateau, about 130 m (430 ft) above the surface of Lake Geneva.

The highest point in the municipality is at an elevation of 643 m (2,110 ft)

The villages of Trévelin and Bougy-Saint-Martin belong to the municipality. The surrounding municipalities are Allaman, Féchy, Pizy, Montherod, Saint-Livres, Lavigny, and Etoy.

Aubonne has an area, (as of the 2004/09 survey), of 14.36 km^{2} (5.54 sq mi). Of this area, 4.35 km^{2} (1.68 sq mi) or 63.3% is used for agricultural purposes, while 0.97 km^{2} (0.37 sq mi) or 14.1% is forested. Of the rest of the land, 1.52 km^{2} (0.59 sq mi) or 22.1% is settled (buildings or roads), 0.05 km^{2} (12 acres) or 0.7% is either rivers or lakes and 0.03 km^{2} (7.4 acres) or 0.4% is unproductive land.

Of the built up area, industrial buildings made up 2.0% of the total area while housing and buildings made up 9.9% and transportation infrastructure made up 6.4%. Power and water infrastructure as well as other special developed areas made up 1.6% of the area while parks, green belts and sports fields made up 2.2%. Out of the forested land, 11.1% of the total land area is heavily forested and 3.1% is covered with orchards or small clusters of trees. Of the agricultural land, 33.2% is used for growing crops and 8.3% is pastures, while 21.8% is used for orchards or vine crops. All the water in the municipality is flowing water.

The municipality was the capital of the Aubonne District until it was dissolved on 31 August 2006, and Aubonne became part of the new district of Morges.

== Coat of arms ==
The blazon of the municipal coat of arms is Per pale Gules and Or.

== Demographics ==
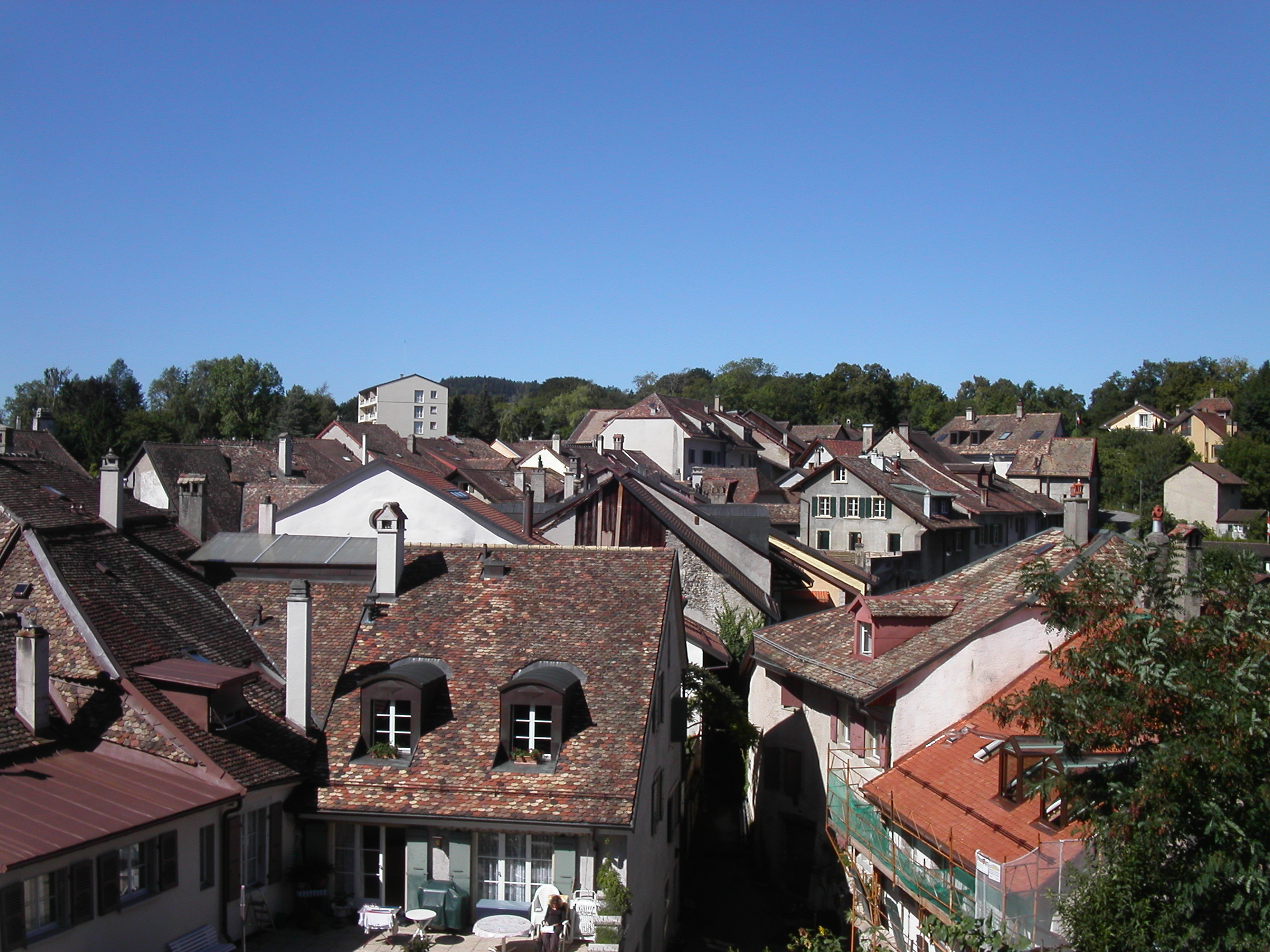
A view over Aubonne

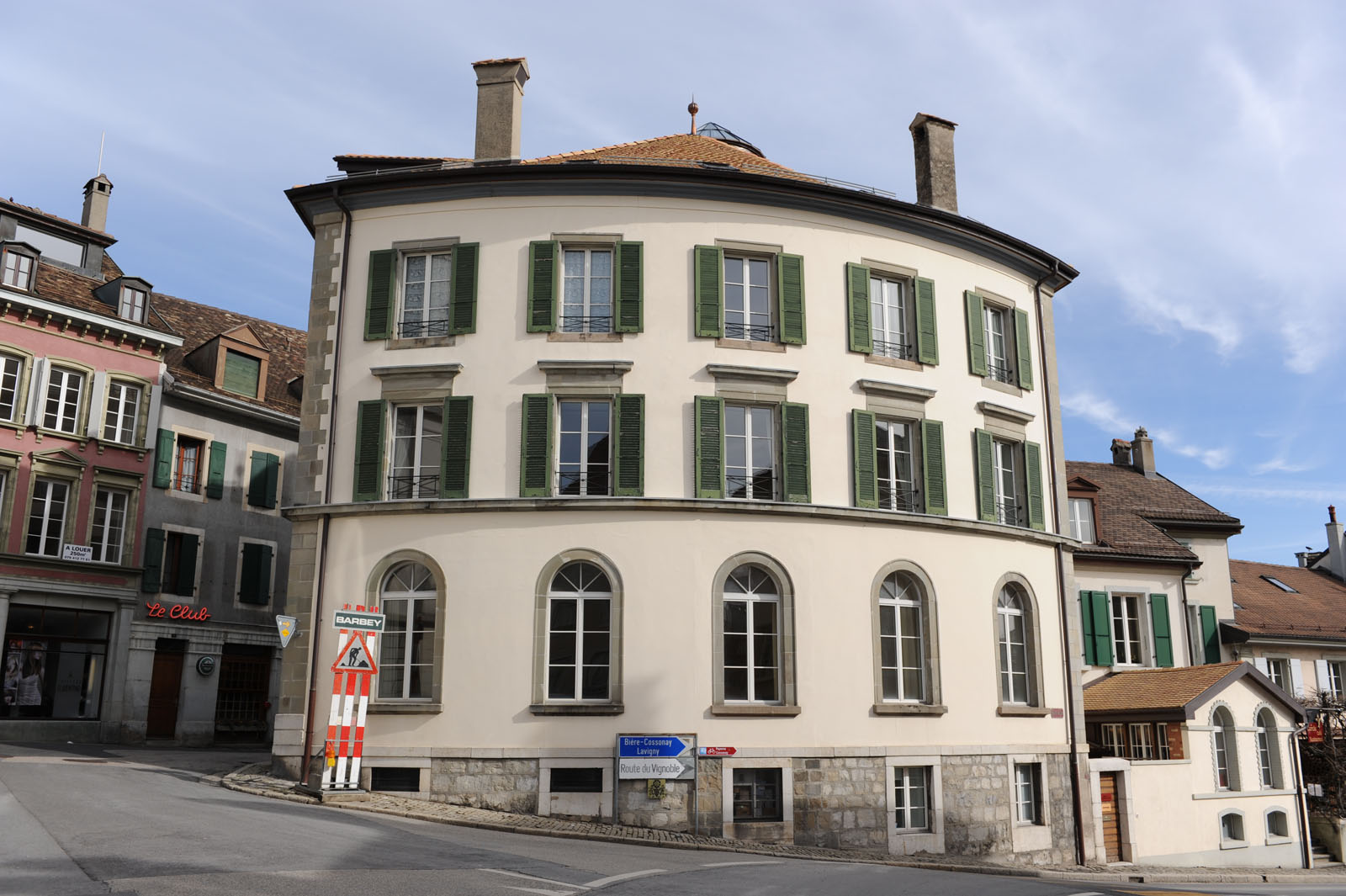
Apartment buildings in Aubonne

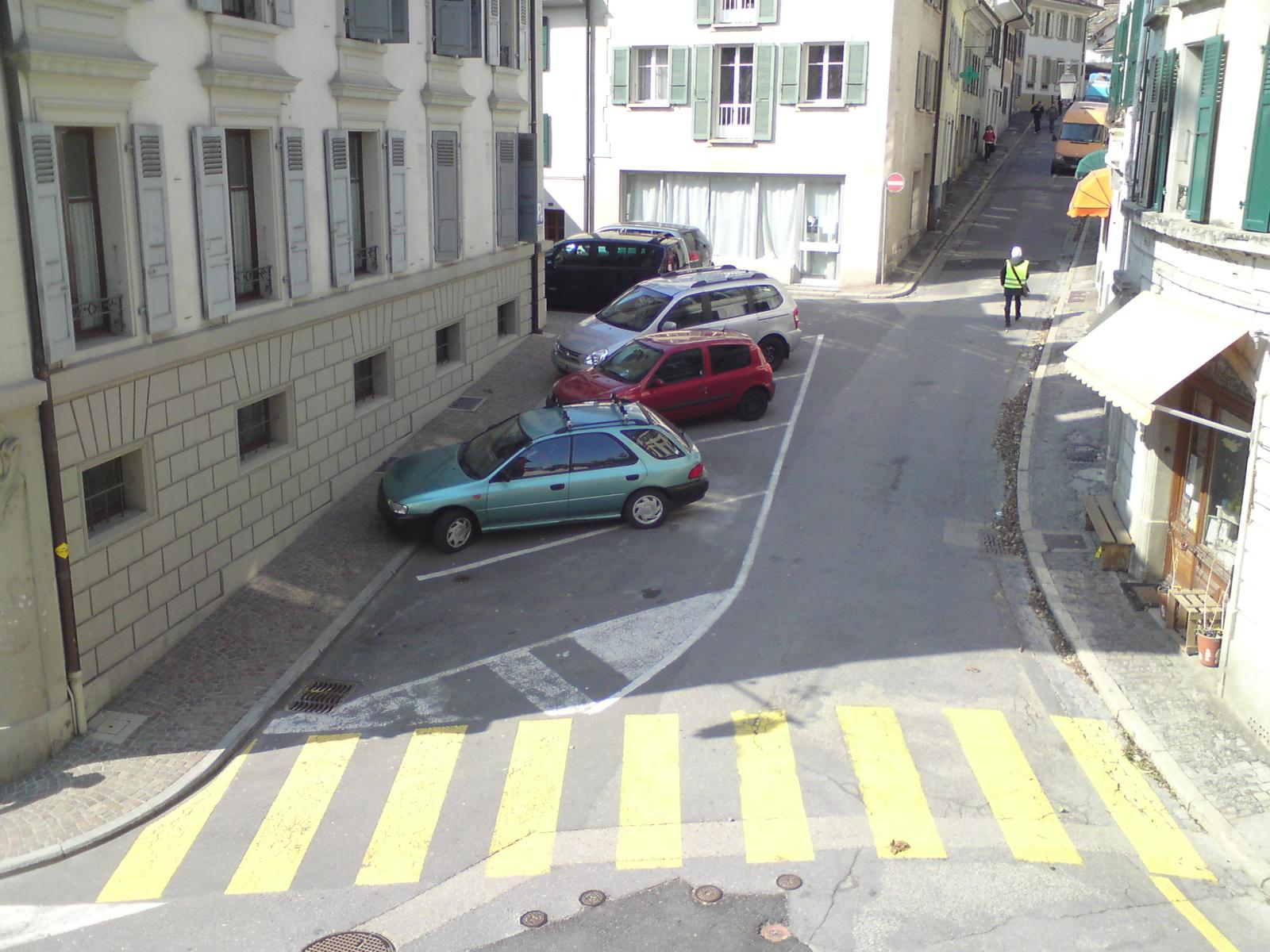
Streets in the older part of town

Aubonne has a population (as of December 2020) of 3,235. As of 2008, 24.7% of the population are resident foreign nationals. Over the last 10 years (1999–2009) the population has changed at a rate of 5.9%. It has changed at a rate of 2.3% due to migration and at a rate of 3.8% due to births and deaths.

Most of the population (as of 2000) speaks French (2,160 or 84.0%), with German being second most common (133 or 5.2%) and Portuguese being third (93 or 3.6%). There are 86 people who speak Italian and 4 people who speak Romansh.

Of the population in the municipality 623 or about 24.2% were born in Aubonne and lived there in 2000. There were 842 or 32.8% who were born in the same canton, while 456 or 17.7% were born somewhere else in Switzerland, and 563 or 21.9% were born outside of Switzerland.

In 2008 there were 17 live births to Swiss citizens and 8 births to non-Swiss citizens, and in same time span there were 15 deaths of Swiss citizens and 1 non-Swiss citizen death. Ignoring immigration and emigration, the population of Swiss citizens increased by 2 while the foreign population increased by 7. There were 6 Swiss men and 5 Swiss women who emigrated from Switzerland. At the same time, there were 26 non-Swiss men and 36 non-Swiss women who immigrated from another country to Switzerland. The total Swiss population change in 2008 (from all sources, including moves across municipal borders) was an increase of 11 and the non-Swiss population increased by 41 people. This represents a population growth rate of 1.9%.

The age distribution, as of 2009, in Aubonne is; 301 children or 11.0% of the population are between 0 and 9 years old and 345 teenagers or 12.6% are between 10 and 19. Of the adult population, 266 people or 9.7% of the population are between 20 and 29 years old. 374 people or 13.7% are between 30 and 39, 471 people or 17.2% are between 40 and 49, and 381 people or 13.9% are between 50 and 59. The senior population distribution is 292 people or 10.7% of the population are between 60 and 69 years old, 164 people or 6.0% are between 70 and 79, there are 117 people or 4.3% who are between 80 and 89, and there are 22 people or 0.8% who are 90 and older.

As of 2000, there were 1,048 people who were single and never married in the municipality. There were 1,258 married individuals, 150 widows or widowers and 114 individuals who are divorced.

As of 2000, there were 1,102 private households in the municipality, and an average of 2.3 persons per household. There were 379 households that consist of only one person and 67 households with five or more people. Out of a total of 1,128 households that answered this question, 33.6% were households made up of just one person and there were 9 adults who lived with their parents. Of the rest of the households, there are 306 married couples without children, 342 married couples with children There were 54 single parents with a child or children. There were 12 households that were made up of unrelated people and 26 households that were made up of some sort of institution or another collective housing.

In 2000 there were 271 single family homes (or 47.9% of the total) out of a total of 566 inhabited buildings. There were 138 multi-family buildings (24.4%), along with 110 multi-purpose buildings that were mostly used for housing (19.4%) and 47 other use buildings (commercial or industrial) that also had some housing (8.3%). Of the single family homes 80 were built before 1919, while 28 were built between 1990 and 2000. The most multi-family homes (70) were built before 1919 and the next most (22) were built between 1981 and 1990. There was 1 multi-family house built between 1996 and 2000.

In 2000 there were 1,252 apartments in the municipality. The most common apartment size was 3 rooms of which there were 375. There were 76 single room apartments and 336 apartments with five or more rooms. Of these apartments, a total of 1,075 apartments (85.9% of the total) were permanently occupied, while 145 apartments (11.6%) were seasonally occupied and 32 apartments (2.6%) were empty. As of 2009, the construction rate of new housing units was 2.9 new units per 1000 residents. The vacancy rate for the municipality, in 2010, was 1.2%.

The historical population is given in the following chart:

== Heritage sites of national significance ==
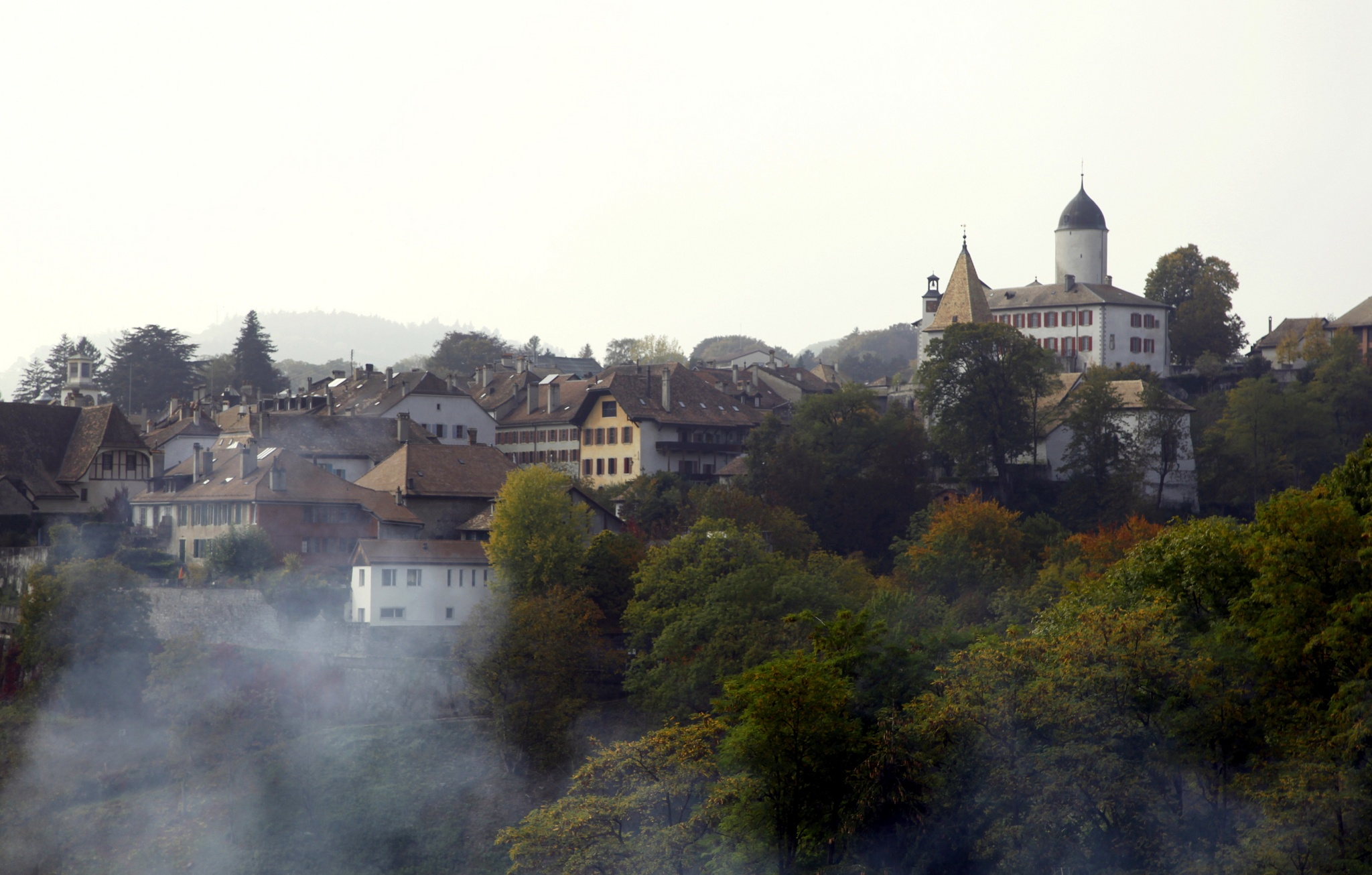
Aubonne Castle and Aubonne.

The Former Federal Powder Mill, Aubonne Castle, the City Hall and grenette, the D'Aspre House with Orangery, the Manoir et manège are listed as Swiss heritage site of national significance. The entire town of Aubonne and the Federal Powder Mill are listed as part of the Inventory of Swiss Heritage Sites.

== Tourism ==
A wood museum was opened in 1967. The first arboretum in the canton of Vaud was established in 1963 in Aubonne. It has an area of about 200 hectares and features both native and imported trees.

== Politics ==
In the 2007 federal election the most popular party was the SP which received 21.08% of the vote. The next three most popular parties were the SVP (17.1%), the FDP (15.81%) and the Green Party (13.72%). In the federal election, a total of 861 votes were cast, and the voter turnout was 52.6%.

== Economy ==
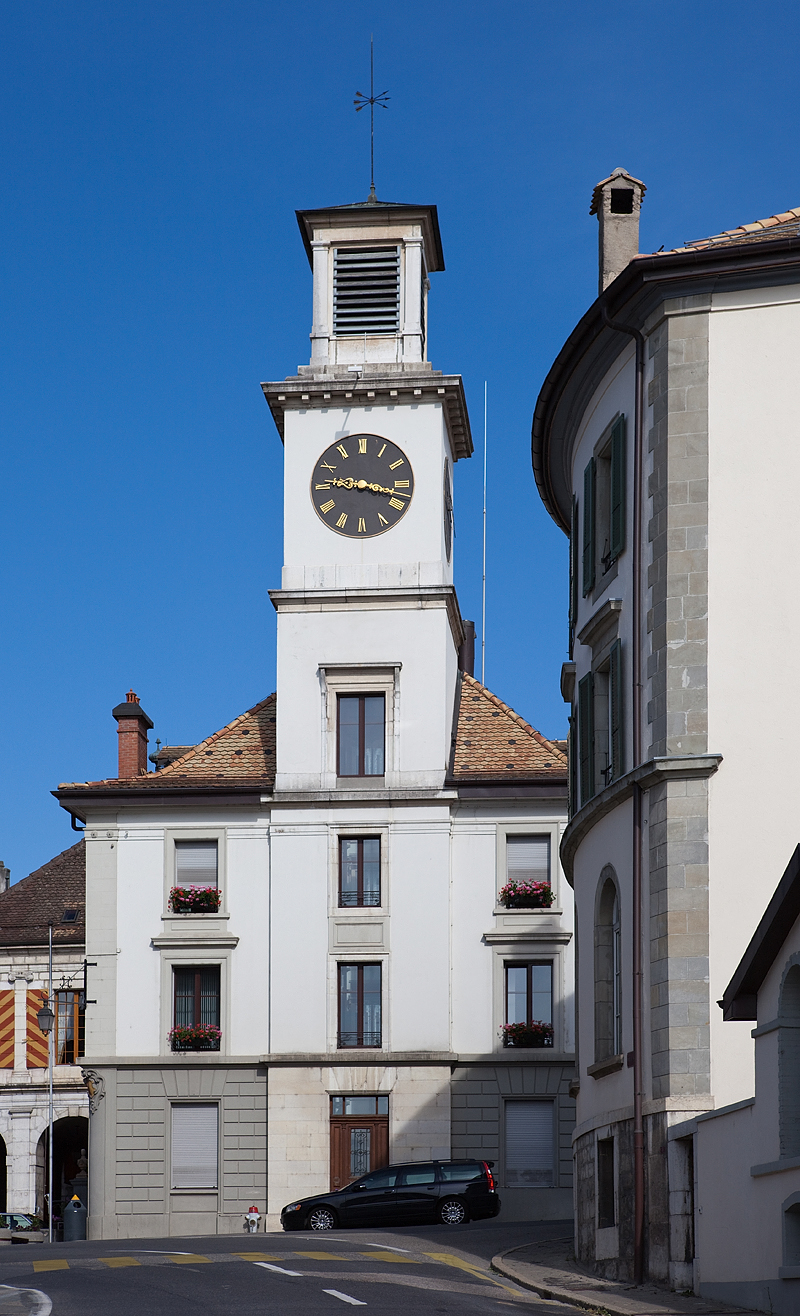
Hotel-de-Ville at Aubonne.

Aubonne was long an agricultural town. Today, however, agriculture plays a secondary role. Agricultural products of the region include wine.

Because Aubonne does not lie on the Lausanne–Geneva railway built in the 19th century, industrialization began relatively late. The first factory, a gunpowder factory, was built in 1853. In the 20th century, a precision machine shop, laboratories, furniture manufacturers, and pharmaceutical companies have come to Aubonne.

Today, the majority of jobs are in the service sector.

As of 2010, Aubonne had an unemployment rate of 3%. As of 2008, there were 110 people employed in the primary economic sector and about 22 businesses involved in this sector. 623 people were employed in the secondary sector and there were 39 businesses in this sector. 1,591 people were employed in the tertiary sector, with 191 businesses in this sector. There were 1,335 residents of the municipality who were employed in some capacity, of which females made up 44.9% of the workforce.

In 2008 the total number of full-time equivalent jobs was 1,882. The number of jobs in the primary sector was 70, all of which were in agriculture. The number of jobs in the secondary sector was 579 of which 404 or (69.8%) were in manufacturing and 137 (23.7%) were in construction. The number of jobs in the tertiary sector was 1,233. In the tertiary sector; 610 or 49.5% were in wholesale or retail sales or the repair of motor vehicles, 42 or 3.4% were in the movement and storage of goods, 39 or 3.2% were in a hotel or restaurant, 46 or 3.7% were in the information industry, 18 or 1.5% were the insurance or financial industry, 108 or 8.8% were technical professionals or scientists, 54 or 4.4% were in education and 185 or 15.0% were in health care.

In 2000, there were 1,533 workers who commuted into the municipality and 799 workers who commuted away. The municipality is a net importer of workers, with about 1.9 workers entering the municipality for every one leaving. About 3.9% of the workforce coming into Aubonne are coming from outside Switzerland. Of the working population, 11.2% used public transportation to get to work, and 62.4% used a private car.

== Religion ==
From the 2000 census, 761 or 29.6% were Roman Catholic, while 1,085 or 42.2% belonged to the Swiss Reformed Church. Of the rest of the population, there were 13 members of an Orthodox church (or about 0.51% of the population) and there were 156 individuals (or about 6.07% of the population) who belonged to another Christian church. There were 3 individuals (or about 0.12% of the population) who were Jewish and 33 (or about 1.28% of the population) who were Islamic. There were 4 individuals who were Buddhist, 1 person who was Hindu and 8 individuals who belonged to another church. 389 (or about 15.14% of the population) belonged to no church, are agnostic or atheist, and 117 individuals (or about 4.55% of the population) did not answer the question.

== Education ==
In Aubonne about 843 or (32.8%) of the population have completed non-mandatory upper secondary education, and 522 or (20.3%) have completed additional higher education (either university or a Fachhochschule). Of the 522 who completed tertiary schooling, 52.3% were Swiss men, 31.0% were Swiss women, 10.3% were non-Swiss men and 6.3% were non-Swiss women.

In the 2009/2010 school year there were a total of 341 students in the Aubonne school district. In the Vaud cantonal school system, two years of non-obligatory pre-school are provided by the political districts. During the school year, the political district provided pre-school care for a total of 631 children of which 203 children (32.2%) received subsidized pre-school care. The canton's primary school program requires students to attend for four years. There were 179 students in the municipal primary school program. The obligatory lower secondary school program lasts for six years and there were 157 students in those schools. There were also 5 students who were home schooled or attended another non-traditional school.

As of 2000, there were 412 students in Aubonne who came from another municipality, while 184 residents attended schools outside the municipality.

There is a private international school, La Côte International School.

== Transportation ==
Aubonne lies at the crossroads of the highway between Rolle and Cossonay and the highway between Allaman and Gimel. The entrance to the A1 motorway was opened in 1964 and is only about 2 km (1 mi) from the center.

The train station of the Lausanne-Geneva railway was opened on 14 April 1858 and lies just outside the municipality in Allaman. From 1896 to 1952, there was an electric tram from Allaman to Aubonne. Today, Aubonne is served by the bus line Allaman – Aubonne – Gimel. There are also postal buses to Rolle and Etoy.

== Notable people ==
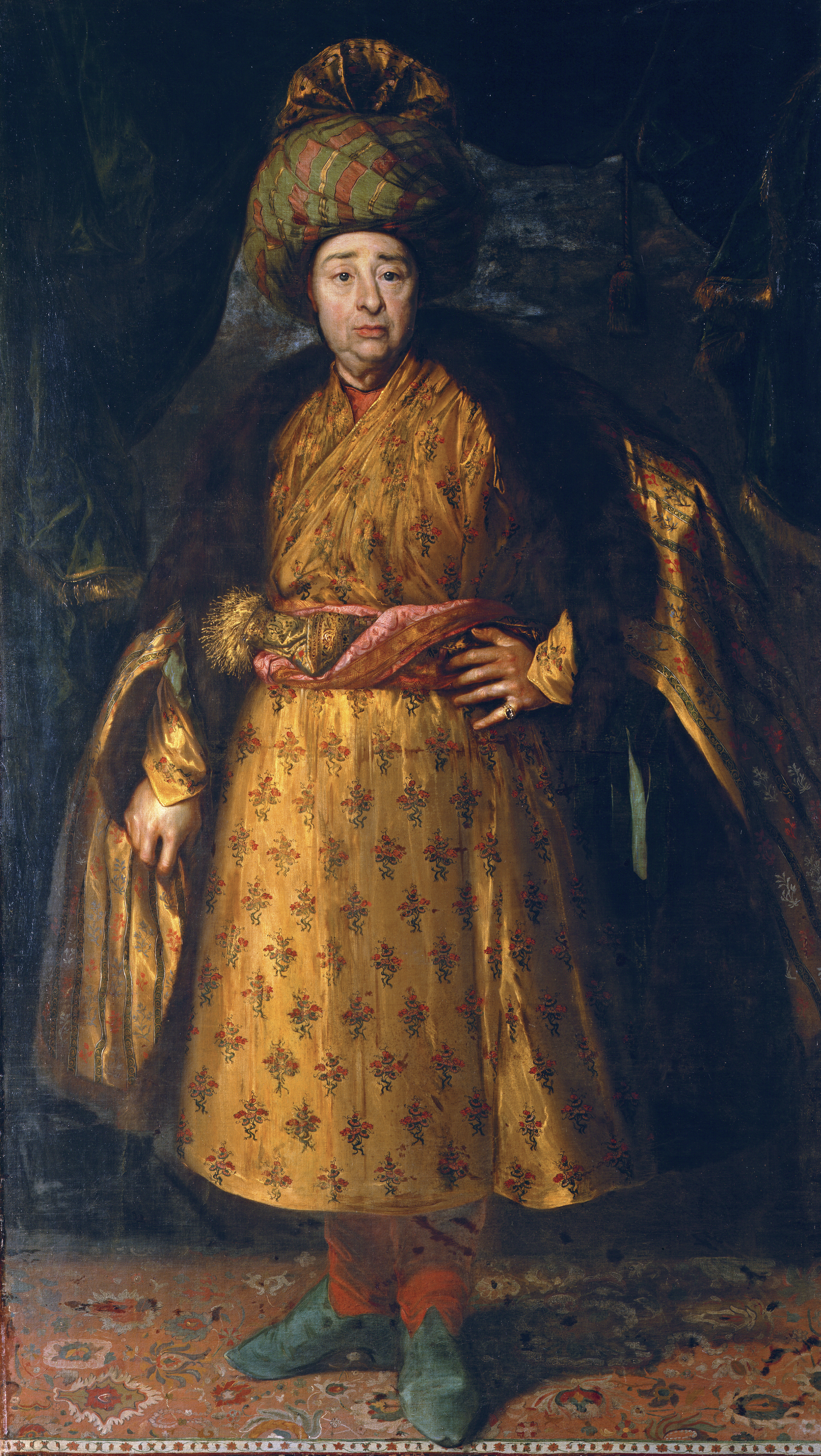
Jean-Baptist Tavernier, 1678

- Jean-Baptiste Tavernier (1605–1689), a 17th-century French gem merchant and traveler, owner of the seigneurery of Aubonne 1670 to 1685
- Alexandre Yersin (1863 in Aubonne – 1943), a Swiss and naturalized French physician and bacteriologist who discovered the bacillus of the plague or pest, born and lived in Aubonne
- Charles Ferdinand Ramuz (1878–1947), a French-speaking Swiss writer, studied in Aubonne
- Georges de Mestral (1907–1990), a Swiss electrical engineer who invented the hook and loop fastener and Velcro lived in Aubonne
- Agostino Giorgio Soldati (1910–1966), a Swiss diplomat, Ambassador of the Swiss Confederation to France and former owner of the Château de Trévelin
- Michael I of Romania (1921–2017 in Aubonne), the last King of Romania, had a residence in Aubonne
- Sibylle Blanc (born 1974 in Aubonne), a French-speaking Swiss actress and director´
