= Jean-Pierre Moulin =

Swiss journalist (1922–2023)

- Born: 11 January 1922; Lausanne, Switzerland
- Died: 8 December 2023 (aged 101); Paris, France
- Occupations: Journalist, writer
- Years active: 1946–2004

Jean-Pierre Moulin (11 January 1922 – 8 December 2023) was a Swiss journalist, writer, and author. He died in Paris on 8 December 2023, at the age of 101.

The son of Robert Moulin and Alice (née Antognini), he studied literature at Lausanne before settling in Paris in 1946, where he worked as a correspondent for the Swiss French-language press and later for Swiss French-language radio and television. He also wrote novels, essays, and works on French society, and contributed lyrics for chanson performers including Serge Reggiani and Édith Piaf.

== Career ==
Moulin studied literature at Lausanne and settled in Paris in 1946. He worked as a journalist for the Gazette de Lausanne and then the Tribune de Lausanne (now Le Matin). He was subsequently a correspondent for Radio suisse romande (RSR, 1947–1980) and Télévision suisse romande (TSR, 1976–1989), as well as a producer of radio and television programs.

== Writing ==
A translator of John McPhee, Moulin published works on French society, novels, and short stories. Connected to song from childhood, he created shows with his sister Béatrice Moulin (1926–2006), a singer and journalist, and with Charles Apothéloz and Franck Jotterand, notably at the théâtre des Faux-Nez in Lausanne. He wrote for performers including Serge Reggiani and Édith Piaf, and is the author of Une histoire de la chanson française. Des troubadours au rap (2004).

== Bibliography ==
- F. Fornerod, Lausanne, le temps des audaces, 1993
- Francillon, Littérature, 4, 448
- Plans-Fixes, [video], 2000
- 24 Heures, 14 April 2004
