= Jacques Pilet =

Swiss journalist (born 1943)

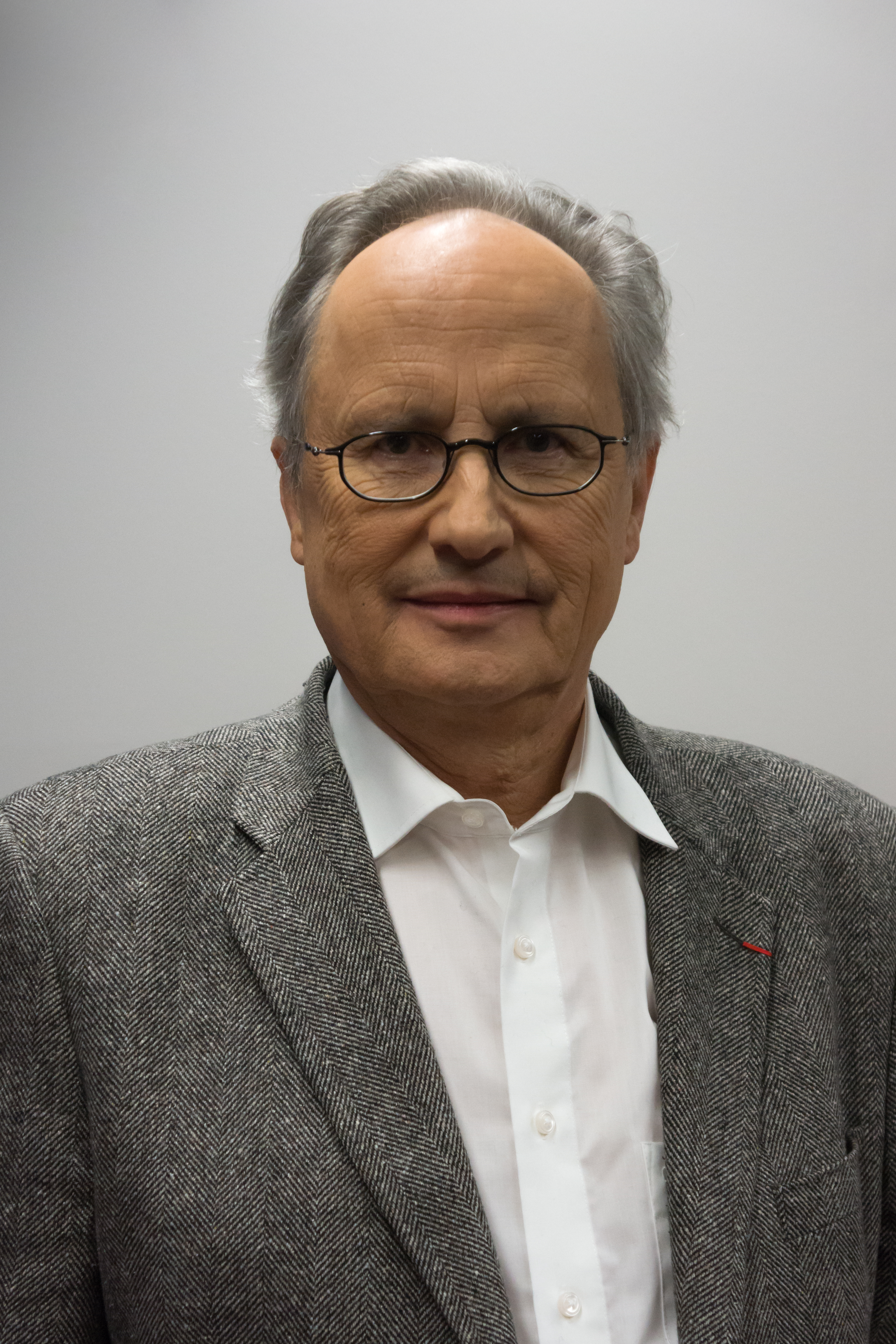
- Portrait of Jacques Pilet
- Born: October 18, 1943 (age 82) La Tour-de-Peilz, Vaud, Switzerland
- Occupation: Journalist and creator of Swiss newspapers
- Language: French

Jacques Pilet was born on October 18, 1943, in La Tour-de-Peilz, canton of Vaud, Switzerland is a journalist and creator of Swiss newspapers.

== Biography ==
He was educated in Montreux and in Saint-Maurice. Stays in Göttingen. From 1964 to 1967 he began in journalism at the Journal de Montreux. 1967-1974: editor at "24 heures" (TV columnist, then surveys and reports department). 1974-1981: Journalist at Télévision Suisse Romande, mainly for the program Temps present, then producer of the Swiss news magazine Tell What.

In 1981 he founded L'Hebdo for the Zurich publisher Ringier and became editor-in-chief. At the same time (1985-1986) created the European cultural magazine “Emois”. 1991: Founder and editor-in-chief ofLe Nouveau Quotidien. The shareholders are the press groups Edipresse (80%) and Ringier (20%). 1997: Head of the Ringier development group and responsible for designing new publications, such as Dimanche.ch which was created in 1999.

2000: Member of the Ringier Management, heads the newspaper department until 2002. 2002–present: editorial consultant attached to the management of the Ringier group. Several advisory missions in Hungary, Romania and Serbia. Head of the group's Editorial Committee, chaired by Mr. Michael Ringier. Member of the "Beirat" (editorial board) of the German magazine "Cicero" in Berlin. Maintains a weekly column at L'Hebdo. A connoisseur of Latin America, he travels there frequently and publishes numerous reports on Colombia, Brazil, Peru in particular.

He is in favor of Switzerland joining the European Union. He made a strong commitment to yes to the European Economic Area in 1992. In 1991, he designed and produced (with CAB Productions in Lausanne) a show (The epic of Europe), presented in the tent of Mario Botta in Sils Maria as part of the European day of the 700th anniversary of the Confederation. In 2002, he organized the European National Exhibition Day. He created and chaired the Swiss section of the European Cultural Foundation, founded in Netherlands.

Following the disappearance of LHebdo in 2017, Jacques Pilet participated in the creation of the new online French-speaking newspaper Bon pour la tête whose 1st issue came out on June 21, 2017.

== Personal life ==
He married the photographer Simone Oppliger, who died in 2006. Their son François is a journalist.

== Works ==
- The Nazi Crime of Payerne, ed. Favre (from the film made for "Temps Present" with Yvan Dalain).
- collective work, L'Europe au cœur, ed. Favr
