= Newspaper of record =

Major newspapers that are considered authoritative

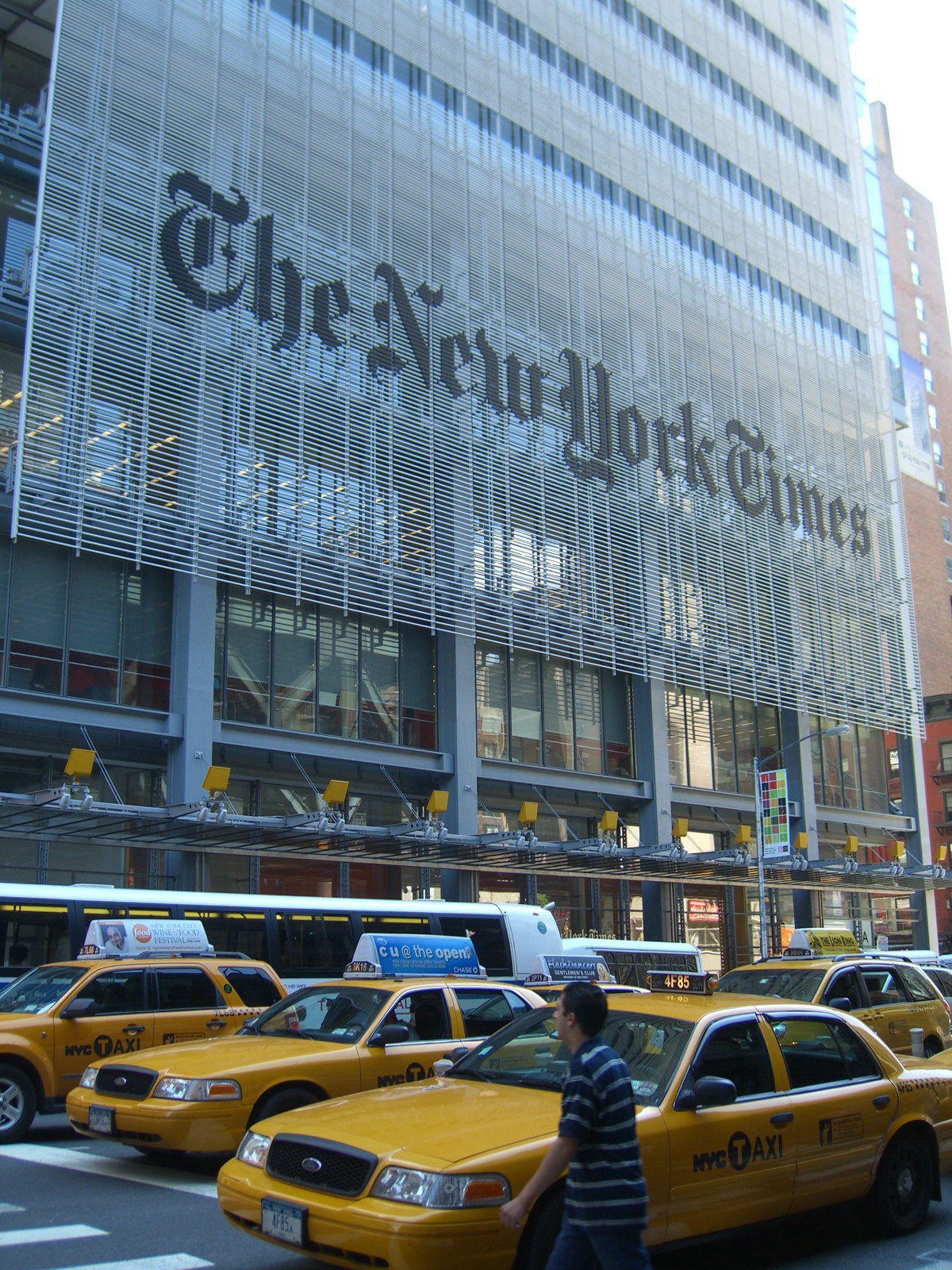
The New York Times Building in Midtown Manhattan. Some meanings of the term originated in reference to The New York Times.

A newspaper of record is a major national newspaper with large circulation whose editorial and news-gathering functions are considered authoritative and independent. Such publications are thus "newspapers of record by reputation" and include some of the oldest and most widely respected newspapers in the world. The number and trend of "newspapers of record by reputation" is related to the state of press freedom and political freedom in a country.

It may also be a newspaper authorized to publish public or legal notices, thus serving as a newspaper of public record. A newspaper whose editorial content is directed by the state can be referred to as an official newspaper of record, but the lack of editorial independence means that it is not a "newspaper of record by reputation". Newspapers of record by reputation that focus on business can also be called newspapers of financial record.

== Newspapers of public record ==
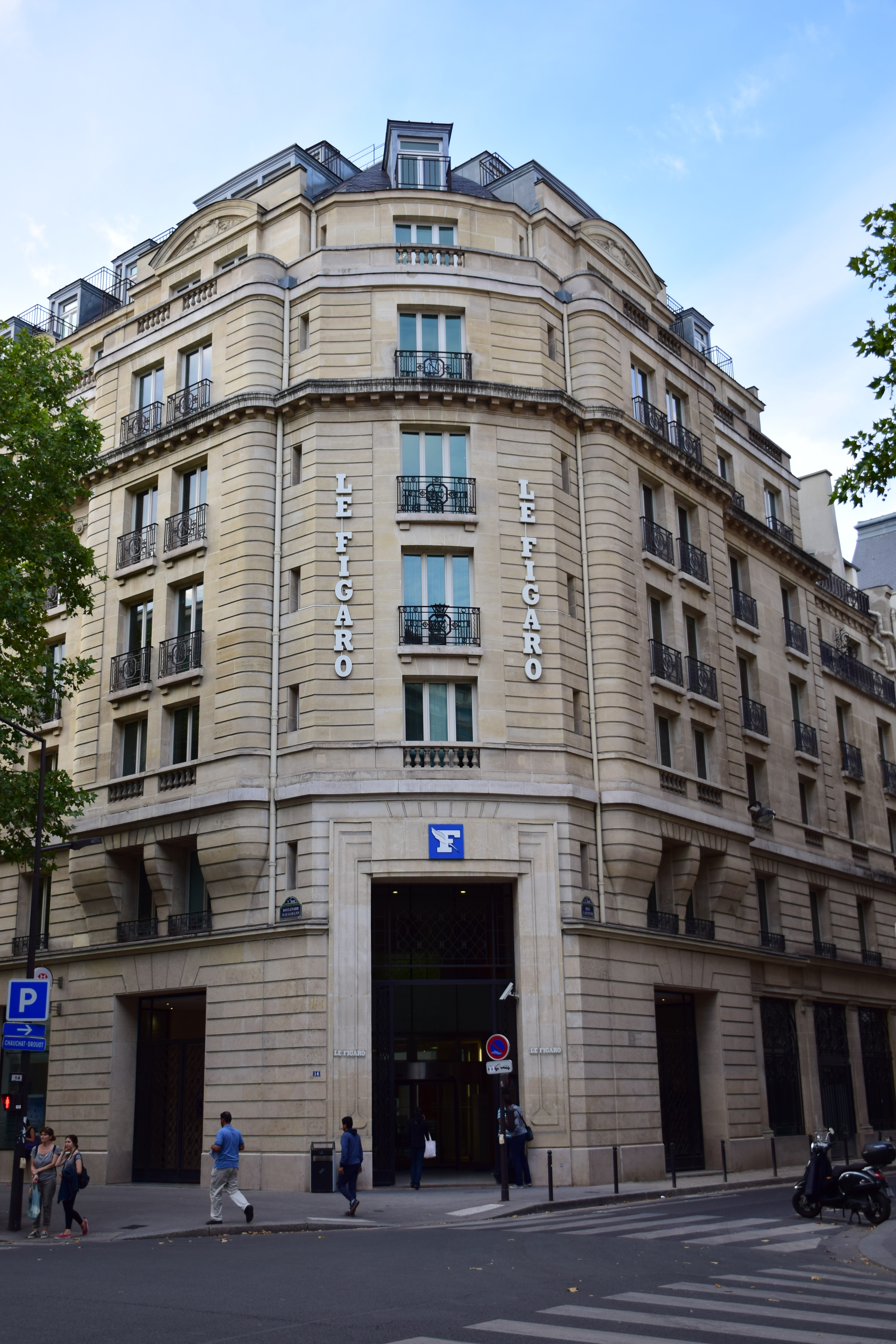
Paris headquarters of Le Figaro, France's centre-right newspaper of record (public record and by reputation)

A "newspaper of public record", or government gazette, refers to a publicly available newspaper that is authorized by a government to publish public or legal notices. It is often established by statute or official action and publication of notices within it, whether by the government or a private party, is considered sufficient to comply with legal requirements for public notice. Such gazettes may have minimal or no editorial content (opinion articles), and are focused on public notification of state services and state decisions; an example is Latvia's Latvijas Vēstnesis.

In some jurisdictions, privately owned newspapers may register with the government to publish public and legal notices, or be otherwise eligible to publish such notices (terms used may include "newspaper of general circulation" among others). Likewise, a private newspaper may be designated by the courts for publication of legal notices, such as notices of fictitious business names, if judicial and statutory standards are met. These are sometimes called "legally adjudicated newspapers".

=== Government organs ===
The term "newspapers of public record" can also denote those owned and operated by a government that directs their entire editorial content. Such newspapers, while pejoratively termed "state mouthpieces", can also be called "official newspapers of record", independently of whether they publish legal notices – distinguishing them from a gazette whose primary role is to publish notices, as their entire content represents the official view and doctrine of the state. This kind of official newspaper is distinct from newspapers of record by reputation, and is liable to fail the reputation criterion due to its governmental control. The word "official" can be used to distinguish them from "newspapers of record by reputation". Examples include Russia's Rossiyskaya Gazeta, North Korea's Rodong Sinmun, and China's People's Daily.

== Newspapers of record by reputation ==
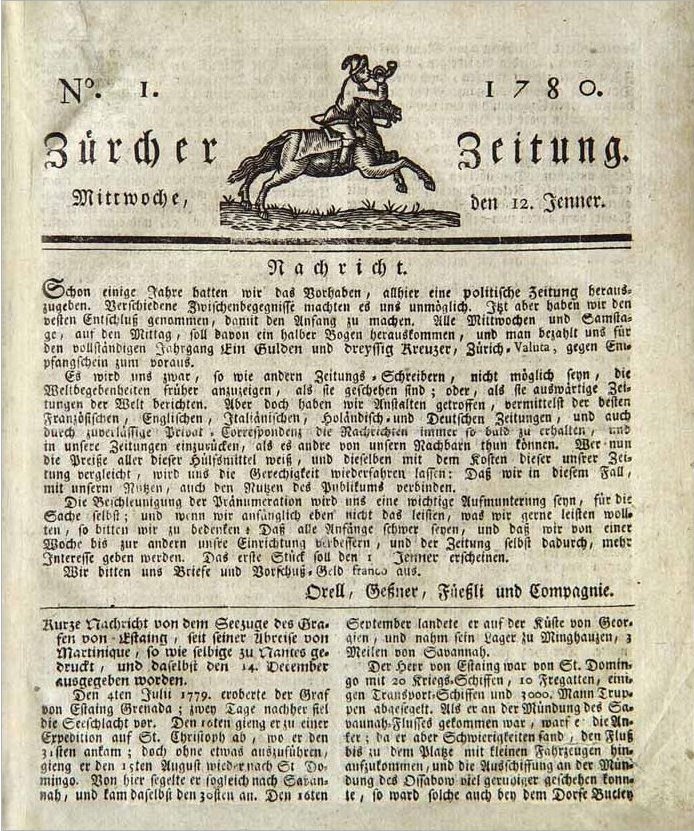
First edition of Neue Zürcher Zeitung (1780), the world's oldest newspaper of record by reputation

The second type of "newspaper of record" (also "journal of record", or in French presse de référence) is not defined by formal criteria, and its characteristics vary. The category comprises newspapers that are considered to meet high standards of journalism, including editorial independence (particularly from the government and from its owners), accountability (mistakes are acknowledged), attention to detail and accuracy, and comprehensiveness and balance of coverage; they are regarded internationally (as well as in their own country/region) by major global outlets.

Despite changes in society, newspapers of record by reputation have historically tended to maintain a similar tone, coverage, style, and traditions; many are over a century old and some over two centuries old (e.g., Neue Zürcher Zeitung, The Times, The Guardian, Le Figaro, and The Sydney Morning Herald). Newspapers of record by reputation can be respected for the accuracy and quality of their reporting and still be either ideologically conservative (e.g., The Wall Street Journal and The Telegraph) or ideologically liberal (e.g., The Guardian).

Although many countries are proud of their newspapers of record by reputation, in some countries they face an openly hostile state or political system that tries to suppress their press freedoms. Examples include Turkey's Cumhuriyet, where many of the staff have been imprisoned; Panama's La Prensa, where staff have been shot and the owners forced into exile; and Venezuela's El Nacional, which was forced out of print when the state seized its assets (see examples of fallen newspapers of record).

=== Etymology ===
The term is believed to have originated among librarians who began referring to The New York Times as the "newspaper of record" when it became the first U.S. newspaper in 1913 to publish an index of the subjects it covered. In recognition of that usage, The New York Times held an essay contest in 1927 in which entrants had to demonstrate "The Value of The New York Times Index and Files as a Newspaper of Record". The New York Times, and other newspapers of its type sought to chronicle events, acting as a record of the day's announcements, schedules, directories, proceedings, transcripts, and appointments. By 2004, The New York Times no longer considered itself a newspaper of record in the original, literal sense.

Over time, historians relied on The New York Times and similar titles as a reliable archival and historical record of significant past events, and a gauge of societal opinions at the time of printing. The term "newspaper of record" evolved from its original literal sense to that newer meaning.

The derived term "financial (or business) newspaper of record" is attributed to The Wall Street Journal, the Financial Times, and to the Nihon Keizai Shimbun (Nikkei). While newspapers of record by reputation are typically major widely-read national (and international) publications, subject-specific newspapers of record also exist.

=== Examples of existing newspapers ===
Country	Region	Logo	Name	City of publication	Founded	Language	Refs.
Argentina	South America	La Nación	La Nación	Buenos Aires	1870	Spanish	
Australia	Oceania	The Age logo	The Age	Melbourne	1854	English	
Australia	Oceania	The Sydney Morning Herald logo	The Sydney Morning Herald	Sydney	1831	English	
Austria	Central Europe	Die Presse logo	Die Presse	Vienna	1848 (Note: Staff split in 1864 to form Neue Freie Presse, aryanized by the Nazis in 1938 and closed in 1939, reestablished as Die Presse in 1946.)	German	
Austria	Central Europe	Der Standard logo	Der Standard	Vienna	1988	German	
Azerbaijan	Central Asia	Azadlıq	Azadlıq	Baku	1989	Azeri	
(The Bahamas) Bahamas	Caribbean	The Nassau Guardian	The Nassau Guardian	Nassau	1844	English	
Bahrain	Arabia	Akhbar Al Khaleej logo	Akhbar Al Khaleej	Manama	1976	Arabic	
Bahrain	Arabia	The Gulf Daily News logo	Gulf Daily News	Manama	1978	English	
Bangladesh	South Asia		The Daily Star	Dhaka	1991	English	
Belgium	Western Europe	Le Soir	Le Soir	Brussels	1887	French	
Belgium	Western Europe	De Standaard	De Standaard	Brussels	1918	Dutch	
Bermuda	North America	The Royal Gazette logo	The Royal Gazette	Hamilton	1828	English	
Bolivia	South America	El Diario	El Diario	La Paz	1904	Spanish	
Brazil	South America	O Estado de S. Paulo Logo	O Estado de S. Paulo	São Paulo	1875	Portuguese	
Brazil	South America	Folha de S.Paulo	Folha de S.Paulo	São Paulo	1921	Portuguese	
Brazil	South America	O Globo	O Globo	Rio de Janeiro	1925	Portuguese	
Canada	North America	Le Devoir	Le Devoir	Montreal	1910	French	
Canada	North America	La Presse	La Presse	Montreal	1884	French	
Canada	North America	The Globe and Mail	The Globe and Mail	Toronto	1844 (Note: Successor to The Globe (founded 1844), The Toronto Mail (1872) and Toronto Empire (1887); papers merged in 1895 and 1936.)	English	
Chile	South America	El Mercurio	El Mercurio	Santiago	1900 (Note: Spun off from El Mercurio de Valparaíso (founded 1827).)	Spanish	
Colombia	South America	El Tiempo	El Tiempo	Bogotá	1911	Spanish	
Colombia	South America	El Espectador	El Espectador	Bogotá	1887	Spanish	
Costa Rica	Central America	La Nación logo	La Nación	San José	1946	Spanish	
Cuba	Caribbean	Granma logo	Granma	Havana	1965	Spanish (Note: International editions published in English, French, Portuguese, Italian, and German)	
Czech Republic	Central Europe	Lidové noviny	Lidové noviny	Prague	1893	Czech	
Denmark	Northern Europe	Berlingske	Berlingske	Copenhagen	1749 (Note: Named Berlingske Tidende until 2011.)	Danish	
Dominican Republic	Caribbean	Listín Diario logo	Listín Diario	Santo Domingo	1889	Spanish	
Ecuador	South America	El Comercio logo	El Comercio	Quito	1921	Spanish	
Egypt	North Africa		Al-Ahram	Cairo	1875	Arabic	
Egypt	North Africa	Al-Masry Al-Youm	Al-Masry Al-Youm	Cairo	2004	Arabic	
Fiji	Oceania	The Fiji Times logo	The Fiji Times	Suva	1869	English	
Fiji	Oceania		Shanti Dut	Suva	1935	Hindi	
Finland	Northern Europe	Helsingin Sanomat	Helsingin Sanomat	Helsinki	1889	Finnish	
France	Western Europe	Le Figaro	Le Figaro	Paris	1826 (Note: Le Figaro is France's oldest national newspaper still operating to this date.)	French	
France	Western Europe	Libération	Libération	Paris	1973	French	
France	Western Europe	Le Monde	Le Monde	Paris	1944 (Note: Founded as a successor to the discredited collaborationist Le Temps (founded 1861).)	French	
Gabon	Central Africa	L'Union logo	L'Union	Libreville	1973	French	
Germany	Western Europe	Frankfurter Allgemeine Zeitung	Frankfurter Allgemeine Zeitung	Frankfurt	1949 (Note: Considered a successor to the Frankfurter Zeitung (founded 1856), banned in 1943 by the Nazis.)	German	
Germany	Western Europe	Süddeutsche Zeitung	Süddeutsche Zeitung	Munich	1945	German	
Germany	Western Europe	Die Welt	Die Welt	Berlin	1946	German	
Germany	Western Europe	Die Zeit	Die Zeit	Hamburg	1946	German	
Greece	Southern Europe	Kathimerini	Kathimerini	Athens	1919	Greek	
Guatemala	North America	Prensa Libre	Prensa Libre	Guatemala City	1951	Spanish	
Haiti	Caribbean	Le Nouvelliste logo	Le Nouvelliste	Port-au-Prince	1898	French	
Hong Kong	East Asia	The South China Morning Post	South China Morning Post	Hong Kong	1903	English	
Iceland	Northern Europe		Morgunblaðið	Reykjavík	1913	Icelandic	
India	South Asia	The Times of India	The Times of India	Mumbai	1838	English	
India	South Asia	The Hindu	The Hindu	Chennai	1878	English	
Indonesia	Southeast Asia	Kompas	Kompas	Jakarta	1965	Indonesian	
Iran	West Asia	Ettela'at	Ettela'at	Tehran	1926	Persian	
(Republic of Ireland) Ireland	Northern Europe	The Irish Times	The Irish Times	Dublin	1859	English	
Israel	West Asia	Haaretz	Haaretz	Tel Aviv	1919	Hebrew	
Israel	West Asia	Haaretz	Haaretz	Tel Aviv	1919	English	
Italy	Southern Europe	Corriere della Sera	Corriere della Sera	Milan	1876	Italian	
Italy	Southern Europe	La Repubblica	la Repubblica	Rome	1976	Italian	
Italy	Southern Europe	Il Sole 24 Ore	Il Sole 24 Ore	Milan	1965	Italian	
Italy	Southern Europe	La Stampa	La Stampa	Turin	1867	Italian	
Italy	Southern Europe	Il Messaggero	Il Messaggero	Rome	1878	Italian	
Jamaica	Caribbean	The Gleaner	The Gleaner	Kingston	1834	English	
Japan	East Asia	The Asahi Shimbun	The Asahi Shimbun	Osaka	1879	Japanese and English	
Japan	East Asia	Nihon Keizai Shimbun (Nikkei)	Nihon Keizai Shimbun (Nikkei)	Tokyo	1876	Japanese and English	
Japan	East Asia	Yomiuri Shimbun	Yomiuri Shimbun	Tokyo	1874	Japanese and English	
Japan	East Asia	Mainichi Shimbun	Mainichi Shimbun	Tokyo	1872	Japanese and English	
Jordan	West Asia		Al Ra'i	Amman	1971	Arabic	
Kenya	East Africa	Daily Nation	Daily Nation	Nairobi	1960 (Note: Originated as the Swahili Taifa in 1958.)	English	
Kosovo	Eastern Europe	Koha Ditore logo	Koha Ditore	Pristina	1997	Albanian	
Latvia	Northern Europe		Diena	Riga	1990	Latvian	
Lebanon	West Asia	An-Nahar	An-Nahar	Beirut	1933	Arabic	
Malaysia	Southeast Asia	New Straits Times	New Straits Times (Note: The Straits Times and New Straits Times were qualified as "semi-official newspapers of record" in the Encyclopedia of Journalism (2009) as "each is tightly connected to the dominant political party of their respective countries".)	Kuala Lumpur	1965 (Note: Spun off from The Straits Times (founded 1845) upon Singapore's independence.)	English	
Mexico	North America	Excélsior	Excélsior	Mexico City	1917	Spanish	
Mexico	North America		Reforma	Mexico City	1993	Spanish	
Netherlands	Western Europe	NRC	NRC	Amsterdam	1970 (Note: Merger of Algemeen Handelsblad (founded 1828) and Nieuwe Rotterdamsche Courant (1844).)	Dutch	
New Zealand	Oceania	New Zealand Herald	The New Zealand Herald	Auckland	1863	English	
Nigeria	West Africa		The Guardian	Lagos	1983	English	
North Korea	East Asia	Rodong Sinmun	Rodong Sinmun	Pyongyang	1945	Korean (Note: An online-only international edition is published in English)	
Norway	Northern Europe	Aftenposten	Aftenposten	Oslo	1860	Norwegian (Riksmål)	
Pakistan	South Asia	Dawn	Dawn	Karachi	1941	English	
Pakistan	South Asia		Jang	Karachi	1939	Urdu	
Panama	North America	La Prensa	La Prensa	Panama City	1980	Spanish	
Paraguay	South America	ABC Color	ABC Color	Asunción	1967	Spanish	
Peru	South America	El Comercio	El Comercio	Lima	1839	Spanish	
Philippines	Southeast Asia	Philippine Daily Inquirer	Philippine Daily Inquirer	Makati	1985	English	
Poland	Central Europe	Gazeta Wyborcza	Gazeta Wyborcza	Warsaw	1989	Polish	
Poland	Central Europe	Rzeczpospolita	Rzeczpospolita	Warsaw	1920 (Note: Dissolved in 1931 and revived in 1944, second dissolution in 1951, revived again in 1982.)	Polish	
Portugal	Southern Europe		Diário de Notícias	Lisbon	1864	Portuguese	
Portugal	Southern Europe	Publico	Público	Lisbon	1990	Portuguese	
Puerto Rico	Caribbean	El Nuevo Día	El Nuevo Día	Guaynabo	1909	Spanish	
Republic of the Congo	Central Africa		La Semaine Africaine	Brazzaville	1952	French	
Romania	Southern Europe		Adevărul	Bucharest	1871	Romanian	
Serbia	Southern Europe	Danas	Danas	Belgrade	1997	Serbian	
Singapore	Southeast Asia	The Straits Times	The Straits Times	Singapore	1845	English	
South Africa	South Africa		Mail & Guardian	Johannesburg	1985	English	
South Korea	East Asia	The Chosun Ilbo	The Chosun Ilbo	Seoul	1920	Korean	
South Korea	East Asia	The Dong-A Ilbo	The Dong-A Ilbo	Seoul	1920	Korean	
South Korea	East Asia	JoongAng Ilbo	JoongAng Ilbo	Seoul	1965	Korean	
Spain	Southern Europe	La Vanguardia	La Vanguardia	Barcelona	1881	Spanish	
Spain	Southern Europe	ABC	ABC	Madrid	1903	Spanish	
Spain	Southern Europe	El Mundo	El Mundo	Madrid	1989	Spanish	
Spain	Southern Europe	El País	El País	Madrid	1976	Spanish	
Sweden	Northern Europe	Dagens Nyheter	Dagens Nyheter	Stockholm	1864	Swedish	
Switzerland	Western Europe	Neue Zürcher Zeitung	Neue Zürcher Zeitung	Zurich	1780	German	
Switzerland	Western Europe	Le Temps	Le Temps	Geneva	1998 (Note: Merger of Journal de Genève (founded 1826), Gazette de Lausanne (1798), and Le Nouveau Quotidien (1991).)	French	
Thailand	Southeast Asia	Bangkok Post	Bangkok Post	Bangkok	1946	English	
Thailand	Southeast Asia	Matichon	Matichon	Bangkok	1978	Thai	
Trinidad and Tobago	Caribbean	Trinidad and Tobago Guardian	Trinidad and Tobago Guardian	Port of Spain	1917	English	
Turkey	West Asia	Cumhuriyet	Cumhuriyet	Istanbul	1924	Turkish	
United Kingdom	Northern Europe	The Daily Telegraph	The Daily Telegraph	London	1855	English	
United Kingdom	Northern Europe	The Financial Times	Financial Times	London	1888	English	
United Kingdom	Northern Europe	The London Gazette	The London Gazette	London	1665 (Note: First published on 1665-11-07 as The Oxford Gazette.)	English	
United Kingdom	Northern Europe	The Guardian	The Guardian	London	1821 (Note: Founded as The Manchester Guardian, adopted its present name in 1959.)	English	
United Kingdom	Northern Europe	The Times	The Times	London	1785 (Note: Named The Daily Universal Register until 1788.)	English	
United States	North America	Los Angeles Times	Los Angeles Times	Los Angeles	1881	English	
United States	North America	The New York Times	The New York Times	New York City	1851	English	
United States	North America	The Wall Street Journal	The Wall Street Journal	New York City	1889	English	
United States	North America	The washington Post	The Washington Post	Washington, D.C.	1877	English	
Vatican City	Southern Europe	L'Osservatore Romano	L'Osservatore Romano	Vatican City	1861	Italian (Note: Also published weekly in English, French, Spanish, German, Polish, and Portuguese)	

=== Examples of fallen newspapers ===
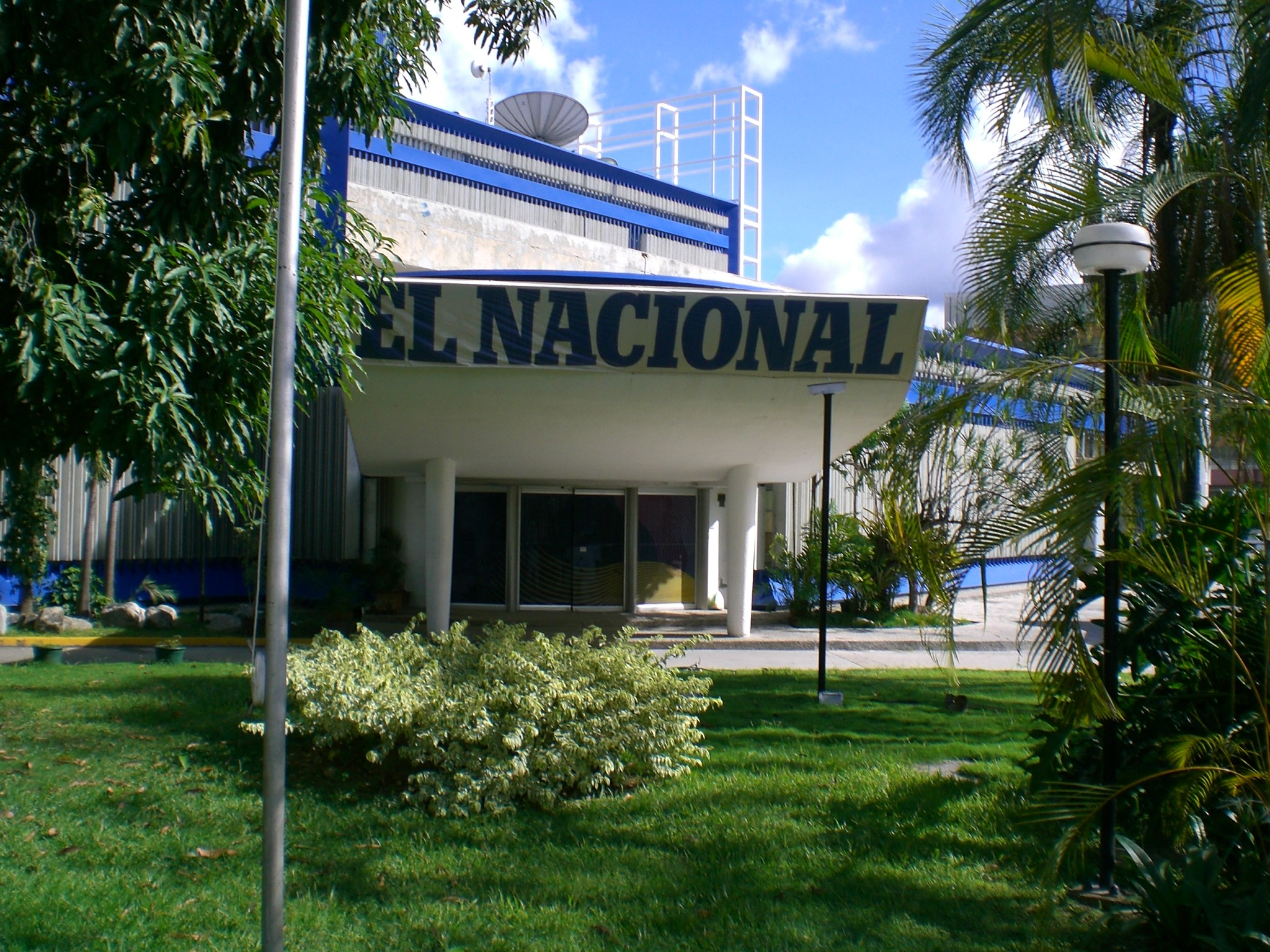
The former headquarters of El Nacional, Venezuela's long-standing newspaper of record, which was seized by the state in 2018 and forced out of newsprint production

Over time, some established newspapers of record by reputation have lost their status due to financial collapse, take-over or merger by another entity that did not have the same standards or allowed increased government control and suppression of the paper's editorial independence. The existence of newspapers of record by reputation is an aspect of the level of press freedom and political freedom in a country, with major first-world democracies having several such newspapers (e.g. United States, United Kingdom, Germany, France, Canada, Italy and Japan); in contrast, countries that have seen a decline in their newspapers of record by reputation can represent a decline in levels of personal and political freedom (e.g. Zimbabwe, Venezuela, and Cambodia).

Examples include:

- Zimbabwe's The Herald lost its status as an established newspaper of record when it was eventually taken over by Robert Mugabe's Zanu-PF party.
- Venezuela's newspaper of record, El Nacional, was forced out of print by the state in 2018, and its headquarters was given to a high-ranking official.
- London-based pan-Arab newspaper of record, Al-Hayat, ceased publication in 2020 due to financial and political pressures.
- In Cambodia, the Hun Sen administration forced both of Cambodia's newspapers of record out of business using contrived tax fines that resulted in the closure of The Cambodia Daily in 2017, and the sale of The Phnom Penh Post to a close ally of the Hun Sen administration in 2018.
- Latvian newspaper Diena saw its established status as a newspaper of record diminish after a 2010 takeover, with the Historical Dictionary of Latvia (2017) listing it as "holding tenuously to a popular newspaper-of-record sentiment at home and abroad" due to "questions of ownership and if said owners influence newspaper content".
- Népszabadság, Hungary's de facto newspaper of record, ceased publication in 2016 due to political and financial pressure.
- Hürriyet, Turkey's former newspaper of record, lost its status as the newspaper of record in 2018, when it was sold to Demirören Group, a close ally of the Erdoğan administration, after years of financial pressure.

== See also ==
- Freedom of the press
- Grupo de Diarios América
- List of national newspapers
- List of government gazettes
- Weekly newspaper
