= Marc Lamunière =

Swiss writer (1921–2021)

- Born: 12 February 1921; Lausanne, Switzerland
- Died: 6 July 2021 (aged 100)
- Occupations: Writer and Publisher

Marc Lamunière (12 February 1921 – 6 July 2021) was a Swiss writer and publisher.

== Biography ==
Lamunière earned a law degree before becoming CEO of the Société de la Feuille d'Avis de Lausanne and Imprimeries Réunies SA. He was then CEO of Edipresse, and subsequently President from 1986 to 1998. A lover of painting, lithography, and jazz, he wrote using several pseudonyms, such as Marc Lacaze, under which he contributed to Le Nouveau Quotidien. His 1996 novel, Le dessert indien, earned him the Prix de la Nouvelle de langue française. For his 2000 thriller, La peau de Sharon, he wrote under the pseudonym Ken Wood. His final book, Le Jardin des piqûres, was published in 2021.

Marc Lamunière died on 6 July 2021 at the age of 100.
