= Journal de Genève =

Swiss newspaper

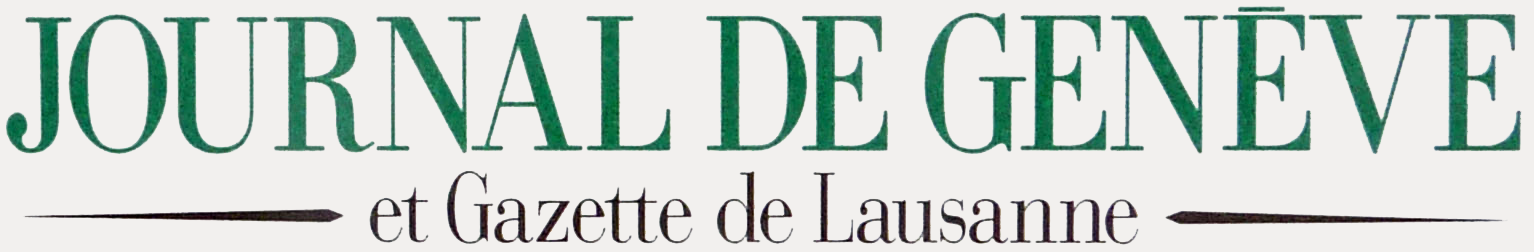

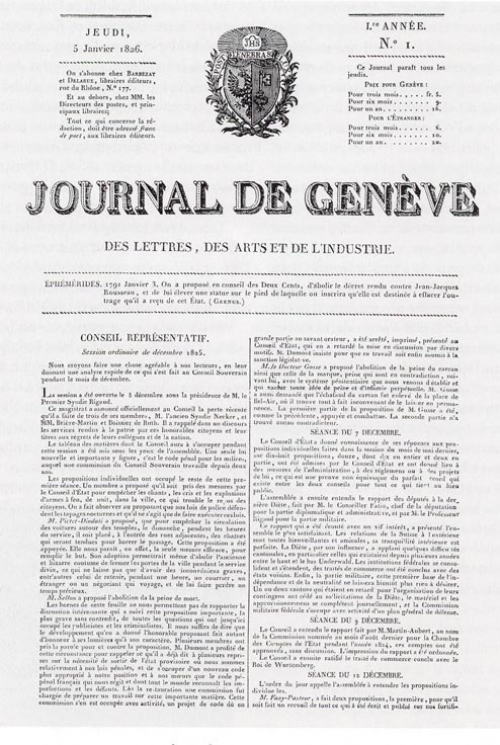
- Front page of the Journal de Genève on 5 January 1826
- Type: Daily newspaper
- Publisher: Edipresse
- Founded: 1826
- Ceased publication: February 1998
- Language: French
- Headquarters: Geneva
- Country: Switzerland
- Circulation: 32,000 (as of February 1998)
- ISSN: 1010-2108
- OCLC number: 405747055

The Journal de Genève (JdG) was a Swiss French-language daily newspaper founded in 1826. In 1991, the Gazette de Lausanne was merged into it, after which it was titled the Journal de Genève et Gazette de Lausanne. Following financial difficulties that faced both papers, it was merged in March 1998 with the Le Nouveau Quotidien to form Le Temps.

== History ==
A different paper, a scientific weekly also called the Journal de Genève, was founded in 1787, published by Jacques Paul, an engineer, until 1792. It ceased publication two years later.

In 1826, James Fazy, Salomon Cougnard, Jean-François Chaponnière, John Petit-Senn and Antoine Gaudy-Lefort, five prominent Swiss liberals, founded the Journal. The paper was initially operated as a weekly paper, designed to criticize a government they perceived as reactionary. In 1832, it was switched to twice weekly publications. The earliest numbers (dated to 1840) gave a count of 1200 in circulation, and in 1850 it became a daily paper. During the Franco-Prussian War the paper became increasingly popular, as it did during WWI. It eventually became one of the most influential papers in Francophone Switzerland. A supplement to the paper was created in the 1960s, the Samedi littéraire.

== Merger ==
Due to the financial issues of the Gazette de Lausanne paper, they began to collaborate in the early 1970s. The Gazette was eventually merged into the Journal completely in 1991 (with the Journal's full title being changed to the Journal de Genève et Gazette de Lausanne). This was also spurred on by the announcement of another daily paper (which later became the Le Nouveau Quotidien), as the proposed paper was deemed to target a similar audience and they wished to gain more readers.

It was proposed that the JdG and the NQ merge in 1996. The editorial staff of both papers met, but this was declined by its publisher Edipresse as it would have resulted in layoffs. Later that year, the papers again proposed a merger, as they were both facing financial troubles, and it was agreed they would the next year. The editor-in-chief of the news magazine L'Hebdo, Eric Hoesli, would become the director and editor-in-chief of their new combined paper, provisionally named the Nouveau Journal, to be headquartered in Geneva. The editors-in-chief of the two merged papers, Ignace Jeannerat and Alain Campiotti, were to assist him. The merger strengthened Edipresse's position in the French-speaking news market. The JdG's company and Edipresse would each own 47% of the new title, with the future editorial team having 6%. Hoesli expressed that the new paper should not be a patchwork of the old two, but an entirely new publication.

The Swiss federation of journalists said they "deeply regretted" the loss of the two papers. The NQ editorial company expressed their concerns about employment; The editors of the JdG went on a "signature strike" over potential job losses as a response to this, which lasted for six weeks; the editors signed their articles collectively as a sign of solidarity. They complained that their efforts to combat the merger were ignored, and that there had been new editorial projects being prepared; they also said the JdG had been moving towards a more balanced economic position and that it should be maintained. Its editorial society denounced a trend of "transforming newspapers into products", and that by merging their 170-year history paper had been integrated "into the Edipresse machine".

The Competition Commission accepted the merger in December 1997, as despite the fact that it gave Edipresse an advantage the JdG was unlikely to survive given the market conditions, so it was the least harmful option; the two conditions imposed by the CC were that any change in the capital structure of the new publication had to be authorized by them, and that the chairman of the board of the directors would be independent of the shareholders. 32 jobs were to be lost as a result of this merger. In February 1998 the NQ and the JdG were discontinued (with the JdG having a circulation of 32,000 copies at the end of its publication), to be combined to form Le Temps the next month. The new paper was expected to have 90 journalist positions and a circulation of 50,000.

The paper's digitized archives are available on the Le Temps Archives website.
