= Sibylle Blanc =

Swiss actress

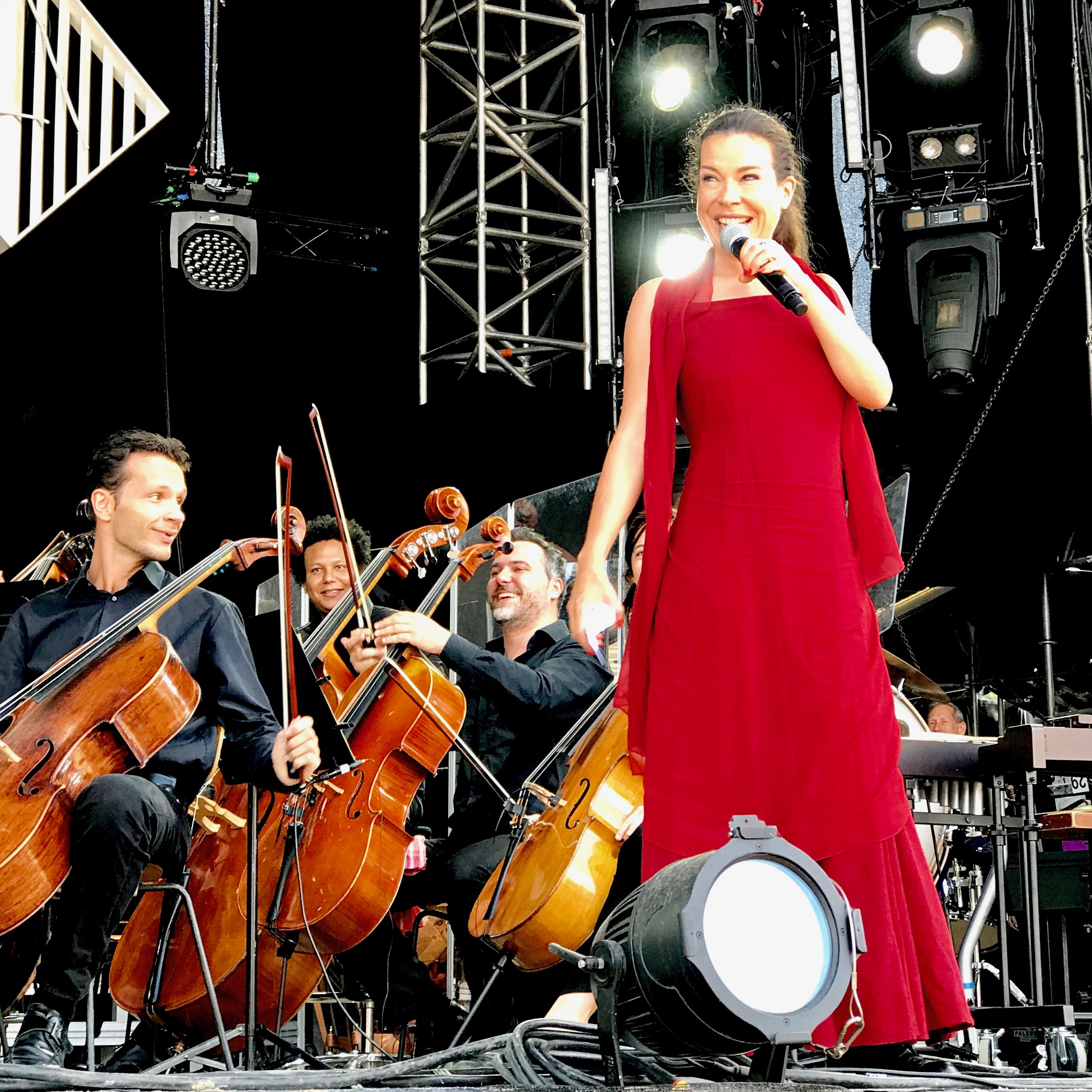
- Sibylle Blanc presenting at Paléo 2017
- Born: Sibylle Blanc; January 3, 1974 (age 52); Aubonne, Switzerland
- Height: 1.58 m (5 ft 2 in)
- Website: Comedien.ch

Sibylle Blanc (born January 3, 1974 in Aubonne, Vaud) is a French-speaking Swiss actress, writer and director who is actively involved in theatrical, film, television and radio productions in her native Switzerland as well as in nearby France.

Her first name is easily misspelt and she is sometimes wrongly credited as Sybille Blanc.

== Personal life ==
Blanc is the daughter of Pierre-Alain Blanc who is a former mayor of Aubonne and a teacher of physical education. Sport is important to her father who organised a triathlon in Aubonne every year. As part of her fitness routine she regularly plays badminton with her father.

She lived in a charming sixth floor apartment in a building without an elevator. "C'est pratique, j'ai trouvé un appartement avec fitness intégré! (It's practical, I've found an apartment with fitness built in!)" she said jokingly in an interview with Wladimir Bianchi She first came across her apartment when she went there to read for her first professional theatrical role as Cordélia in King Lear. She fell in love with it immediately. Several years later she saw in a newspaper, next to an article about herself, an advertisement that the apartment was available.

As well as fitness Blanc also takes her diet very seriously and eats primarily fruit and steamed vegetables and tries to drink two litres of tea every day.

== Career ==
Blanc studied dramatic arts at the Ecole Supérieure d'Art Dramatique (ESAD) in Geneva graduating in 1996. Early in her professional career she appeared on several children's TV programs produced by the TSR including Smash and Bus et compagnie. Her first major role came with the TSR produced sitcom (in French)Bigoudi where she played Laura for 50 episodes from 1996 to 1998. Since that time she has frequently appeared on television programs produced by the French-language Swiss national TV station, TSR.

She has a tremendous ability to play a diverse range of roles which was brought out in her portrayal of the various female characters in Matt Cameron's play Ruby Moon and in the numerous comedy cabaret shows (La Revue 2000, Les nouvelles brèves de comptoir and La Revue de Cuche et Barbezat) which she has performed in. In the latter and in the musical Irma la Douce she was able to display her strong talent for singing and dancing. She has played numerous classical characters in plays by such authors as Shakespeare, Wilde, Miller, Beckett, Labiche and Pagnol as well as more modern roles in plays by authors such as Ruccello, Cameron and Dear. Blanc is fluent in both English and French and has even played an American in Hazanov's film Salade(s) Russe(s).

She was co-author and the lead singer / poet in an innovative local Geneva based contemporary art collective / band, Bootymachine, between 2008 and 2009. An AI generative model for her voice on this award-winning project has been trained and available to download and use by IRCAM.

On top of acting and singing she has also co-hosted the morning radio shows Le 6-9 on Radio NRJ in 2001 and Les Matinales on Lausanne FM from 2006 to 2007. Since its formation in 2008 she has been the voice of Lausanne based radio station LFM(in French) and she has appeared numerous times on the Radio Télévision Suisse comedy show Les Dicodeurs.

She has hosted many events. Notable amongst these are GRAND (Grand Prix Romand de la Création - an award ceremony for outstanding work in the field of communications in the French part of Switzerland) in 2011 and 2013 and the second largest stage (originally called Le Chapiteau and presently called Les Arches) at the Paleo Festival between 2000 and 2017.

Since turning 40 she has earned her bachelor's degree in Linguistics and Psychology and her master's degree in Speech Therapy at the University of Geneva. She also announced at a showing of the film "Sam" in 2015 that she was working on a script for a future film.

The following information has been compiled from Blanc's agent's website, the Swiss French actor's website Comedien.ch, the Internet Movie Database. and from the Swiss Films website.

=== Theatre ===
2025

- Une Création Originale written by Gloria Belzenore (a.k.a. Sibylle Blanc), Théâtre les Salons, Geneva (Gloria Belzenore)

2021

- Cassandre written by Jean Potocki, Le théâtre de l'Epiderme, Parc de la Mairie de Vandoeuvres, Geneva (Cassandre)

2020

- L'Invisible Chemin written by Sarah Marcuse, Samadhi Project, Théâtre Pitoëff, Geneva (Meredith Prank)

2019

- L'Invisible Chemin written by Sarah Marcuse, Théâtre du Mont-Dore, Nouméa, New Caledonia (Meredith Prank)

2018

- I Tube You written by Gaspard Boesch, Théâtre Cité Bleue, Geneva and Théâtre Montreux Riviera, Montreux (Wiki)

2016

- Complètement a l'Est: La Riviera s'Électro-Balkanise written by Blaise Hofmann and Jean-Luc Barbezat, Théâtre du Pré-aux-Moines, Cossonay (Narrator)
- La soirée diapos written by Frédéric Recrosio and Jean-Luc Barbezat, touring Switzerland (Herself)

2014

- Le songe de Clara written by Daniel Eisler, Salle des Remparts, La Tour-de-Peilz, Salle communale, Ste-Croix and the Aula du Collège du Belvédère, Lausanne (Clara)

2013

- Les liaisons dangereuses written by Christopher Hampton, Théâtre Alchimic, Carouge, directed by Elidan Arzoni (Mme de Merteuil)
- La poudre aux yeux written by Eugène Labiche, Théâtre de Carouge, Carouge, directed by David Bauhofer (Madame Malingear)
- I Tube You written by Gaspard Boesch, Casino-théâtre, Geneva (Wiki)

2011

- La Riviera fait son Cirque Helvetia directed by Claude Mignot
- La belle si nous étions written by Sibylle Blanc, Théâtre de Beausobre Morges

2010

- La R'vue de Genève written by Gaspard Boesch, Casino-théâtre Geneva
- Merlin ou la Terre Dévastée written by Georges Guerreiro, Théâtre du Loup Geneva (Berthe/Blachefleur)

2009

- La R'vue de Genève written by Philippe Cohen, Casino-théâtre Geneva
- I Tube You written by Gaspard Boesch, Casino-théâtre Geneva (Wiki)

2008

- Le Bourge Gentilmec written by Philippe Cohen, la Salle Centrale Madeleine Geneva (Magenta, the danse teacher, Nicole and Dorimène)
- Panique au Plazza written by Ray Cooney, Touring Switzerland (Mlle Morisot)

2007

- Honour written by J. Murray-Smith, Théâtre Pull Off Lausanne, Théâtre de Beausobre Morges, Théâtre Benno Besson Yverdon-les-Bains, CO2 Bulle, directed by G. Dyson (Claudia)
- Valse à trois tons, directed by Claude Mignot
- Exode written by Laurence Vevey, directed by René Flaquet

2006

- L'Art du Succès (The Art of Success) written by N. Dear, Théâtre Pull Off Lausanne, Théâre de Valère Sion, Théâtre de Beausobre Morges, Théâtre Benno Besson Yverdon-les-Bains, directed by G. Dyson (Sarah)
- Les onze petits nègres (The eleven little negros) written by P. Naftule and P. Bernheim (comedy based on A. Christie's And Then There Were None), Théâtre Pitoeff Geneva, directed by P. Naftule (Natacha)

2005

- Irma la Douce written by A. Breffort, Théâtre de Beausobre Morges, directed by G. Demierre (Irma)
- Les Sept Jours de Simon Labrosse (The seven days of Simon Labrosse) written by C. Fréchette, Lausanne, directed by Hedi Gharbi (Nathalie)

2004

- Topaze written by M. Pagnol, Théâtre de L'Orangerie Geneva, directed by F. Polier (Ernestine plus a number of minor characters)
- Ruby Moon written by M. Cameron, Théâtre Pull Off Lausanne, directed by G. Dyson (The Female Roles)

2003

- La Revue de Cuche et Barbezat (The Revue of Cuche and Barbezat), Théâtre du Passage Neuchâtel, directed by M. Guigon (various roles)
- Marylin et le savant (Marylin and the scientist) written by J. Naguel, Théâtre du Jorat Mézières, Théâtre Benno Besson Yverdon-les-Bains, directed by J. Chollet (Marylin)
- Va et Vient (Come and Go) written by S. Beckett, Théâtre Alhambra Geneva, directed by C. De Cesare
- La Nuit des Rois (Twelfth Night) written by W. Shakespeare, Théâtre du Grütli Geneva, directed by S. Bujard (Olivia)

2002

- La Mégère apprivoisée (Taming of the Shrew) written by W. Shakespeare, Théâtre des Amis Carouge, directed by R. Pastor (Bianca)
- La Nuit des Rois (Twelfth Night) written by W. Shakespeare, Festival de la Côte Aubonne, directed by S. Bujard (Olivia)
- Les nouvelles brèves de comptoir (The news at the counter), Théâtre Boulimie Lausanne, directed by L. Golovtchiner (various roles)

2001

- Boudu sauvé des eaux (Boudu saved from drowning) written by René Fauchois, Théâtre des amis Carouge, directed by R.Pastor (Anne-Marie)
- Les Glissements de Bob Metalbiif (The slips of Bob Metalbiif) based on F. Dostoïevski, Théâtre de la Parfumerie Geneva, directed by S. Amodio (the landlady and the baker)
- Nocturne de femme (Night of woman) written by A. Ruccello, Théâtre du Grütli Geneva, directed by S. Amodio (Giovanna)

2000

- La Revue 2000 (The Revue 2000), Casino-théâtre Geneva, directed by D. Bauhofer choreography by C. Eybert J. Fowler songs by R. Seidel (various roles)
- Les Glissements de Bob Metalbiif (The slips of Bob Metalbiif) based on F. Dostoïevski, Neuchâtel International Fantasy Film Festival Neuchâtel, directed by S. Amodio (the landlady and the baker)
- Vu du Pont (A view from the bridge) written by A. Miller, Théâtre de Carouge Carouge, directed by M. Rossi (Catherine)

1999

- (in French)L'annonce faite à Marie (The Annunciation Of Marie) written by P. Claudel, Pontarlier and CDN of Besançon, France, directed by P. Louis (Violaine)
- (in French)Électre (Electra) written by J. Giraudoux, Théâtre de Vidy Lausanne, G. Desarthe (Agathe)

1998

- Il est important d'être aimé (The Importance of Being Earnest) written by O. Wilde, Théâtre Benno Besson Yverdon-les-Bains, directed by P. Bauer (Cecily Cardew)

1997

- La famille Schroffenstein (The Schroffenstein Family) written by H. von Kleist, Théâtre du Grütli Geneva, directed by V. Rossier (Agnès Schroffenstein)

1996

- Titus Andronicus written by W. Shakespeare, Théâtre du Loup Geneva, directed by V. Rossier (the nurse)
- Roméo et Juliette (Romeo and Juliet) written by W. Shakespeare, Touring France, Switzerland and Germany, directed by V. Rossier (Juliette)

1995

- Le Roi Lear (King Lear) written by W. Shakespeare, Théâtre Pitoëff Geneva, directed by F. Polier (Cordélia)
- Roméo et Juliette (Romeo and Juliet) written by W. Shakespeare, Théâtre Am Stram Gram Geneva, directed by V. Rossier (Juliette)

=== Film ===
2014

- Sam feature film directed by E. Hazanov (Corinne)

2011

- Bob & les Sex Pistaches feature film directed by Y. Matthey (La bunny)

2008

- 17, Rue de l'Aubépines short film F. Taghavi (the lady)

2007

- L'infiltré feature film D. Othenin-Girard
- Les petites vacances feature film Y. Matthey
- Max short film J-P Cardinaux (the mother)

2006

- Inside short film directed by L. Rivière (Marion)

2005

- Mon beau chalet short film directed by F. Maire et J. Surchat (the lawyer)
- La peau de l'ours short film directed by G. Daubeuf (Margot)

2003

- Love Express feature film directed by E. Hazanov (Anouk)

2002

- Lipchitz: Le Boucher short film directed by E. Hazanov (The butcher's wife)

2001

- La compagnie des ombres (The Shadows Company) short film directed by Christophe Perrier (Francine)
- The Adversary feature film directed by N. Garcia (the waitress)
- 20 balles de l'heure feature film directed by Frédéric Landenberg (the mother) in the dogma 95 style
- Misogynes feature film directed by E. Hazanov (the teacher's daughter) in the dogma 95 style
- Jungle feature film directed by Vincent Pluss in the dogma 95 style

2000

- Merci pour le chocolat feature film directed by C. Chabrol (Nathalie)

1999

- Salade(s) Russe(s) short film directed by E. Hazanov (Vanessa)
- Les vacances de Sam short film directed by G. Daubeuf (Helen)

1998

- La mort de Ludovic short film directed by Gavillet (Ludovic's colleague)
- La toilette zone série short film directed by X. Ruiz
- Attention aux chiens feature film directed by F-C Marzal (the tobacconist)

=== Television ===
2009-2010

- TSR T'es pas la Seule comedy directed by Pierre-Antoine Hiroz (Maxine)

2008

- TSR Photo Sévices comedy directed by Stéphane Riethauser and Laurent Deshusses (Christelle)

2007

- TSR Fitness Senteur comedy directed by G. Louvin (Stéphanie)
- France 2/TSR Heidi series directed by A. Deluz (the rafter)

2006

- TSR Centenaire et toujours...Jaune! documentary directed by A. Bordier (the passenger)
- France 2/TSR Des fleurs pour Algernon telefilm directed by D. Delrieux (the prostitute)

2005

- France 2 La famille Zappon comedy directed by P. Légitimus Zoé (Claire Zappon)
- TF1 Zodiaque 2: Le Maître du Zodiaque series
- TSR Marilou sitcom written by J. Surchat directed by Y. Mathey

2004

- France 2 Vénus et Appolon (Venus and Apollo) series directed by Tonie Marshall
- TSR Matélé sitcom written by J-A Blanchet and L. Nicolet directed by Y. Mathey
- France 3/TSR (in French)Bien dégagé derrière les oreilles telefilm directed by Anne Deluz (Nathalie)
- TSR Les Pique-Meurons sitcom Yaka productions (Nadine)

2001

- TSR Paul et Virginie sitcom written by J-A BLanchet directed by Y. Mathey (Anne-So)
- TSR Les Pique-Meurons sitcom Yaka productions (Nadine)

2000

- TSR Paul et Virginie sitcom written by J-A BLanchet directed by Y. Mathey (Anne-So)
- TSR Les Pique-Meurons sitcom Yaka productions (Nadine)
- France 2/TSR Sauvetage series directed by H. Delaugardière (Frédérique)

1999

- France 2/RTBF/TSR Les hirondelles d'hiver telefilm directed by A. Chandelle (the bride)

1996-1998

- TSR (in French)Bigoudi sitcom directed by L.Gabriele/S.Matteuzzi (Laura)

=== Radio ===
2004-2014

- Radio Télévision Suisse Les Dicodeurs

2006-2007

- Lausanne FM Les Matinales (co-host)

2001

- Radio NRJ Le 6-9 (co-host)
