= The Butterfly's Dream =

The Butterfly's Dream can refer to:

- The Butterfly's Dream (1994 film), a 1994 Italian film
- The Butterfly's Dream (2013 film), a 2013 Turkish film

== See also ==
- "The Butterfly Dream", a story from the 3rd century BC Chinese text Zhuangzi
