= Hans-Reinhart-Ring =

The Hans-Reinhart-Ring (in French: Anneau Hans-Reinhart; in Italian: Anello Hans Reinhart; in Romansh: Anè da Hans Reinhart) is a Swiss award in theatre. Since 2014 it is part of the Swiss Theater Awards as the Grand Award for Theater/Hans Reinhardt Ring.

Following a grant by the poet and patron Hans Reinhart (1880–1963), the ring honors a noted personality in the field. It was awarded since 1957 by the "Schweizerische Gesellschaft für Theaterkultur" (Société Suisse du Théâtre, Società Svizzera di Studi Teatrali, Societad Svizra per Cultura da Teater). Unlike the Iffland-Ring, a new ring is custom made for each laureate. It is now awarded by the federal jury for theater, and given by a representative of the above-mentioned Swiss society for theater.

== Laureates ==
- 1957: Margrit Winter
- 1958: Leopold Biberti
- 1959: Traute Carlsen
- 1960: Käthe Gold
- 1961: Marguerite Cavadaski
- 1962: Heinrich Gretler
- 1963: Ernst Ginsberg
- 1964: Michel Simon
- 1965: Maria Becker
- 1966: Max Knapp
- 1967: Lisa Della Casa
- 1968: Charles Apothéloz
- 1969: Leopold Lindtberg
- 1970: Ellen Widmann
- 1971: Rolf Liebermann
- 1972: Carlo Castelli
- 1973: Inge Borkh
- 1974: Annemarie Düringer
- 1975: Charles Joris
- 1976: Dimitri
- 1977: Max Röthlisberger
- 1978: Edith Mathis
- 1979: Peter Brogle
- 1980: Philippe Mentha
- 1981: Ruodi Barth
- 1982: Heinz Spoerli
- 1983: Reinhart Spörri
- 1984: Ruedi Walter
- 1985: Benno Besson
- 1986: Annemarie Blanc
- 1987: Werner Düggelin
- 1988: Emil Steinberger
- 1989: François Rochaix
- 1990: Gardi Hutter
- 1991: Bruno Ganz
- 1992: (not awarded)
- 1993: Paul Roland
- 1994: Ketty Fusco
- 1995: Rolf Derrer
- 1996: Mathias Gnädinger
- 1997: Luc Bondy
- 1998: Werner Hutterli
- 1999: Gerd Imbsweiler and Ruth Oswalt
- 2000: Werner Strub
- 2001: Peter Schweiger
- 2002: Anna Huber
- 2003: Gisèle Sallin and Véronique Mermoud
- 2004: Brigitta Luisa Merki
- 2005: Dominique Catton
- 2006: Roger Jendly
- 2007: Giovanni Netzer
- 2008: Nadja Sieger, Urs Wehrli and Tom Ryser
- 2009: Jean-Marc Stehlé
- 2010: Volker Hesse
- 2011: Christoph Marthaler
- 2012: Daniele Finzi Pasca
- 2013: Yvette Théraulaz
- 2014: Omar Porras
- 2015: Rimini Protokoll with Stefan Kaegi
- 2016: Theater HORA
- 2017: Ursina Lardi
- 2018: Theater Sgaramusch
- 2019: Yan Duyvendak
- 2020: Jossi Wieler
- 2021: Martin Zimmermann
- 2022: Barbara Frey
- 2023: Cindy Van Acker
- 2024: Lilo Baur
- 2025: Thomas Hauert
