= Le Temps =

Swiss French-language daily newspaper

- Type: Daily newspaper
- Format: Berliner
- Owner: Fondation Aventinus
- Publisher: Le Temps SA
- Editor-in-chief: Madeleine von Holzen
- Founded: 18 March 1998; 28 years ago
- Political alignment: Centre; social liberalism
- Language: French
- Headquarters: Avenue du Bouchet 2; 1209 Geneva
- Country: Switzerland
- ISSN: 1423-3967 (print); 1663-3997 (web)
- OCLC number: 38739976
- Website: www.letemps.ch

Le Temps (French pronunciation: [lə tɑ̃], lit. 'The Time') is a Swiss French-language daily newspaper published in Berliner format in Geneva by Le Temps SA. The paper was launched in 1998, formed out of the merger of two other newspapers, Journal de Genève et Gazette de Lausanne and Le Nouveau Quotidien (the former being a merger of two other papers), as those papers were facing financial problems.

It is the sole nationwide French-language non-specialised daily newspaper of Switzerland. Since 2021, it has been owned by Fondation Aventinus, a not-for-profit organisation. Le Temps is considered a newspaper of record in Switzerland.

== History ==
=== Predecessor papers ===
The paper's three predecessors were the Gazette de Lausanne (founded 1798), the Journal de Genève (founded 1826), and Le Nouveau Quotidien (founded 1991). The Gazette de Lausanne and the Journal de Genève were merged in 1991 as the Journal de Genève et Gazette de Lausanne, which was partially motivated by those paper's financial issues as well as the impending creation of Le Nouveau Quotidien. Due to financial issues, it was proposed that the Journal de Genève and Le Nouveau Quotidien merge in 1996. The editorial staff of both papers met, but this was declined by publisher Edipresse as it would have resulted in layoffs. In 1997, the papers again proposed a merger, as they were both facing financial troubles, and it was agreed they would the next year.

The editor-in-chief of the news magazine L'Hebdo, Eric Hoesli, became the director and editor-in-chief of their new combined paper, then provisionally named the Nouveau Journal, to be headquartered in Geneva. Hoesli had formerly worked for the NQ. The editors-in-chief of the two merged papers, Ignace Jeannerat and Campiotti, were to assist him. The JdG's company and Edipresse would each own 47% of the new title, with the future editorial team having 6%. Hoesli expressed that the new paper should not be a patchwork of the old two, but an entirely new publication. The Competition Commission accepted the merger in December 1997, as despite the fact that it gave Edipresse an advantage the JdG was unlikely to survive given the market conditions, so it was the least harmful option. In February 1998 the NQ and the JdG were discontinued, with their successor, Le Temps, formed the next month.

=== Later ===
The first issue of Le Temps was printed 18 March 1998. Hoesli was followed as editor-in-chief by Jean-Jacques Roth, starting in 2002. Roth was succeeded in 2010 by Pierre Veya. Chairman of the board of directors was David de Pury (diplomat), a Swiss businessman and diplomat, who played a key role in establishing the paper’s governance structure. Then succeeded by Gilbert Coutau in 2001, himself succeeded by Stéphane Garelli in 2001.

Edipresse held 47% of shares in the paper until 2011, when it was sold to Tamedia. It was bought by Ringier AG in 2014. In 2016, Ringier and Axel Springer founded a joint venture, which became the owner of Le Temps. In the late 2010s, the paper's advertising revenue and subscriber count began to decline, resulting in serious financial problems. Its subscriptions numbered 20,000, a decrease of half compared to five years prior, with the number dropping further to 14,000 in 2020. The COVID-19 pandemic reduced its advertising revenues 80% for the French Swiss press. The paper was agreed to be bought by a private non-profit foundation, Fondation Aventinus, in November 2020. It was acquired in January 2021, for an estimated 6.5 million euros. All staff, which numbered about 100, were transferred to a new company established in Geneva. Following this ownership change print production became more detached from web content.

In May 2026, they launched a special digital edition of the paper for France, as a large portion of the paper's audience is based in France.

== Organization ==
Its publishing company is Le Temps SA. In 2021, Le Temps SA also acquired the news portal Heidi.news, which had been created in 2019. The paper is accessible digitally from the website letemps.ch, and also has a mobile app. Le Temps digitised the archives of its three predecessors. With assistance of the Swiss National Library and regional libraries, it gives free access to these papers on the internet at www.letempsarchives.ch since 2016.

Until march 2025, it was printed by Tamedia printing works in Bussigny. Since then, it is printed in the DZB printing center in Bern. It was an early adopter of digital first production, where content is first produced for digital platforms before being printed. Le Temps prints on weekdays, but also has a separate Saturday issue.

=== Editors-in-chief ===
The newspaper's former and current editors-in-chief are:

- Eric Hoesli (1998–2002)
- Jean-Jacques Roth (2002–2010)
- Pierre Veya (2010–2015)
- Stéphane Benoit-Godet and Gaël Hurlimann (2015–2020)
- Madeleine von Holzen (2021–present)

== Recognition ==
Le Temps is considered a newspaper of record in Switzerland. According to the Research Department on Public Opinion and Society (FÖG) of the University of Zurich, it is of "high quality".

The circulation of Le Temps was 45,970 copies in 2006. Its circulation was 45,506 copies in 2009, 44,450 in 2010 (with 87% subscriptions). In 2013 the paper had a paid circulation of 36,391 copies. In 2025, the circulation is 35,667.

== See also ==
- Neue Zürcher Zeitung, the German-language Swiss newspaper of record
