= Le Nouveau Quotidien =

Swiss newspaper

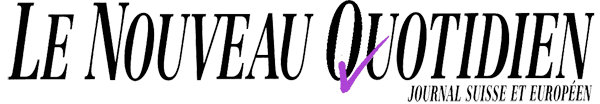

- Front page of the Le Nouveau Quotidien on 6 September 1995
- Type: Daily newspaper
- Publisher: Edipresse
- Editor-in-chief: Jacques Pilet
- Founded: 21 September 1991
- Ceased publication: 27 February 1998
- Language: French
- Headquarters: Lausanne
- Country: Switzerland
- Circulation: 30,000 (as of c. 1991)
- ISSN: 1423-3959
- OCLC number: 1194855365

Le Nouveau Quotidien (transl. The New Daily) was a Swiss French-language daily newspaper founded in September 1991, published out of Lausanne. It was published by Edipresse, with the French newspaper Libération and the media group Ringier also having financial interest and collaboration with its publication. It was a non-regional paper, aiming to cover the interests of French-speaking Switzerland. The editor-in-chief of the paper throughout most of its life was Jacques Pilet, who was replaced in 1997 by Alain Campiotti.

Following financial difficulties that faced both papers, it was merged in March 1998 with the Journal de Genève et Gazette de Lausanne, its more conservative competitor, to form Le Temps.

== History ==
Following the paper's announcement, it was heavily anticipated in Francophone Switzerland. Shortly after the announcement of the launch of the daily, two other papers, the Journal de Genève and the Gazette de Lausanne merged to form the Journal de Genève et Gazette de Lausanne, as the proposed paper was deemed to target a similar audience and they wished to gain more readers.

The paper aimed for sales of 30,000 every day and an additional 10,000 for Sunday sales. Several titles were proposed for the paper, including Le Temps, L'indépendant, L'événement, Le quotidien, and Aujourd'hui; Le Nouveau Quotidien (lit. 'The New Daily') was eventually decided on, as that was what the press had already called it for several months at that point, and they deemed it an advertising advantage.

=== Launch ===
The first issue was released 24 September 1991. Initially, the paper was distributed every day except Monday. At launch, the paper had about 30 journalists on its staff. It was published by Edipresse, though the French paper Libération and the Swiss media group Ringier also had financial involvement in the publication; Edipresse's budget for the paper was 30 million Swiss francs. Its headquarters were in the west of Lausanne. It had an agreement for collaboration with Libération involving article exchange and a Swiss correspondent to that paper, in order to bring a "Swiss perspective" to French politics. The paper was not regional and did not stick to any specific location in its coverage. It aimed at covering topics related to the interests of the Romandy, but also broader political issues beyond Switzerland's borders. Its primary competition was the more conservative Journal de Genève. Jacques Pilet was its editor-in-chief. Jean-Michel Bonvin was the paper's singular correspondent to Valais.

Its first year was a success, with ad volumes and sales targets being reached; it had 25,000 subscribers and 10,000 single-issue sales per day a year after being launched. Shortly after the launch of the paper, it had a circulation of 30,000. Its readership was primarily male and from the ages of 14-34, largely from the regions of Vaud and Geneva. Its price was low at 175 Swiss francs for five issues, cheaper than most of the important daily papers at the time. This low price was made up for with above average advertising volumes and lower overhead cost; it had a smaller than average editorial staff, which as of a year after its launch was made up of 40 people.

=== Financial issues and merger ===
In May 1993, the paper was changed to publish on Mondays but not weekends, to come into effect the next month; this was attributed to the habits of the readership and increases in distribution costs. The Sunday edition was not profitable and sales were below expectations, though weekday sales were fine. This would make the NQ one of only a few dailies in Switzerland to run five times a week; only a few ran all seven days, while most ran six. According to Pilet this would lessen the strain on the workers, and advertisers did not utilize the weekend editions. An additional 16 page supplement, Le Nouveau Vendredi, was to be introduced to replace one of the removed Sunday sections. According to Pilet this would lessen the strain on the workers, and advertisers did not utilize the weekend editions. To compensate for this existing subscriptions were lengthened. That year, the paper sold 36,000 weekly copies and 30,000 Sunday copies; of the weekly copies sold, 26,000 were to subscribers, half of whom paid extra for the Sunday edition.

The paper recorded losses in 1996; it did not reach its break-even point, though the publisher claimed it would soon do so. It was proposed that the Journal de Genève (JdG) and the NQ merge in 1996. The editorial staff of both papers met, but this was declined by Edipresse as it would have resulted in layoffs. In 1997, Pilet was replaced as editor-in-chief by Alain Campiotti. Later that year, the papers again proposed a merger, as they were both facing financial troubles, and it was agreed they would the next year. The editor-in-chief of the news magazine L'Hebdo, Eric Hoesli, would become the director and editor-in-chief of their new combined paper, provisionally named the Nouveau Journal, to be headquartered in Geneva. Hoesli had formerly worked for the NQ. The editors-in-chief of the two merged papers, Ignace Jeannerat and Campiotti, were to assist him. The merger strengthened Edipresse's position in the French-speaking news market. The JdG's company and Edipresse company would each own 47% of the new title, with the future editorial team having 6%. Hoesli expressed that the new paper should not be a patchwork of the old two, but an entirely new publication.

The Swiss federation of journalists said they "deeply regretted" the loss of the two papers. The NQ editorial company expressed their concerns about employment; The editors of the JdG went on a "signature strike" over potential job losses as a response to this, which lasted for six weeks; the editors signed their articles collectively as a sign of solidarity. They complained that their efforts to combat the merger were ignored, and that there had been new editorial projects being prepared; they also said the JdG had been moving towards a more balanced economic position and that it should be maintained. Its editorial society denounced a trend of "transforming newspapers into products", and that by merging their 170-year history paper had been integrated "into the Edipresse machine".

The Competition Commission accepted the merger in December 1997, as despite the fact that it gave Edipresse an advantage the JdG was unlikely to survive given the market conditions, so it was the least harmful option; the two conditions imposed by the CC were that any change in the capital structure of the new publication had to be authorized by them, and that the chairman of the board of the directors would be independent of the shareholders. 32 jobs were to be lost as a result of this merger. In February 1998 the NQ and the JdG were discontinued, to be combined to form Le Temps the next month. Its final issue was published 27 February 1998. The new paper was expected to have 90 journalist positions and a circulation of 50,000. Jacques Pilet attributed its failure to find success to the economic issues Switzerland faced in the 1990s, and expressed thanks to both the editors and readers of the paper.

The paper's digitized archives are available on the Le Temps Archives website.

== Style and design ==
Its formatting resembled the formatting of the French paper Le Monde. It utilized black and white photography, and had 32 pages. It had five main sections, covering politics, the economy, society and culture, events of the day, and an opinion column. The paper stood out from the other papers through its comparatively limited use of photography, and its usage of dark mauve coloring.

== Recognition ==
The paper had a high reputation for its standards and its coverage of a variety of topics, including its business section and opinion journalism. It was viewed as a compliment to Switzerland's many regional papers.
