= Peter Brogle =

Swiss actor

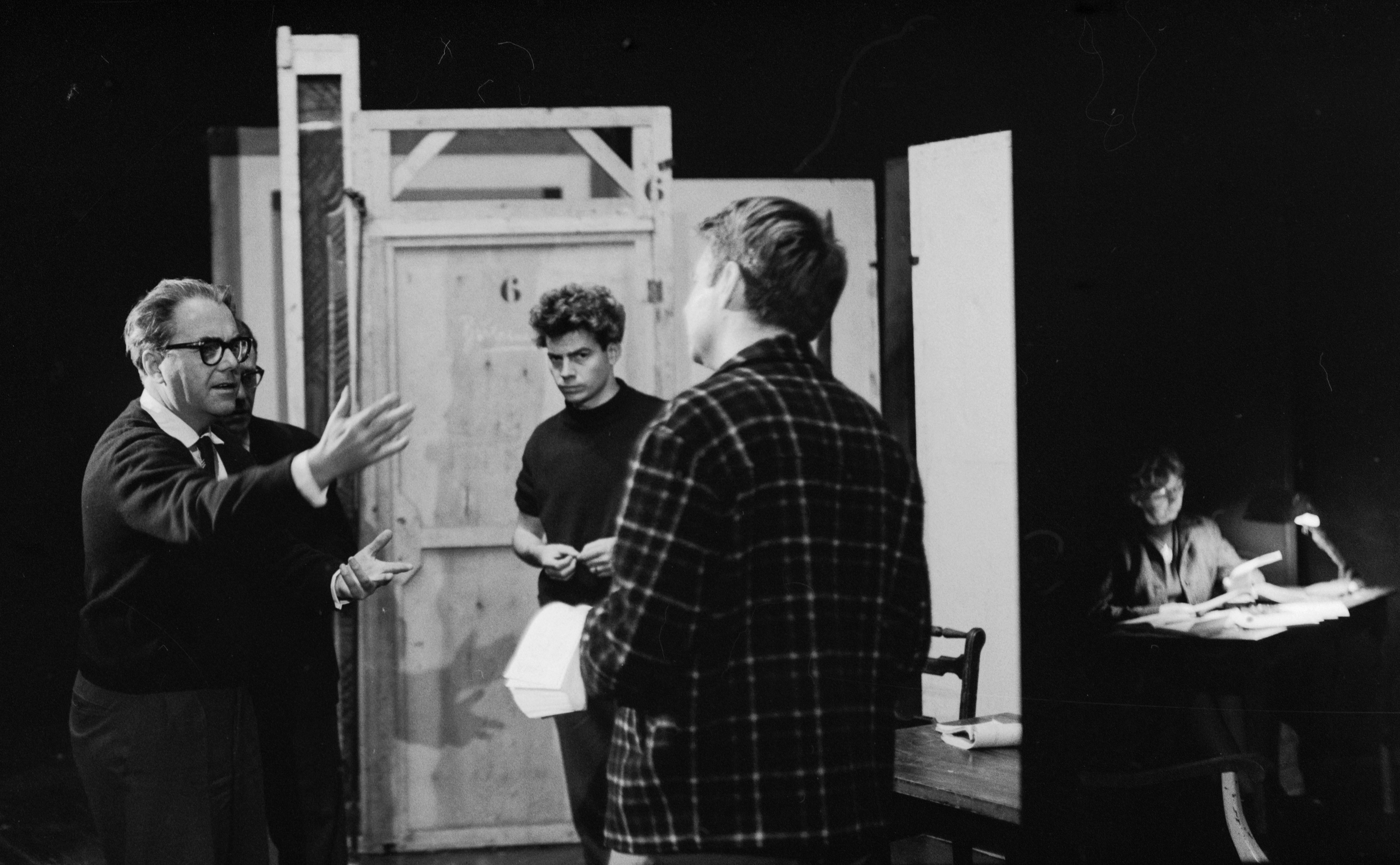
- Peter Brogle in the background during rehearsals for Andorra (1961), Max Frisch on the left
- Born: 22 June 1933; Basel, Switzerland
- Died: 27 March 2006 (aged 72); Zürich, Switzerland
- Education: Zurich University of the Arts
- Occupation: Actor
- Years active: 1955–1987

Peter Brogle (22 June 1933 – 27 March 2006) was a Swiss film actor. He appeared in 14 films between 1955 and 1987, including starring in the 1968 film Signs of Life by Werner Herzog, which won the Silver Bear Extraordinary Prize of the Jury at the 18th Berlin International Film Festival. In 1979, he won the Hans-Reinhart-Ring theatre award.

== Selected filmography ==
- Signs of Life (1968)
- The Elixirs of the Devil (1976)
