= Ketty Fusco =

Swiss actress (1926–2021)

- Born: 5 August 1926; Naples, Kingdom of Italy
- Died: 18 February 2021 (aged 94); Lugano, Switzerland
- Occupation: Actress

Ketty Fusco (5 August 1926 – 18 February 2021) was an Italian-born Swiss actress, director, and writer.

== Biography ==
At the age of five, Fusco's family was forced to leave Italy due to the rise of fascism and settled in Lugano. As a child, she was chosen to participate in a radio program on Radiotelevisione svizzera, which was called Radio Monte Ceneri at the time. She would end up making a stable career in the field of acting.

In 1989, Fusco received the Maschera d'argento della Sipario prize for lifetime achievement in Milan. In 1994, she was cast in the film The Butterfly's Dream, and starred in the television series Regina madre from 1993 to 1994.

Ketty Fusco died in Lugano on 18 February 2021 at the age of 94.

== Works ==
- Nella luce degli occhi (1962)
- La preistoria sul balcone (1973)
- Giorni della memoria (1974)
- Il caminetto che canta (1994)
- Acrostici (1995)
- Lettera a zia Eva (1995)
- Natale (1995)
- Giove in via Nassa (1996)
- In quell'albergo sul fiume (1999)
- Storia di Dolly (1999)
- Umca: storia di una capra intraprendente (2002)
- La preistoria sul balcone (2006)
- L'isola degli ottanta (2007)
- La bambina e le bombe: assaggi di vita e racconti (2007)
- Arco e Baleno sulle orme di Ulisse (2007)

== Honors ==
- Hans-Reinhart-Ring of the Società Svizzera di Studi Teatrali (1994)
