= Théâtre de Vidy =

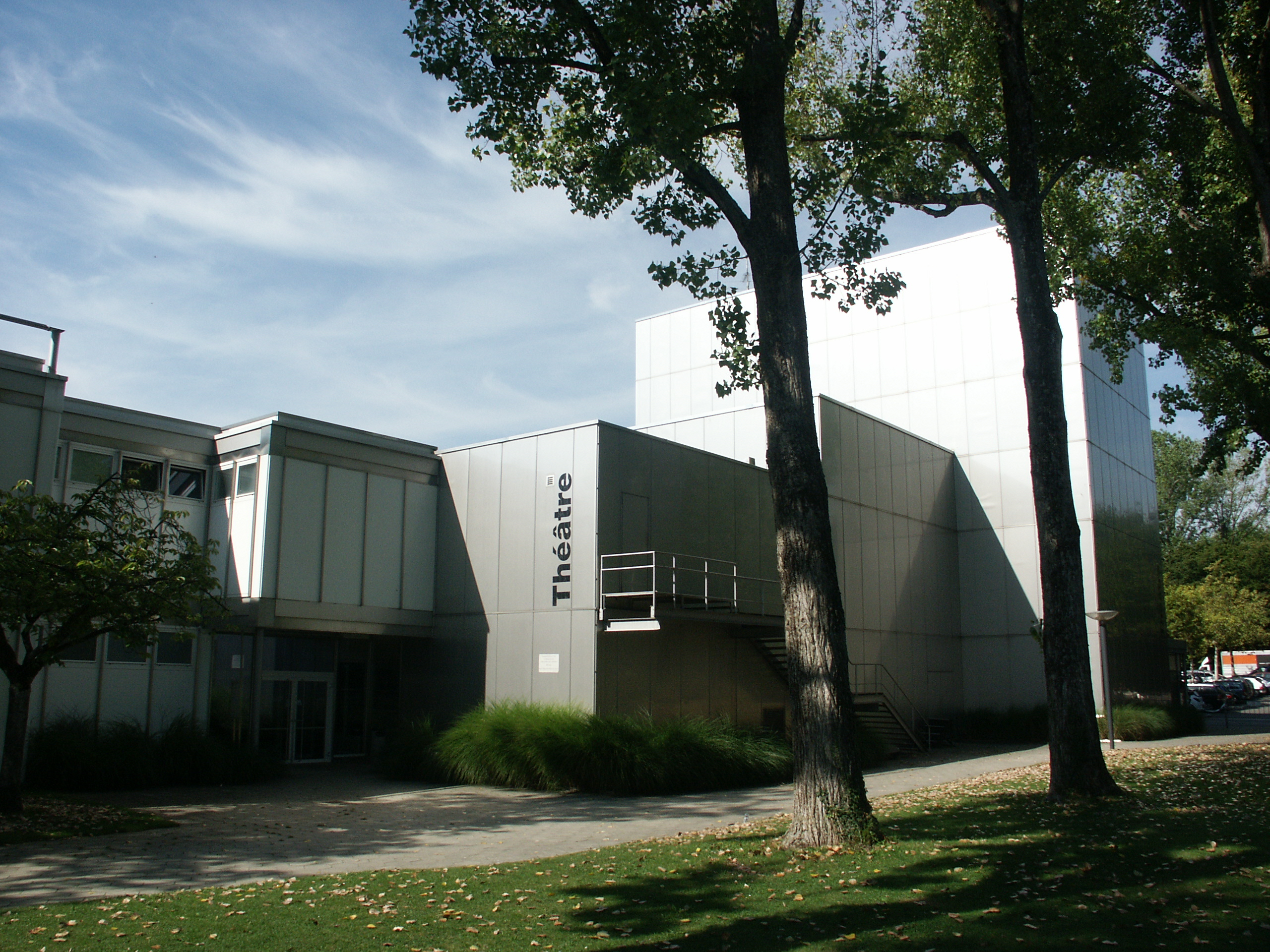
- Théâtre Vidy-Lausanne
- Interactive map of Théâtre de Vidy
- Address: Lausanne
- Coordinates: 46.512762°N 6.611113°E
- Capacity: 400 (Charles Apothéloz), 100 (La Passerelle), 100 (René Gonzalez), and 250 (Pavilion) seats
- Executive suites: 4
- Type: Theatre

Construction
- Opened: 1964
- Architect: Max Bill

Website
- http://www.vidy.ch

The Vidy-Lausanne Theatre, formerly known as the Centre dramatique de Lausanne, is a Swiss theater and choreography creation center located on the shores of Lake Geneva in Lausanne. It was created by Max Bill for the 1964 Swiss National Exhibition under its original name, Théâtre de l'Expo.

Since September 2013, under the direction of Vincent Baudriller, Vidy-Lausanne Theatre's programming alternates between internationally known projects and new creations, with a particular focus on young Swiss artists.

The theatre is committed to "an art that confronts the realities of our time." It presents various artistic media – theatre, dance, cinema, music, visual arts.

== Building ==
=== History ===
The Vidy-Lausanne Theatre was designed by the Zurich architect Max Bill as part of the 1964 Swiss National Exhibition, initially known as the Théâtre de l'Expo, originally intended to be a temporary building with an expected lifespan of six months. It was then part of a larger complex located in the exhibition's cultural center.

During the theatre's inauguration, the Vevey-based troupe Les Baladins performed Jacques Aeschlimann's Les Cannibales, directed by André Nusslé. In 1965, at the insistence of Charles Apothéloz, the city of Lausanne purchased the theatre and used it as a rehearsal hall for the Municipal Theatre of Lausanne (TML). Charles Apothéloz established the TML Drama Center there in 1969, which became the Lausanne Drama Center in 1971. It was only renamed Vidy-Lausanne Theatre in the summer of 1989.

In subsequent years, several restorations and renovations were made to the premises to make it a theatre. Notably, an additional rehearsal room adjacent to the main hall was inaugurated in 1996. Since then, the building has been listed as a Swiss cultural property of national significance.

In 2017, the theatre was expanded with a pavilion replacing the old tent that had become unusable. This new modular hall, entirely made of wood, was designed in collaboration with the theatre's teams by architect Yves Weinand, director of the IBOIS laboratory at the École Polytechnique Fédérale de Lausanne, and Atelier Cube (architect Marc-Henri Collomb). The building incorporates new environmentally-friendly construction and assembly methods for wood. This intriguing structure is composed of eleven arches, distinguished by the thinness (45 mm) and lightness of its panels that serve both as cladding and structural supports for a long-span vault (up to 21 m).

=== Halls ===
The main hall of the theatre, now called the "Charles Apothéloz hall," has a capacity of 400 seats. The other halls are "La Passerelle" (100 seats) and the "René Gonzalez" hall (100 seats).

The new pavilion, inaugurated in 2017, is located in the tree-lined park opposite the public entrance of the theatre. With its dimensions (28 meters by 18), retractable seating for 250 people, and stage (14 meters by 12), this space complements the other halls in terms of size and capacity.

Further renovations are planned to bring the salle Charles Apothéloz up to new standards by 2020.

=== Foyer ===
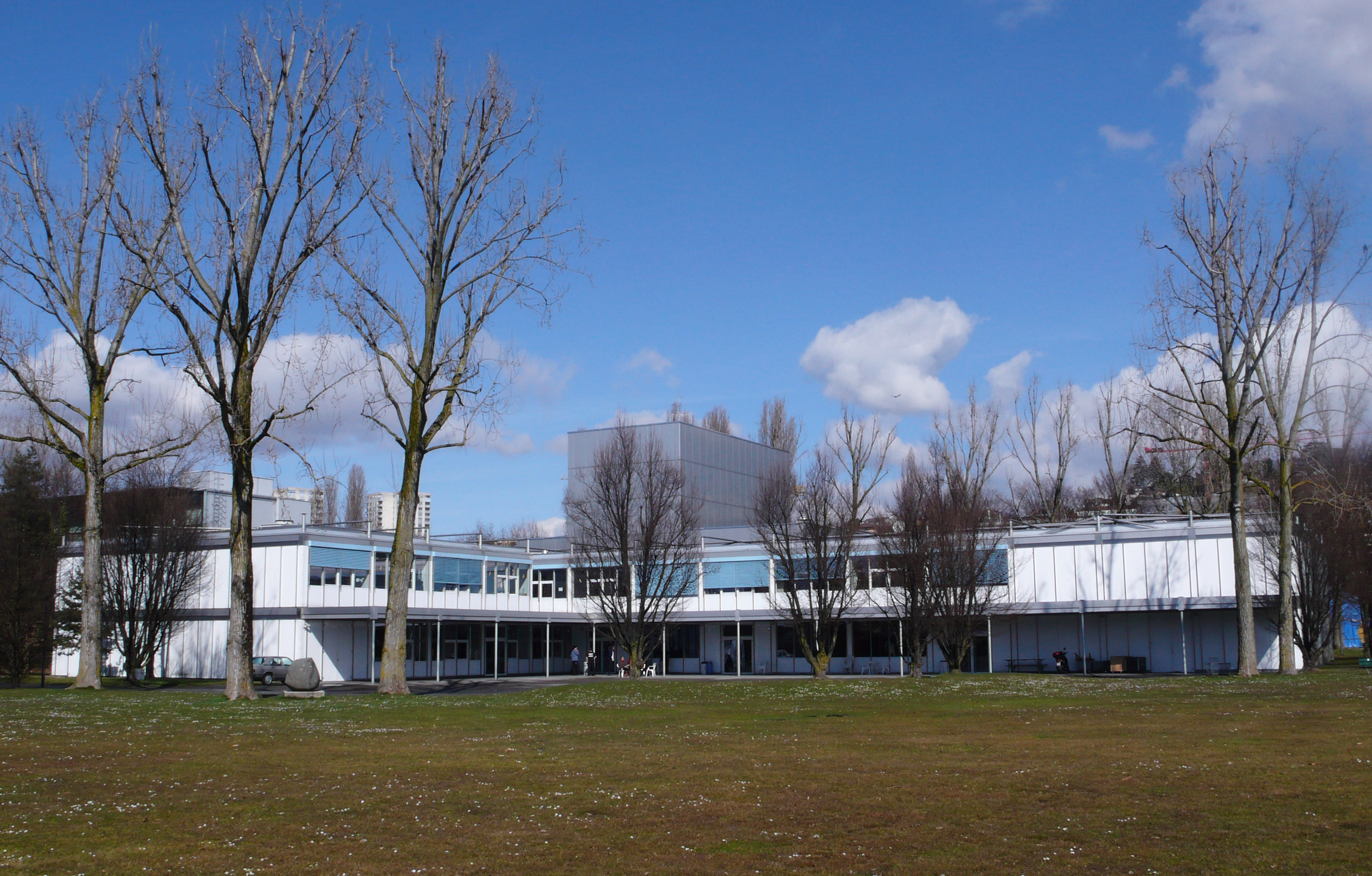
View of the theatre and its lobby from the edge of the lake.

At the intersection of the building and its four performance halls, a central lobby contains the ticket office, the bar-restaurant La Kantina, a bookstore, and an exhibition space. The main window and terrace provide a view of Lake Geneva, Evian, and the French Alps.

== Directors ==
The following information is primarily sourced from: René Zahnd, Vidy, un théâtre au présent. 50 ans d'histoire, Favre, 2015.

- Charles Apothéloz (1964-1975). A key figure in the history of French-Swiss theatre, Charles Apothéloz was both a director, actor, and troupe leader. His intervention saved the Théâtre de Vidy from its planned destruction.
- Franck Jotterand (1975-1981). The Vaudois intellectual and dramaturg Franck Jotterand turned the Théâtre de Vidy into a place of reflection rooted in its territory.
- Pierre Bauer and Jacques Bert (1981-1989). Following Franck Jotterand's fatal accident, Pierre Bauer and Jacques Bert, director and technical director, took over the helm of the Théâtre. They continued their predecessor's work by supporting French-Swiss artists and imagining diverse program offerings.
- Matthias Langhoff (1989-1991). A recognized artist before taking the Theatre's direction, Matthias Langhoff elevated Vidy to the ranks of major international stages.
- René Gonzalez (1990-2012). René Gonzalez remained at the head of the Théâtre de Vidy for 22 years, imbuing the place with his personality. He continued the work of previous directors by focusing on two directions: local theatre roots and international recognition.
- Vincent Baudriller (since 2013). Former director of the Festival d'Avignon, Vincent Baudriller took over Vidy in September 2013.

== Current projects ==
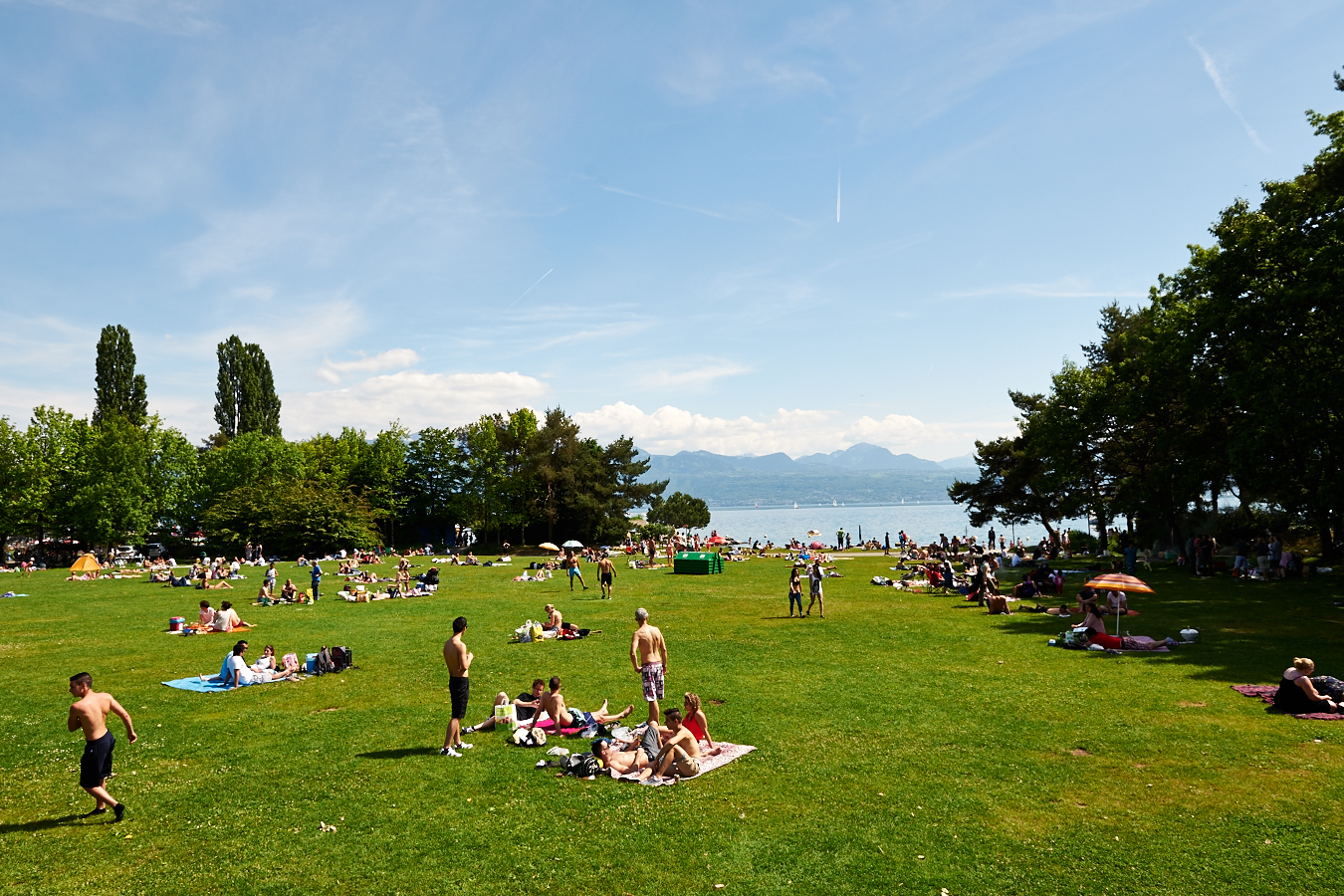
View of Lake Geneva and the Alpes, from the terrace

=== "Theater of creation open to the world" ===
The Théâtre de Vidy is primarily a creative space thanks to its four auditoriums that allow for simultaneous rehearsals and performances, its 1,000 m² construction workshop located in Malley, on the outskirts of Lausanne, and its administrative and technical teams covering all aspects of theatrical production. It defines itself as a space where the issues of today's world resonate to be shared, questioned, and discussed. Additionally, it distributes its productions, with some of its creations touring the world (such as Une île flottante and King size by Christoph Marthaler, Stifters Dinge by Heiner Goebbels, Nachlass by Rimini Protokoll and S. Kaegi, The Seagull by Chekhov directed by Thomas Ostermeier, etc).

The theatre thus welcomes approximately 45,000 spectators per year for around fifty shows and about 300 performances; and approximately 80,000 spectators on tour for nearly 200 performances (in 2015-2016).

Numerous events are organized in response to the shows to extend their resonance, connecting the works with current political or cultural affairs. These include exhibitions, meetings with artists, artist master classes, themed debates, introductions to performances, courses on the history of performing arts, and festive evenings. Additionally, specific mediation work is developed for schools and high schools, fostering homes, universities, teachers, and various associations and communities in Lausanne and the canton of Vaud, including the Établissement vaudois d’accueil des migrants (EVAM).

=== Communal program ===
The Théâtre de Vidy and L'Arsenic initiated an international and multidisciplinary event in the spring of 2015 in collaboration with other cultural structures in Lausanne: "Programme Commun." The next edition of the festival took place from March 23 to April 2, 2017. The Théâtre de Vidy and L'Arsenic was joined by the Théâtre Sévelin 36, La Manufacture, ECAL, and the Swiss Film Archive in this joint programming effort.
