= Pierre-Alain Donnier =

Swiss journalist (1946–1988)

Pierre-Alain Donnier (1 July 1946 – 13 March 1988) was a Swiss journalist who died while reporting from Chad about the United Nations Development Program (PNUD), on 13 March 1988 in the Tibesti region. He was once quoted in the Gazette de Lausanne talking about Swiss journalism and he is the only journalist from Swiss television to have perished while on report. There is a Swiss television award named for him that is widely known.
