= Anna Huber =

Austrian fashion model

- Born: Austria
- Modeling information
- Height: 5 ft 10.5 in (1.79 m)
- Hair color: Dark Brown
- Eye color: Blue/Green

Anna Huber is a model from Austria.

She has appeared in numerous ads such as Azzaro 'Visit' fragrance, Canderel, Calzedonia, Damier Azur, Daniel Swarovski, Devernois, House of Fraser, Hugo Boss 'Intense Shimmer' fragrance, John Galliano, Kérastase, Laura Biagiotti, Lavazza, Linea, Liska, Marks & Spencer, Naf Naf, Nannini, Nina Ricci, and others.
