= Télévision Suisse Romande =

Television network in Switzerland

Télévision Suisse Romande (TSR)
- Type: Broadcast radio and television
- Country: Switzerland
- Founded: 1 November 1954; 71 years ago
- TV stations: RTS 1; RTS 2; RTS Info
- Headquarters: Geneva
- Parent: SRG SSR
- Dissolved: 28 February 2010; 16 years ago
- Official website: www.rts.ch/tv
- Language: Swiss French
- Replaced by: Radio Télévision Suisse (RTS)

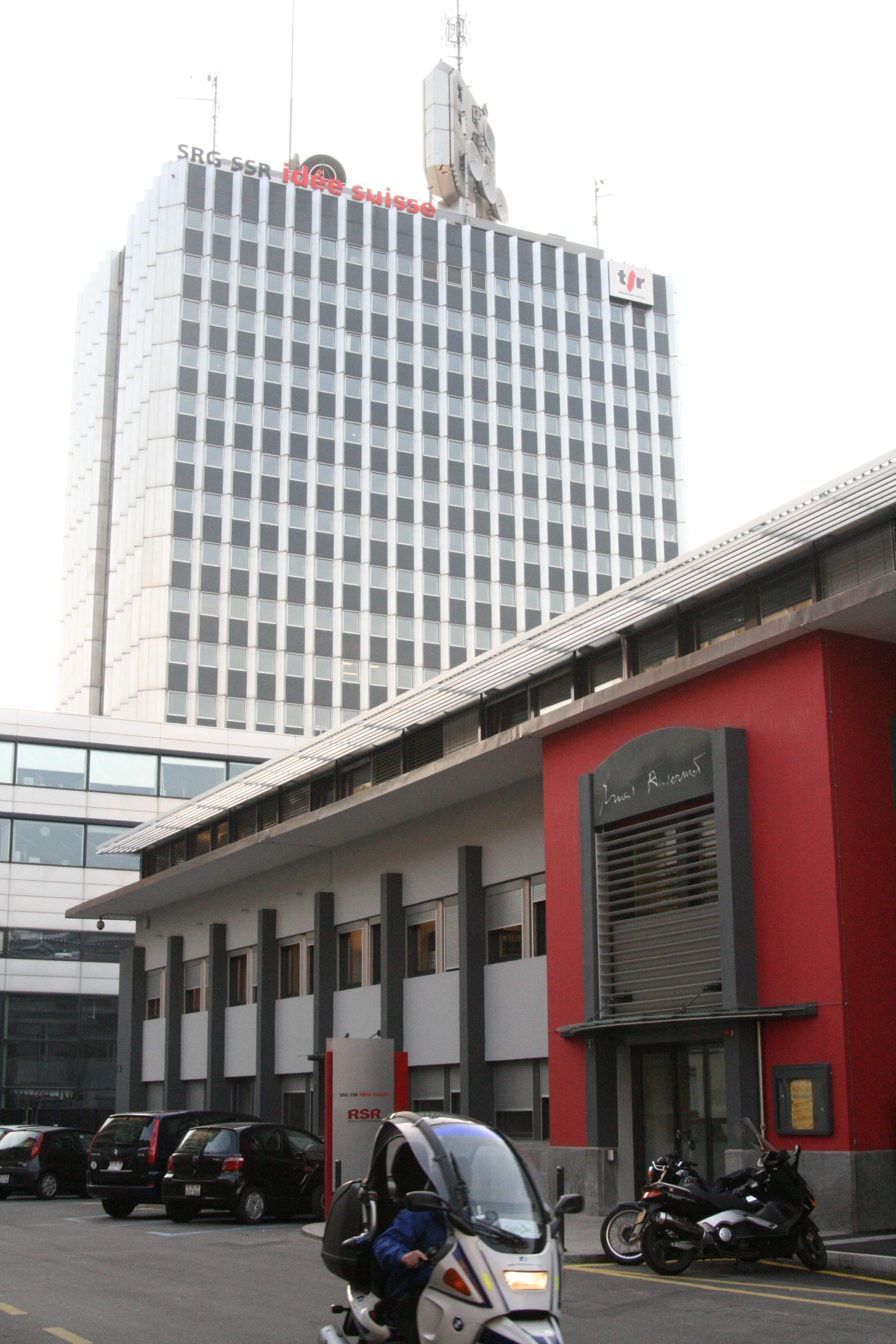
Headquarters of the TSR

Télévision Suisse Romande (French pronunciation: [televizjɔ̃ sɥis ʁɔmɑ̃d], "Swiss Television Romandy") was the French-language division of SRG SSR, in charge of production and distribution of television programmes in Switzerland for French-speaking Switzerland.

TSR operated two main French-language channels: TSR 1 and TSR 2, which became RTS Un and RTS Deux respectively after 2012, and provided content for TV5Monde. Radio Suisse Romande and Télévision Suisse Romande merged on 1 January 2010 to create Radio Télévision Suisse.

== History ==
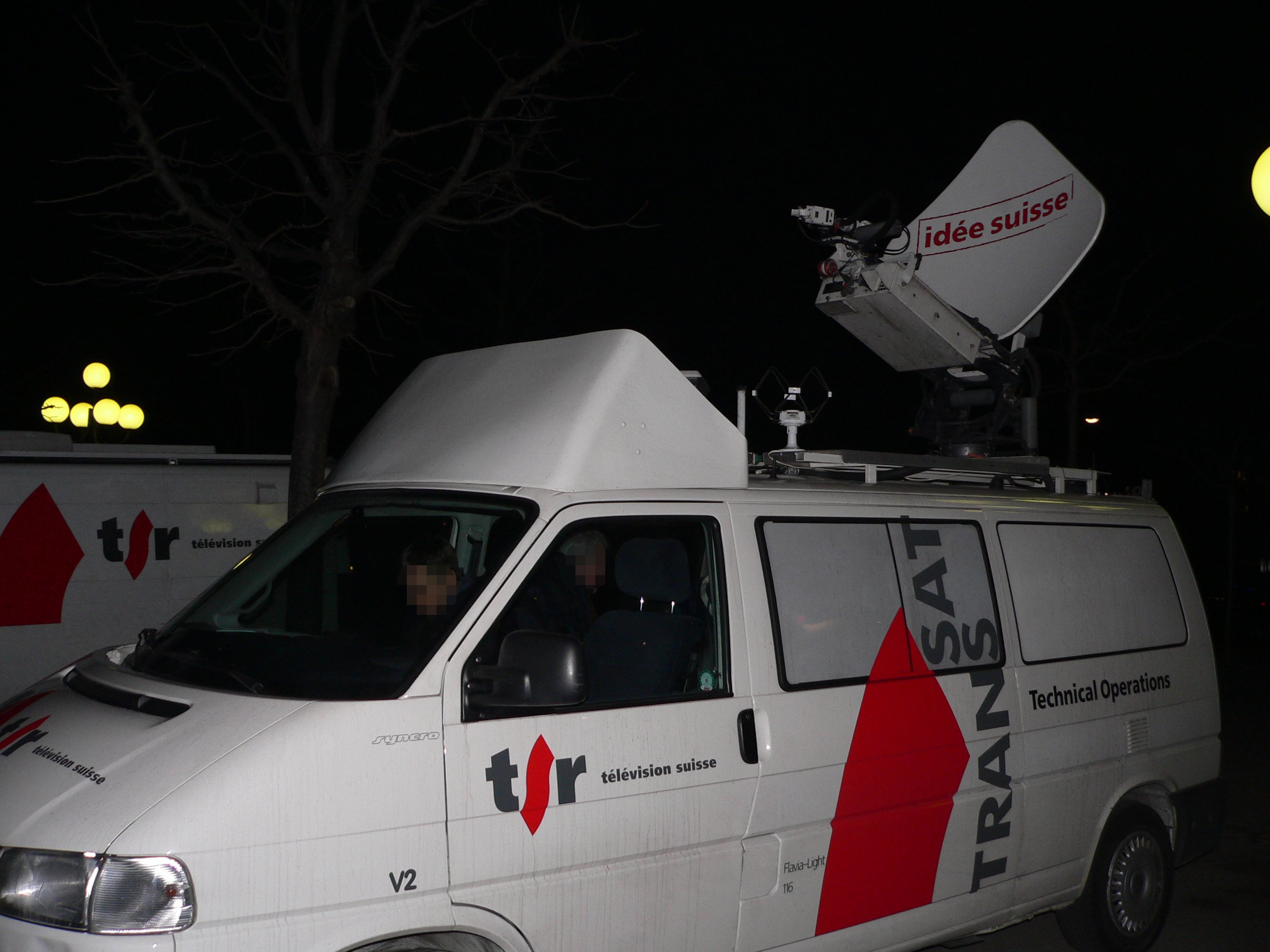
A TSR news van

The first evening programme in colour was broadcast on Télévision Suisse Romande in 1968, which was also the first year in which more than one million Swiss households had a television.

== Programmes ==
The station can be received throughout Switzerland, and also in some neighboring countries.

Some of the popular programmes on TSR are:

- le 12:45, le 19:00 and le 19:30 – news broadcasts
- À Bon Entendeur – a consumer magazine programme (French)
- Temps Présent – a recent events programme (French)
- Passe-moi les jumelles – a travel programme (French)
- Nouvo – a news magazine about new technologies, media and communications (French)
- Infrarouge – a debating programme (French)
- Todas as Taxas Incluídas (TTC) – a weekly programme that explains or talks about a financial aspect (French)
- Magellan – educational show about science, society and technology (French)
- Mise Au Point – news (French)

== See also ==
- Pierre-Alain Donnier
- Sibylle Blanc
- Television in Switzerland
