= The Butterfly's Dream (1994 film) =

1994 film

- Film poster
- Directed by: Marco Bellocchio
- Written by: Massimo Fagioli
- Produced by: Pier Giorgio Bellocchio
- Starring: Thierry Blanc
- Cinematography: Giorgos Arvanitis
- Edited by: Francesca Calvelli
- Music by: Carlo Crivelli
- Release date: 11 May 1994
- Running time: 111 minutes
- Country: Italy
- Language: Italian

The Butterfly's Dream (Italian: Il sogno della farfalla) is a 1994 Italian drama film directed by Marco Bellocchio. It was screened in the Un Certain Regard section at the 1994 Cannes Film Festival.

== Cast ==
- Thierry Blanc - Massimo
- Simona Cavallari - La ragazzina
- Nathalie Boutefeu - Anna
- Roberto Herlitzka - Il padre
- Henry Arnold - Carlo
- Anita Laurenzi - La prima vecchia
- Antonio Pennarella - Lo zingaro
- Michael Seyfried - Il regista
- Aleka Paizi - La pastora (as Aleka Paisi)
- Sergio Graziani - L'ortolano
- Carla Cassola - L'a seconda vecchia
- Giusy Frallonardo - Attrice
- Consuelo Ciatti - Attrice nella parte di Natalia
- Patrizia Punzo - Attrice nella parte dell'elettrice
- Viviana Natale - L'autostoppista
- Ketty Fusco - La terza vecchia
- Michel Adatte
- Bibi Andersson - La madre (participation)
