= Imprimeries Réunies =

Swiss printing and publishing company (1907–2015)

- Formerly: Société de la Feuille d'Avis de Lausanne et des Imprimeries réunies (1907–1972); 24 heures-Imprimeries réunies SA (from 1972)
- Industry: Printing; Publishing; Newspapers
- Founded: 1907
- Headquarters: Lausanne, Switzerland
- Number of employees: 126 (2012)
- Parent: Lousonna (from 1925); Edipresse (from 1982); None (from 2012)

Imprimeries Réunies was a Swiss press, publishing and printing company in Lausanne. It was formed in 1907 as the Société de la Feuille d'Avis de Lausanne et des Imprimeries réunies by the merger of three printing works. From 1982 it belonged to the Edipresse group, and under the name IRL (Imprimeries Réunies Lausanne) it was one of the main press, publishing and printing companies in French-speaking Switzerland. In 2012 IRL was taken over by its managers and became IRL plus, which closed in 2015.

== History ==
The Société de la Feuille d'Avis de Lausanne et des Imprimeries réunies was formed in 1907 by the merger of the printing works of Corbaz & Cie, of Charles Viret-Genton and of Paul Allenspach (Feuille d'Avis de Lausanne). They were joined in 1910 by the printing works of Georges-Antoine Bridel. In 1911 the printing works were brought together in the building of Imprimeries réunies SA.

In 1912 the company took over the Tribune de Lausanne (Le Matin from 1984). In 1925 it was bought by Lousonna, a holding company created by Charles Patru, Jaques Lamunière and Samuel Payot, members of the board of directors of Publicitas, to manage majority holdings in the press and the graphic arts. Lousonna modernized and expanded the printing works.

In 1972 the Feuille d'Avis de Lausanne was renamed 24 heures, and the company's name became 24 heures-Imprimeries réunies SA. From 1982 it belonged to the Edipresse group. Under the name IRL it was one of the main press, publishing and printing companies in French-speaking Switzerland.

In July 2012 the Swissprinters group, IRL's parent company, announced that IRL, based in Renens, would close at the end of the year. With the support of the canton of Vaud and the town of Renens, the company was taken over by its managers and became IRL plus (IRL+), keeping at least 69 of its 126 employees. In July 2015 IRL plus announced that it would close and dismiss its 44 employees.

== Bibliography ==
- Deux cents ans de vie et d'histoire vaudoises: la Feuille d'Avis de Lausanne, 1762–1962, 1962
- J.-P. Chuard, Une odeur d'encre, 1982
