= Charles Apothéloz =

Swiss theater director (1922–1982)

- Born: 30 May 1922; Lausanne, Switzerland
- Died: 24 May 1982 (aged 59); Lausanne, Switzerland
- Occupation: Theater director
- Spouse: Lor Olsommer Anne-Lise Kämpfer
- Awards: Hans Reinhart Ring (1968)

Charles Apothéloz (30 May 1922 – 24 May 1982) was a Swiss theater director from Onnens in the canton of Vaud. He was a central figure in French-speaking Swiss theater in the second half of the 20th century, founding the Compagnie des Faux-Nez and later directing the Centre dramatique romand and the Théâtre de Vidy-Lausanne.

== Biography ==
Apothéloz was the son of Charles Apothéloz, the director of a bandage factory, and Marie Rebillet. He married first the painter and mosaicist Lor Olsommer, daughter of the painter Charles-Clos Olsommer, and second the actress Anne-Lise Kämpfer. In 1949 he received the directing prize at the Concours des Jeunes Compagnies in Paris. After returning to Lausanne, he served several months in prison as a conscientious objector before obtaining his law degree in 1951.

== Theater career ==
In 1953, Apothéloz and his Compagnie des Faux-Nez opened the Caveau des Faux-Nez, where he staged avant-garde repertoire by Michel de Ghelderode, Eugène Ionesco and Samuel Beckett and helped bring forward a new generation of Romand playwrights, including Franck Jotterand and Henri Debluë. He also developed various forms of popular theater. From 1959, he directed the Théâtre municipal de Lausanne, where he gathered the creative forces of the region under the label Centre dramatique romand (CDR). He produced important French-language premieres of works by Max Frisch and Friedrich Dürrenmatt, and received the Hans Reinhart Ring award in 1968. In 1972, the CDR, by then renamed Centre dramatique de Lausanne, moved into the Théâtre de Vidy (built in 1964), which was gradually transformed into a production venue without equal in French-speaking Switzerland. From 1975 on, Apothéloz directed large popular celebrations, including the Fête des Vignerons in Vevey in 1977.

== Bibliography ==
=== Works ===
- Histoire et mythe de la Fête des vignerons, 1977.
- Travail théâtral populaire, 1980.

=== Archives ===
Fonds privé, Archives de la Ville de Lausanne.

=== Further reading ===
J. Aguet (ed.), Cris et écrits, vol. 1. F. Fornerod, Lausanne, 1993, pp. 181–192.
