= Franck Jotterand =

Swiss journalist and theater director

- Born: 28 January 1923; Aubonne, Switzerland
- Died: 13 September 2000 (aged 77); Bière, Switzerland
- Occupations: Journalist, editor, theater director, essayist
- Spouses: Mariane Chabloz; Diana de Rham

Franck Jotterand (28 January 1923 – 13 September 2000) was a Swiss journalist, essayist, and theater director from the canton of Vaud. He served as editor-in-chief of the Gazette littéraire from 1952 to 1972 and as director of the Centre dramatique de Lausanne from 1975 to 1981.

== Biography ==
Born in Aubonne, Jotterand was a citizen of Saint-Livres and the son of Emile Jotterand. He married twice: first to Mariane Chabloz, daughter of the schoolteacher Fernand Chabloz, and later to the journalist Diana de Rham, daughter of Jacques de Rham. He obtained a licentiate in arts in 1949.

From 1949 he worked as the Paris literary correspondent of the Gazette de Lausanne, and from 1952 to 1972 he was editor-in-chief of its literary supplement, the Gazette littéraire. He also contributed to several newspapers and journals, including Die Weltwoche, Le Monde, Le Nouvel Observateur, and La Nouvelle Revue française.

Jotterand wrote a screenplay for Alain Tanner (Ramuz, passage d'un poète, 1961) and texts staged by Charles Apothéloz (Soldats de papier, 1960). His essays include J'aime le cinéma (2 vol., 1962), Georges Ribemont-Dessaignes (1966), and Le Nouveau Théâtre américain (1970). As director of the Centre dramatique de Lausanne (CDL) from 1975 to 1981, he combined the company's own productions and collaborations within French-speaking Switzerland with the hosting of major foreign troupes. A car accident in 1981 forced him to give up all activity. He served as president of the Belles-Lettres society in Lausanne (1945–1946) and at the central level (1947–1948).

== Works ==
- Soldats de papier (1960)
- Ramuz, passage d'un poète (screenplay, 1961)
- J'aime le cinéma, 2 vol. (1962)
- Georges Ribemont-Dessaignes (1966)
- Le Nouveau Théâtre américain (1970)

== Bibliography ==
- Charles Apothéloz; Joël Aguet, ed., Cris et écrits, 1990.
- Jean-Pierre Moulin, ed., Présence de Franck Jotterand, 1997.
- Dictionnaire du théâtre en Suisse (DTS), p. 941.
