= Gazette de Lausanne =

Swiss newspaper

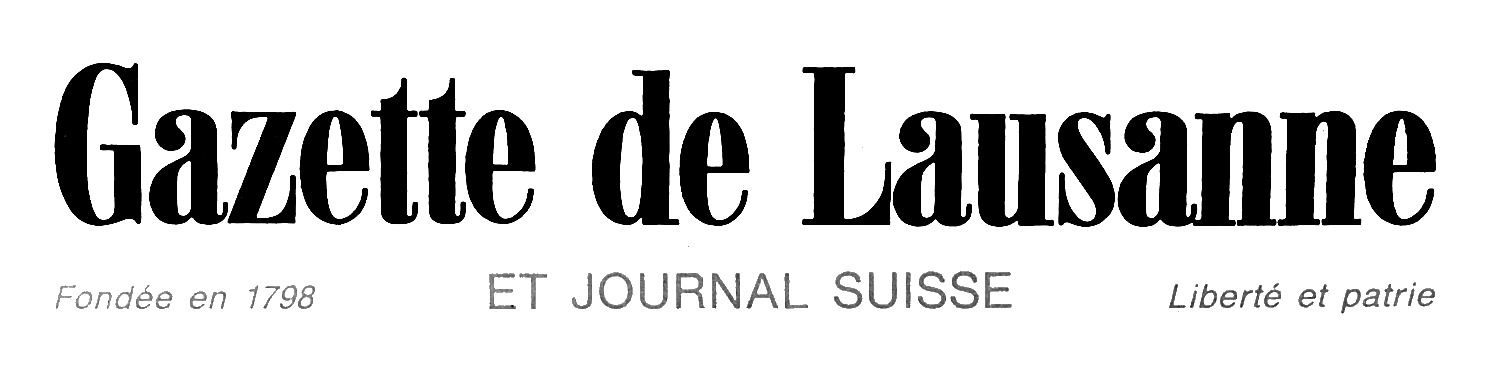

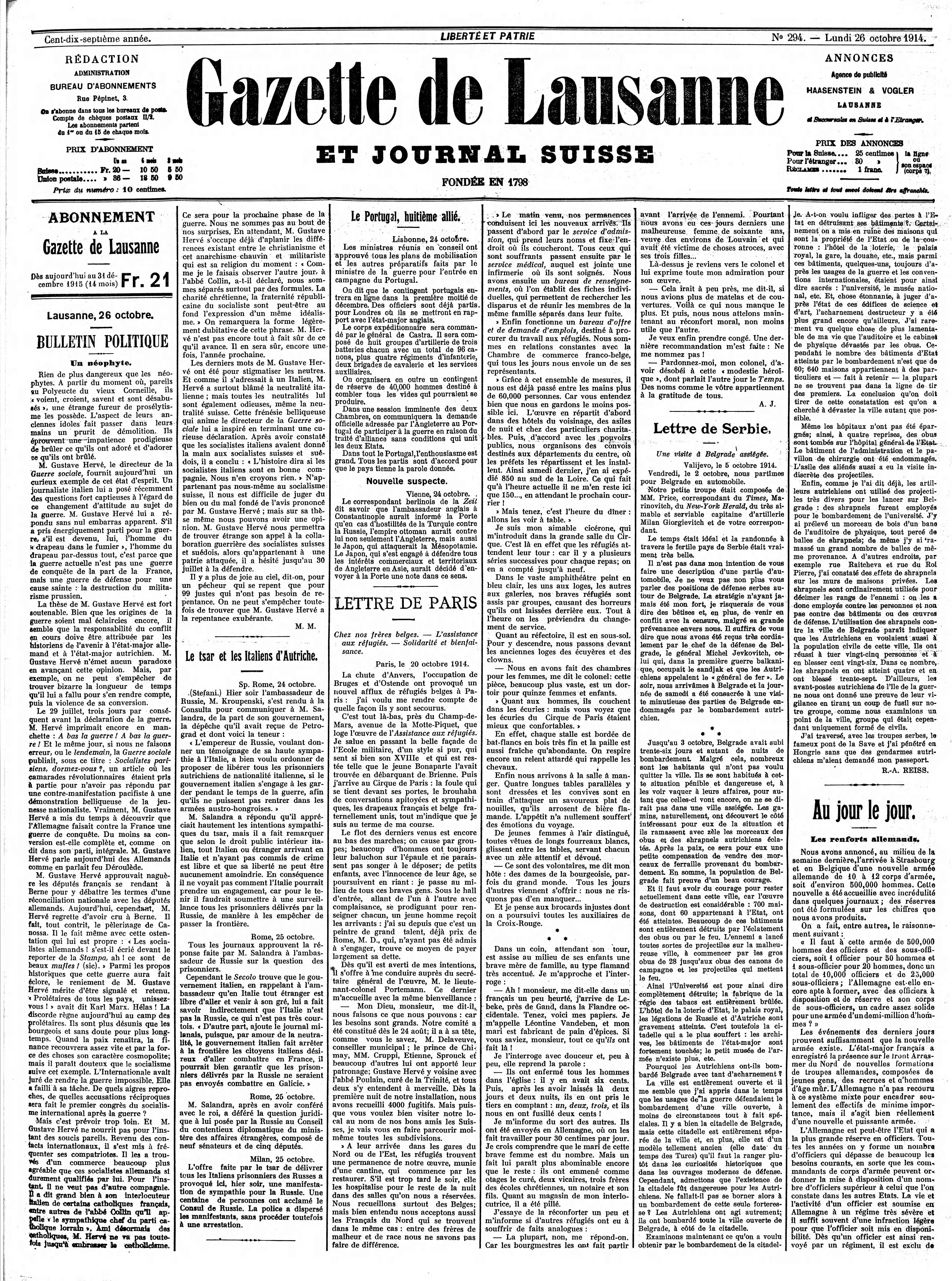
- Front page of the 26 October 1914 issue of the Gazette de Lausanne.
- Type: Daily newspaper
- Founder: Gabriel-Antoine Miéville
- Founded: 1798
- Ceased publication: 1991
- Language: French
- Headquarters: Lausanne
- Country: Switzerland
- ISSN: 1010-206X
- OCLC number: 5426309

The Gazette de Lausanne was a French-language Swiss daily newspaper. It was founded in 1798 by Gabriel-Antoine Miéville. Following a period of financial problems, it became editorially closer to and eventually merged into the Journal de Genève in 1991. Their combined paper merged a few years later with the Le Nouveau Quotidien to form Le Temps.

== History ==
The paper was founded as the Peuple vaudois in 1798 by Gabriel-Antoine Miéville, which changed its name in 1804 to the Gazette de Lausanne.

From 1804 to 55, the paper ran several times a week; following 1856 it became a daily newspaper. In the period of 1917 to 1926 it increased its printings to twice a day, which became three a day for a period, before returning to a daily in 1965. It included a supplementary paper run on Saturday, ran by Pierre Béguin and Franck Jotterand, the Gazette littéraire.

The paper encountered financial difficulties throughout the 1960s, and in the 70s began to increasingly collaborate with the Journal de Genève paper. It eventually merged into the Journal de Genève in 1991 to form the Journal de Genève et Gazette de Lausanne. This paper then merged in 1998 with the Le Nouveau Quotidien to form Le Temps.

The paper's digitized archives are available on the Le Temps Archives website.

== Organization ==
Important journalists that wrote for the paper included:

- Pierre Béguin
- Albert Bonnard
- Gaston Bridel
- Georges Duplain
- Franck Jotterand
- Edgar Junod
- Georges Rigassi
- Edmond Rossier
- Edouard Secretan
