= L'Hebdo =

Swiss news magazine

- Cover of the 5 October 1995 issue of L'Hebdo.
- Editor-in-chief: Alain Jeannet
- Categories: News magazine
- Frequency: Weekly
- Circulation: 38,040
- Publisher: Ringier
- First issue: 1981
- Final issue: 2 February 2017
- Company: Ringier
- Country: Switzerland
- Based in: Lausanne
- Language: French
- Website: www.hebdo.ch
- ISSN: 1013-0691
- OCLC: 9875350

L'Hebdo (French pronunciation: [lɛbdo], lit. 'The Weekly') was a weekly French language news magazine published in Lausanne, Switzerland. Founded in 1981, it focused on social, economic and cultural issues. It was published by Ringier. Due to unprofitability, it ceased publication, and its final issue was published 2 February 2017.

== History and profile ==
L'Hebdo was established in 1981. The magazine, based in Lausanne, is part of Ringier and is published by Ringier weekly on Wednesdays. The magazine, published in French, covered articles about social, economic and cultural issues. It was inspired by English news magazines. According to its publisher, it was the Romandy's only news magazine.

The fifth editor-in-chief was Alain Jeannet, starting in 2003, who had previously interned with the magazine. The marketing manager was Yvonne Braun. It had a joint editing team with the newspaper Le Temps, both owned by Ringier.

=== Closure ===
After both it and Le Temps experienced job cuts, as of the time of its closure both publications employed a joint editorial force of 112 people, 15 of whom ran the magazine. L'Hebdo ceased publication on 2 February 2017. At a readership of 155,000, it had become unprofitable; according to them closing L'Hebdo would benefit Le Temps due to financial savings, and they wished to "stabilize and secure" their most prominent publication. The magazine had been financially unsuccessful for 15 years, and in the four years prior to its closure it had lost half of its advertising revenue and a third of its circulation. This was part of a wider crisis in the Swiss press, in which news magazines were particularly affected.

The closure of the magazine provoked concern from several commentators, with worries that it damaged the press and democracy, as well as national cohesion in French-speaking Switzerland. The governments of Vaud and Lausanne, with the government of Vaud requesting a meeting with the publication management. The president of the Council of State of Geneva François Longchamp criticized the logic in shutting down L'Hebdo, saying that he struggled to understand "why closing L'Hebdo would strengthen Le Temps". Pascal Broulis and Pascal Couchepin also denounced the closure.

Following its closure, editor-in-chief Alain Jeannet expressed his disappointment and shock, stating that it "deserved to be given a chance and had real economic potential", and that his request for a management takeover had been overruled; the head of Ringier however stated that he had approached other publishers and none agreed. The editorial staff was also outraged by the closure. Several commentators expressed concern due to L'Hebdo's role in the development of French speaking Switzerland's identity; Longchamp said that the history of the publication was important to the history of Francophone Switzerland, particularly in the 1990s. Maurice Ropraz bemoaned "the loss of an intercantonal link, which allowed readers to better understand the French-speaking landscape". Guillaume Barazzone said that the magazine in recent years had lost some of what it had in the 80s and 90s by focusing less on politics.

Christophe Darbellay praised L'Hebdo for having "the courage to resist the rise of the far right". The Swiss nationalist right was pleased by its closure due to the paper's left-wing stances and support of European Union membership, though according to Le Temps it had become more moderate in the preceding years. The Swiss People's Party did not mourn the paper's closure; Yvan Perrin stated only that "From now on, the Socialist Party and the Nomes will have to pay for their propaganda". Oskar Freysinger was also unsympathetic, stating that "[w]hen the media distance themselves from the realities of the population, giving lessons instead of investigating and reporting facts, they commit collective suicide." Some politicians suggested that public aid be given to the press in the aftermath, though others criticized this proposal.

== Readership ==
In 1997 L'Hebdo had a circulation of 56,950 copies. Between July 2004 and June 2005 its circulation was 43,911 copies. It was 44,870 between July 2005 and June 2006 and 48,451 copies between July 2006 and June 2007. Its circulation became 44,979 copies between July 2007 and June 2008. The circulation of the weekly was 45,000 copies in 2008 and 46,000 copies in 2009. The magazine had a circulation of 38,040 copies and a readership of 181,000 in 2014.

== See also ==
- List of magazines in Switzerland
