= Edipresse =

Swiss company

- Founded: 1907
- Headquarters: Lausanne, Switzerland
- Key people: Pierre Lamunière, Chairman & CEO
- Products: magazine publishing, digital ventures, real estate
- Website: edipresse.com

Edipresse is a company headquartered in Switzerland. Its main activities are magazine publishing, real estate and digital ventures.

== History ==
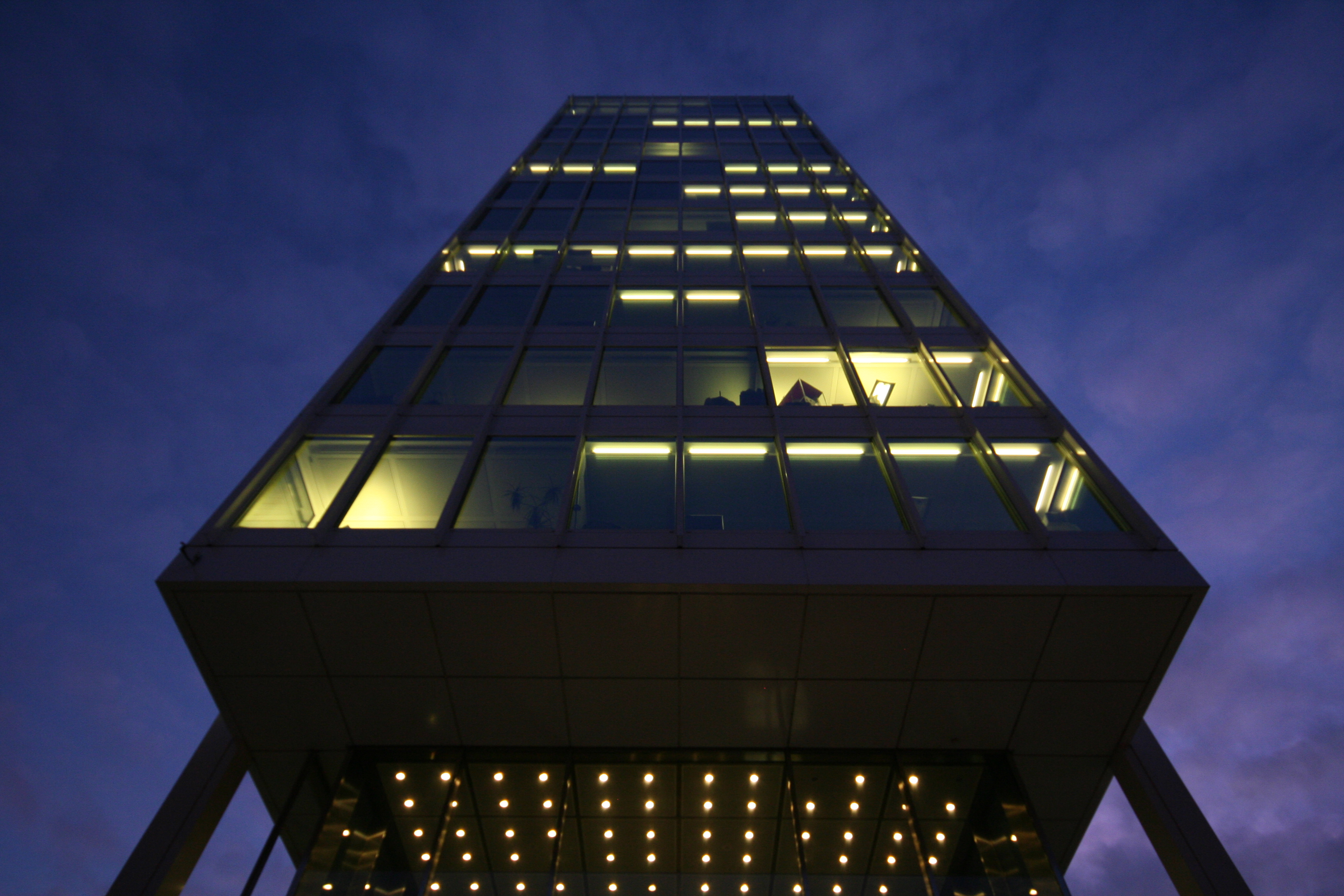
The Edipresse building in Lausanne

The company was founded in 1907 by Paul Allenspach, publisher of the newspaper La Feuille d'Avis de Lausanne. In 1937, the Lamunière and Payot families took joint control over the company. In 1982, Marc and Pierre Lamunière acquired majority control of the company, which became Edipresse SA.

In the 1980s, Edipresse's operations – newspaper and magazine publishing, printing – took place only in Switzerland. During the 1990s, the group expanded its activities internationally, mainly in Southern and Eastern Europe. In 2005, Edipresse entered several Asian markets. Tatler Asia (previously Edipresse Media Asia) publishes Tatler in Hong Kong, the Philippines, mainland China, Singapore, Taiwan, Malaysia, Indonesia, and Thailand. In September 2019, Edipresse Media Asia announced that it would be renamed Tatler Asia Group beginning January 2020.

In March 2009, Edipresse announced its Swiss operations would gradually be incorporated to those of the Tamedia Group, of which Edipresse became a shareholder. The merger was finalised in April 2012. Edipresse quit the Swiss stock exchange in 2011.

== See also ==
- Imprimeries Réunies
