= Municipalities of the canton of Vaud =

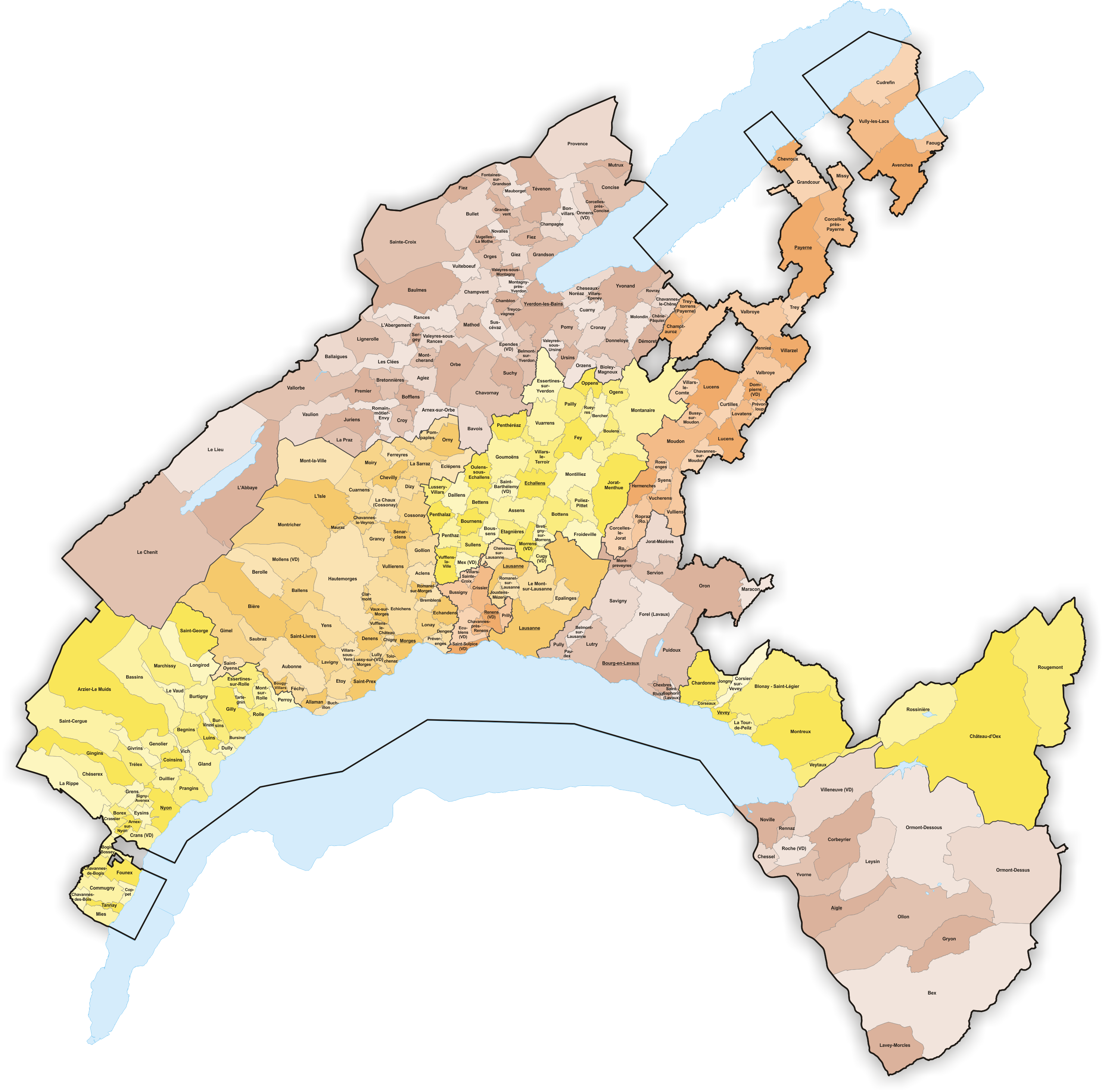
Municipalities in the canton of Vaud

There are 300 municipalities (French: communes) in the canton of Vaud, Switzerland (as of January 2022). Vaud is the canton with the second most municipalities (after Bern).

== List ==
- Aclens
- Agiez
- Aigle
- Allaman
- Arnex-sur-Nyon
- Arnex-sur-Orbe
- Arzier
- Assens
- Aubonne
- Avenches
- Ballaigues
- Ballens
- Bassins
- Baulmes
- Bavois
- Begnins
- Belmont-sur-Lausanne
- Belmont-sur-Yverdon
- Bercher
- Berolle
- Bettens
- Bex
- Bière
- Bioley-Magnoux
- Blonay - Saint-Légier
- Bofflens
- Bogis-Bossey
- Bonvillars
- Borex
- Bottens
- Bougy-Villars
- Boulens
- Bourg-en-Lavaux
- Bournens
- Boussens
- Bremblens
- Bretigny-sur-Morrens
- Bretonnières
- Buchillon
- Bullet
- Bursinel
- Bursins
- Burtigny
- Bussigny
- Bussy-sur-Moudon
- Chamblon
- Champagne
- Champtauroz
- Champvent
- Chardonne
- Château-d'Oex
- Chavannes-de-Bogis
- Chavannes-des-Bois
- Chavannes-le-Chêne
- Chavannes-le-Veyron
- Chavannes-près-Renens
- Chavannes-sur-Moudon
- Chavornay
- Chêne-Pâquier
- Cheseaux-Noréaz
- Cheseaux-sur-Lausanne
- Chéserex
- Chessel
- Chevilly
- Chevroux
- Chexbres
- Chigny
- Clarmont
- Coinsins
- Commugny
- Concise
- Coppet
- Corbeyrier
- Corcelles-le-Jorat
- Corcelles-près-Concise
- Corcelles-près-Payerne
- Corseaux
- Corsier-sur-Vevey
- Cossonay
- Crans-près-Céligny
- Crassier
- Crissier
- Cronay
- Croy
- Cuarnens
- Cuarny
- Cudrefin
- Cugy
- Curtilles
- Daillens
- Démoret
- Denens
- Denges
- Dizy
- Dompierre
- Donneloye
- Duillier
- Dully
- Echallens
- Echandens
- Echichens
- Eclépens
- Ecublens
- Epalinges
- Ependes
- Essertines-sur-Rolle
- Essertines-sur-Yverdon
- Etagnières
- Etoy
- Eysins
- Faoug
- Féchy
- Ferreyres
- Fey
- Fiez
- Fontaines-sur-Grandson
- Forel
- Founex
- Froideville
- Genolier
- Giez
- Gilly
- Gimel
- Gingins
- Givrins
- Gland
- Gollion
- Goumoëns
- Grancy
- Grandcour
- Grandevent
- Grandson
- Grens
- Gryon
- Hautemorges
- Henniez
- Hermenches
- Jongny
- Jorat-Menthue
- Jorat-Mézières
- Jouxtens-Mézery
- Juriens
- L'Abbaye
- L'Abergement
- L'Isle
- La Chaux
- La Praz
- La Rippe
- La Sarraz
- La Tour-de-Peilz
- Lausanne
- Lavey-Morcles
- Lavigny
- Le Chenit
- Le Lieu
- Le Mont-sur-Lausanne
- Le Vaud
- Les Clées
- Leysin
- Lignerolle
- Lonay
- Longirod
- Lovatens
- Lucens
- Luins
- Lully
- Lussery-Villars
- Lussy-sur-Morges
- Lutry
- Maracon
- Marchissy
- Mathod
- Mauborget
- Mauraz
- Mex
- Mies
- Missy
- Moiry
- Mollens
- Molondin
- Mont-la-Ville
- Mont-sur-Rolle
- Montagny-près-Yverdon
- Montanaire
- Montcherand
- Montilliez
- Montpreveyres
- Montreux
- Montricher
- Morges
- Morrens
- Moudon
- Mutrux
- Novalles
- Noville
- Nyon
- Ogens
- Ollon
- Onnens
- Oppens
- Orbe
- Orges
- Ormont-Dessous
- Ormont-Dessus
- Orny
- Oron
- Orzens
- Oulens-sous-Echallens
- Pailly
- Paudex
- Payerne
- Penthalaz
- Penthaz
- Penthéréaz
- Perroy
- Poliez-Pittet
- Pompaples
- Pomy
- Prangins
- Premier
- Préverenges
- Prévonloup
- Prilly
- Provence
- Puidoux
- Pully
- Rances
- Renens
- Rennaz
- Rivaz
- Roche
- Rolle
- Romainmôtier-Envy
- Romanel-sur-Lausanne
- Romanel-sur-Morges
- Ropraz
- Rossenges
- Rossinière
- Rougemont
- Rovray
- Rueyres
- Saint-Barthélemy
- Saint-Cergue
- Saint-George
- Saint-Livres
- Saint-Oyens
- Saint-Prex
- Saint-Saphorin
- Saint-Sulpice
- Sainte-Croix
- Saubraz
- Savigny
- Senarclens
- Sergey
- Servion
- Signy-Avenex
- Suchy
- Sullens
- Suscévaz
- Syens
- Tannay
- Tartegnin
- Tévenon
- Tolochenaz
- Trélex
- Trey
- Treycovagnes
- Treytorrens
- Ursins
- Valbroye
- Valeyres-sous-Montagny
- Valeyres-sous-Rances
- Valeyres-sous-Ursins
- Vallorbe
- Vaulion
- Vaux-sur-Morges
- Vevey
- Veytaux
- Vich
- Villars-Epeney
- Villars-le-Comte
- Villars-le-Terroir
- Villars-Sainte-Croix
- Villars-sous-Yens
- Villarzel
- Villeneuve
- Vinzel
- Vuarrens
- Vucherens
- Vufflens-la-Ville
- Vufflens-le-Château
- Vugelles-La Mothe
- Vuiteboeuf
- Vulliens
- Vullierens
- Vully-les-Lacs
- Yens
- Yverdon-les-Bains
- Yvonand
- Yvorne

== Mergers ==
- On 1 January 1961: the municipalities of Bussy-sur-Morges and Chardonney-sur-Morges merged to form Bussy-Chardonney
- In 1962: the municipalities Montreux-Châtelard and Montreux-Planches merged to form Montreux
- On 1 January 1970: the municipalities of Lavey and Morcles merged to form Lavey-Morcles
- On 1 January 1970: the municipalities of Romainmôtier and Envy merged to form Romainmôtier-Envy.
- On 1 January 1999: the municipalities of Lussery and Villars-Lussery merged to form Lussery-Villars.
- On 1 January 2002: the municipalities of Champmartin and Cudrefin merged under the name of Cudrefin.
- On 1 January 2003: the municipalities of La Rogivue and Maracon formed the municipality Maracon.
- On 1 January 2005: the municipalities of Arrissoules and Rovray formed the municipality Rovray.
- On 1 January 2006: the municipalities of Villarzel, Rossens and Sédeilles merged to form Villarzel.
- On 1 January 2006: the municipalities of Avenches and Donatyre merged to form Avenches.
- On 1 January 2008: the municipalities of Donneloye, Gossens and Mézery-près-Donneloye merged to form Donneloye
- On 1 January 2009: the municipalities of Assens and Malapalud merged to form Assens.
- On 1 July 2011: the municipalities of Aubonne and Pizy merged to form Aubonne
- the municipalities of Avenches and Oleyres merged to form Avenches
- the municipalities of Bellerive, Chabrey, Constantine, Montmagny, Mur, Vallamand and Villars-le-Grand merged to form Vully-les-Lacs
- the municipalities of Dommartin, Naz, Poliez-le-Grand and Sugnens merged to form Montilliez
- the municipalities of Éclagnens, Goumoens-la-Ville and Goumoens-le-Jux merged to form Goumoëns
- the municipalities of Montaubion-Chardonney, Peney-le-Jorat, Sottens, Villars-Mendraz and Villars-Tiercelin merged to form Jorat-Menthue
- the municipalities of Fontanezier, Romairon, Vaugondry and Villars-Burquin merged to form Tévenon
- the municipalities of Cully, Epesses, Grandvaux, Riex and Villette (Lavaux) merged to form Bourg-en-Lavaux
- the municipalities of Colombier, Echichens, Monnaz and Saint-Saphorin-sur-Morges merged to form Echichens
- the municipalities of Lucens and Oulens-sur-Lucens merged to form Lucens
- the municipalities of Cerniaz, Combremont-le-Grand, Combremont-le-Petit, Granges-près-Marnand, Marnand, Sassel, Seigneux and Villars-Bramard merged to form Valbroye
- the municipalities of Gressy and Yverdon-les-Bains merged to form Yverdon-les-Bains
- On 1 January 2012: the municipalities of Bussigny-sur-Oron, Châtillens, Chesalles-sur-Oron, Ecoteaux, Oron-la-Ville, Oron-le-Châtel, Palézieux, Les Tavernes, Les Thioleyres and Vuibroye merged to form Oron
- On 1 January 2013: the municipalities of Chapelle-sur-Moudon, Correvon, Denezy, Martherenges, Neyruz-sur-Moudon, Peyres-Possens, Saint-Cierges, Thierrens and Chanéaz merged to form Montanaire
- On 1 July 2016: the municipalities of Carrouge, Ferlens and Mézières merged to form Jorat-Mézières
- On 1 January 2017: the municipalities of Corcelles-sur-Chavornay and Essert-Pittet merged into Chavornay
- the municipalities of Brenles, Chesalles-sur-Moudon, Cremin, Forel-sur-Lucens and Sarzens merged into Lucens
- On 1 January 2021: the municipalities of Aubonne and Montherod merged into Aubonne
- On 1 July 2021: the municipalities of Apples, Cottens, Pampigny, Sévery, Bussy-Chardonney and Reverolle merged into Hautemorges
- the municipalities of Assens and Bioley-Orjulaz merged into Assens
- On 1 January 2022: the municipalities of Blonay and Saint-Légier-La Chiésaz merged into Blonay - Saint-Légier
- the municipalities of Essertes and Oron merged into Oron
