= Morges (river) =

Morges Morgia, Morgiaz
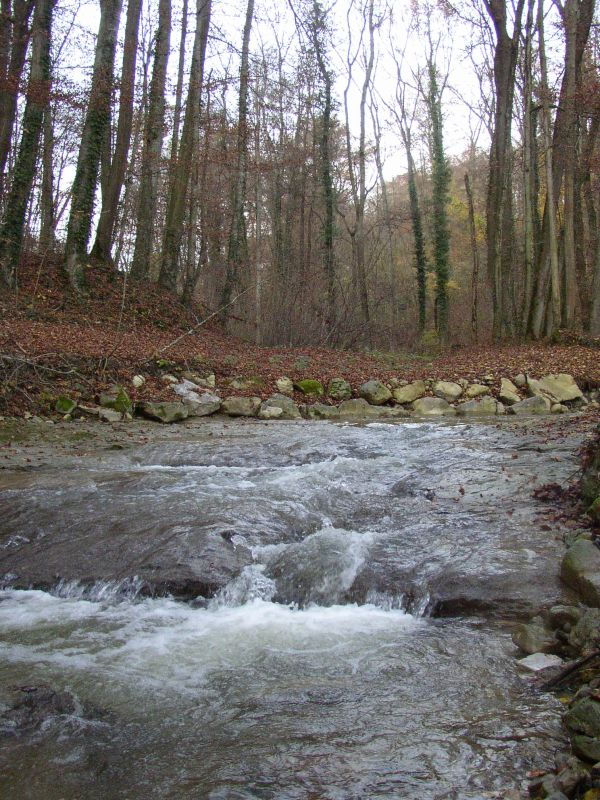
- The Morges riverside path in Chigny.

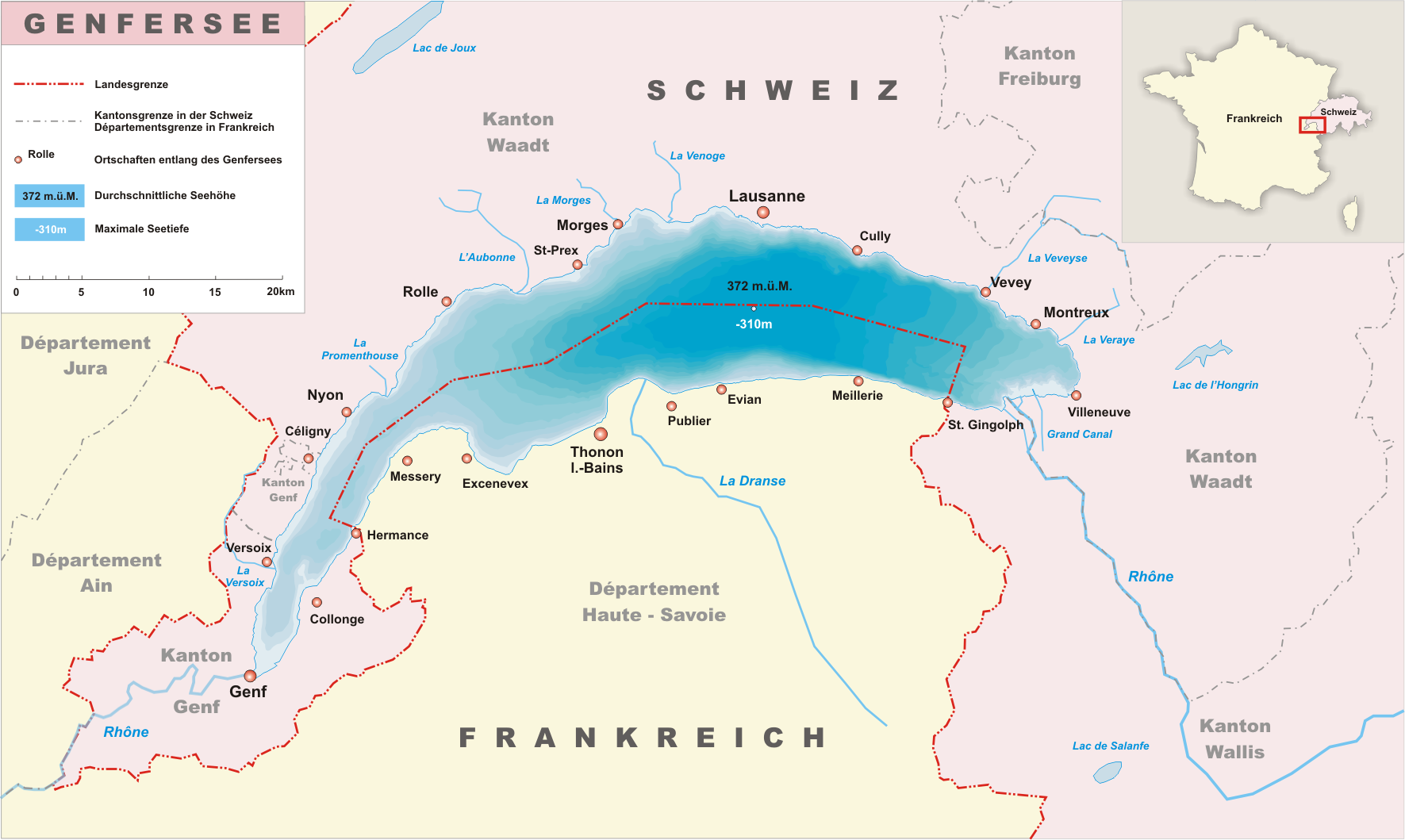

Location
- Country: Switzerland
- Region: Lake Geneva region

Physical characteristics
- Mouth: Rhône
  - location: Lake Geneva, west of Morges
  - elevation: 372 m
- Length: 14.86 km (9.23 mi)
- Basin size: 35.6 sq.km

Basin features
- River system: Rhône basin
- Cities: Morges
- Tributaries
  - left: Combagnou, Baillon
  - right: Grand Curbit

The Morges is a river in Switzerland, located in the canton of Vaud. It flows into the Rhône at Lake Geneva and passes through the town of Morges, which takes its name from the river. Its main tributaries are the Combagnou on the left bank, which joins it south of Pampigny, and the Grand Curbit on the right bank near Bussy and Vaux-sur-Morges.

== Etymology ==
The name Morges derives from the Franco-Provençal (Arpitan) terms Morgia or Morgyz. The word morgia is related to morga or marka, meaning a boundary or frontier in early Proto-Germanic. The river shares this origin with the Morge of Saint-Gingolph and the Morge of Conthey.

== Geography ==
=== Course ===
The Morges rises north of Apples in an area known as Le Marais. Along its course, the river alternates between underground channelled sections and open-air stretches. It follows the Apples–L'Isle railway line as far as the Le Manège station, then turns northeast. It re-emerges and receives the waters of the municipal wastewater treatment plant. The river then enters the municipality of Sévery from the south and exits to the east into Cottens, where it is joined by the Combagnou. It then makes a sharp turn southward and enters Échichens, flowing west of Colombier. Continuing south, it forms the municipal boundary with Clarmont. Along this boundary, a water intake divides the river channel as far as the Clarmont mill. The Morges then continues south, marking the boundary between Clarmont and Vaux-sur-Morges, before flowing entirely through Vaux-sur-Morges to the tripoint with Bussy-Chardonney and Vufflens-le-Château, where the Grand Curbit joins it. From there, the river turns southeast, forming the boundary between Vufflens-le-Château and Vaux-sur-Morges, then Monnaz (a locality of Échichens). At another tripoint between Vufflens-le-Château, Échichens, and Morges, it is joined by the Baillon. The river then flows south, forming the boundary between Chigny and Morges, before flowing entirely through Morges and emptying into Lake Geneva. Its total length is approximately 14.86 kilometres (9.23 mi).

== Fauna ==
Several fish ladders are installed along the Morges, notably at Vaux-sur-Morges. The river is known as a habitat for brown trout (Salmo trutta). In 2013, the Vaud cantonal fisheries authority recorded the capture of 190 individuals.

=== Hydrology ===
The drainage basin of the Morges covers 35.6 square kilometres (13.7 sq mi), and the river has a nival-pluvial flow regime. Near the ice rink in Morges, the average annual discharge in 2011 was 0.228 cubic metres per second (8.1 cu ft/s). Over the period 1995–2011, the average discharge was 0.434 cubic metres per second (15.3 cu ft/s). The highest recorded peak flow occurred on 15 November 2002, exceeding 23.6 cubic metres per second (830 cu ft/s), with an average daily discharge of 9.36 cubic metres per second (331 cu ft/s) on the same day. The lowest average daily discharge was recorded on 2 August 2004, at less than 0.017 cubic metres per second (0.60 cu ft/s).

== Bibliography ==
- Berger, Richard (1957). La contrée de Morges et ses monuments historiques (in French). Yens: Éditions Cabédita. ISBN 2-88295-035-7
- Carte nationale – Morges (in French). Wabern: Swisstopo. 2011. ISBN 978-3-302-01242-1.
- "Discharge of the Morges at Morges from 1995 to 2011" (pdf). vhv.ch (in French). 2011.
- "Annex to the decree relating to municipal coats of arms (AAC) of 10 February 1925 (175.12.1)" (PDF) (in French). p. 26.
- "Rivers of the canton of Vaud – Evolution of catches and restocking" (pdf) (in French). Directorate-General for the Environment, Fisheries Inspectorate. 12 November 2014. p. 7.
