= Hautemorges =

- Municipality
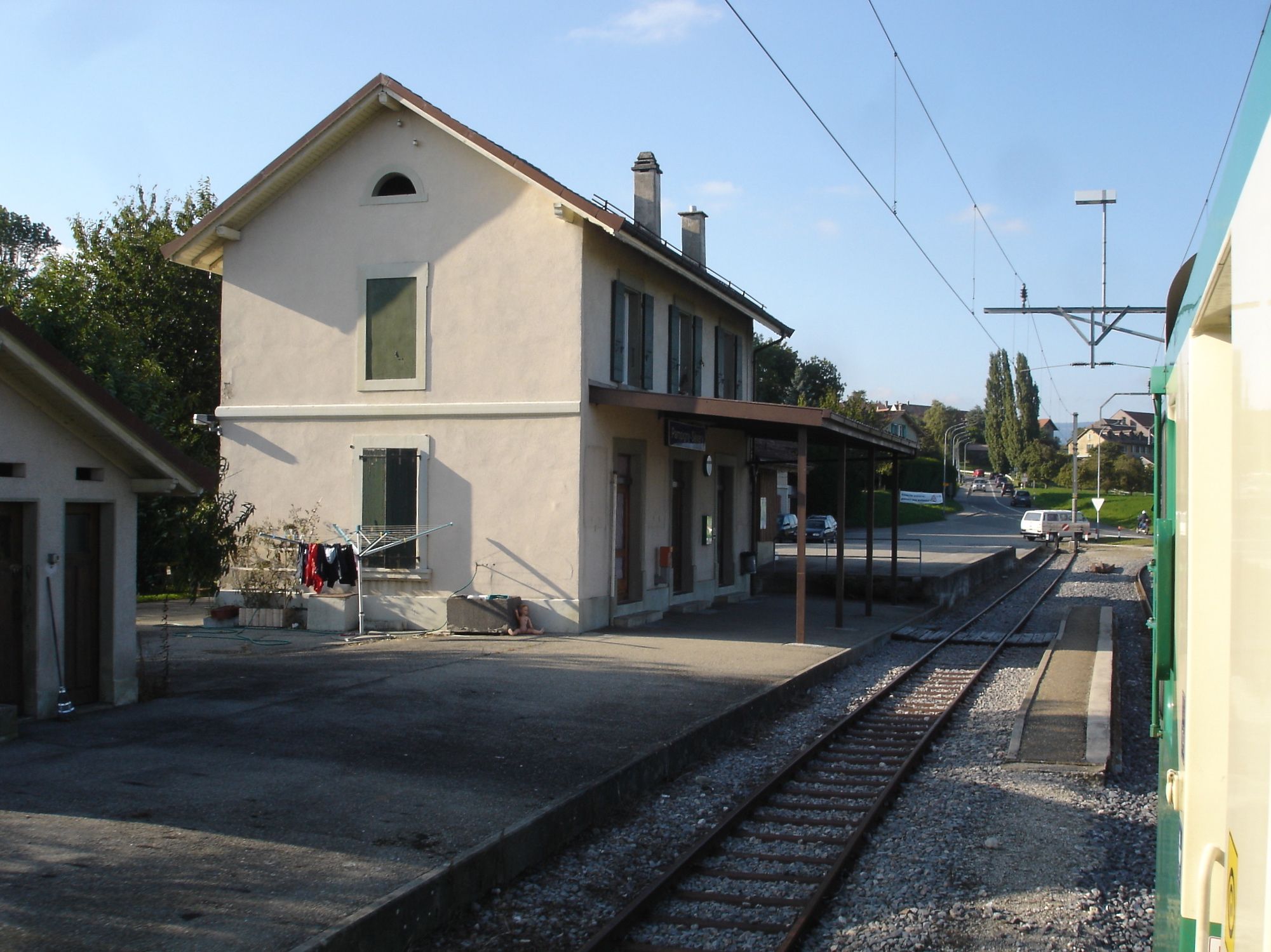
- The Pampigny-Sévery train station

- Flag Coat of arms
- Location of Hautemorges
- Location within Switzerland Location within Canton of Vaud
- Coordinates: 46°32′N 06°27′E
- Country: Switzerland
- Canton: Vaud
- District: Morges

Government
  - Mayor: Syndic

Area
  - Total: 32.95 km^{2} (12.72 sq mi)
- Elevation: 520 m (1,710 ft)

Population (2019)
  - Total: 4,071
  - Density: 123.6/km^{2} (320.0/sq mi)
- Time zone: UTC+01:00 (CET)
  - Summer (DST): UTC+02:00 (CEST)
- Postal code: 1136
- SFOS number: 5656
- ISO 3166 code: CH-VD
- Surrounded by: Denens, Vaux-sur-Morges, Vufflens-le-Château, Yens
- Website: https://www.hautemorges.ch/ Profile (in French), SFSO statistics

Hautemorges is a municipality in the Swiss canton of Vaud, located in the district of Morges.

On 1 July 2021 the former municipalities of Apples, Cottens, Pampigny, Sévery, Bussy-Chardonney and Reverolle merged into the new municipality of Hautemorges.

== History ==
=== Apples ===
Apples has a long history of settlements. Remains from the Neolithic, the Bronze Age, and the Romans have been found in the municipality. The first true settlement was founded by the Burgundians in the 5th century. It was most likely called Iplingen. Under the Romans this name probably was changed to Iplens and then Aplis. It was with this name that the village was first mentioned in a document, in 1011, when King Rudolf III presented the church and the village to the Romainmôtier Monastery as a gift. The spelling Aples appeared later (in 1222) and the current name came into use in 1328.

Aerial view of Apples (1949)

With the capture of Vaud by Bern in 1536, Apples became an exclave under the administration of the Romainmôtier district. After the collapse of the Ancien régime, the village became a part of the canton of Léman, from 1798 to 1803. It was subsequently absorbed by the canton of Vaud, and in 1798 it became a part of the Morges District.

=== Cottens ===
Cottens is first mentioned in 1041 as Chotens.

=== Pampigny ===
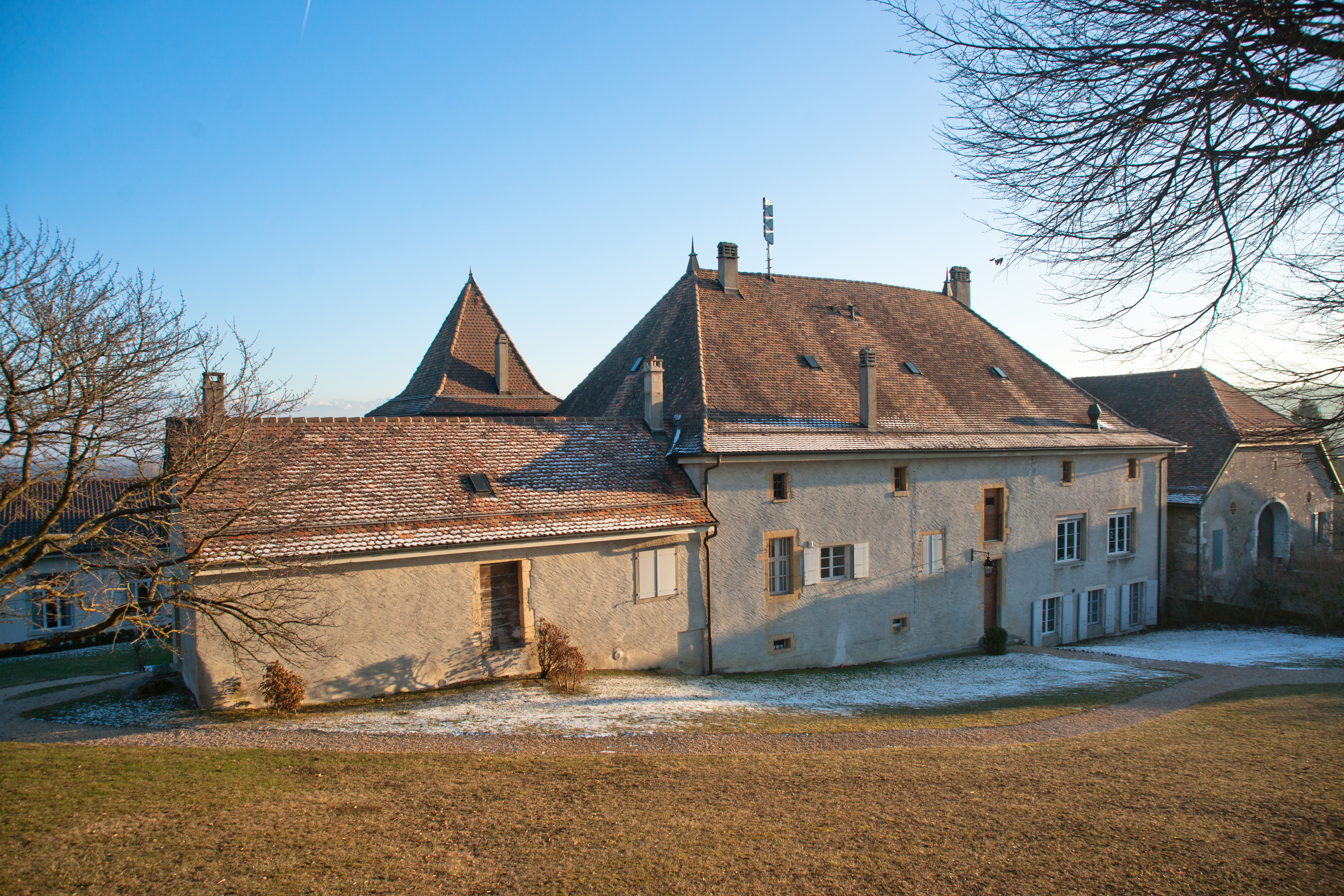
Pampigny Castle.

Pampigny is first mentioned in 1141 as Pampiniaco.

=== Sévery ===
Sévery is first mentioned in 979 as Siuiriaco. In 1453 it was mentioned as Syuiriez.

=== Bussy-Chardonney ===
The municipality was created in 1961 by a merger of Bussy-sur-Morges and Chardonney-sur-Morges. Bussy is first mentioned about 1059 as Bussi. Chardonney-sur-Morges was first mentioned in 1324 as Chardonne.

=== Reverolle ===
Reverolle is first mentioned in 1177 as Ruuilora.

== Geography ==
After the merger, Hautemorges has an area (as of the 2004/09 survey) of 32.95 km^{2} (12.72 sq mi).

== Demographics ==
The new municipality has a population (as of December 2020) of 4,071.

== Historic population ==
The historical population is given in the following chart:

== Sights ==
The entire village of Pampigny is designated as part of the Inventory of Swiss Heritage Sites.
