= Vufflens Castle =

Castle in Vufflens-le-Château, Switzerland

- Château de Vufflens

- Location within Canton of Vaud Vufflens Castle (Switzerland)

General information
- Location: Vufflens-le-Château, Switzerland
- Coordinates: 46°31′29″N 6°28′35″E
- Construction started: 1420
- Completed: 1430
- Client: Henri de Colombier

Swiss Cultural Property of National Significance

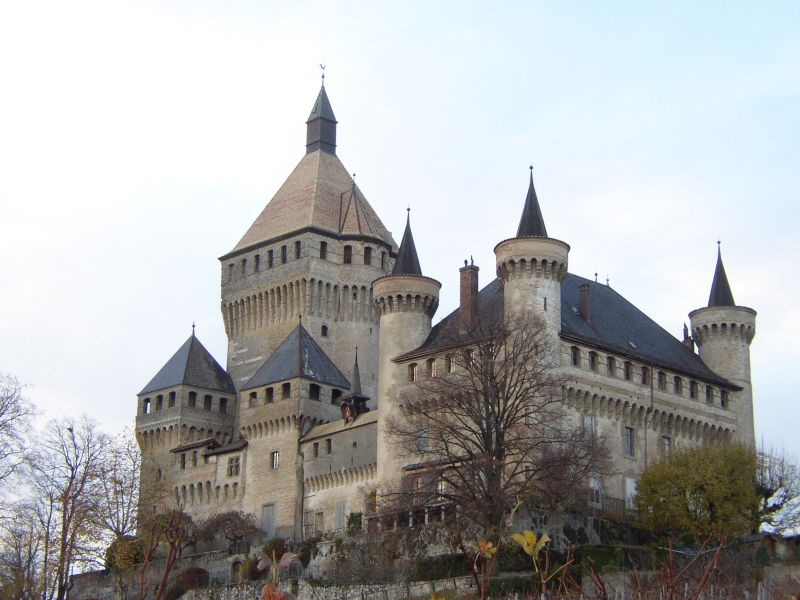
Chateau de Vufflens

Vufflens Castle (French: Château de Vufflens) is a medieval castle in the Swiss municipality of Vufflens-le-Château in the canton of Vaud. It is a Swiss heritage site of national significance.

== History ==
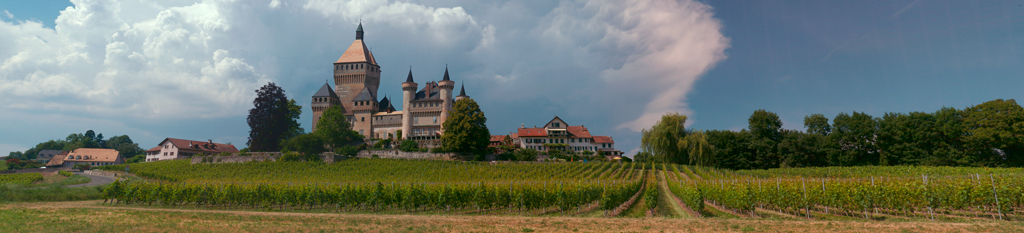
The castle and surroundings

The castle was built between 1420 and 1430 by Henri de Colombier, an advisor to Duke Amadeus VIII of Savoy, on the site of a previous medieval castle mentioned as early as 1108. In 1530, it was set on fire by Bernese troops. After the death of Philibert de Colombier in 1544, it passed through various owners, and in 1641 it was acquired by the de Senarclens family. The castle is privately owned.

== Castle site ==
From the previous castle of the lords of Vufflens, nothing remains. Of the original castle by Henri Colombier, the donjon, several towers, outbuildings, the surrounding wall and the gate house remain.

== In popular culture ==
Referenced in "The Four Towers of Vufflens"; a Swiss myth. In the myth the lord of the castle (Grimoald) punished his wife for giving birth to a daughter (when he wanted a son to inherit) by telling his wife he would kill the daughter. Rather than killing her he built a new tower on one corner of the castle & sent the daughter & a nurse to live in it. This occurred 3 more times; until, upon the birth of his 4th daughter he sent his wife and new daughter to live imprisoned in the fourth and final tower.

== See also ==
- List of castles in Switzerland
- Château
- Vufflens-le-Château
