= La Rogivue =

Commune in Vaud, Switzerland

Coordinates: 46°33′51″N 6°53′40″E

La Rogivue was an independent commune in Vaud, Switzerland until it was incorporated into the municipality of Maracon in 2003.
