= Chardonney-sur-Morges =

Village in the canton of Vaud, Switzerland

Coordinates: 46°31′57″N 6°26′16″E

Chardonney-sur-Morges is a village and former municipality in the district of Morges in the canton of Vaud, Switzerland.

It was first recorded in year 1324 as Chardonne.

The municipality had 58 inhabitants in 1798, which increased to 60 in 1860 and 66 in 1960.

In 1961 the municipality was merged with the neighboring municipality Bussy-sur-Morges to form a new and larger municipality Bussy-Chardonney. This union had formerly existed before 1744 and between 1799 and 1819.

The village is served by a station on the Bière–Apples–Morges railway.
