= Reverolle =

- Former municipality
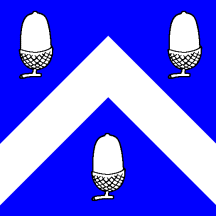
- Flag Coat of arms
- Location of Reverolle
- Location within Switzerland Location within Canton of Vaud
- Coordinates: 46°32′N 06°26′E
- Country: Switzerland
- Canton: Vaud
- District: Morges

Government
  - Mayor: Syndic; Aurel Matthey

Area
  - Total: 1.2 km^{2} (0.46 sq mi)
- Elevation: 585 m (1,919 ft)

Population (2020)
  - Total: 407
  - Density: 340/km^{2} (880/sq mi)
- Time zone: UTC+01:00 (CET)
  - Summer (DST): UTC+02:00 (CEST)
- Postal code: 1128
- SFOS number: 5644
- ISO 3166 code: CH-VD
- Surrounded by: Apples, Bussy-Chardonney, Clarmont, Vaux-sur-Morges
- Website: www.reverolle.ch

Reverolle is a former municipality in the Swiss canton of Vaud, located in the district of Morges. On 1 July 2021 the former municipalities of Apples, Cottens, Pampigny, Sévery, Bussy-Chardonney and Reverolle merged into the new municipality of Hautemorges.

== History ==
Reverolle is first mentioned in 1177 as Ruuilora.

== Geography ==
Reverolle has an area, as of 2009, of 1.2 square kilometers (0.46 mi^{2}). Of this area, 0.94 km^{2} (0.36 mi^{2}) or 79.7% is used for agricultural purposes, while 0.02 km^{2} (0.0077 mi^{2}) or 1.7% is forested. Of the rest of the land, 0.18 km^{2} (0.069 mi^{2}) or 15.3% is settled (buildings or roads).

Of the built up area, housing and buildings made up 10.2% and transportation infrastructure made up 5.1%. Out of the forested land, all of the forested land area is covered with heavy forests. Of the agricultural land, 67.8% is used for growing crops and 1.7% is pastures, while 10.2% is used for orchards or vine crops.

The municipality was part of the Morges District until it was dissolved on 31 August 2006, and Reverolle became part of the new district of Morges.

The municipality is located on a terrace between Lake Geneva and the Jura Mountains.

== Coat of arms ==
The blazon of the municipal coat of arms is Azure, a Chevron Argent between three Acorns, two and one of the same.

== Demographics ==
Reverolle has a population (as of December 2020) of 412. As of 2008, 10.9% of the population are resident foreign nationals. Over the last 10 years (1999–2009 ) the population has changed at a rate of 6.9%. It has changed at a rate of 0.3% due to migration and at a rate of 6% due to births and deaths.

Most of the population (as of 2000) speaks French (304 or 94.1%), with German being second most common (8 or 2.5%) and Portuguese being third (5 or 1.5%). There is 1 person who speaks Italian.

Of the population in the municipality 84 or about 26.0% were born in Reverolle and lived there in 2000. There were 148 or 45.8% who were born in the same canton, while 39 or 12.1% were born somewhere else in Switzerland, and 33 or 10.2% were born outside of Switzerland.

In 2008 there were 2 live births to Swiss citizens and were 2 deaths of Swiss citizens. Ignoring immigration and emigration, the population of Swiss citizens remained the same while the foreign population remained the same. At the same time, there were 3 non-Swiss women who immigrated from another country to Switzerland. The total Swiss population change in 2008 (from all sources, including moves across municipal borders) was an increase of 9 and the non-Swiss population decreased by 5 people. This represents a population growth rate of 1.2%.

The age distribution, as of 2009, in Reverolle is; 48 children or 13.5% of the population are between 0 and 9 years old and 61 teenagers or 17.1% are between 10 and 19. Of the adult population, 45 people or 12.6% of the population are between 20 and 29 years old. 52 people or 14.6% are between 30 and 39, 65 people or 18.3% are between 40 and 49, and 44 people or 12.4% are between 50 and 59. The senior population distribution is 30 people or 8.4% of the population are between 60 and 69 years old, 7 people or 2.0% are between 70 and 79, there are 4 people or 1.1% who are between 80 and 89.

As of 2000, there were 148 people who were single and never married in the municipality. There were 151 married individuals, 7 widows or widowers and 17 individuals who are divorced.

As of 2000, there were 120 private households in the municipality, and an average of 2.6 persons per household. There were 28 households that consist of only one person and 9 households with five or more people. Out of a total of 126 households that answered this question, 22.2% were households made up of just one person. Of the rest of the households, there are 25 married couples without children, 50 married couples with children There were 13 single parents with a child or children. There were 4 households that were made up of unrelated people and 6 households that were made up of some sort of institution or another collective housing.

In 2000 there were 42 single family homes (or 53.8% of the total) out of a total of 78 inhabited buildings. There were 11 multi-family buildings (14.1%), along with 19 multi-purpose buildings that were mostly used for housing (24.4%) and 6 other use buildings (commercial or industrial) that also had some housing (7.7%). Of the single family homes 11 were built before 1919, while 4 were built between 1990 and 2000. The greatest number of single family homes (18) were built between 1981 and 1990. The most multi-family homes (6) were built before 1919 and the next most (2) were built between 1981 and 1990.

In 2000 there were 118 apartments in the municipality. The most common apartment size was 4 rooms of which there were 35. There were 4 single room apartments and 49 apartments with five or more rooms. Of these apartments, a total of 107 apartments (90.7% of the total) were permanently occupied, while 8 apartments (6.8%) were seasonally occupied and 3 apartments (2.5%) were empty. As of 2009, the construction rate of new housing units was 2.8 new units per 1000 residents. The vacancy rate for the municipality, in 2010, was 0%.

The historical population is given in the following chart:

== Politics ==
In the 2007 federal election the most popular party was the SP which received 22.78% of the vote. The next three most popular parties were the FDP (20.26%), the SVP (19.26%) and the Green Party (13.99%). In the federal election, a total of 99 votes were cast, and the voter turnout was 46.5%.

== Economy ==
As of 2010, Reverolle had an unemployment rate of 1.1%. As of 2008, there were 17 people employed in the primary economic sector and about 9 businesses involved in this sector. 2 people were employed in the secondary sector and there were 2 businesses in this sector. 30 people were employed in the tertiary sector, with 11 businesses in this sector. There were 181 residents of the municipality who were employed in some capacity, of which females made up 47.0% of the workforce.

In 2008 the total number of full-time equivalent jobs was 37. The number of jobs in the primary sector was 10, all of which were in agriculture. The number of jobs in the secondary sector was 2, all of which were in manufacturing. The number of jobs in the tertiary sector was 25. In the tertiary sector; 13 or 52.0% were in wholesale or retail sales or the repair of motor vehicles, 1 was in the information industry, 1 was a technical professional or scientist, 8 or 32.0% were in education.

In 2000, there were 23 workers who commuted into the municipality and 138 workers who commuted away. The municipality is a net exporter of workers, with about 6.0 workers leaving the municipality for every one entering. Of the working population, 14.4% used public transportation to get to work, and 68.5% used a private car.

The municipality is served by a station on the Bière–Apples–Morges railway.

== Religion ==
From the 2000 census, 53 or 16.4% were Roman Catholic, while 186 or 57.6% belonged to the Swiss Reformed Church. Of the rest of the population, there were 12 individuals (or about 3.72% of the population) who belonged to another Christian church. There were 1 individual who belonged to another church. 56 (or about 17.34% of the population) belonged to no church, are agnostic or atheist, and 21 individuals (or about 6.50% of the population) did not answer the question.

== Education ==
In Reverolle about 121 or (37.5%) of the population have completed non-mandatory upper secondary education, and 55 or (17.0%) have completed additional higher education (either university or a Fachhochschule). Of the 55 who completed tertiary schooling, 60.0% were Swiss men, 36.4% were Swiss women.

In the 2009/2010 school year there were a total of 65 students in the Reverolle school district. In the Vaud cantonal school system, two years of non-obligatory pre-school are provided by the political districts. During the school year, the political district provided pre-school care for a total of 631 children of which 203 children (32.2%) received subsidized pre-school care. The canton's primary school program requires students to attend for four years. There were 33 students in the municipal primary school program. The obligatory lower secondary school program lasts for six years and there were 29 students in those schools. There were also 3 students who were home schooled or attended another non-traditional school.

As of 2000, there were 52 students in Reverolle who came from another municipality, while 42 residents attended schools outside the municipality.
