= Apples, Vaud =

Apples
- Former municipality
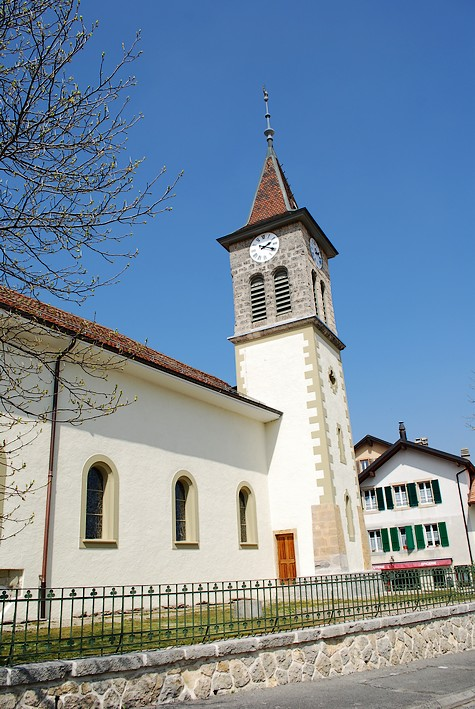
- Church in Apples village

- Flag Coat of arms
- Location of Apples
- Location within Switzerland Location within Canton of Vaud
- Coordinates: 46°33′N 06°26′E
- Country: Switzerland
- Canton: Vaud
- District: Morges

Government
  - Mayor: Syndic; Claude-Alain Roulet

Area
  - Total: 12.93 km^{2} (4.99 sq mi)
- Elevation: 635 m (2,083 ft)

Population (2004)
  - Total: 1,142
  - Density: 88.32/km^{2} (228.8/sq mi)
- Demonym(s): Les Caque à part Lè Caca-pai
- Time zone: UTC+01:00 (CET)
  - Summer (DST): UTC+02:00 (CEST)
- Postal code: 1143
- SFOS number: 5421
- ISO 3166 code: CH-VD
- Surrounded by: Pampigny, Sévery, Colombier, Clarmont, Reverolle, Bussy-Chardonney, Yens, Ballens, Mollens
- Website: www.apples.ch

Apples (French pronunciation: [apl]) is a former municipality in the district of Morges in the canton of Vaud, Switzerland. On 1 July 2021 the former municipalities of Apples, Cottens, Pampigny, Sévery, Bussy-Chardonney and Reverolle merged into the new municipality of Hautemorges.

== History ==
Apples has a long history of settlements. Remains from the Neolithic, the Bronze Age, and the Romans have been found in the municipality. The first true settlement was founded by the Burgundians in the 5th century. It was most likely called Iplingen. Under the Romans this name probably was changed to Iplens and then Aplis. It was with this name that the village was first mentioned in a document, in 1011, when King Rudolf III presented the church and the village to the Romainmôtier Monastery as a gift. The spelling Aples appeared later (in 1222) and the current name came into use in 1328.

Aerial view (1949)

With the capture of Vaud by Bern in 1536, Apples became an exclave under the administration of the Romainmôtier district. After the collapse of the Ancien régime, the village became a part of the canton of Léman, from 1798 to 1803. It was subsequently absorbed by the canton of Vaud, and in 1798 it became a part of the Morges District.

In 1803 Apples was moved to the district of Aubonne. In 2006 Apples was moved back into Morges

== Geography ==
Apples is located at 630 m (2,070 ft) above mean sea level (ASML), 7 km (4.3 mi) northwest of the city of Morges. The scattered villages of Apples span a knoll on the edge of a plateau, located at the foot of the Jura Mountains. This is in Swiss Plateau, an area full of impressive views looking out over the Morges River valley.

The municipality contains a section in its eastern edge of the French Plateau. The eastern part of the municipality is located in the drainage basin of the Morges Creek and the Le Curbit creek. In the western section of the municipality, which is larger by far, there is a glacial landscape of molasse hills with extensive woods and moor-like depressions. Several forests are a part of this western section: Les Bougeries (up to 704 m (2,310 ft) AMSL in the southwest), Bois de Saint-Pierre (up to 684 m (2,244 ft) AMSL in the north), and Bois de Savoye and Bois de Fermens in the northwest. The highest point in Apples is in the forest La Chaux-Derrière at a height of 708 m (2,323 ft) AMSL. On its western border, the municipality reaches the edge of a former river valley, Grand Marais, which once served as a channel for glacial melt waters from the Rhône Glacier. This valley is drained by the Veyron River to the northeast.

Two new isolated developments, En Lèvremont (600 m (2,000 ft) AMSL) and La Motte (615 m (2,018 ft) AMSL), are also a part of Apples. They are located on the gentle slopes of the Morges Valley. The municipalities that border Apples are Ballens, Mollens, Pampigny, Sévery, Colombier, Clarmont, Reverolle, Bussy-Chardonney und Yens.

Apples has an area, as of 2009, of 12.93 square kilometers (4.99 sq mi). Of this area, 5.97 km^{2} (2.31 sq mi) or 46.2% is used for agricultural purposes, while 6.18 km^{2} (2.39 sq mi) or 47.8% is forested. Of the rest of the land, 0.82 km^{2} (0.32 sq mi) or 6.3% is settled (buildings or roads).

Of the built up area, housing and buildings made up 2.7% and transportation infrastructure made up 2.9%. Out of the forested land, all of the forested land area is covered with heavy forests. Of the agricultural land, 43.5% is used for growing crops and 2.3% is pastures.

The municipality was part of the Aubonne District until it was dissolved on 31 August 2006, and Apples became part of the new district of Morges.

== Coat of arms ==
The blazon of the municipal coat of arms is Per pale Argent and Gules, overall a bend Or with three torteaus (= roundels Gules).

== Demographics ==
Apples has a population (as of December 2020) of 1,453. As of 2008, 13.9% of the population are resident foreign nationals. Over the last 10 years (1999–2009 ) the population has changed at a rate of 7.7%. It has changed at a rate of 8.5% due to migration and at a rate of -0.9% due to births and deaths.

Most of the population (as of 2000) speaks French (999 or 86.2%), with German being second most common (84 or 7.2%) and Portuguese being third (22 or 1.9%). There are 17 people who speak Italian.

Of the population in the municipality 279 or about 24.1% were born in Apples and lived there in 2000. There were 432 or 37.3% who were born in the same canton, while 232 or 20.0% were born somewhere else in Switzerland, and 192 or 16.6% were born outside of Switzerland.

In 2008 there were 13 live births to Swiss citizens and 1 birth to non-Swiss citizens, and in same time span there were 16 deaths of Swiss citizens. Ignoring immigration and emigration, the population of Swiss citizens decreased by 3 while the foreign population increased by 1. There were 3 Swiss men and 3 Swiss women who immigrated back to Switzerland. At the same time, there were 3 non-Swiss men and 2 non-Swiss women who immigrated from another country to Switzerland. The total Swiss population change in 2008 (from all sources, including moves across municipal borders) was an increase of 4 and the non-Swiss population increased by 6 people. This represents a population growth rate of 0.8%.

The age distribution, as of 2009, in Apples is; 165 children or 13.2% of the population are between 0 and 9 years old and 154 teenagers or 12.3% are between 10 and 19. Of the adult population, 120 people or 9.6% of the population are between 20 and 29 years old. 169 people or 13.6% are between 30 and 39, 191 people or 15.3% are between 40 and 49, and 158 people or 12.7% are between 50 and 59. The senior population distribution is 168 people or 13.5% of the population are between 60 and 69 years old, 72 people or 5.8% are between 70 and 79, there are 40 people or 3.2% who are between 80 and 89, and there are 10 people or 0.8% who are 90 and older.

As of 2000, there were 483 people who were single and never married in the municipality. There were 546 married individuals, 70 widows or widowers and 60 individuals who are divorced.

As of 2000, there were 417 private households in the municipality, and an average of 2.6 persons per household. There were 92 households that consist of only one person and 43 households with five or more people. Out of a total of 430 households that answered this question, 21.4% were households made up of just one person and there were 3 adults who lived with their parents. Of the rest of the households, there are 128 married couples without children, 164 married couples with children There were 22 single parents with a child or children. There were 8 households that were made up of unrelated people and 13 households that were made up of some sort of institution or another collective housing.

In 2000 there were 185 single family homes (or 63.4% of the total) out of a total of 292 inhabited buildings. There were 46 multi-family buildings (15.8%), along with 44 multi-purpose buildings that were mostly used for housing (15.1%) and 17 other use buildings (commercial or industrial) that also had some housing (5.8%). Of the single family homes 34 were built before 1919, while 17 were built between 1990 and 2000. The greatest number of single family homes (57) were built between 1971 and 1980. The most multi-family homes (17) were built before 1919 and the next most (11) were built between 1981 and 1990.

In 2000 there were 485 apartments in the municipality. The most common apartment size was 3 rooms of which there were 110. There were 17 single room apartments and 200 apartments with five or more rooms. Of these apartments, a total of 410 apartments (84.5% of the total) were permanently occupied, while 70 apartments (14.4%) were seasonally occupied and 5 apartments (1.0%) were empty. As of 2009, the construction rate of new housing units was 1.6 new units per 1000 residents. The vacancy rate for the municipality, in 2010, was 1.32%.

The historical population is given in the following chart:

== Politics ==
In the 2007 federal election the most popular party was the SVP which received 21.81% of the vote. The next three most popular parties were the SP (19.71%), the Green Party (15.3%) and the LPS Party (12.69%). In the federal election, a total of 393 votes were cast, and the voter turnout was 48.5%.

== Economy ==
Up until the 20th century, Apples was primarily an agricultural village. Today agriculture is only a secondary source of income for the residents of Apples. They focus on cultivation and animal husbandry with respect to dairy farming. North of the village there is a small industrial area, where, among other things, switchgear and high grade steel are manufactured. More jobs also exist in the services sector.

Notably, Logitech, a multinational manufacturer of computer peripherals and software, was founded in 1981 in Apples. The legal seat of Logitech International S.A. is still in Apples.

In Apples there is a riding school, a sports center, and an educational center, as well as a regional nursing home and foster home. In the last few decades the village has developed into a residential area thanks to its attractive location. Many of the employed residents are commuters, who work primarily in the cities of Morges and Lausanne.

As of 2010, Apples had an unemployment rate of 3.2%. As of 2008, there were 70 people employed in the primary economic sector and about 19 businesses involved in this sector. 312 people were employed in the secondary sector and there were 10 businesses in this sector. 226 people were employed in the tertiary sector, with 35 businesses in this sector. There were 570 residents of the municipality who were employed in some capacity, of which females made up 40.7% of the workforce.

In 2008 the total number of full-time equivalent jobs was 512. The number of jobs in the primary sector was 49, all of which were in agriculture. The number of jobs in the secondary sector was 300 of which 284 or (94.7%) were in manufacturing and 16 (5.3%) were in construction. The number of jobs in the tertiary sector was 163. In the tertiary sector; 17 or 10.4% were in wholesale or retail sales or the repair of motor vehicles, 5 or 3.1% were in the movement and storage of goods, 16 or 9.8% were in a hotel or restaurant, 9 or 5.5% were in the information industry, 7 or 4.3% were the insurance or financial industry, 14 or 8.6% were technical professionals or scientists, 37 or 22.7% were in education and 43 or 26.4% were in health care.

In 2000, there were 448 workers who commuted into the municipality and 388 workers who commuted away. The municipality is a net importer of workers, with about 1.2 workers entering the municipality for every one leaving. About 2.2% of the workforce coming into Apples are coming from outside Switzerland. Of the working population, 9.5% used public transportation to get to work, and 66.8% used a private car.

== Religion ==
From the 2000 census, 240 or 20.7% were Roman Catholic, while 648 or 55.9% belonged to the Swiss Reformed Church. Of the rest of the population, there were 10 members of an Orthodox church (or about 0.86% of the population), there were 4 individuals (or about 0.35% of the population) who belonged to the Christian Catholic Church, and there were 32 individuals (or about 2.76% of the population) who belonged to another Christian church. There were 2 individuals (or about 0.17% of the population) who were Jewish, and 13 (or about 1.12% of the population) who were Islamic. 178 (or about 15.36% of the population) belonged to no church, are agnostic or atheist, and 32 individuals (or about 2.76% of the population) did not answer the question.

== Education ==
In Apples about 425 or (36.7%) of the population have completed non-mandatory upper secondary education, and 223 or (19.2%) have completed additional higher education (either university or a Fachhochschule). Of the 223 who completed tertiary schooling, 52.9% were Swiss men, 31.8% were Swiss women, 8.1% were non-Swiss men and 7.2% were non-Swiss women.

In the 2009/2010 school year there were a total of 166 students in the Apples school district. In the Vaud cantonal school system, two years of non-obligatory pre-school are provided by the political districts. During the school year, the political district provided pre-school care for a total of 631 children of which 203 children (32.2%) received subsidized pre-school care. The canton's primary school program requires students to attend for four years. There were 109 students in the municipal primary school program. The obligatory lower secondary school program lasts for six years and there were 55 students in those schools. There were also 2 students who were home schooled or attended another non-traditional school.

As of 2000, there were 195 students in Apples who came from another municipality, while 157 residents attended schools outside the municipality.

== Transportation ==
The municipality is well located in terms of transportation. It is situated on the main road, which runs between Morges and Bière. The narrow gauge Chemin de fer Bière-Apples-Morges began running on July 1, 1895, with a station in Apples. The branch section from Apples to L'Isle was inaugurated on September 12, 1896. There is also a postal service route on the road between Morges and Apples.

== Attractions ==
The medieval church in Apples stands on the foundations of a Romanesque building. It was renovated in 1838 and 1905.
