= Morges District =

District in the canton of Vaud, Switzerland

Coordinates: 46°30′N 6°30′E

Morges District District de Morges
- District
- Country: Switzerland
- Canton: Vaud
- Capital: Morges

Area
  - Total: 372.99 km^{2} (144.01 sq mi)

Population (2020)
  - Total: 84,533
  - Density: 226.64/km^{2} (586.98/sq mi)
- Time zone: UTC+1 (CET)
  - Summer (DST): UTC+2 (CEST)
- Municipalities: 56

Morges District (French: District de Morges) is a district in the canton of Vaud in Switzerland. The seat of the district is the city of Morges.

== Geography ==
Morges has an area, as of 2009, of 372.99 square kilometers (144.01 sq mi). Of this area, 205.69 km^{2} (79.42 sq mi) or 55.1% is used for agricultural purposes, while 126.4 km^{2} (48.8 sq mi) or 33.9% is forested. Of the rest of the land, 38.25 km^{2} (14.77 sq mi) or 10.3% is settled (buildings or roads) and 2.66 km^{2} (1.03 sq mi) or 0.7% is unproductive land.

== Demographics ==
Morges has a population (as of December 2020) of 84,533.

Most of the population (as of 2000) speaks French (56,847 or 82.3%), with German being second most common (3,224 or 4.7%) and Italian being third (2,589 or 3.7%). There are 22 people who speak Romansh.

Of the population in the district 12,738 or about 18.4% were born in Morges and lived there in 2000. There were 23,191 or 33.6% who were born in the same canton, while 11,880 or 17.2% were born somewhere else in Switzerland, and 19,384 or 28.1% were born outside of Switzerland.

In 2008 there were 592 live births to Swiss citizens and 198 births to non-Swiss citizens, and in same time span there were 484 deaths of Swiss citizens and 55 non-Swiss citizen deaths. Ignoring immigration and emigration, the population of Swiss citizens increased by 108 while the foreign population increased by 143. There were 37 Swiss men and 27 Swiss women who emigrated from Switzerland. At the same time, there were 585 non-Swiss men and 629 non-Swiss women who immigrated from another country to Switzerland. The total Swiss population change in 2008 (from all sources, including moves across municipal borders) was an increase of 417 and the non-Swiss population increased by 1055 people. This represents a population growth rate of 2.1%.

The age distribution, as of 2009, in Morges is; 8,300 children or 11.5% of the population are between 0 and 9 years old and 9,051 teenagers or 12.5% are between 10 and 19. Of the adult population, 8,180 people or 11.3% of the population are between 20 and 29 years old. 10,572 people or 14.6% are between 30 and 39, 11,911 people or 16.5% are between 40 and 49, and 9,153 people or 12.7% are between 50 and 59. The senior population distribution is 7,634 people or 10.6% of the population are between 60 and 69 years old, 4,411 people or 6.1% are between 70 and 79, there are 2,489 people or 3.4% who are 80 and 89, and there are 531 people or 0.7% who are 90 and older.

As of 2000, there were 28,815 people who were single and never married in the district. There were 32,925 married individuals, 3,126 widows or widowers and 4,211 individuals who are divorced.

There were 9,904 households that consist of only one person and 1,599 households with five or more people. Out of a total of 29,876 households that answered this question, 33.2% were households made up of just one person and there were 117 adults who lived with their parents. Of the rest of the households, there are 7,893 married couples without children, 9,114 married couples with children There were 1,660 single parents with a child or children. There were 563 households that were made up of unrelated people and 625 households that were made up of some sort of institution or another collective housing.

The historical population is given in the following chart:

== Mergers and name changes ==
On 1 September 2006, the former Aubonne district (District d'Aubonne), Cossonay district (District de Cossonay), and Morges district (District de Morges) were dissolved and merged into the new Morges district.

- The municipalities of Apples, Aubonne, Ballens, Berolle, Bière, Bougy-Villars, Féchy, Gimel, Mollens (VD), Montherod, Pizy, Saint-Livres, Saint-Oyens, and Saubraz came from the Aubonne district (District d'Aubonne).
- The municipalities of La Chaux (Cossonay), Chavannes-le-Veyron, Chevilly, Cossonay, Cottens (VD), Cuarnens, Dizy, Eclépens, Ferreyres, Gollion, Grancy, L'Isle, Mauraz, Moiry, Mont-la-Ville, Montricher, Orny, Pampigny, Pompaples, La Sarraz, Senarclens, and Sévery came from the Cossonay district (District de Cossonay).
- The municipalities of Aclens, Bremblens, Buchillon, Bussy-Chardonney, Chigny, Clarmont, Colombier (VD), Denens, Denges, Echandens, Echichens, Etoy, Lavigny, Lonay, Lully (VD), Lussy-sur-Morges, Monnaz, Morges, Préverenges, Reverolle, Romanel-sur-Morges, Saint-Prex, Saint-Saphorin-sur-Morges, Tolochenaz, Vaux-sur-Morges, and Villars-sous-Yens came from the old Morges district (District de Morges).
- The municipality of Allaman came from the old District of Rolle.

On 1 July 2011 the municipalities of Colombier, Monnaz, and Saint-Saphorin-sur-Morges merged into the municipality of Echichens.

On 1 January 2021 the former municipality of Montherod merged into the municipality of Aubonne.

On 1 July 2021 the former municipalities of Apples, Cottens, Pampigny, Sévery, Bussy-Chardonney and Reverolle merged into the new municipality of Hautemorges.

== Politics ==
In the 2007 federal election the most popular party was the SVP which received 22.18% of the vote. The next three most popular parties were the SP (21.71%), the FDP (14.66%) and the Green Party (14.08%). In the federal election, a total of 19,756 votes were cast, and the voter turnout was 46.7%.

== Religion ==
From the 2000 census, 24,486 or 35.4% were Roman Catholic, while 26,305 or 38.1% belonged to the Swiss Reformed Church. Of the rest of the population, there were 1,056 members of an Orthodox church (or about 1.53% of the population), there were 46 individuals (or about 0.07% of the population) who belonged to the Christian Catholic Church, and there were 1,972 individuals (or about 2.85% of the population) who belonged to another Christian church. There were 127 individuals (or about 0.18% of the population) who were Jewish, and 2,263 (or about 3.28% of the population) who were Islamic. There were 150 individuals who were Buddhist, 85 individuals who were Hindu and 124 individuals who belonged to another church. 9,157 (or about 13.26% of the population) belonged to no church, are agnostic or atheist, and 3,306 individuals (or about 4.79% of the population) did not answer the question.

== Education ==
In Morges about 24,337 or (35.2%) of the population have completed non-mandatory upper secondary education, and 11,370 or (16.5%) have completed additional higher education (either University or a Fachhochschule). Of the 11,370 who completed tertiary schooling, 48.6% were Swiss men, 26.5% were Swiss women, 15.2% were non-Swiss men and 9.7% were non-Swiss women.

In the 2009/2010 school year there were a total of 9,184 students in the local and district school systems. In the Vaud cantonal school system, two years of non-obligatory pre-school are provided by the political districts. During the school year, the district provided pre-school care for a total of 631 children. There were 203 (32.2%) children who received subsidized pre-school care. There were 4,838 students in the primary school program, which last four years. The obligatory lower secondary school program lasts for six years and there were 4,238 students in those schools. There were also 108 students who were home schooled or attended another non-traditional school.

== Municipalities ==
The following municipalities are located within the district:

Municipality	Population (31 December 2020)	Area km^{2}
Aclens	531	3.90
Allaman	442	2.60
Aubonne	3,235	14.36
Ballens	562	8.48
Berolle	313	9.60
Bière	1,621	25.01
Bougy-Villars	478	1.77
Bremblens	584	2.90
Buchillon	687	2.13
Chavannes-le-Veyron	152	2.63
Chevilly	317	3.87
Chigny	396	0.90
Clarmont	201	1.00
Cossonay	4,223	8.29
Cuarnens	528	7.14
Denens	742	3.29
Denges	1,725	1.66
Dizy	223	3.04
Éclépens	1,218	5.81
Échandens	2,735	3.88
Échichens	3,127	2.58
Étoy	2,906	4.91
Féchy	871	2.70
Ferreyres	319	3.15
Gimel	2,311	18.89
Gollion	997	5.44
Grancy	407	5.69
Hautemorges	4,071	32.95
La Chaux (Cossonay)	392	6.75
La Sarraz	2,595	7.71
L'Isle	1,064	16.21
Lavigny	1,006	4.00
Lonay	2,675	3.71
Lully	823	2.05
Lussy-sur-Morges	722	2.34
Mauraz	59	0.50
Moiry	311	6.67
Mollens (VD)	330	11.00
Morges	16,101	3.85
Mont-la-Ville	490	19.75
Montricher	964	25.98
Orny	462	5.56
Pompaples	847	4.45
Préverenges	5,242	1.86
Romanel-sur-Morges	467	1.75
Saint-Livres	684	8.12
Saint-Oyens	460	3.05
Saint-Prex	5,855	5.52
Saubraz	423	3.70
Senarclens	492	3.97
Tolochenaz	1,892	1.59
Vaux-sur-Morges	194	2.10
Villars-sous-Yens	612	3.04
Vufflens-le-Château	872	2.14
Vullierens	542	6.84
Yens	1,479	9.51
Total	84,533	372.96
