= Sévery =

- Former municipality
- Flag Coat of arms
- Location of Sévery
- Location within Switzerland Location within Canton of Vaud
- Coordinates: 46°35′N 06°26′E
- Country: Switzerland
- Canton: Vaud
- District: Morges

Government
  - Mayor: Syndic

Area
  - Total: 2.38 km^{2} (0.92 sq mi)
- Elevation: 610 m (2,000 ft)

Population (2003)
  - Total: 219
  - Density: 92.0/km^{2} (238/sq mi)
- Time zone: UTC+01:00 (CET)
  - Summer (DST): UTC+02:00 (CEST)
- Postal code: 1141
- SFOS number: 5500
- ISO 3166 code: CH-VD
- Surrounded by: Apples, Colombier, Cottens, Pampigny
- Website: www.severy.ch

Sévery is a former municipality of the canton of Vaud in Switzerland, located in the district of Morges. On 1 July 2021 the former municipalities of Apples, Cottens, Pampigny, Sévery, Bussy-Chardonney and Reverolle merged into the new municipality of Hautemorges.

== History ==
Sévery is first mentioned in 979 as Siuiriaco. In 1453 it was mentioned as Syuiriez.

In 1291, during the crusades, a Peter de Severy, a Templar Knight in command of the castle of Acra in the Levant, lost his life defending the occupants of the same.

== Geography ==
Sévery has an area, as of 2009, of 2.38 square kilometers (0.92 sq mi). Of this area, 2.01 km^{2} (0.78 sq mi) or 84.5% is used for agricultural purposes, while 0.25 km^{2} (0.097 sq mi) or 10.5% is forested. Of the rest of the land, 0.14 km^{2} (35 acres) or 5.9% is settled (buildings or roads).

Of the built up area, housing and buildings made up 3.4% and transportation infrastructure made up 1.3%. Out of the forested land, 7.1% of the total land area is heavily forested and 3.4% is covered with orchards or small clusters of trees. Of the agricultural land, 73.5% is used for growing crops and 10.5% is pastures.

The municipality was part of the Cossonay District until it was dissolved on 31 August 2006, and Sévery became part of the new district of Morges.

== Coat of arms ==
The blazon of the municipal coat of arms is Gules, a Cross bottony Argent, in Chief Argent three Escallops Sable.

== Demographics ==
Sévery has a population (as of December 2020) of 215. As of 2008, 7.0% of the population are resident foreign nationals. Over the last 10 years (1999–2009 ) the population has changed at a rate of 30.9%. It has changed at a rate of 29% due to migration and at a rate of 3.1% due to births and deaths.

Most of the population (as of 2000) speaks French (179 or 92.7%), with German being second most common (7 or 3.6%) and Portuguese being third (3 or 1.6%). There are 2 people who speak Italian.

Of the population in the municipality 47 or about 24.4% were born in Sévery and lived there in 2000. There were 96 or 49.7% who were born in the same canton, while 28 or 14.5% were born somewhere else in Switzerland, and 20 or 10.4% were born outside of Switzerland.

In 2008 there were 2 live births to Swiss citizens and there were 2 deaths of Swiss citizens. Ignoring immigration and emigration, the population of Swiss citizens remained the same while the foreign population remained the same. At the same time, there was 1 non-Swiss woman who immigrated from another country to Switzerland. The total Swiss population change in 2008 (from all sources, including moves across municipal borders) was an increase of 3 and the non-Swiss population increased by 4 people. This represents a population growth rate of 3.4%.

The age distribution, as of 2009, in Sévery is; 28 children or 13.2% of the population are between 0 and 9 years old and 27 teenagers or 12.7% are between 10 and 19. Of the adult population, 29 people or 13.7% of the population are between 20 and 29 years old. 30 people or 14.2% are between 30 and 39, 33 people or 15.6% are between 40 and 49, and 20 people or 9.4% are between 50 and 59. The senior population distribution is 27 people or 12.7% of the population are between 60 and 69 years old, 12 people or 5.7% are between 70 and 79, there are 6 people or 2.8% who are between 80 and 89.

As of 2000, there were 74 people who were single and never married in the municipality. There were 102 married individuals, 10 widows or widowers and 7 individuals who are divorced.

As of 2000, there were 81 private households in the municipality, and an average of 2.4 persons per household. There were 23 households that consist of only one person and 4 households with five or more people. Out of a total of 82 households that answered this question, 28.0% were households made up of just one person. Of the rest of the households, there are 28 married couples without children, 28 married couples with children There were 2 households that were made up of unrelated people and 1 household that was made up of some sort of institution or another collective housing.

In 2000 there were 28 single family homes (or 48.3% of the total) out of a total of 58 inhabited buildings. There were 4 multi-family buildings (6.9%), along with 20 multi-purpose buildings that were mostly used for housing (34.5%) and 6 other use buildings (commercial or industrial) that also had some housing (10.3%). Of the single family homes 15 were built before 1919, while 6 were built between 1990 and 2000. The greatest number of multi-family homes (1) were built before 1919 and again between 1961 and 1970

In 2000 there were 81 apartments in the municipality. The most common apartment size was 3 rooms of which there were 24. There were 1 single room apartments and 25 apartments with five or more rooms. Of these apartments, a total of 79 apartments (97.5% of the total) were permanently occupied and 2 apartments (2.5%) were empty. As of 2009, the construction rate of new housing units was 0 new units per 1000 residents. The vacancy rate for the municipality, in 2010, was 0%.

The historical population is given in the following chart:

== Politics ==
In the 2007 federal election the most popular party was the SVP which received 20.58% of the vote. The next three most popular parties were the FDP (18.88%), the Green Party (16.17%) and the SP (12.19%). In the federal election, a total of 69 votes were cast, and the voter turnout was 46.6%.

== Economy ==
As of 2010, Sévery had an unemployment rate of 3.8%. As of 2008, there were 26 people employed in the primary economic sector and about 8 businesses involved in this sector. 24 people were employed in the secondary sector and there were 4 businesses in this sector. 24 people were employed in the tertiary sector, with 8 businesses in this sector. There were 110 residents of the municipality who were employed in some capacity, of which females made up 40.0% of the workforce.

In 2008 the total number of full-time equivalent jobs was 64. The number of jobs in the primary sector was 23, of which 17 were in agriculture and 6 were in forestry or lumber production. The number of jobs in the secondary sector was 22 of which 12 or (54.5%) were in manufacturing and 10 (45.5%) were in construction. The number of jobs in the tertiary sector was 19. In the tertiary sector; 7 or 36.8% were in wholesale or retail sales or the repair of motor vehicles, 2 or 10.5% were in a hotel or restaurant, 5 or 26.3% were technical professionals or scientists, 6 or 31.6% were in education.

In 2000, there were 19 workers who commuted into the municipality and 71 workers who commuted away. The municipality is a net exporter of workers, with about 3.7 workers leaving the municipality for every one entering. Of the working population, 1.8% used public transportation to get to work, and 60.9% used a private car.

== Religion ==
From the 2000 census, 33 or 17.1% were Roman Catholic, while 129 or 66.8% belonged to the Swiss Reformed Church. Of the rest of the population, there was 1 member of an Orthodox church, there was 1 individual who belongs to the Christian Catholic Church, and there was 1 individual who belongs to another Christian church. There was 1 individual who was Jewish, and there was 1 individual who was Islamic. 19 (or about 9.84% of the population) belonged to no church, are agnostic or atheist, and 7 individuals (or about 3.63% of the population) did not answer the question.

== Education ==
In Sévery about 81 or (42.0%) of the population have completed non-mandatory upper secondary education, and 26 or (13.5%) have completed additional higher education (either university or a Fachhochschule). Of the 26 who completed tertiary schooling, 61.5% were Swiss men, 30.8% were Swiss women.

In the 2009/2010 school year there were a total of 36 students in the Sévery school district. In the Vaud cantonal school system, two years of non-obligatory pre-school are provided by the political districts. During the school year, the political district provided pre-school care for a total of 631 children of which 203 children (32.2%) received subsidized pre-school care. The canton's primary school program requires students to attend for four years. There were 14 students in the municipal primary school program. The obligatory lower secondary school program lasts for six years and there were 21 students in those schools. There was also 1 student who was home schooled or attended another non-traditional school.

As of 2000, there were 18 students in Sévery who came from another municipality, while 28 residents attended schools outside the municipality.
