= Cottens, Vaud =

Cottens
- Former municipality
- Flag Coat of arms
- Location of Cottens
- Location within Switzerland Location within Canton of Vaud
- Coordinates: 46°34′N 06°27′E
- Country: Switzerland
- Canton: Vaud
- District: Morges

Government
  - Mayor: Syndic; François Delay

Area
  - Total: 2.36 km^{2} (0.91 sq mi)
- Elevation: 582 m (1,909 ft)

Population (2004)
  - Total: 404
  - Density: 171/km^{2} (443/sq mi)
- Demonym: Lè Cotéru
- Time zone: UTC+01:00 (CET)
  - Summer (DST): UTC+02:00 (CEST)
- Postal code: 1116
- SFOS number: 5478
- ISO 3166 code: CH-VD
- Surrounded by: Grancy, Vullierens, Colombier (VD), Sévery, Pampigny
- Website: Profile (in French), SFSO statistics

Cottens is a former municipality of the canton of Vaud in Switzerland, located in the district of Morges. On 1 July 2021 the former municipalities of Apples, Cottens, Pampigny, Sévery, Bussy-Chardonney and Reverolle merged into the new municipality of Hautemorges.

== History ==
Cottens is first mentioned in 1041 as Chotens.

== Geography ==
Cottens has an area, as of 2009, of 2.36 square kilometers (0.91 sq mi). Of this area, 1.78 km^{2} (0.69 sq mi) or 75.4% is used for agricultural purposes, while 0.35 km^{2} (0.14 sq mi) or 14.8% is forested. Of the rest of the land, 0.27 km^{2} (0.10 sq mi) or 11.4% is settled (buildings or roads).

Of the built up area, housing and buildings made up 6.8% and transportation infrastructure made up 3.4%. Out of the forested land, 12.7% of the total land area is heavily forested and 2.1% is covered with orchards or small clusters of trees. Of the agricultural land, 65.7% is used for growing crops and 7.2% is pastures, while 2.5% is used for orchards or vine crops.

The municipality was part of the Cossonay District until it was dissolved on 31 August 2006, and Cottens became part of the new district of Morges.

The municipality is located at the intersection of the Aubonne-Cossonay and Morges-Col du Mollendruz roads.

== Coat of arms ==
The blazon of the municipal coat of arms is Azure, a Saltire Cross pattee Argent between an Ear of Wheat, two Mullets (of five) and a Crescent all of Or.

== Demographics ==
Cottens has a population (as of December 2020) of 493. As of 2008, 15.4% of the population are resident foreign nationals. Over the last 10 years (1999–2009 ) the population has changed at a rate of 25.6%. It has changed at a rate of 16.2% due to migration and at a rate of 9.4% due to births and deaths.

Most of the population (as of 2000) speaks French (305 or 88.9%), with German being second most common (23 or 6.7%) and Portuguese being third (6 or 1.7%).

Of the population in the municipality 69 or about 20.1% were born in Cottens and lived there in 2000. There were 153 or 44.6% who were born in the same canton, while 73 or 21.3% were born somewhere else in Switzerland, and 43 or 12.5% were born outside of Switzerland.

In 2008 there were 3 live births to Swiss citizens and 2 births to non-Swiss citizens, and in same time span there were 3 deaths of Swiss citizens and 1 non-Swiss citizen death. Ignoring immigration and emigration, the population of Swiss citizens remained the same while the foreign population increased by 1. There were 4 Swiss men and 1 Swiss woman who emigrated from Switzerland. At the same time, there were 2 non-Swiss men and 3 non-Swiss women who immigrated from another country to Switzerland. The total Swiss population change in 2008 (from all sources, including moves across municipal borders) was a decrease of 7 and the non-Swiss population increased by 5 people. This represents a population growth rate of -0.5%.

The age distribution, as of 2009, in Cottens is; 61 children or 13.8% of the population are between 0 and 9 years old and 60 teenagers or 13.6% are between 10 and 19. Of the adult population, 45 people or 10.2% of the population are between 20 and 29 years old. 75 people or 17.0% are between 30 and 39, 70 people or 15.9% are between 40 and 49, and 43 people or 9.8% are between 50 and 59. The senior population distribution is 56 people or 12.7% of the population are between 60 and 69 years old, 19 people or 4.3% are between 70 and 79, there are 10 people or 2.3% who are between 80 and 89, and there are 2 people or 0.5% who are 90 and older.

As of 2000, there were 121 people who were single and never married in the municipality. There were 185 married individuals, 19 widows or widowers and 18 individuals who are divorced.

As of 2000, there were 139 private households in the municipality, and an average of 2.5 persons per household. There were 36 households that consist of only one person and 10 households with five or more people. Out of a total of 139 households that answered this question, 25.9% were households made up of just one person and there was 1 adult who lived with their parents. Of the rest of the households, there are 45 married couples without children, and 53 married couples with children There were 2 single parents with a child or children. There were 2 households that were made up of unrelated people.

In 2000 there were 51 single family homes (or 56.7% of the total) out of a total of 90 inhabited buildings. There were 14 multi-family buildings (15.6%), along with 20 multi-purpose buildings that were mostly used for housing (22.2%) and 5 other use buildings (commercial or industrial) that also had some housing (5.6%). Of the single family homes 11 were built before 1919, while 3 were built between 1990 and 2000. The greatest number of single family homes (15) were built between 1961 and 1970. The most multi-family homes (5) were built before 1919 and the next most (4) were built between 1996 and 2000.

In 2000 there were 143 apartments in the municipality. The most common apartment size was 4 rooms of which there were 53. There were 2 single room apartments and 52 apartments with five or more rooms. Of these apartments, a total of 139 apartments (97.2% of the total) were permanently occupied, while 1 apartment was seasonally occupied and 3 apartments (2.1%) were empty. As of 2009, the construction rate of new housing units was 31.7 new units per 1000 residents. The vacancy rate for the municipality, in 2010, was 0%.

The historical population is given in the following chart:

== Twin town ==
Cottens is twinned with the town of Combronde, France.

== Politics ==
In the 2007 federal election the most popular party was the SVP which received 25.26% of the vote. The next three most popular parties were the SP (22.68%), the FDP (19.11%) and the Green Party (12.54%). In the federal election, a total of 122 votes were cast, and the voter turnout was 46.6%.

== Economy ==
As of 2010, Cottens had an unemployment rate of 3.5%. As of 2008, there were 28 people employed in the primary economic sector and about 10 businesses involved in this sector. 9 people were employed in the secondary sector and there were 4 businesses in this sector. 25 people were employed in the tertiary sector, with 13 businesses in this sector. There were 189 residents of the municipality who were employed in some capacity, of which females made up 45.5% of the workforce.

In 2008 the total number of full-time equivalent jobs was 45. The number of jobs in the primary sector was 20, all of which were in agriculture. The number of jobs in the secondary sector was 8 of which 4 or (50.0%) were in manufacturing and 4 (50.0%) were in construction. The number of jobs in the tertiary sector was 17. In the tertiary sector; 3 or 17.6% were in wholesale or retail sales or the repair of motor vehicles, 3 or 17.6% were in the movement and storage of goods, 3 or 17.6% were technical professionals or scientists, 3 or 17.6% were in education and 1 was in health care.

In 2000, there were 9 workers who commuted into the municipality and 140 workers who commuted away. The municipality is a net exporter of workers, with about 15.6 workers leaving the municipality for every one entering. Of the working population, 7.4% used public transportation to get to work, and 67.2% used a private car.

== Religion ==
From the 2000 census, 77 or 22.4% were Roman Catholic, while 200 or 58.3% belonged to the Swiss Reformed Church. Of the rest of the population, there were 26 individuals (or about 7.58% of the population) who belonged to another Christian church. There was 1 individual who was Islamic. 48 (or about 13.99% of the population) belonged to no church, are agnostic or atheist, and 4 individuals (or about 1.17% of the population) did not answer the question.

== Education ==
In Cottens about 142 or (41.4%) of the population have completed non-mandatory upper secondary education, and 50 or (14.6%) have completed additional higher education (either university or a Fachhochschule). Of the 50 who completed tertiary schooling, 54.0% were Swiss men, 34.0% were Swiss women.

In the 2009/2010 school year there were a total of 57 students in the Cottens (VD) school district. In the Vaud cantonal school system, two years of non-obligatory pre-school are provided by the political districts. During the school year, the political district provided pre-school care for a total of 631 children of which 203 children (32.2%) received subsidized pre-school care. The canton's primary school program requires students to attend for four years. There were 36 students in the municipal primary school program. The obligatory lower secondary school program lasts for six years and there were 20 students in those schools. There were also 1 students who were home schooled or attended another non-traditional school.

As of 2000, there were 6 students in Cottens who came from another municipality, while 51 residents attended schools outside the municipality.
