= Colombier, Vaud =

Colombier
- Former municipality
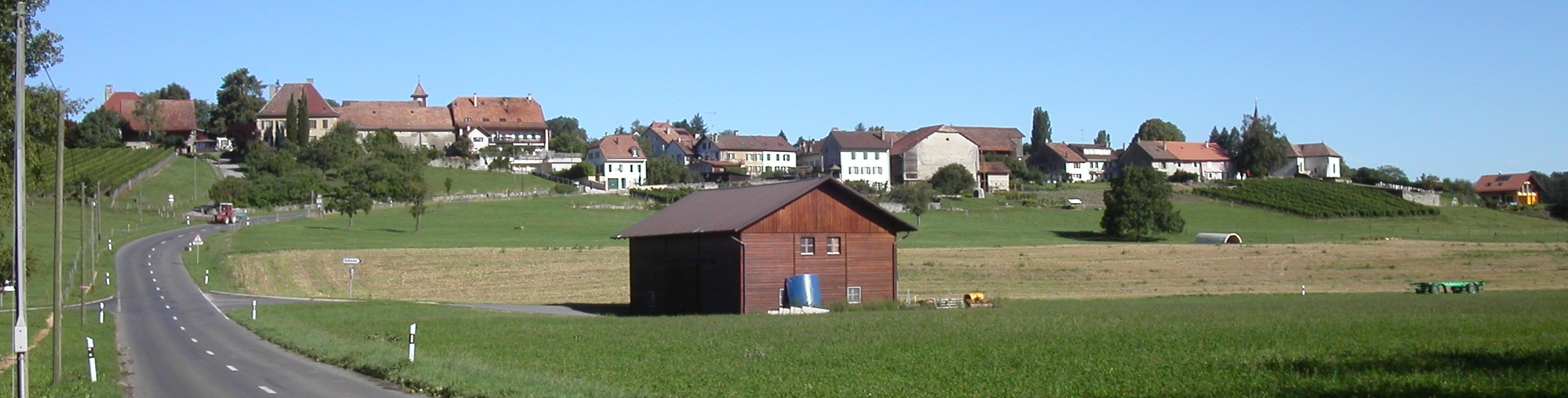
- Colombier village

- Flag Coat of arms
- Location of Colombier
- Location within Switzerland Location within Canton of Vaud
- Coordinates: 46°33′N 06°28′E
- Country: Switzerland
- Canton: Vaud
- District: Morges

Government
  - Mayor: Jean Pierre Tronchet

Area
  - Total: 5.3 km^{2} (2.0 sq mi)
- Elevation: 517 m (1,696 ft)

Population (2009)
  - Total: 512
  - Density: 97/km^{2} (250/sq mi)
- Time zone: UTC+01:00 (CET)
  - Summer (DST): UTC+02:00 (CEST)
- Postal code: 1114
- SFOS number: 5630
- ISO 3166 code: CH-VD
- Surrounded by: Apples, Clarmont, Cottens, Monnaz, Saint-Saphorin-sur-Morges, Sévery, Vaux-sur-Morges, Vullierens
- Website: Profile (in French), SFSO statistics

Colombier (French pronunciation: [kɔlɔ̃bje]) is a former municipality in the Swiss canton of Vaud, located in the district of Morges.

The municipalities of Colombier, Monnaz and Saint-Saphorin-sur-Morges merged on 1 July 2011 into the municipality of Echichens.

== History ==
Colombier is first mentioned in 937 as Columbaris.

Bertha of Swabia (c. 907 – after January 2, 966), Queen consort of Burgundy, married with Hugh of Italy on December 12, 937 in the church of Colombier. Scenes can be seen today on the stained glass windows of the church. She lived in the castle of Colombier.

== Geography ==
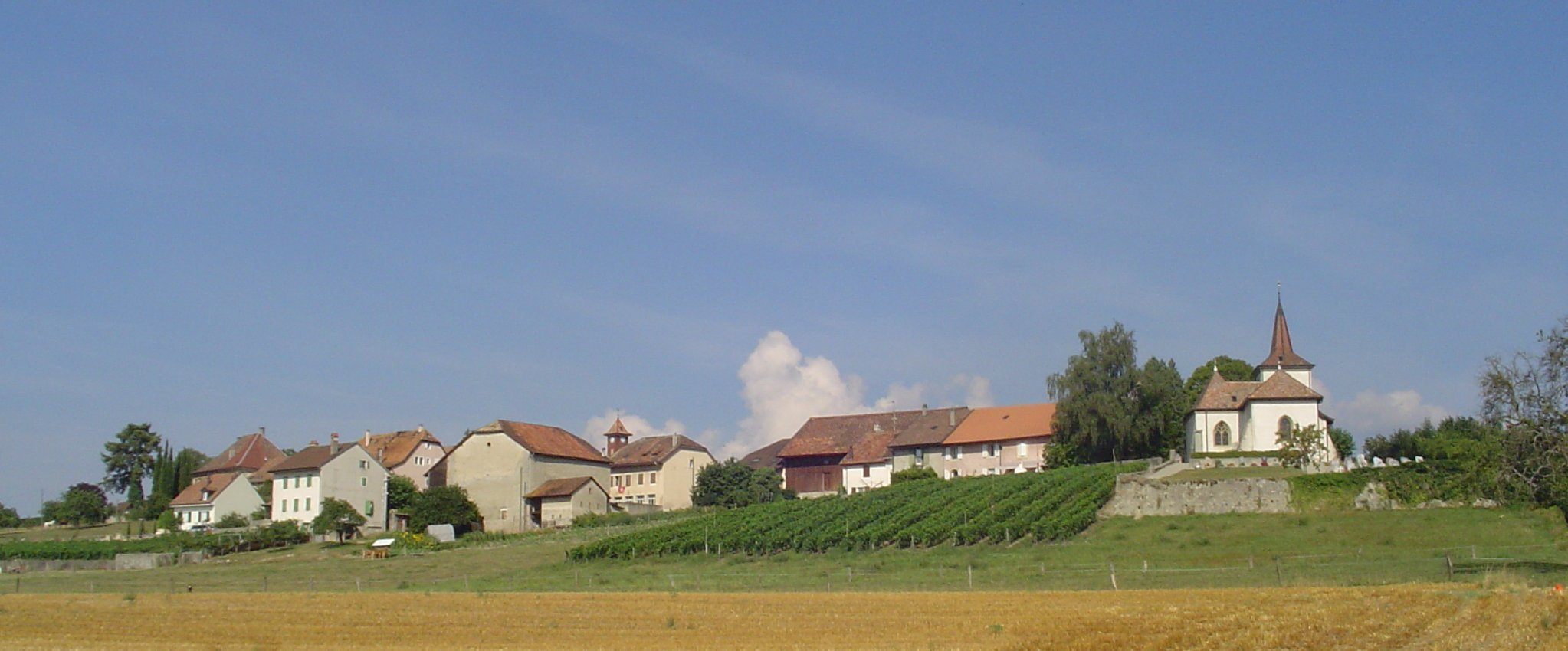
Colombier

Colombier has an area, as of 2009, of 5.3 square kilometers (2.0 mi^{2}). Of this area, 4.35 km^{2} (1.68 mi^{2}) or 82.5% is used for agricultural purposes, while 0.51 km^{2} (0.20 mi^{2}) or 9.7% is forested. Of the rest of the land, 0.36 km^{2} (0.14 mi^{2}) or 6.8% is settled (buildings or roads) and 0.04 km^{2} (9.9 acres) or 0.8% is unproductive land.

Of the built up area, housing and buildings made up 2.7% and transportation infrastructure made up 3.4%. Out of the forested land, 8.2% of the total land area is heavily forested and 1.5% is covered with orchards or small clusters of trees. Of the agricultural land, 76.7% is used for growing crops and 2.7% is pastures, while 3.2% is used for orchards or vine crops.

The municipality was part of the old Morges District until it was dissolved on 31 August 2006, and Colombier became part of the new district of Morges.

== Coat of arms ==
The blazon of the municipal coat of arms is Azure, a Chervon Argent.

== Demographics ==
Colombier has a population (As of 2009) of 512. As of 2008, 6.9% of the population are resident foreign nationals. Over the last 10 years (1999-2009 ) the population has changed at a rate of 14%. It has changed at a rate of 7.1% due to migration and at a rate of 6.7% due to births and deaths.

Most of the population (as of 2000) speaks French (420 or 92.1%), with German being second most common (26 or 5.7%) and English being third (3 or 0.7%). There is 1 person who speaks Italian.

Of the population in the municipality 131 or about 28.7% were born in Colombier and lived there in 2000. There were 197 or 43.2% who were born in the same canton, while 80 or 17.5% were born somewhere else in Switzerland, and 46 or 10.1% were born outside of Switzerland.

In 2008 there were 7 live births to Swiss citizens and 1 birth to non-Swiss citizens, and in same time span there were 3 deaths of Swiss citizens and 1 non-Swiss citizen death. Ignoring immigration and emigration, the population of Swiss citizens increased by 4 while the foreign population remained the same. There were 5 Swiss men and 2 Swiss women who immigrated back to Switzerland. At the same time, there were 3 non-Swiss men and 2 non-Swiss women who immigrated from another country to Switzerland. The total Swiss population change in 2008 (from all sources, including moves across municipal borders) was a decrease of 3 and the non-Swiss population increased by 5 people. This represents a population growth rate of 0.4%.

The age distribution, as of 2009, in Colombier is; 64 children or 12.5% of the population are between 0 and 9 years old and 75 teenagers or 14.6% are between 10 and 19. Of the adult population, 45 people or 8.8% of the population are between 20 and 29 years old. 69 people or 13.5% are between 30 and 39, 81 people or 15.8% are between 40 and 49, and 69 people or 13.5% are between 50 and 59. The senior population distribution is 59 people or 11.5% of the population are between 60 and 69 years old, 31 people or 6.1% are between 70 and 79, there are 15 people or 2.9% who are between 80 and 89, and there are 4 people or 0.8% who are 90 and older.

As of 2000, there were 202 people who were single and never married in the municipality. There were 227 married individuals, 20 widows or widowers and 7 individuals who are divorced.

As of 2000 the average number of residents per living room was 0.63 which is about equal to the cantonal average of 0.61 per room. In this case, a room is defined as space of a housing unit of at least 4 m^{2} (43 sq ft) as normal bedrooms, dining rooms, living rooms, kitchens and habitable cellars and attics. About 66.2% of the total households were owner occupied, or in other words did not pay rent (though they may have a mortgage or a rent-to-own agreement).

As of 2000, there were 163 private households in the municipality, and an average of 2.8 persons per household. There were 44 households that consist of only one person and 24 households with five or more people. Out of a total of 165 households that answered this question, 26.7% were households made up of just one person and there were 2 adults who lived with their parents. Of the rest of the households, there are 35 married couples without children, 73 married couples with children There were 6 single parents with a child or children. There were 3 households that were made up of unrelated people and 2 households that were made up of some sort of institution or another collective housing.

In 2000 there were 74 single family homes (or 60.2% of the total) out of a total of 123 inhabited buildings. There were 16 multi-family buildings (13.0%), along with 27 multi-purpose buildings that were mostly used for housing (22.0%) and 6 other use buildings (commercial or industrial) that also had some housing (4.9%). Of the single family homes 19 were built before 1919, while 20 were built between 1990 and 2000. The most multi-family homes (6) were built before 1919 and the next most (3) were built between 1961 and 1970.

In 2000 there were 171 apartments in the municipality. The most common apartment size was 4 rooms of which there were 52. There were 3 single room apartments and 71 apartments with five or more rooms. Of these apartments, a total of 157 apartments (91.8% of the total) were permanently occupied, while 7 apartments (4.1%) were seasonally occupied and 7 apartments (4.1%) were empty. As of 2009, the construction rate of new housing units was 19.5 new units per 1000 residents. The vacancy rate for the municipality, in 2010, was 0%.

The historical population is given in the following chart:

== Sights ==
The entire village of Colombier is designated as part of the Inventory of Swiss Heritage Sites.

== Politics ==
In the 2007 federal election the most popular party was the SVP which received 24.17% of the vote. The next three most popular parties were the SP (19.73%), the Green Party (15.57%) and the FDP (12.88%). In the federal election, a total of 149 votes were cast, and the voter turnout was 45.2%.

== Economy ==
As of 2010, Colombier had an unemployment rate of 3.7%. As of 2008, there were 38 people employed in the primary economic sector and about 16 businesses involved in this sector. 1 person was employed in the secondary sector and there was 1 business in this sector. 55 people were employed in the tertiary sector, with 14 businesses in this sector. There were 242 residents of the municipality who were employed in some capacity, of which females made up 41.3% of the workforce.

In 2008 the total number of full-time equivalent jobs was 68. The number of jobs in the primary sector was 27, all of which were in agriculture. The number of jobs in the secondary sector was 1, all of which were in construction. The number of jobs in the tertiary sector was 40. In the tertiary sector; 5 or 12.5% were in the sale or repair of motor vehicles, 2 or 5.0% were in the movement and storage of goods, 3 or 7.5% were in a hotel or restaurant, 1 was a technical professional or scientist, 3 or 7.5% were in education and 12 or 30.0% were in health care.

In 2000, there were 18 workers who commuted into the municipality and 178 workers who commuted away. The municipality is a net exporter of workers, with about 9.9 workers leaving the municipality for every one entering. Of the working population, 8.3% used public transportation to get to work, and 64.9% used a private car.

== Religion ==
From the 2000 census, 69 or 15.1% were Roman Catholic, while 297 or 65.1% belonged to the Swiss Reformed Church. Of the rest of the population, there was 1 member of an Orthodox church, and there were 46 individuals (or about 10.09% of the population) who belonged to another Christian church. There were 2 (or about 0.44% of the population) who were Islamic. There were 2 individuals who belonged to another church. 57 (or about 12.50% of the population) belonged to no church, are agnostic or atheist, and 5 individuals (or about 1.10% of the population) did not answer the question.

== Education ==
In Colombier about 170 or (37.3%) of the population have completed non-mandatory upper secondary education, and 87 or (19.1%) have completed additional higher education (either University or a Fachhochschule). Of the 87 who completed tertiary schooling, 63.2% were Swiss men, 29.9% were Swiss women.

In the 2009/2010 school year there were a total of 83 students in the Colombier school district. In the Vaud cantonal school system, two years of non-obligatory pre-school are provided by the political districts. During the school year, the political district provided pre-school care for a total of 631 children of which 203 children (32.2%) received subsidized pre-school care. The canton's primary school program requires students to attend for four years. There were 44 students in the municipal primary school program. The obligatory lower secondary school program lasts for six years and there were 38 students in those schools. There were also 1 students who were home schooled or attended another non-traditional school.

As of 2000, there were 30 students in Colombier who came from another municipality, while 61 residents attended schools outside the municipality.
