= Bussy-Chardonney =

- Former municipality
- Flag Coat of arms
- Location of Bussy-Chardonney
- Location within Switzerland Location within Canton of Vaud
- Coordinates: 46°32′N 06°27′E
- Country: Switzerland
- Canton: Vaud
- District: Morges

Government
  - Mayor: Syndic; Serge Gambarasi

Area
  - Total: 3.10 km^{2} (1.20 sq mi)
- Elevation: 520 m (1,710 ft)

Population (2003)
  - Total: 334
  - Density: 108/km^{2} (279/sq mi)
- Time zone: UTC+01:00 (CET)
  - Summer (DST): UTC+02:00 (CEST)
- Postal code: 1136
- SFOS number: 5625
- ISO 3166 code: CH-VD
- Localities: Bussy-sur-Morges, Chardonney-sur-Morges
- Surrounded by: Apples, Denens, Reverolle, Vaux-sur-Morges, Vufflens-le-Château, Yens
- Twin towns: Teillay (France)
- Website: www.bussy-chardonney.ch

Bussy-Chardonney (Arpitan: Bussê-Chardenê) is a former municipality in the Swiss canton of Vaud, located in the district of Morges.

The municipality was created in 1961 by a merger of Bussy-sur-Morges and Chardonney-sur-Morges. This union also existed before 1744 and between 1799 and 1819.

On 1 July 2021 the former municipalities of Apples, Cottens, Pampigny, Sévery, Bussy-Chardonney and Reverolle merged into the new municipality of Hautemorges.

== History ==
Bussy is first mentioned about 1059 as Bussi. Chardonney-sur-Morges was first mentioned in 1324 as Chardonne.

== Geography ==
Bussy-Chardonney has an area, as of 2009, of 3.1 square kilometers (1.2 mi^{2}). Of this area, 2.47 km^{2} (0.95 mi^{2}) or 81.0% is used for agricultural purposes, while 0.26 km^{2} (0.10 mi^{2}) or 8.5% is forested. Of the rest of the land, 0.32 km^{2} (0.12 mi^{2}) or 10.5% is settled (buildings or roads).

Of the built up area, housing and buildings made up 4.9% and transportation infrastructure made up 4.6%. Out of the forested land, 6.2% of the total land area is heavily forested and 2.3% is covered with orchards or small clusters of trees. Of the agricultural land, 75.1% is used for growing crops and 2.0% is pastures, while 3.9% is used for orchards or vine crops.

The municipality was part of the old Morges District until it was dissolved on 31 August 2006, and Bussy-Chardonney became part of the new district of Morges.

== Coat of arms ==
The blazon of the municipal coat of arms is Per pale, 1. Argent, a key upright Gules; 2. Gules, a thistle with a leaf Argent.

== Demographics ==
Bussy-Chardonney has a population (as of December 2020) of 404. As of 2008, 14.7% of the population are resident foreign nationals. Over the last 10 years (1999–2009) the population has changed at a rate of 28%. It has changed at a rate of 16.9% due to migration and at a rate of 11.8% due to births and deaths.

Most of the population (as of 2000) speaks French (297 or 88.1%), with German being second most common (15 or 4.5%) and Italian being third (9 or 2.7%).

Of the population in the municipality 65 or about 19.3% were born in Bussy-Chardonney and lived there in 2000. There were 135 or 40.1% who were born in the same canton, while 68 or 20.2% were born somewhere else in Switzerland, and 59 or 17.5% were born outside of Switzerland.

In 2008 there were 6 live births to Swiss citizens and were 2 deaths of Swiss citizens. Ignoring immigration and emigration, the population of Swiss citizens increased by 4 while the foreign population remained the same. At the same time, there were 3 non-Swiss men and 4 non-Swiss women who immigrated from another country to Switzerland. The total Swiss population change in 2008 (from all sources, including moves across municipal borders) was an increase of 3 and the non-Swiss population increased by 14 people. This represents a population growth rate of 4.9%.

The age distribution, as of 2009, in Bussy-Chardonney is; 66 children or 17.4% of the population are between 0 and 9 years old and 58 teenagers or 15.3% are between 10 and 19. Of the adult population, 29 people or 7.7% of the population are between 20 and 29 years old. 51 people or 13.5% are between 30 and 39, 61 people or 16.1% are between 40 and 49, and 48 people or 12.7% are between 50 and 59. The senior population distribution is 40 people or 10.6% of the population are between 60 and 69 years old, 16 people or 4.2% are between 70 and 79, there are 9 people or 2.4% who are between 80 and 89, and there is 1 person who is 90 and older.

As of 2000, there were 130 people who were single and never married in the municipality. There were 185 married individuals, 10 widows or widowers and 12 individuals who are divorced.

As of 2000, there were 125 private households in the municipality, and an average of 2.6 persons per household. There were 24 households that consist of only one person and 9 households with five or more people. Out of a total of 130 households that answered this question, 18.5% were households made up of just one person and there were 2 adults who lived with their parents. Of the rest of the households, there are 38 married couples without children, 50 married couples with children There were 9 single parents with a child or children. There were 2 households that were made up of unrelated people and 5 households that were made up of some sort of institution or another collective housing.

In 2000 there were 67 single family homes (or 70.5% of the total) out of a total of 95 inhabited buildings. There were 9 multi-family buildings (9.5%), along with 14 multi-purpose buildings that were mostly used for housing (14.7%) and 5 other use buildings (commercial or industrial) that also had some housing (5.3%). Of the single family homes 14 were built before 1919, while 9 were built between 1990 and 2000. The greatest number of single family homes (17) were built between 1971 and 1980. The most multi-family homes (4) were built before 1919 and the next most (2) were built between 1981 and 1990.

In 2000 there were 121 apartments in the municipality. The most common apartment size was 5 rooms of which there were 29. There were 1 single room apartments and 65 apartments with five or more rooms. Of these apartments, a total of 112 apartments (92.6% of the total) were permanently occupied, while 7 apartments (5.8%) were seasonally occupied and 2 apartments (1.7%) were empty. As of 2009, the construction rate of new housing units was 0 new units per 1000 residents. The vacancy rate for the municipality, in 2010, was 0%.

The historical population is given in the following chart:

== Politics ==
In the 2007 federal election the most popular party was the LPS Party which received 32.36% of the vote. The next three most popular parties were the SP (12.68%), the SVP (12.5%) and the Green Party (11.64%). In the federal election, a total of 130 votes were cast, and the voter turnout was 58.3%.

== Economy ==
As of 2010, Bussy-Chardonney had an unemployment rate of 5.3%. As of 2008, there were 22 people employed in the primary economic sector and about 6 businesses involved in this sector. 16 people were employed in the secondary sector and there were 4 businesses in this sector. 41 people were employed in the tertiary sector, with 9 businesses in this sector. There were 188 residents of the municipality who were employed in some capacity, of which females made up 42.0% of the workforce.

In 2008 the total number of full-time equivalent jobs was 59. The number of jobs in the primary sector was 13, all of which were in agriculture. The number of jobs in the secondary sector was 15, all of which were in construction. The number of jobs in the tertiary sector was 31. In the tertiary sector; 19 or 61.3% were in wholesale or retail sales or the repair of motor vehicles, 2 or 6.5% were in the movement and storage of goods, 9 or 29.0% were in a hotel or restaurant.

In 2000, there were 16 workers who commuted into the municipality and 147 workers who commuted away. The municipality is a net exporter of workers, with about 9.2 workers leaving the municipality for every one entering. Of the working population, 11.7% used public transportation to get to work, and 66.5% used a private car.

== Religion ==
From the 2000 census, 100 or 29.7% were Roman Catholic, while 168 or 49.9% belonged to the Swiss Reformed Church. Of the rest of the population, there was 1 member of an Orthodox church, and there were 36 individuals (or about 10.68% of the population) who belonged to another Christian church. There were 3 (or about 0.89% of the population) who were Islamic. 36 (or about 10.68% of the population) belonged to no church, are agnostic or atheist, and 11 individuals (or about 3.26% of the population) did not answer the question.

== Education ==
In Bussy-Chardonney about 124 or (36.8%) of the population have completed non-mandatory upper secondary education, and 67 or (19.9%) have completed additional higher education (either university or a Fachhochschule). Of the 67 who completed tertiary schooling, 47.8% were Swiss men, 29.9% were Swiss women, 14.9% were non-Swiss men and 7.5% were non-Swiss women.

In the 2009/2010 school year there were a total of 76 students in the Bussy-Chardonney school district. In the Vaud cantonal school system, two years of non-obligatory pre-school are provided by the political districts. During the school year, the political district provided pre-school care for a total of 631 children of which 203 children (32.2%) received subsidized pre-school care. The canton's primary school program requires students to attend for four years. There were 51 students in the municipal primary school program. The obligatory lower secondary school program lasts for six years and there were 24 students in those schools. There were also 1 students who were home schooled or attended another non-traditional school.

As of 2000, there was one student in Bussy-Chardonney who came from another municipality, while 29 residents attended schools outside the municipality.
