= Pampigny =

- Former municipality
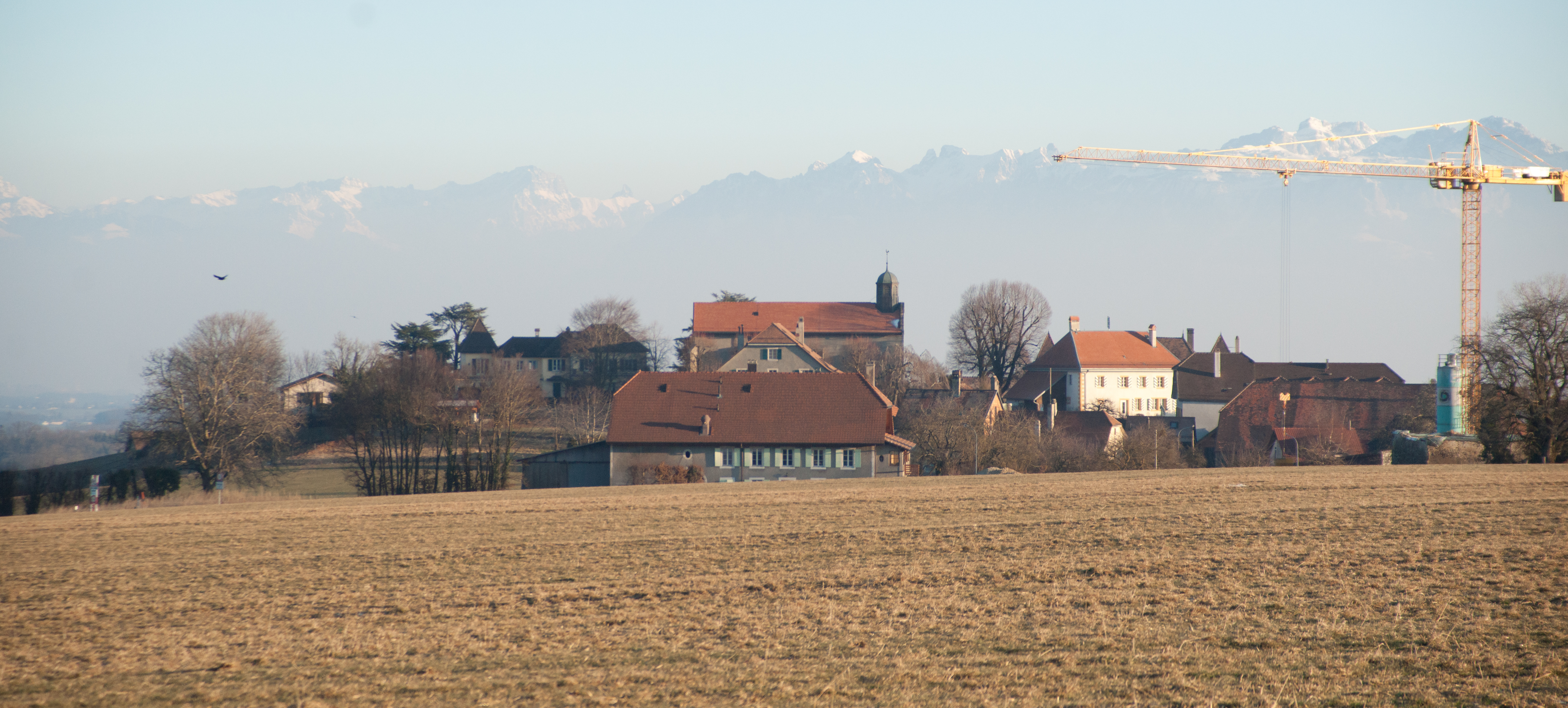
- Pampigny village

- Flag Coat of arms
- Location of Pampigny
- Location within Switzerland Location within Canton of Vaud
- Coordinates: 46°35′N 06°26′E
- Country: Switzerland
- Canton: Vaud
- District: Morges

Government
  - Mayor: Syndic

Area
  - Total: 11.09 km^{2} (4.28 sq mi)
- Elevation: 650 m (2,130 ft)

Population (2003)
  - Total: 849
  - Density: 76.6/km^{2} (198/sq mi)
- Time zone: UTC+01:00 (CET)
  - Summer (DST): UTC+02:00 (CEST)
- Postal code: 1142
- SFOS number: 5494
- ISO 3166 code: CH-VD
- Surrounded by: Apples, Chavannes-le-Veyron, Cottens, Grancy, L'Isle, Mauraz, Mollens, Montricher, Sévery
- Website: www.pampigny.ch

Pampigny is a former municipality in the district of Morges in the canton of Vaud in Switzerland. On 1 July 2021 the former municipalities of Apples, Cottens, Pampigny, Sévery, Bussy-Chardonney and Reverolle merged into the new municipality of Hautemorges.

== History ==
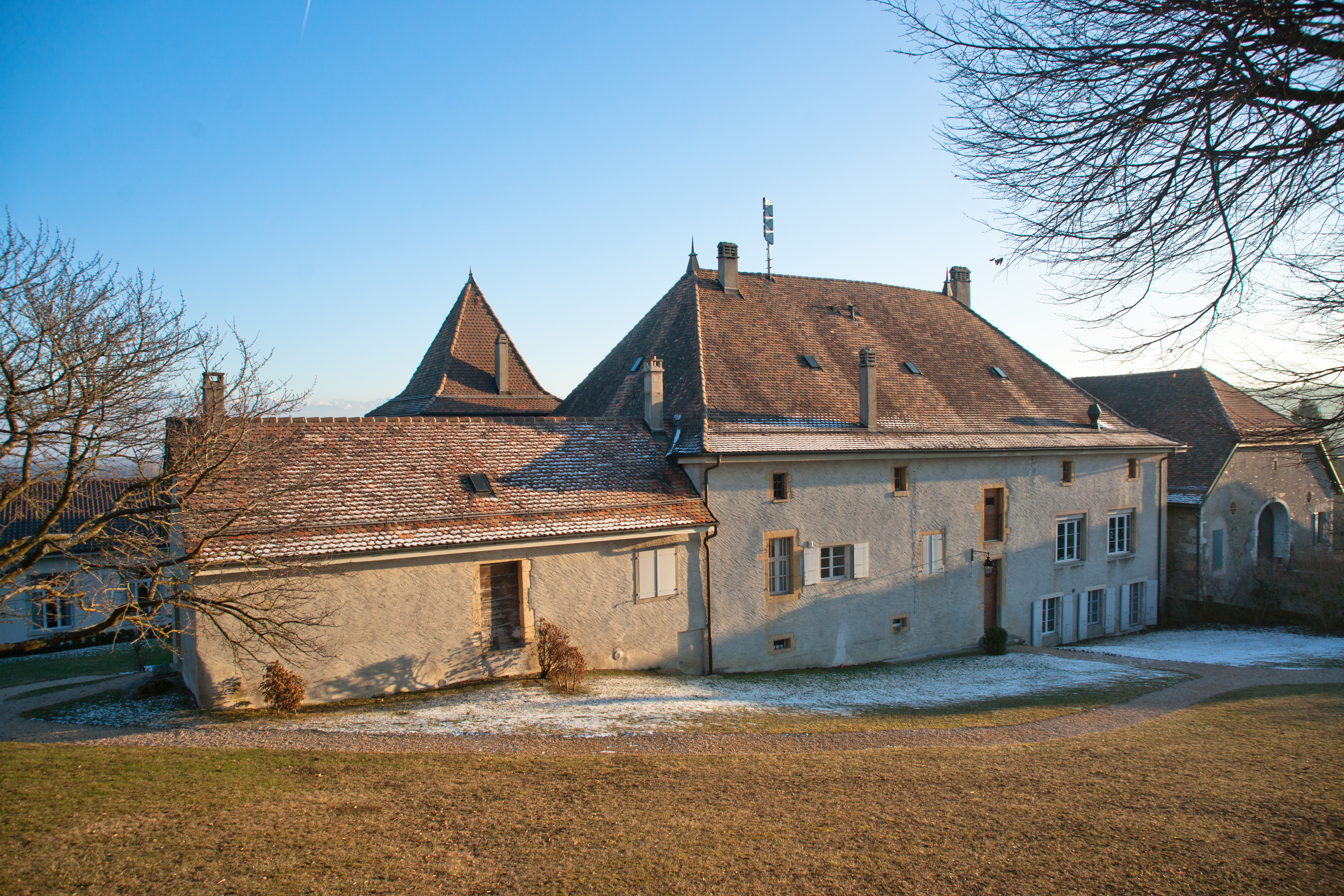
Pampigny Castle.

Pampigny is first mentioned in 1141 as Pampiniaco.

== Geography ==
Pampigny had an area, as of 2009, of 11.09 square kilometers (4.28 sq mi). Of this area, 6.4 km^{2} (2.5 sq mi) or 57.7% is used for agricultural purposes, while 4.05 km^{2} (1.56 sq mi) or 36.5% is forested. Of the rest of the land, 0.56 km^{2} (0.22 sq mi) or 5.0% is settled (buildings or roads), 0.01 km^{2} (2.5 acres) or 0.1% is either rivers or lakes and 0.07 km^{2} (17 acres) or 0.6% is unproductive land.

Of the built up area, housing and buildings made up 2.5% and transportation infrastructure made up 1.7%. Out of the forested land, all of the forested land area is covered with heavy forests. Of the agricultural land, 49.4% is used for growing crops and 8.1% is pastures. All the water in the municipality is in lakes.

The former municipality was part of the Cossonay District until it was dissolved on 31 August 2006, and Pampigny became part of the new district of Morges.

The former municipality is located at the foot of the Jura Mountains.

== Coat of arms ==
The blazon of the municipal coat of arms is Gules, two Crosses in slatire Argent, surrounded by four Acorns Or.

== Demographics ==
Pampigny had a population (as of 2019) of 1,103. As of 2008, 9.7% of the population are resident foreign nationals. Over the last 10 years (1999–2009 ) the population has changed at a rate of 20.6%. It has changed at a rate of 14.9% due to migration and at a rate of 5.1% due to births and deaths.

Most of the population (as of 2000) speaks French (765 or 92.4%), with German being second most common (33 or 4.0%) and English being third (12 or 1.4%). There are 4 people who speak Italian.

Of the population in the municipality 269 or about 32.5% were born in Pampigny and lived there in 2000. There were 299 or 36.1% who were born in the same canton, while 154 or 18.6% were born somewhere else in Switzerland, and 96 or 11.6% were born outside of Switzerland.

In 2008 there were 9 live births to Swiss citizens and 2 births to non-Swiss citizens, and in same time span there were 6 deaths of Swiss citizens. Ignoring immigration and emigration, the population of Swiss citizens increased by 3 while the foreign population increased by 2. There was 1 Swiss man and 3 Swiss women who emigrated from Switzerland. At the same time, there were 5 non-Swiss men and 3 non-Swiss women who immigrated from another country to Switzerland. The total Swiss population change in 2008 (from all sources, including moves across municipal borders) was an increase of 62 and the non-Swiss population increased by 18 people. This represents a population growth rate of 8.8%.

The age distribution, as of 2009, in Pampigny is; 118 children or 11.9% of the population are between 0 and 9 years old and 154 teenagers or 15.5% are between 10 and 19. Of the adult population, 101 people or 10.2% of the population are between 20 and 29 years old. 152 people or 15.3% are between 30 and 39, 188 people or 19.0% are between 40 and 49, and 129 people or 13.0% are between 50 and 59. The senior population distribution is 85 people or 8.6% of the population are between 60 and 69 years old, 33 people or 3.3% are between 70 and 79, there are 28 people or 2.8% who are between 80 and 89, and there are 4 people or 0.4% who are 90 and older.

As of 2000, there were 376 people who were single and never married in the municipality. There were 374 married individuals, 40 widows or widowers and 38 individuals who are divorced.

As of 2000, there were 301 private households in the municipality, and an average of 2.7 persons per household. There were 70 households that consist of only one person and 32 households with five or more people. Out of a total of 304 households that answered this question, 23.0% were households made up of just one person and there was 1 adult who lived with their parents. Of the rest of the households, there are 65 married couples without children, 132 married couples with children There were 27 single parents with a child or children. There were 6 households that were made up of unrelated people and 3 households that were made up of some sort of institution or another collective housing.

In 2000 there were 90 single family homes (or 48.4% of the total) out of a total of 186 inhabited buildings. There were 42 multi-family buildings (22.6%), along with 40 multi-purpose buildings that were mostly used for housing (21.5%) and 14 other use buildings (commercial or industrial) that also had some housing (7.5%). Of the single family homes 26 were built before 1919, while 29 were built between 1990 and 2000. The greatest number of single family homes (27) were built between 1991 and 1995. The most multi-family homes (18) were built before 1919 and the next most (6) were built between 1981 and 1990. There were 2 multi-family houses built between 1996 and 2000.

In 2000 there were 327 apartments in the municipality. The most common apartment size was 4 rooms of which there were 93. There were 12 single room apartments and 117 apartments with five or more rooms. Of these apartments, a total of 287 apartments (87.8% of the total) were permanently occupied, while 21 apartments (6.4%) were seasonally occupied and 19 apartments (5.8%) were empty. As of 2009, the construction rate of new housing units was 40.2 new units per 1000 residents. The vacancy rate for the municipality, in 2010, was 0%.

The historical population is given in the following chart:

== Sights ==
The entire village of Pampigny is designated as part of the Inventory of Swiss Heritage Sites.

== Politics ==
In the 2007 federal election the most popular party was the SP which received 26.25% of the vote. The next three most popular parties were the SVP (20.44%), the Green Party (15.28%) and the FDP (12.76%). In the federal election, a total of 230 votes were cast, and the voter turnout was 37.5%.

== Economy ==
As of 2010, Pampigny had an unemployment rate of 3.8%. As of 2008, there were 60 people employed in the primary economic sector and about 23 businesses involved in this sector. 51 people were employed in the secondary sector and there were 11 businesses in this sector. 75 people were employed in the tertiary sector, with 24 businesses in this sector. There were 388 residents of the municipality who were employed in some capacity, of which females made up 43.3% of the workforce.

In 2008 the total number of full-time equivalent jobs was 155. The number of jobs in the primary sector was 48, of which 39 were in agriculture and 9 were in forestry or lumber production. The number of jobs in the secondary sector was 47 of which 44 or (93.6%) were in manufacturing and 3 (6.4%) were in construction. The number of jobs in the tertiary sector was 60. In the tertiary sector; 13 or 21.7% were in wholesale or retail sales or the repair of motor vehicles, 12 or 20.0% were in the movement and storage of goods, 8 or 13.3% were in a hotel or restaurant, 1 was in the information industry, 1 was the insurance or financial industry, 9 or 15.0% were technical professionals or scientists, 6 or 10.0% were in education and 2 or 3.3% were in health care.

In 2000, there were 64 workers who commuted into the municipality and 259 workers who commuted away. The municipality is a net exporter of workers, with about 4.0 workers leaving the municipality for every one entering. Of the working population, 6.7% used public transportation to get to work, and 66.8% used a private car.

== Religion ==
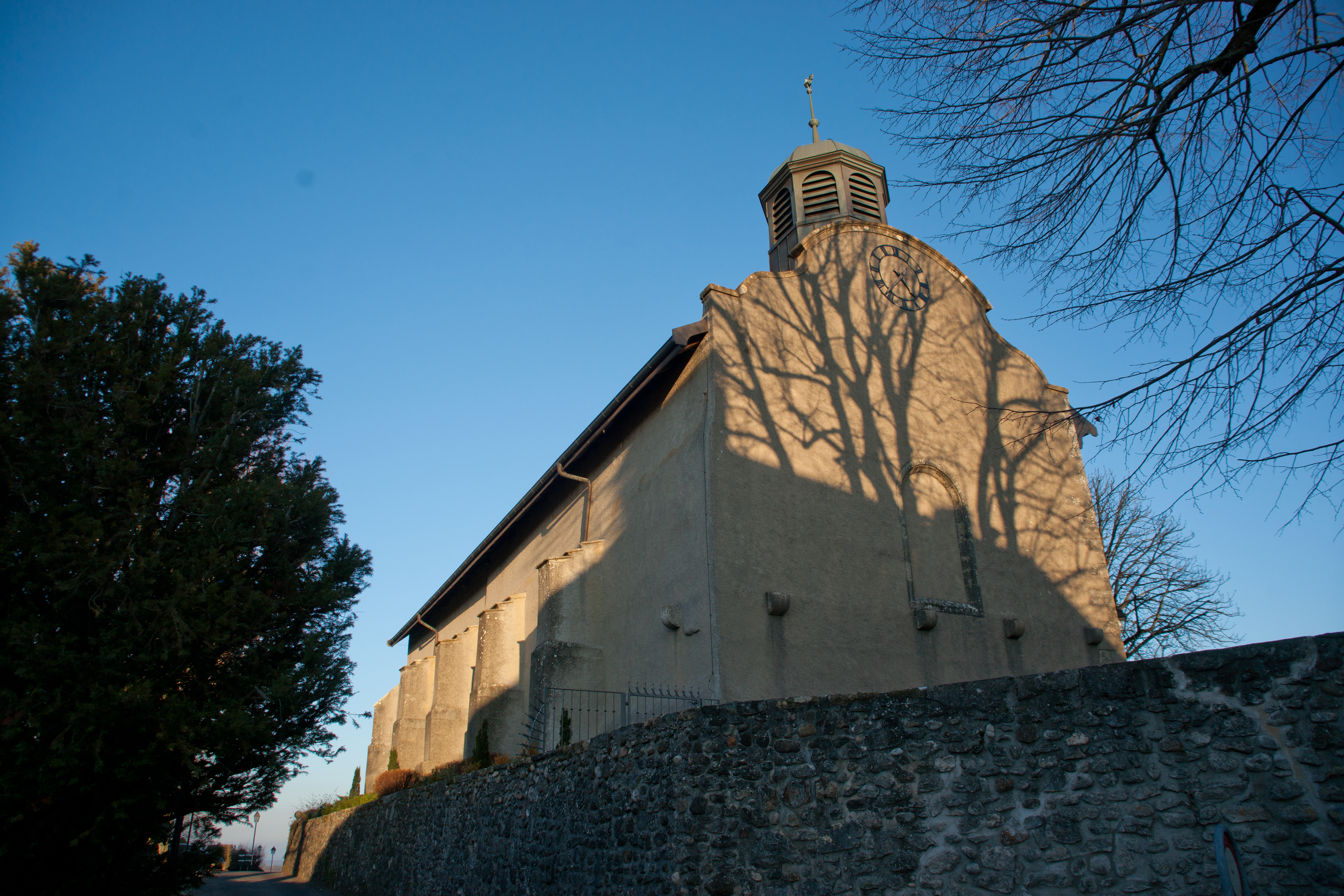
Pampigny church

From the 2000 census, 145 or 17.5% were Roman Catholic, while 480 or 58.0% belonged to the Swiss Reformed Church. Of the rest of the population, there were 2 members of an Orthodox church (or about 0.24% of the population), and there were 118 individuals (or about 14.25% of the population) who belonged to another Christian church. There were 2 individuals (or about 0.24% of the population) who were Jewish, and there was 1 individual who was Islamic. There were 2 individuals who were Buddhist. 123 (or about 14.86% of the population) belonged to no church, are agnostic or atheist, and 14 individuals (or about 1.69% of the population) did not answer the question.

== Education ==
In Pampigny about 270 or (32.6%) of the population have completed non-mandatory upper secondary education, and 126 or (15.2%) have completed additional higher education (either university or a Fachhochschule). Of the 126 who completed tertiary schooling, 58.7% were Swiss men, 27.0% were Swiss women, 7.1% were non-Swiss men and 7.1% were non-Swiss women.

In the 2009/2010 school year there were a total of 157 students in the Pampigny school district. In the Vaud cantonal school system, two years of non-obligatory pre-school are provided by the political districts. During the school year, the political district provided pre-school care for a total of 631 children of which 203 children (32.2%) received subsidized pre-school care. The canton's primary school program requires students to attend for four years. There were 78 students in the municipal primary school program. The obligatory lower secondary school program lasts for six years and there were 75 students in those schools. There were also 4 students who were home schooled or attended another non-traditional school.

As of 2000, there were 35 students in Pampigny who came from another municipality, while 144 residents attended schools outside the municipality.
