= Vufflens-le-Château =

- Municipality
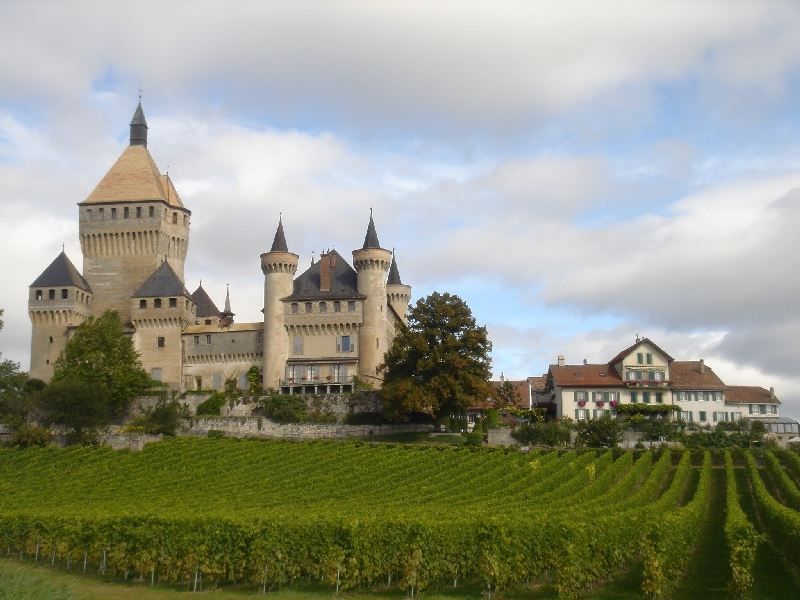
- Vufflens-le-Château village and castle

- Flag Coat of arms
- Location of Vufflens-le-Château
- Location within Switzerland Location within Canton of Vaud
- Coordinates: 46°32′N 6°28′E
- Country: Switzerland
- Canton: Vaud
- District: Morges

Government
  - Mayor: Syndic; Mme Anne-Christine Ganshof

Area
  - Total: 2.14 km^{2} (0.83 sq mi)
- Elevation: 473 m (1,552 ft)

Population (2003)
  - Total: 688
  - Density: 321/km^{2} (833/sq mi)
- Time zone: UTC+01:00 (CET)
  - Summer (DST): UTC+02:00 (CEST)
- Postal code: 1134
- SFOS number: 5653
- ISO 3166 code: CH-VD
- Surrounded by: Bussy-Chardonney, Chigny, Denens, Lully, Monnaz, Morges, Vaux-sur-Morges
- Website: www.vufflens-le-chateau.ch

Vufflens-le-Château (French pronunciation: [vyflɑ̃ l(ə) ʃato]; lit. 'Vufflens-the-Castle') is a municipality in the Swiss canton of Vaud, located in the district of Morges.

== Geography ==
Aerial view (1949)

Vufflens-le-Château has an area, as of 2009, of 2.1 square kilometers (0.81 mi^{2}). Of this area, 1.49 km^{2} (0.58 mi^{2}) or 69.6% is used for agricultural purposes, while 0.28 km^{2} (0.11 mi^{2}) or 13.1% is forested. Of the rest of the land, 0.4 km^{2} (0.15 mi^{2}) or 18.7% is settled (buildings or roads).

Of the built up area, housing and buildings made up 15.9% and transportation infrastructure made up 2.3%. Out of the forested land, 9.8% of the total land area is heavily forested and 3.3% is covered with orchards or small clusters of trees. Of the agricultural land, 47.2% is used for growing crops and 3.7% is pastures, while 18.7% is used for orchards or vine crops.

The municipality was part of the Morges District until it was dissolved on 31 August 2006, and Vufflens-le-Château became part of the new district of Morges.

== Coat of arms ==
The blazon of the municipal coat of arms is Pally of Six Or and Azure, overall a Bar of the first.

== Demographics ==
Vufflens-le-Château has a population (as of December 2020) of 872. As of 2008, 16.8% of the population are resident foreign nationals. Over the last 10 years (1999–2009 ) the population has changed at a rate of 25.1%.

Most of the population (as of 2000) speaks French (535 or 84.8%), with German being second most common (42 or 6.7%) and English being third (25 or 4.0%).

Of the population in the municipality 110 or about 17.4% were born in Vufflens-le-Château and lived there in 2000. There were 263 or 41.7% who were born in the same canton, while 107 or 17.0% were born somewhere else in Switzerland, and 141 or 22.3% were born outside of Switzerland.

The age distribution, as of 2009, in Vufflens-le-Château is; 103 children or 13.5% of the population are between 0 and 9 years old and 119 teenagers or 15.6% are between 10 and 19. Of the adult population, 61 people or 8.0% of the population are between 20 and 29 years old. 100 people or 13.1% are between 30 and 39, 134 people or 17.5% are between 40 and 49, and 108 people or 14.1% are between 50 and 59. The senior population distribution is 79 people or 10.3% of the population are between 60 and 69 years old, 47 people or 6.1% are between 70 and 79, there are 13 people or 1.7% who are between 80 and 89, and there is 1 person who is 90 and older.

The historical population is given in the following chart:

== Heritage sites of national significance ==
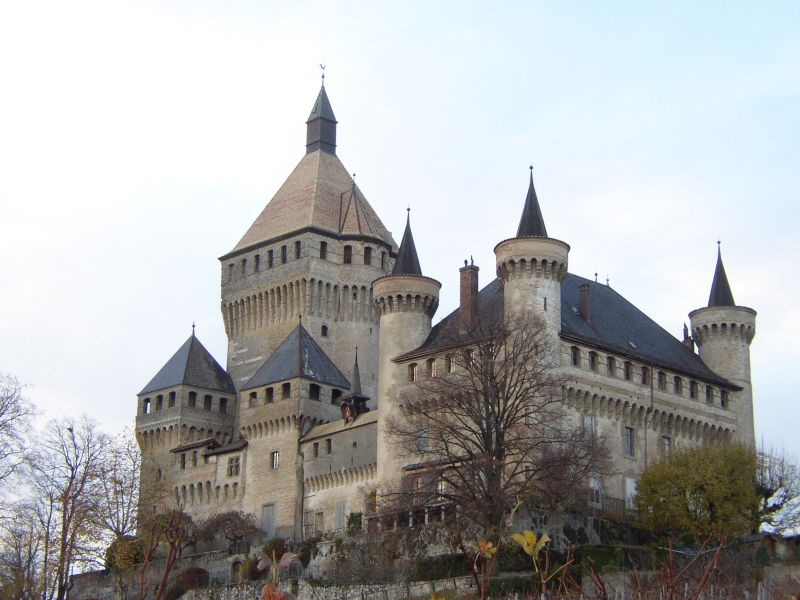
Vufflens Castle.

Vufflens Castle is listed as a Swiss heritage site of national significance. The entire area around Vufflens-le-Château is part of the Inventory of Swiss Heritage Sites.

== Politics ==
In the 2007 federal election the most popular party was the SVP which received 21.62% of the vote. The next three most popular parties were the FDP (17.89%), the SP (16.45%) and the Green Party (15.05%). In the federal election, a total of 253 votes were cast, and the voter turnout was 55.5%.

== Economy ==
As of 2010, Vufflens-le-Château had an unemployment rate of 3%. As of 2008, there were 32 people employed in the primary economic sector and about 6 businesses involved in this sector. 12 people were employed in the secondary sector and there were 5 businesses in this sector. 58 people were employed in the tertiary sector, with 15 businesses in this sector. There were 320 residents of the municipality who were employed in some capacity, of which females made up 41.9% of the workforce.

In 2008 the total number of full-time equivalent jobs was 77. The number of jobs in the primary sector was 15, all of which were in agriculture. The number of jobs in the secondary sector was 12, all of which were in construction. The number of jobs in the tertiary sector was 50. In the tertiary sector; 1 was in the sale or repair of motor vehicles, 12 or 24.0% were in a hotel or restaurant, 8 or 16.0% were in the information industry, 6 or 12.0% were technical professionals or scientists, 8 or 16.0% were in education.

In 2000, there were 54 workers who commuted into the municipality and 259 workers who commuted away. The municipality is a net exporter of workers, with about 4.8 workers leaving the municipality for every one entering. Of the working population, 20.3% used public transportation to get to work, and 61.9% used a private car.

The municipality is served by a station on the Bière–Apples–Morges railway.

== Religion ==
From the 2000 census, 166 or 26.3% were Roman Catholic, while 336 or 53.2% belonged to the Swiss Reformed Church. Of the rest of the population, there was 1 member of an Orthodox church, and there were 29 individuals (or about 4.60% of the population) who belonged to another Christian church. There were 5 individuals (or about 0.79% of the population) who were Jewish, and 89 (or about 14.10% of the population) belonged to no church, are agnostic or atheist, and 17 individuals (or about 2.69% of the population) did not answer the question.

== Education ==
In Vufflens-le-Château about 202 or (32.0%) of the population have completed non-mandatory upper secondary education, and 174 or (27.6%) have completed additional higher education (either university or a Fachhochschule).

In the 2009/2010 school year there were a total of 118 students in the Vufflens-le-Château school district. In the Vaud cantonal school system, two years of non-obligatory pre-school are provided by the political districts. During the school year, the political district provided pre-school care for a total of 631 children of which 203 children (32.2%) received subsidized pre-school care. The canton's primary school program requires students to attend for four years. There were 65 students in the municipal primary school program. The obligatory lower secondary school program lasts for six years and there were 53 students in those schools.

== Notable residents ==
Ferdinand de Saussure, Michael Schumacher, and Mick Schumacher lived in Vufflens-le-Château.
