= Vaux-sur-Morges =

- Municipality
- Flag Coat of arms
- Location of Vaux-sur-Morges
- Location within Switzerland Location within Canton of Vaud
- Coordinates: 46°32′N 06°28′E
- Country: Switzerland
- Canton: Vaud
- District: Morges

Government
  - Mayor: Syndic; Philippe Sutter

Area
  - Total: 2.10 km^{2} (0.81 sq mi)
- Elevation: 504 m (1,654 ft)

Population (2003)
  - Total: 166
  - Density: 79.0/km^{2} (205/sq mi)
- Time zone: UTC+01:00 (CET)
  - Summer (DST): UTC+02:00 (CEST)
- Postal code: 1126
- SFOS number: 5650
- ISO 3166 code: CH-VD
- Surrounded by: Bussy-Chardonney, Clarmont, Colombier, Monnaz, Reverolle, Vufflens-le-Château
- Website: www.vaux-sur-morges.ch

Vaux-sur-Morges is a municipality in the Swiss canton of Vaud, located in the district of Morges.

== Geography ==
Vaux-sur-Morges has an area, as of 2009, of 2.1 square kilometers (0.81 mi^{2}). Of this area, 1.57 km^{2} (0.61 mi^{2}) or 74.8% is used for agricultural purposes, while 0.28 km^{2} (0.11 mi^{2}) or 13.3% is forested. Of the rest of the land, 0.22 km^{2} (0.085 mi^{2}) or 10.5% is settled (buildings or roads).

Of the built up area, housing and buildings made up 4.8% and transportation infrastructure made up 4.8%. Out of the forested land, 9.5% of the total land area is heavily forested and 3.8% is covered with orchards or small clusters of trees. Of the agricultural land, 61.4% is used for growing crops and 9.5% is pastures, while 3.8% is used for orchards or vine crops.

The municipality was part of the Morges District until it was dissolved on 31 August 2006, and Vaux-sur-Morges became part of the new district of Morges.

== Coat of arms ==
The blazon of the municipal coat of arms is Gules, a Bar Argent between three Escallops Or, two and one.

== Demographics ==
Vaux-sur-Morges has a population (as of December 2020) of 194. As of 2008, 12.1% of the population are resident foreign nationals. Over the last 10 years (1999–2009 ) the population has changed at a rate of 24.6%. It has changed at a rate of 13% due to migration and at a rate of 13.8% due to births and deaths.

Most of the population (as of 2000) speaks French (139 or 88.0%), with English being second most common (11 or 7.0%) and German being third (5 or 3.2%).

Of the population in the municipality 32 or about 20.3% were born in Vaux-sur-Morges and lived there in 2000. There were 77 or 48.7% who were born in the same canton, while 23 or 14.6% were born somewhere else in Switzerland, and 26 or 16.5% were born outside of Switzerland.

In 2008 there was 1 live birth to Swiss citizens. Ignoring immigration and emigration, the population of Swiss citizens increased by 1 while the foreign population remained the same. There was 1 Swiss man who emigrated from Switzerland. At the same time, there was 1 non-Swiss man and 1 non-Swiss woman who emigrated from Switzerland to another country. The total Swiss population change in 2008 (from all sources, including moves across municipal borders) was a decrease of 1 and the non-Swiss population decreased by 4 people. This represents a population growth rate of −2.8%.

The age distribution, as of 2009, in Vaux-sur-Morges is; 27 children or 15.7% of the population are between 0 and 9 years old and 29 teenagers or 16.9% are between 10 and 19. Of the adult population, 12 people or 7.0% of the population are between 20 and 29 years old. 13 people or 7.6% are between 30 and 39, 32 people or 18.6% are between 40 and 49, and 25 people or 14.5% are between 50 and 59. The senior population distribution is 20 people or 11.6% of the population are between 60 and 69 years old, 11 people or 6.4% are between 70 and 79, there are 3 people or 1.7% who are between 80 and 89.

As of 2000, there were 63 people who were single and never married in the municipality. There were 82 married individuals, 8 widows or widowers and 5 individuals who are divorced.

As of 2000, there were 55 private households in the municipality, and an average of 2.8 persons per household. There were 10 households that consist of only one person and 6 households with five or more people. Out of a total of 58 households that answered this question, 17.2% were households made up of just one person. Of the rest of the households, there are 14 married couples without children, 28 married couples with children There were 3 single parents with a child or children.

In 2000 there were 23 single family homes (or 51.1% of the total) out of a total of 45 inhabited buildings. There were 4 multi-family buildings (8.9%), along with 17 multi-purpose buildings that were mostly used for housing (37.8%) and 1 other use buildings (commercial or industrial) that also had some housing (2.2%). Of the single family homes 5 were built before 1919, while 11 were built between 1990 and 2000. The most multi-family homes (2) were built before 1919 and the next most (1) were built between 1981 and 1990.

In 2000 there were 57 apartments in the municipality. The most common apartment size was 5 rooms of which there were 18. There were 1 single room apartments and 39 apartments with five or more rooms. Of these apartments, a total of 54 apartments (94.7% of the total) were permanently occupied, while 3 apartments (5.3%) were seasonally occupied. As of 2009, the construction rate of new housing units was 0 new units per 1000 residents. The vacancy rate for the municipality, in 2010, was 0%.

The historical population is given in the following chart:

== Politics ==
In the 2007 federal election the most popular party was the SVP which received 25.2% of the vote. The next three most popular parties were the LPS Party (15.83%), the CVP (14.47%) and the FDP (12.65%). In the federal election, a total of 66 votes were cast, and the voter turnout was 61.7%.

== Economy ==
As of 2010, Vaux-sur-Morges had an unemployment rate of 1.2%. As of 2008, there were 19 people employed in the primary economic sector and about 8 businesses involved in this sector. 11 people were employed in the secondary sector and there were 2 businesses in this sector. 7 people were employed in the tertiary sector, with 4 businesses in this sector. There were 84 residents of the municipality who were employed in some capacity, of which females made up 48.8% of the workforce.

In 2008 the total number of full-time equivalent jobs was 27. The number of jobs in the primary sector was 12, all of which were in agriculture. The number of jobs in the secondary sector was 10, all of which were in manufacturing. The number of jobs in the tertiary sector was 5. In the tertiary sector; 5 or 100.0% were technical professionals or scientists, .

In 2000, there were 7 workers who commuted into the municipality and 63 workers who commuted away. The municipality is a net exporter of workers, with about 9.0 workers leaving the municipality for every one entering. Of the working population, 8.3% used public transportation to get to work, and 66.7% used a private car.

== Religion ==
From the 2000 census, 29 or 18.4% were Roman Catholic, while 93 or 58.9% belonged to the Swiss Reformed Church. Of the rest of the population, there were 35 individuals (or about 22.15% of the population) who belonged to another Christian church. 15 (or about 9.49% of the population) belonged to no church, are agnostic or atheist, and 1 individuals (or about 0.63% of the population) did not answer the question.

== Education ==
In Vaux-sur-Morges about 45 or (28.5%) of the population have completed non-mandatory upper secondary education, and 39 or (24.7%) have completed additional higher education (either university or a Fachhochschule). Of the 39 who completed tertiary schooling, 46.2% were Swiss men, 35.9% were Swiss women.

In the 2009/2010 school year there were a total of 32 students in the Vaux-sur-Morges school district. In the Vaud cantonal school system, two years of non-obligatory pre-school are provided by the political districts. During the school year, the political district provided pre-school care for a total of 631 children of which 203 children (32.2%) received subsidized pre-school care. The canton's primary school program requires students to attend for four years. There were 18 students in the municipal primary school program. The obligatory lower secondary school program lasts for six years and there were 14 students in those schools.

As of 2000, there were 3 students in Vaux-sur-Morges who came from another municipality, while 29 residents attended schools outside the municipality.
