= Essertines =

Essertines may refer to:

- Essertines-sur-Rolle, Vaud, Switzerland
- Essertines-sur-Yverdon, Vaud, Switzerland
