= Jean Lecoultre =

Swiss painter (1930–2023)

- Born: June 9, 1930; Lausanne, Switzerland
- Died: March 22, 2023 (aged 92); Lausanne, Switzerland
- Known for: Painting
- Movement: Surrealism, Hyperrealism, Pop art

Jean Lecoultre (9 June 1930 – 22 March 2023) was a Swiss painter from Le Chenit.

== Life and career ==
Lecoultre was born in Lausanne on 9 June 1930, the son of Emile Julien Lecoultre, a bank employee, and Elize Jeanne née Motta, of Italian origin. In 1952 he married Acacia Jerez Aguilar, a Spanish national.

After attending the commercial school in Lausanne, he took classes at the studio-school of Georges Aubert (1949) and continued his training as a self-taught artist. He settled in Madrid in 1951 and became involved in the avant-garde scene there, forming a connection with Antonio Saura. Drawn to a "tenebriste" style depicting timeless Castilian landscapes, he received the Swiss federal fine arts grant in 1955 and 1956.

Back in Lausanne from 1957, he was influenced from 1963 onward by pop art, and subsequently by hyperrealism. Around 1975, his painting turned toward the representation of spaces closer to surrealist orthodoxy. He served as a member of the Federal Art Commission from 1973 to 1975. In 1978, Lecoultre represented Switzerland at the Venice Biennale. Major exhibitions were devoted to his work in Madrid, Barcelona, Cuenca, and Martigny in 2002.

== Bibliography ==
- Jean Lecoultre, exhibition catalogue, Martigny, 2002
- Dictionnaire biographique de l'art suisse. DBAS. p. 618.
