= Saint-Oyens =

- Municipality
- Flag Coat of arms
- Location of Saint-Oyens
- Location within Switzerland Location within Canton of Vaud
- Coordinates: 46°30′N 06°19′E
- Country: Switzerland
- Canton: Vaud
- District: Morges

Government
  - Mayor: Syndic

Area
  - Total: 3.05 km^{2} (1.18 sq mi)
- Elevation: 731 m (2,398 ft)

Population (2003)
  - Total: 237
  - Density: 77.7/km^{2} (201/sq mi)
- Time zone: UTC+01:00 (CET)
  - Summer (DST): UTC+02:00 (CEST)
- Postal code: 1187
- SFOS number: 5436
- ISO 3166 code: CH-VD
- Surrounded by: Burtigny, Essertines-sur-Rolle, Gimel, Longirod
- Twin towns: Saint-Oyen (France), Saint-Oyen (Italy)
- Website: www.saint-oyens.ch

Saint-Oyens is a municipality in the Swiss canton of Vaud located at the foot of the Jura Mountains. It lies in the district of Morges.

== History ==
Saint-Oyens is first mentioned in 1139 as Sancto Eugendo (Medieval Latin for Saint Eugendus). By the 13th Century the church of Saint Oyens was first mentioned and it was totally rebuilt during 1877-78.

Some farmhouses in the municipality are from the 18th and 19th Centuries.

== Geography ==
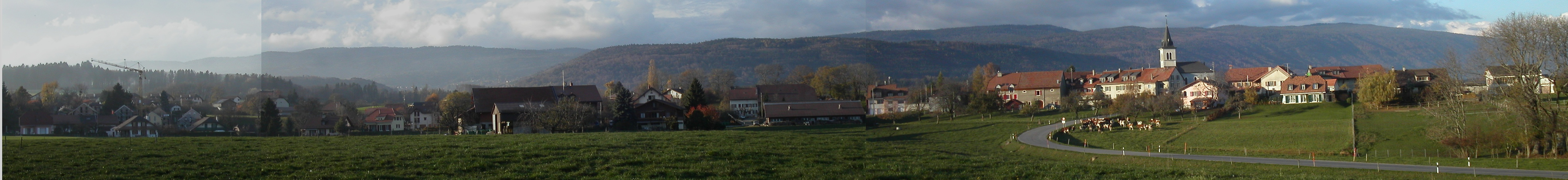
Panorama of Saint-Oyens

Saint-Oyens has an area, as of 2009, of 3.05 square kilometers (1.18 sq mi). Of this area, 1.72 km^{2} (0.66 sq mi) or 56.4% is used for agricultural purposes, while 1.17 km^{2} (0.45 sq mi) or 38.4% is forested. Of the rest of the land, 0.15 km^{2} (37 acres) or 4.9% is settled (buildings or roads).

Of the built up area, housing and buildings made up 2.6% and transportation infrastructure made up 1.0%. Power and water infrastructure as well as other special developed areas made up 1.3% of the area Out of the forested land, 36.7% of the total land area is heavily forested and 1.6% is covered with orchards or small clusters of trees. Of the agricultural land, 43.9% is used for growing crops and 11.8% is pastures.

The municipality was part of the Aubonne District until it was dissolved on 31 August 2006, and Saint-Oyens became part of the new district of Morges.

The municipality is located between the vineyards of La Côte and the Jura Mountains.

== Coat of arms ==
The blazon of the municipal coat of arms is Gules, in Chief Or an Eagle Sable.

== Demographics ==
Saint-Oyens has a population (as of December 2020) of 460. As of 2008, 16.1% of the population are resident foreign nationals. Over the last 10 years (1999–2009) the population has changed at a rate of 26.1%. It has changed at a rate of 26.5% due to migration and at a rate of -1.2% due to births and deaths.

Most of the population (as of 2000) speaks French (214 or 90.3%), with German being second most common (9 or 3.8%) and English being third (8 or 3.4%). There is 1 person who speaks Italian.

Of the population in the municipality 84 or about 35.4% were born in Saint-Oyens and lived there in 2000. There were 61 or 25.7% who were born in the same canton, while 53 or 22.4% were born somewhere else in Switzerland, and 33 or 13.9% were born outside of Switzerland.

In 2008 there was 1 live birth to Swiss citizens and 1 death of a Swiss citizen. Ignoring immigration and emigration, the population of Swiss citizens remained the same while the foreign population remained the same. There was 1 Swiss woman who emigrated from Switzerland. At the same time, there were 4 non-Swiss men and 3 non-Swiss women who immigrated from another country to Switzerland. The total Swiss population change in 2008 (from all sources, including moves across municipal borders) was a decrease of 4 and the non-Swiss population increased by 9 people. This represents a population growth rate of 1.7%.

The age distribution, as of 2009, in Saint-Oyens is; 36 children or 11.7% of the population are between 0 and 9 years old and 42 teenagers or 13.6% are between 10 and 19. Of the adult population, 35 people or 11.4% of the population are between 20 and 29 years old. 30 people or 9.7% are between 30 and 39, 53 people or 17.2% are between 40 and 49, and 53 people or 17.2% are between 50 and 59. The senior population distribution is 34 people or 11.0% of the population are between 60 and 69 years old, 12 people or 3.9% are between 70 and 79, there are 7 people or 2.3% who are between 80 and 89, and there are 6 people or 1.9% who are 90 and older.

As of 2000, there were 88 people who were single and never married in the municipality. There were 129 married individuals, 11 widows or widowers and 9 individuals who are divorced.

As of 2000, there were 93 private households in the municipality, and an average of 2.5 persons per household. There were 25 households that consist of only one person and 8 households with five or more people. Out of a total of 95 households that answered this question, 26.3% were households made up of just one person. Of the rest of the households, there are 27 married couples without children, 36 married couples with children There were 4 single parents with a child or children. There was 1 household that was made up of unrelated people and 2 households that were made up of some sort of institution or another collective housing.

In 2000 there were 48 single family homes (or 57.1% of the total) out of a total of 84 inhabited buildings. There were 5 multi-family buildings (6.0%), along with 22 multi-purpose buildings that were mostly used for housing (26.2%) and 9 other use buildings (commercial or industrial) that also had some housing (10.7%). Of the single family homes 2 were built before 1919, while 17 were built between 1990 and 2000. The greatest number of single family homes (18) were built between 1971 and 1980. The most multi-family homes (2) were built between 1981 and 1990 and the next most (1) were built before 1919. There was 1 multi-family house built between 1996 and 2000.

In 2000 there were 103 apartments in the municipality. The most common apartment size was 4 rooms of which there were 31. There were 4 single room apartments and 43 apartments with five or more rooms. Of these apartments, a total of 93 apartments (90.3% of the total) were permanently occupied, while 6 apartments (5.8%) were seasonally occupied and 4 apartments (3.9%) were empty. As of 2009, the construction rate of new housing units was 0 new units per 1000 residents. The vacancy rate for the municipality, in 2010, was 0%.

The historical population is given in the following chart:

== Politics ==
In the 2007 federal election the most popular party was the SVP which received 38.69% of the vote. The next three most popular parties were the Green Party (16.8%), the FDP (11.96%) and the LPS Party (11.89%). In the federal election, a total of 96 votes were cast, and the voter turnout was 50.8%.

== Economy ==
As of 2010, Saint-Oyens had an unemployment rate of 7.8%. As of 2008, there were 20 people employed in the primary economic sector and about 11 businesses involved in this sector. 12 people were employed in the secondary sector and there were 4 businesses in this sector. 19 people were employed in the tertiary sector, with 7 businesses in this sector. There were 124 residents of the municipality who were employed in some capacity, of which females made up 41.9% of the workforce.

In 2008 the total number of full-time equivalent jobs was 37. The number of jobs in the primary sector was 12, all of which were in agriculture. The number of jobs in the secondary sector was 11 of which 8 or (72.7%) were in manufacturing and 3 (27.3%) were in construction. The number of jobs in the tertiary sector was 14. In the tertiary sector; 4 or 28.6% were in wholesale or retail sales or the repair of motor vehicles, 4 or 28.6% were in a hotel or restaurant, 3 or 21.4% were technical professionals or scientists, 2 or 14.3% were in education.

In 2000, there were 10 workers who commuted into the municipality and 91 workers who commuted away. The municipality is a net exporter of workers, with about 9.1 workers leaving the municipality for every one entering. Of the working population, 8.9% used public transportation to get to work, and 70.2% used a private car.

== Religion ==
From the 2000 census, 25 or 10.5% were Roman Catholic, while 164 or 69.2% belonged to the Swiss Reformed Church. Of the rest of the population, there were 5 members of an Orthodox church (or about 2.11% of the population). There were 6 (or about 2.53% of the population) who were Islamic. 30 (or about 12.66% of the population) belonged to no church, are agnostic or atheist, and 7 individuals (or about 2.95% of the population) did not answer the question.

== Education ==
In Saint-Oyens about 95 or (40.1%) of the population have completed non-mandatory upper secondary education, and 19 or (8.0%) have completed additional higher education (either university or a Fachhochschule). Of the 19 who completed tertiary schooling, 31.6% were Swiss men, 31.6% were Swiss women.

In the 2009/2010 school year there were a total of 44 students in the Saint-Oyens school district. In the Vaud cantonal school system, two years of non-obligatory pre-school are provided by the political districts. During the school year, the political district provided pre-school care for a total of 631 children of which 203 children (32.2%) received subsidized pre-school care. The canton's primary school program requires students to attend for four years. There were 24 students in the municipal primary school program. The obligatory lower secondary school program lasts for six years and there were 20 students in those schools.

As of 2000, there were 13 students in Saint-Oyens who came from another municipality, while 44 residents attended schools outside the municipality.
