= Marchissy =

- Municipality
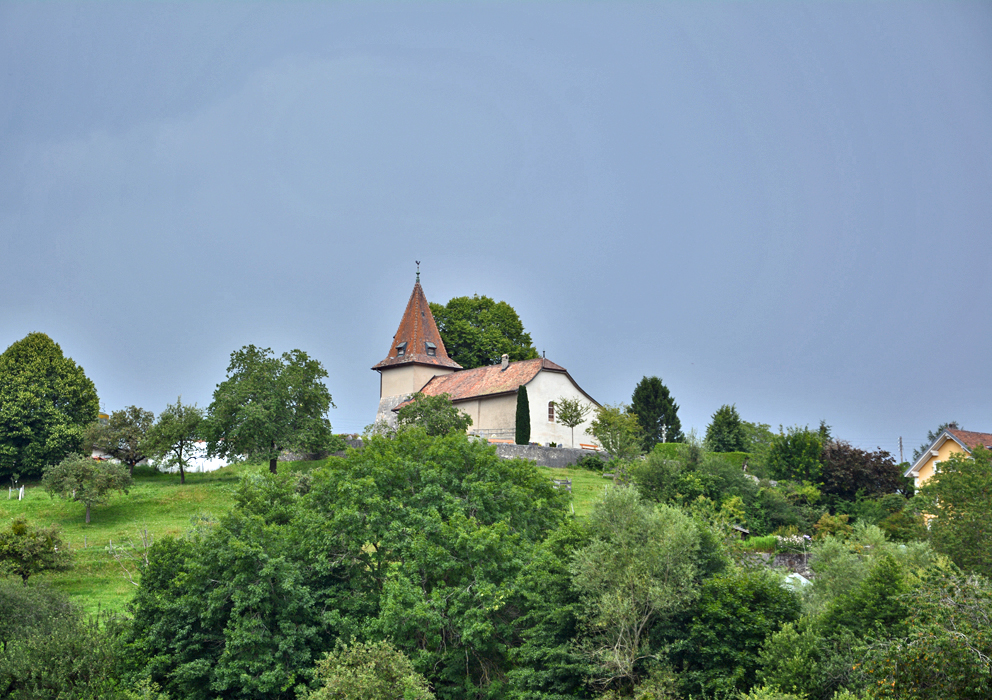
- The church

- Flag Coat of arms
- Location of Marchissy
- Location within Switzerland Location within Canton of Vaud
- Coordinates: 46°29′16″N 6°14′49″E
- Country: Switzerland
- Canton: Vaud
- District: Nyon

Government
  - Mayor: Syndic; Luc Mouthon

Area
  - Total: 11.98 km^{2} (4.63 sq mi)
- Elevation: 825 m (2,707 ft)

Population (2003)
  - Total: 347
  - Density: 29.0/km^{2} (75.0/sq mi)
- Time zone: UTC+01:00 (CET)
  - Summer (DST): UTC+02:00 (CEST)
- Postal code: 1261
- SFOS number: 5430
- ISO 3166 code: CH-VD
- Surrounded by: Bassins, Burtigny, Le Chenit, Le Vaud, Longirod
- Website: https://www.marchissy.ch Profile (in French), SFSO statistics

Marchissy (French pronunciation: [maʁʃisi]) is a municipality in the Swiss canton of Vaud. It is located in the district of Nyon.

== History ==
Marchissy is first mentioned in 1235 as Marchisie.

== Geography ==
Marchissy has an area, as of 2009, of 11.98 square kilometers (4.63 sq mi). Of this area, 3.82 km^{2} (1.47 sq mi) or 31.9% is used for agricultural purposes, while 7.76 km^{2} (3.00 sq mi) or 64.8% is forested. Of the rest of the land, 0.35 km^{2} (0.14 sq mi) or 2.9% is settled (buildings or roads), 0.01 km^{2} (2.5 acres) or 0.1% is either rivers or lakes.

Of the built up area, housing and buildings made up 1.3% and transportation infrastructure made up 1.3%. Out of the forested land, 62.3% of the total land area is heavily forested and 2.5% is covered with orchards or small clusters of trees. Of the agricultural land, 15.0% is used for growing crops and 5.3% is pastures and 11.2% is used for alpine pastures. All the water in the municipality is flowing water.

The municipality was part of the Aubonne District until it was dissolved on 31 August 2006, and Marchissy became part of the new district of Nyon.

The municipality is located at the foot of the Jura Mountains on the road to Col du Marchairuz. It consists of the haufendorf village (an irregular, unplanned and quite closely packed village, built around a central square) of Marchissy.

== Coat of arms ==
The blazon of the municipal coat of arms is Argent, on a Bend sinister vert a Lime-tree/linden tree Flower Or.

== Demographics ==
Marchissy has a population (as of December 2020) of 483. As of 2008, 14.2% of the population are resident foreign nationals. Over the last 10 years (1999–2009 ) the population has changed at a rate of 24.4%. It has changed at a rate of 20.7% due to migration and at a rate of 4.9% due to births and deaths.

Most of the population (as of 2000) speaks French (310 or 89.1%), with German being second most common (14 or 4.0%) and English being third (8 or 2.3%). There are 3 people who speak Italian and 1 person who speaks Romansh.

Of the population in the municipality 112 or about 32.2% were born in Marchissy and lived there in 2000. There were 84 or 24.1% who were born in the same canton, while 95 or 27.3% were born somewhere else in Switzerland, and 56 or 16.1% were born outside of Switzerland.

In 2008 there were 4 live births to Swiss citizens and 1 birth to non-Swiss citizens, and in same time span there were 4 deaths of Swiss citizens. Ignoring immigration and emigration, the population of Swiss citizens remained the same while the foreign population increased by 1. There were 2 Swiss men and 1 Swiss woman who emigrated from Switzerland. At the same time, there was 1 non-Swiss man who emigrated from Switzerland to another country and 2 non-Swiss women who immigrated from another country to Switzerland. The total Swiss population change in 2008 (from all sources, including moves across municipal borders) was a decrease of 10 and the non-Swiss population increased by 6 people. This represents a population growth rate of -1.0%.

The age distribution, as of 2009, in Marchissy is; 49 children or 12.3% of the population are between 0 and 9 years old and 67 teenagers or 16.8% are between 10 and 19. Of the adult population, 53 people or 13.3% of the population are between 20 and 29 years old. 55 people or 13.8% are between 30 and 39, 66 people or 16.5% are between 40 and 49, and 45 people or 11.3% are between 50 and 59. The senior population distribution is 30 people or 7.5% of the population are between 60 and 69 years old, 19 people or 4.8% are between 70 and 79, there are 13 people or 3.3% who are between 80 and 89, and there are 2 people or 0.5% who are 90 and older.

As of 2000, there were 144 people who were single and never married in the municipality. There were 170 married individuals, 19 widows or widowers and 15 individuals who are divorced.

As of 2000, there were 139 private households in the municipality, and an average of 2.5 persons per household. There were 39 households that consist of only one person and 9 households with five or more people. Out of a total of 142 households that answered this question, 27.5% were households made up of just one person. Of the rest of the households, there are 40 married couples without children, 51 married couples with children There were 6 single parents with a child or children. There were 3 households that were made up of unrelated people and 3 households that were made up of some sort of institution or another collective housing.

In 2000 there were 49 single family homes (or 52.1% of the total) out of a total of 94 inhabited buildings. There were 17 multi-family buildings (18.1%), along with 25 multi-purpose buildings that were mostly used for housing (26.6%) and 3 other use buildings (commercial or industrial) that also had some housing (3.2%). Of the single family homes 12 were built before 1919. The greatest number of single family homes (16) were built between 1981 and 1990. The most multi-family homes (8) were built between 1981 and 1990 and the next most (6) were built before 1919.

In 2000 there were 157 apartments in the municipality. The most common apartment size was 3 rooms of which there were 34. There were 5 single room apartments and 59 apartments with five or more rooms. Of these apartments, a total of 136 apartments (86.6% of the total) were permanently occupied, while 9 apartments (5.7%) were seasonally occupied and 12 apartments (7.6%) were empty. As of 2009, the construction rate of new housing units was 0 new units per 1000 residents. The vacancy rate for the municipality, in 2010, was 0%.

The historical population is given in the following chart:

== Sights ==
The entire village of Marchissy is designated as part of the Inventory of Swiss Heritage Sites.

== Politics ==
In the 2007 federal election the most popular party was the SVP which received 19.1% of the vote. The next three most popular parties were the SP (16.95%), the Green Party (14.81%) and the LPS Party (12.87%). In the federal election, a total of 110 votes were cast, and the voter turnout was 44.2%.

== Economy ==
As of 2010, Marchissy had an unemployment rate of 3%. As of 2008, there were 40 people employed in the primary economic sector and about 11 businesses involved in this sector. 19 people were employed in the secondary sector and there were 3 businesses in this sector. 6 people were employed in the tertiary sector, with 3 businesses in this sector. There were 175 residents of the municipality who were employed in some capacity, of which females made up 41.1% of the workforce.

In 2008 the total number of full-time equivalent jobs was 51. The number of jobs in the primary sector was 29, of which 21 were in agriculture and 8 were in forestry or lumber production. The number of jobs in the secondary sector was 18 of which 2 or (11.1%) were in manufacturing and 16 (88.9%) were in construction. The number of jobs in the tertiary sector was 4, of which 3 were in education.

In 2000, there were 11 workers who commuted into the municipality and 114 workers who commuted away. The municipality is a net exporter of workers, with about 10.4 workers leaving the municipality for every one entering. Of the working population, 11.4% used public transportation to get to work, and 55.4% used a private car.

== Religion ==
From the 2000 census, 90 or 25.9% were Roman Catholic, while 189 or 54.3% belonged to the Swiss Reformed Church. Of the rest of the population, there was 1 member of an Orthodox church, and there were 2 individuals (or about 0.57% of the population) who belonged to another Christian church. There was 1 individual who was Islamic. There was 1 individual who belonged to another church. 61 (or about 17.53% of the population) belonged to no church, are agnostic or atheist, and 3 individuals (or about 0.86% of the population) did not answer the question.

== Education ==
In Marchissy about 121 or (34.8%) of the population have completed non-mandatory upper secondary education, and 60 or (17.2%) have completed additional higher education (either university or a Fachhochschule). Of the 60 who completed tertiary schooling, 58.3% were Swiss men, 25.0% were Swiss women, 8.3% were non-Swiss men and 8.3% were non-Swiss women.

In the 2009/2010 school year there were a total of 55 students in the Marchissy school district. In the Vaud cantonal school system, two years of non-obligatory pre-school are provided by the political districts. During the school year, the political district provided pre-school care for a total of 1,249 children of which 563 children (45.1%) received subsidized pre-school care. The canton's primary school program requires students to attend for four years. There were 27 students in the municipal primary school program. The obligatory lower secondary school program lasts for six years and there were 27 students in those schools. There were also 1 students who were home schooled or attended another non-traditional school.

As of 2000, there was one student in Marchissy who came from another municipality, while 41 residents attended schools outside the municipality.
