= Longirod =

- Municipality
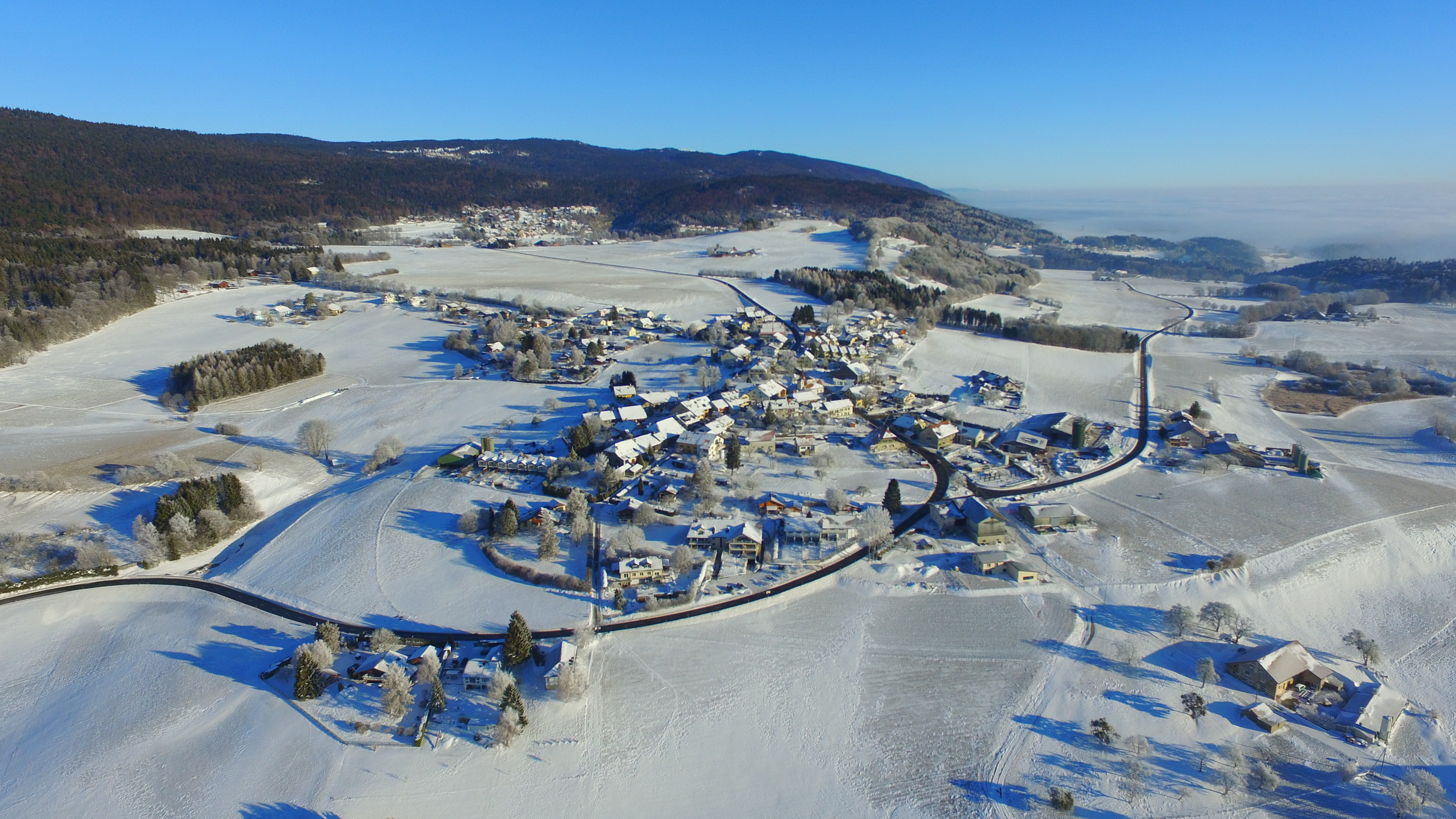
- Logirod, aerial view

- Flag Coat of arms
- Location of Longirod
- Location within Switzerland Location within Canton of Vaud
- Coordinates: 46°30′N 06°16′E
- Country: Switzerland
- Canton: Vaud
- District: Nyon

Government
  - Mayor: Syndic

Area
  - Total: 9.44 km^{2} (3.64 sq mi)
- Elevation: 899 m (2,949 ft)

Population (2008)
  - Total: 400
  - Density: 42/km^{2} (110/sq mi)
- Time zone: UTC+01:00 (CET)
  - Summer (DST): UTC+02:00 (CEST)
- Postal code: 1261
- SFOS number: 5429
- ISO 3166 code: CH-VD
- Surrounded by: Burtigny, Gimel, Le Chenit, Marchissy, Saint-George, Saint-Oyens
- Website: http://www.longirod.ch Profile (in French), SFSO statistics

Longirod (French pronunciation: [lɔ̃ʒiʁo]) is a municipality in the Swiss canton of Vaud, located in the district of Nyon.

== History ==
Longirod is first mentioned in 1267 as Longirot.

== Geography ==
Aerial view (1964)

Longirod has an area, as of 2009, of 9.44 square kilometers (3.64 sq mi). Of this area, 3.71 km^{2} (1.43 sq mi) or 39.3% is used for agricultural purposes, while 5.42 km^{2} (2.09 sq mi) or 57.4% is forested. Of the rest of the land, 0.3 km^{2} (0.12 sq mi) or 3.2% is settled (buildings or roads) and 0.03 km^{2} (7.4 acres) or 0.3% is unproductive land.

Of the built up area, housing and buildings made up 1.6% and transportation infrastructure made up 1.5%. Out of the forested land, 55.1% of the total land area is heavily forested and 2.3% is covered with orchards or small clusters of trees. Of the agricultural land, 25.5% is used for growing crops and 9.6% is pastures and 4.0% is used for alpine pastures.

The municipality was part of the Aubonne District until it was dissolved on 31 August 2006, and Longirod became part of the new district of Nyon.

The municipality is located at the foot of the Jura Mountains along the road to Col du Marchairuz. It consists of the village of Longirod and scattered individual farm houses.

== Coat of arms ==
The blazon of the municipal coat of arms is Argent, from a Mount Vert rising three Pine-trees of the same.

== Demographics ==
Longirod has a population (as of December 2020) of 495. As of 2008, 18.9% of the population are resident foreign nationals. Over the last 10 years (1999–2009 ) the population has changed at a rate of 20.2%. It has changed at a rate of 12.4% due to migration and at a rate of 8.4% due to births and deaths.

Most of the population (as of 2000) speaks French (287 or 83.4%), with German being second most common (30 or 8.7%) and English being third (16 or 4.7%). There are 5 people who speak Italian.

Of the population in the municipality 119 or about 34.6% were born in Longirod and lived there in 2000. There were 67 or 19.5% who were born in the same canton, while 102 or 29.7% were born somewhere else in Switzerland, and 49 or 14.2% were born outside of Switzerland.

In 2008 there were 7 live births to Swiss citizens and 1 birth to non-Swiss citizens, and in same time span there was 1 death of a Swiss citizen and 1 non-Swiss citizen death. Ignoring immigration and emigration, the population of Swiss citizens increased by 6 while the foreign population remained the same. There was 1 Swiss man who emigrated from Switzerland. At the same time, there was 1 non-Swiss man who immigrated from another country to Switzerland. The total Swiss population change in 2008 (from all sources, including moves across municipal borders) was an increase of 1 and the non-Swiss population increased by 12 people. This represents a population growth rate of 3.3%.

The age distribution, as of 2009, in Longirod is; 62 children or 14.5% of the population are between 0 and 9 years old and 51 teenagers or 11.9% are between 10 and 19. Of the adult population, 40 people or 9.4% of the population are between 20 and 29 years old. 63 people or 14.8% are between 30 and 39, 67 people or 15.7% are between 40 and 49, and 56 people or 13.1% are between 50 and 59. The senior population distribution is 43 people or 10.1% of the population are between 60 and 69 years old, 25 people or 5.9% are between 70 and 79, there are 14 people or 3.3% who are between 80 and 89, and there are 6 people or 1.4% who are 90 and older.

As of 2000, there were 134 people who were single and never married in the municipality. There were 180 married individuals, 17 widows or widowers and 13 individuals who are divorced.

As of 2000, there were 134 private households in the municipality, and an average of 2.5 persons per household. There were 37 households that consist of only one person and 10 households with five or more people. Out of a total of 140 households that answered this question, 26.4% were households made up of just one person. Of the rest of the households, there are 43 married couples without children, 47 married couples with children There were 5 single parents with a child or children. There were 2 households that were made up of unrelated people and 6 households that were made up of some sort of institution or another collective housing.

In 2000 there were 87 single family homes (or 67.4% of the total) out of a total of 129 inhabited buildings. There were 12 multi-family buildings (9.3%), along with 24 multi-purpose buildings that were mostly used for housing (18.6%) and 6 other use buildings (commercial or industrial) that also had some housing (4.7%). Of the single family homes 22 were built before 1919, while 8 were built between 1990 and 2000. The greatest number of single family homes (23) were built between 1981 and 1990. The most multi-family homes (5) were built before 1919 and the next most (3) were built between 1971 and 1980.

In 2000 there were 167 apartments in the municipality. The most common apartment size was 4 rooms of which there were 42. There were single room apartments and 75 apartments with five or more rooms. Of these apartments, a total of 131 apartments (78.4% of the total) were permanently occupied, while 31 apartments (18.6%) were seasonally occupied and 5 apartments (3.0%) were empty. As of 2009, the construction rate of new housing units was 0 new units per 1000 residents. The vacancy rate for the municipality, in 2010, was 0%.

The historical population is given in the following chart:

== Politics ==
In the 2007 federal election the most popular party was the SVP which received 31.03% of the vote. The next three most popular parties were the SP (18.5%), the FDP (14.5%) and the Green Party (13.65%). In the federal election, a total of 121 votes were cast, and the voter turnout was 47.1%.

== Economy ==
As of 2010, Longirod had an unemployment rate of 4.2%. As of 2008, there were 43 people employed in the primary economic sector and about 15 businesses involved in this sector. 3 people were employed in the secondary sector and there were 2 businesses in this sector. 28 people were employed in the tertiary sector, with 12 businesses in this sector. There were 176 residents of the municipality who were employed in some capacity, of which females made up 42.6% of the workforce.

In 2008 the total number of full-time equivalent jobs was 51. The number of jobs in the primary sector was 29, of which 27 were in agriculture and 2 were in forestry or lumber production. The number of jobs in the secondary sector was 2 of which 1 was in manufacturing and 1 was in construction. The number of jobs in the tertiary sector was 20. In the tertiary sector; 1 was in the sale or repair of motor vehicles, 6 or 30.0% were in a hotel or restaurant, 1 was in the information industry, 2 or 10.0% were the insurance or financial industry, 2 or 10.0% were technical professionals or scientists, 2 or 10.0% were in education.

In 2000, there were 12 workers who commuted into the municipality and 112 workers who commuted away. The municipality is a net exporter of workers, with about 9.3 workers leaving the municipality for every one entering. Of the working population, 8.5% used public transportation to get to work, and 59.1% used a private car.

== Religion ==
From the 2000 census, 66 or 19.2% were Roman Catholic, while 206 or 59.9% belonged to the Swiss Reformed Church. Of the rest of the population, there were 2 members of an Orthodox church (or about 0.58% of the population), and there were 7 individuals (or about 2.03% of the population) who belonged to another Christian church. There was 1 individual who was Islamic. 55 (or about 15.99% of the population) belonged to no church, are agnostic or atheist, and 7 individuals (or about 2.03% of the population) did not answer the question.

== Weather ==
Longirod has an average of 132.6 days of rain or snow per year and on average receives 1,285 mm (50.6 in) of precipitation. The wettest month is December during which time Longirod receives an average of 140 mm (5.5 in) of rain or snow. During this month there is precipitation for an average of 11.9 days. The month with the most days of precipitation is May, with an average of 13.1, but with only 103 mm (4.1 in) of rain or snow. The driest month of the year is July with an average of 80 mm (3.1 in) of precipitation over 9.3 days.

== Education ==
In Longirod about 128 or (37.2%) of the population have completed non-mandatory upper secondary education, and 52 or (15.1%) have completed additional higher education (either university or a Fachhochschule). Of the 52 who completed tertiary schooling, 46.2% were Swiss men, 34.6% were Swiss women, 11.5% were non-Swiss men.

In the 2009/2010 school year there were a total of 44 students in the Longirod school district. In the Vaud cantonal school system, two years of non-obligatory pre-school are provided by the political districts. During the school year, the political district provided pre-school care for a total of 1,249 children of which 563 children (45.1%) received subsidized pre-school care. The canton's primary school program requires students to attend for four years. There were 24 students in the municipal primary school program. The obligatory lower secondary school program lasts for six years and there were 19 students in those schools. There were also 1 students who were home schooled or attended another non-traditional school.

As of 2000, there were 13 students in Longirod who came from another municipality, while 53 residents attended schools outside the municipality.
