= Gimel, Switzerland =

Gimel
- Municipality
- Flag Coat of arms
- Location of Gimel
- Location within Switzerland Location within Canton of Vaud
- Coordinates: 46°31′N 06°18′E
- Country: Switzerland
- Canton: Vaud
- District: Morges

Government
  - Mayor: Syndic

Area
  - Total: 18.89 km^{2} (7.29 sq mi)
- Elevation: 730 m (2,400 ft)

Population (2003)
  - Total: 1,398
  - Density: 74.01/km^{2} (191.7/sq mi)
- Time zone: UTC+01:00 (CET)
  - Summer (DST): UTC+02:00 (CEST)
- Postal code: 1188
- SFOS number: 5428
- ISO 3166 code: CH-VD
- Surrounded by: Bière, Essertines-sur-Rolle, Le Chenit, Longirod, Montherod, Pizy, Saint-George, Saint-Oyens, Saubraz
- Twin towns: Gimel-les-Cascades (France)
- Website: www.gimel.ch

Gimel is a municipality in the Swiss the canton Vaud, located in the district of Morges.

== History ==
Gimel is first mentioned around 979-993 as Gemella.

== Geography ==
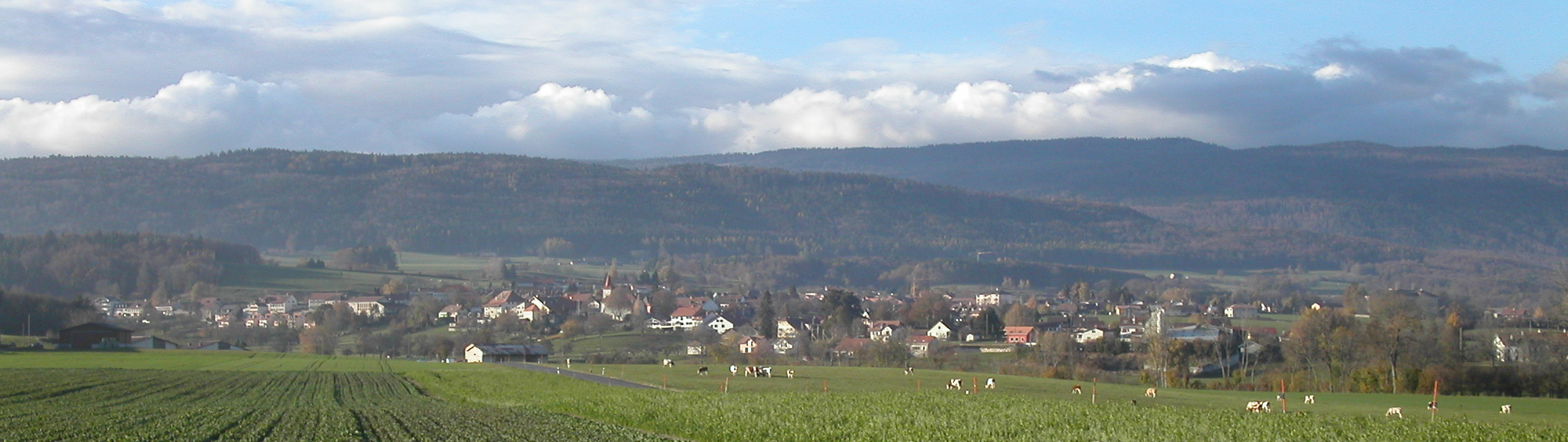
Gimel

Gimel has an area, as of 2009, of 18.89 square kilometers (7.29 sq mi). Of this area, 6.07 km^{2} (2.34 sq mi) or 32.1% is used for agricultural purposes, while 11.66 km^{2} (4.50 sq mi) or 61.7% is forested. Of the rest of the land, 1.08 km^{2} (0.42 sq mi) or 5.7% is settled (buildings or roads), 0.03 km^{2} (7.4 acres) or 0.2% is either rivers or lakes and 0.1 km^{2} (25 acres) or 0.5% is unproductive land.

Of the built up area, housing and buildings made up 2.7% and transportation infrastructure made up 2.2%. Out of the forested land, 60.4% of the total land area is heavily forested and 1.3% is covered with orchards or small clusters of trees. Of the agricultural land, 20.6% is used for growing crops and 6.7% is pastures and 4.3% is used for alpine pastures. All the water in the municipality is flowing water.

The municipality was part of the Aubonne District until it was dissolved on 31 August 2006, and Gimel became part of the new district of Morges.

The municipality is located at the foot of the Jura Mountains on the Col du Marchairuz road.

== Coat of arms ==
The blazon of the municipal coat of arms is Gules, Twins Argent. The twins on the coat of arms may represent Gemini (French: Gémeaux) and come from the name of the municipality.

== Demographics ==
Gimel has a population (as of December 2020) of 2,311. As of 2008, 19.2% of the population are resident foreign nationals. Over the last 10 years (1999–2009 ) the population has changed at a rate of 29.7%. It has changed at a rate of 31.5% due to migration and at a rate of -2% due to births and deaths.

Most of the population (as of 2000) speaks French (1,285 or 88.7%), with German being second most common (39 or 2.7%) and Italian being third (35 or 2.4%). There is 1 person who speaks Romansh.

Of the population in the municipality 418 or about 28.8% were born in Gimel and lived there in 2000. There were 473 or 32.6% who were born in the same canton, while 215 or 14.8% were born somewhere else in Switzerland, and 288 or 19.9% were born outside of Switzerland.

In 2008 there were 10 live births to Swiss citizens and 2 births to non-Swiss citizens, and in same time span there were 14 deaths of Swiss citizens and 1 non-Swiss citizen death. Ignoring immigration and emigration, the population of Swiss citizens decreased by 4 while the foreign population increased by 1. There were 3 Swiss women who emigrated from Switzerland. At the same time, there were 20 non-Swiss men and 12 non-Swiss women who immigrated from another country to Switzerland. The total Swiss population change in 2008 (from all sources, including moves across municipal borders) was an increase of 56 and the non-Swiss population increased by 39 people. This represents a population growth rate of 6.2%.

The age distribution, as of 2009, in Gimel is; 207 children or 12.2% of the population are between 0 and 9 years old and 219 teenagers or 12.9% are between 10 and 19. Of the adult population, 163 people or 9.6% of the population are between 20 and 29 years old. 269 people or 15.8% are between 30 and 39, 266 people or 15.7% are between 40 and 49, and 232 people or 13.7% are between 50 and 59. The senior population distribution is 158 people or 9.3% of the population are between 60 and 69 years old, 87 people or 5.1% are between 70 and 79, there are 76 people or 4.5% who are between 80 and 89, and there are 21 people or 1.2% who are 90 and older.

As of 2000, there were 568 people who were single and never married in the municipality. There were 690 married individuals, 109 widows or widowers and 82 individuals who are divorced.

As of 2000, there were 541 private households in the municipality, and an average of 2.5 persons per household. There were 162 households that consist of only one person and 38 households with five or more people. Out of a total of 556 households that answered this question, 29.1% were households made up of just one person and there were 2 adults who lived with their parents. Of the rest of the households, there are 143 married couples without children, 201 married couples with children There were 25 single parents with a child or children. There were 8 households that were made up of unrelated people and 15 households that were made up of some sort of institution or another collective housing.

In 2000 there were 203 single family homes (or 59.4% of the total) out of a total of 342 inhabited buildings. There were 65 multi-family buildings (19.0%), along with 49 multi-purpose buildings that were mostly used for housing (14.3%) and 25 other use buildings (commercial or industrial) that also had some housing (7.3%). Of the single family homes 42 were built before 1919, while 24 were built between 1990 and 2000. The greatest number of single family homes (51) were built between 1981 and 1990. The most multi-family homes (26) were built before 1919 and the next most (8) were built between 1961 and 1970. There were 2 multi-family houses built between 1996 and 2000.

In 2000 there were 618 apartments in the municipality. The most common apartment size was 3 rooms of which there were 179. There were 39 single room apartments and 154 apartments with five or more rooms. Of these apartments, a total of 512 apartments (82.8% of the total) were permanently occupied, while 77 apartments (12.5%) were seasonally occupied and 29 apartments (4.7%) were empty. As of 2009, the construction rate of new housing units was 9.4 new units per 1000 residents. The vacancy rate for the municipality, in 2010, was 0%.

The historical population is given in the following chart:

== Sights ==
The entire village of Gimel is designated as part of the Inventory of Swiss Heritage Sites.

== Politics ==
In the 2007 federal election the most popular party was the SVP which received 30.18% of the vote. The next three most popular parties were the FDP (16.12%), the SP (14.54%) and the LPS Party (10.22%). In the federal election, a total of 381 votes were cast, and the voter turnout was 39.7%.

== Economy ==
As of 2010, Gimel had an unemployment rate of 3.8%. As of 2008, there were 63 people employed in the primary economic sector and about 19 businesses involved in this sector. 135 people were employed in the secondary sector and there were 19 businesses in this sector. 405 people were employed in the tertiary sector, with 41 businesses in this sector. There were 713 residents of the municipality who were employed in some capacity, of which females made up 44.5% of the workforce.

In 2008 the total number of full-time equivalent jobs was 517. The number of jobs in the primary sector was 50, of which 41 were in agriculture and 9 were in forestry or lumber production. The number of jobs in the secondary sector was 131 of which 23 or (17.6%) were in manufacturing and 108 (82.4%) were in construction. The number of jobs in the tertiary sector was 336. In the tertiary sector; 32 or 9.5% were in wholesale or retail sales or the repair of motor vehicles, 71 or 21.1% were in the movement and storage of goods, 4 or 1.2% were in a hotel or restaurant, 2 or 0.6% were in the information industry, 22 or 6.5% were the insurance or financial industry, 4 or 1.2% were technical professionals or scientists, 31 or 9.2% were in education and 147 or 43.8% were in health care.

In 2000, there were 325 workers who commuted into the municipality and 408 workers who commuted away. The municipality is a net exporter of workers, with about 1.3 workers leaving the municipality for every one entering. About 13.8% of the workforce coming into Gimel are coming from outside Switzerland. Of the working population, 8.7% used public transportation to get to work, and 64.2% used a private car.

== Religion ==
From the 2000 census, 357 or 24.6% were Roman Catholic, while 724 or 50.0% belonged to the Swiss Reformed Church. Of the rest of the population, there were 21 members of an Orthodox church (or about 1.45% of the population), and there were 61 individuals (or about 4.21% of the population) who belonged to another Christian church. There were 11 (or about 0.76% of the population) who were Islamic. There were 3 individuals who belonged to another church. 172 (or about 11.87% of the population) belonged to no church, are agnostic or atheist, and 100 individuals (or about 6.90% of the population) did not answer the question.

== Education ==
In Gimel about 508 or (35.1%) of the population have completed non-mandatory upper secondary education, and 134 or (9.2%) have completed additional higher education (either university or a Fachhochschule). Of the 134 who completed tertiary schooling, 53.7% were Swiss men, 27.6% were Swiss women, 11.2% were non-Swiss men and 7.5% were non-Swiss women.

In the 2009/2010 school year there were a total of 237 students in the Gimel school district. In the Vaud cantonal school system, two years of non-obligatory pre-school are provided by the political districts. During the school year, the political district provided pre-school care for a total of 631 children of which 203 children (32.2%) received subsidized pre-school care. The canton's primary school program requires students to attend for four years. There were 135 students in the municipal primary school program. The obligatory lower secondary school program lasts for six years and there were 101 students in those schools. There were also 1 students who were home schooled or attended another non-traditional school.

As of 2000, there were 99 students in Gimel who came from another municipality, while 108 residents attended schools outside the municipality.
