= Nyon District =

Coordinates: 46°25′12″N 6°13′18″E

Nyon District District de Nyon
- District
- Country: Switzerland
- Canton: Vaud
- Capital: Nyon

Area
  - Total: 307.34 km^{2} (118.66 sq mi)

Population (2020)
  - Total: 103,305
  - Density: 336.13/km^{2} (870.56/sq mi)
- Time zone: UTC+1 (CET)
  - Summer (DST): UTC+2 (CEST)
- Municipalities: 47

Nyon District is a district in the canton of Vaud, Switzerland. The seat of the district is the city of Nyon.

== Geography ==
Nyon has an area, as of 2009, of 307.35 square kilometers (118.67 sq mi). Of this area, 129.16 km^{2} (49.87 sq mi) or 42.0% is used for agricultural purposes, while 137.52 km^{2} (53.10 sq mi) or 44.7% is forested. Of the rest of the land, 39.26 km^{2} (15.16 sq mi) or 12.8% is settled (buildings or roads) and 1.53 km^{2} (0.59 sq mi) or 0.5% is unproductive land.

== Demographics ==
Nyon has a population (as of December 2020) of 103,305.

Most of the population (as of 2000) speaks French (47,010 or 75.9%), with English being second most common (4,462 or 7.2%) and German being third (4,361 or 7.0%). There are 1,386 people who speak Italian and 33 people who speak Romansh.

Of the population in the district 11,411 or about 18.4% were born in Nyon and lived there in 2000. There were 11,760 or 19.0% who were born in the same canton, while 16,519 or 26.7% were born somewhere else in Switzerland, and 19,711 or 31.8% were born outside of Switzerland.

In 2008 there were 642 live births to Swiss citizens and 358 births to non-Swiss citizens, and in same time span there were 357 deaths of Swiss citizens and 54 non-Swiss citizen deaths. Ignoring immigration and emigration, the population of Swiss citizens increased by 285 while the foreign population increased by 304. There were 59 Swiss men and 61 Swiss women who emigrated from Switzerland. At the same time, there were 916 non-Swiss men and 863 non-Swiss women who immigrated from another country to Switzerland. The total Swiss population change in 2008 (from all sources, including moves across municipal borders) was an increase of 452 and the non-Swiss population increased by 1891 people. This represents a population growth rate of 2.8%.

The age distribution, as of 2009, in Nyon is; 10,782 children or 12.6% of the population are between 0 and 9 years old and 11,348 teenagers or 13.2% are between 10 and 19. Of the adult population, 8,922 people or 10.4% of the population are between 20 and 29 years old. 12,835 people or 14.9% are between 30 and 39, 15,361 people or 17.9% are between 40 and 49, and 10,841 people or 12.6% are between 50 and 59. The senior population distribution is 8,845 people or 10.3% of the population are between 60 and 69 years old, 4,366 people or 5.1% are between 70 and 79, there are 2,160 people or 2.5% who are 80 and 89, and there are 417 people or 0.5% who are 90 and older.

As of 2000, there were 25,813 people who were single and never married in the district. There were 30,544 married individuals, 2,171 widows or widowers and 3,446 individuals who are divorced.

There were 7,384 households that consist of only one person and 1,678 households with five or more people. Out of a total of 25,296 households that answered this question, 29.2% were households made up of just one person and there were 85 adults who lived with their parents. Of the rest of the households, there are 6,471 married couples without children, 8,806 married couples with children There were 1,606 single parents with a child or children. There were 367 households that were made up of unrelated people and 577 households that were made up of some sort of institution or another collective housing.

The historical population is given in the following chart:

== Politics ==
In the 2007 federal election the most popular party was the SVP which received 22.27% of the vote. The next three most popular parties were the SP (17.53%), the FDP (14.65%) and the Green Party (14%). In the federal election, a total of 19,858 votes were cast, and the voter turnout was 44.7%.

== Religion ==
From the 2000 census, 20,892 or 33.7% were Roman Catholic, while 20,233 or 32.6% belonged to the Swiss Reformed Church. Of the rest of the population, there were 585 members of an Orthodox church (or about 0.94% of the population), there were 73 individuals (or about 0.12% of the population) who belonged to the Christian Catholic Church, and there were 2,070 individuals (or about 3.34% of the population) who belonged to another Christian church. There were 243 individuals (or about 0.39% of the population) who were Jewish, and 1,589 (or about 2.56% of the population) who were Islamic. There were 175 individuals who were Buddhist, 178 individuals who were Hindu and 100 individuals who belonged to another church. 11,875 (or about 19.16% of the population) belonged to no church, are agnostic or atheist, and 3,961 individuals (or about 6.39% of the population) did not answer the question.

== Education ==
In Nyon about 19,956 or (32.2%) of the population have completed non-mandatory upper secondary education, and 14,052 or (22.7%) have completed additional higher education (either University or a Fachhochschule). Of the 14,052 who completed tertiary schooling, 39.2% were Swiss men, 25.3% were Swiss women, 20.1% were non-Swiss men and 15.4% were non-Swiss women.

In the 2009/2010 school year there were a total of 10,228 students in the local and district school systems. In the Vaud cantonal school system, two years of non-obligatory pre-school are provided by the political districts. During the school year, the district provided pre-school care for a total of 1,249 children. There were 563 (45.1%) children who received subsidized pre-school care. There were 5,538 students in the primary school program, which last four years. The obligatory lower secondary school program lasts for six years and there were 4,501 students in those schools. There were also 189 students who were home schooled or attended another non-traditional school.

== Municipalities ==
On 1 September 2006, the districts of Nyon were redefined and reduced in number from 19 to 10. The 47 municipalities in the new district of Nyon include all 32 of the old district of Nyon, 12 from the abolished Rolle District (all except Allaman), and three from the abolished Aubonne District (Longirod, Marchissy and Saint-George).

Municipalities of Nyon
| Name | Population (31 December 2020) | Area km^{2} | | Pre-2006 district |
|---|---|---|---|---|
| Arnex-sur-Nyon | 242 | 2 | .04 | Nyon |
| Arzier | 2,916 | 51 | .91 | Nyon |
| Bassins | 1,464 | 20 | .79 | Nyon |
| Begnins | 1,928 | 4 | .78 | Nyon |
| Bogis-Bossey | 847 | 2 | .45 | Nyon |
| Borex | 1,153 | 1 | .98 | Nyon |
| Bursinel | 492 | 1 | .77 | Rolle |
| Bursins | 779 | 3 | .37 | Rolle |
| Burtigny | 403 | 5 | .68 | Rolle |
| Chavannes-de-Bogis | 1,341 | 2 | .85 | Nyon |
| Chavannes-des-Bois | 1,002 | 2 | .14 | Nyon |
| Chéserex | 1,249 | 10 | .56 | Nyon |
| Coinsins | 509 | 2 | .91 | Nyon |
| Commugny | 3,004 | 6 | .51 | Nyon |
| Coppet | 3,280 | 1 | .87 | Nyon |
| Crans-près-Céligny | 2,336 | 4 | .32 | Nyon |
| Crassier | 1,172 | 2 | .03 | Nyon |
| Duillier | 1,131 | 4 | .11 | Nyon |
| Dully | 624 | 1 | .66 | Rolle |
| Essertines-sur-Rolle | 741 | 6 | .95 | Rolle |
| Eysins | 1,738 | 2 | .38 | Nyon |
| Founex | 3,874 | 4 | .79 | Nyon |
| Genolier | 1,989 | 4 | .87 | Nyon |
| Gilly | 1,428 | 7 | .76 | Rolle |
| Gingins | 1,252 | 12 | .58 | Nyon |
| Givrins | 1,031 | 3 | .97 | Nyon |
| Gland | 13,258 | 8 | .32 | Nyon |
| Grens | 406 | 2 | .56 | Nyon |
| La Rippe | 1,137 | 16 | .61 | Nyon |
| Le Vaud | 1,364 | 3 | .11 | Nyon |
| Longirod | 495 | 9 | .44 | Aubonne |
| Luins | 619 | 2 | .67 | Rolle |
| Marchissy | 483 | 11 | .98 | Aubonne |
| Mies | 2,165 | 3 | .45 | Nyon |
| Mont-sur-Rolle | 2,658 | 3 | .85 | Rolle |
| Nyon | 21,718 | 6 | .79 | Nyon |
| Perroy | 1,518 | 2 | .90 | Rolle |
| Prangins | 4,099 | 6 | .03 | Nyon |
| Rolle | 6,260 | 2 | .74 | Rolle |
| Saint-Cergue | 2,674 | 24 | .28 | Nyon |
| Saint-George | 1,073 | 12 | .32 | Aubonne |
| Signy-Avenex | 585 | 1 | .93 | Nyon |
| Tannay | 1,641 | 1 | .82 | Nyon |
| Tartegnin | 238 | 1 | .09 | Rolle |
| Trélex | 1,449 | 5 | .78 | Nyon |
| Vich | 1,155 | 1 | .56 | Nyon |
| Vinzel | 385 | 1 | .09 | Rolle |
| Total | 103,305 | 253 | .7 | |
