= Saint-George =

- Municipality
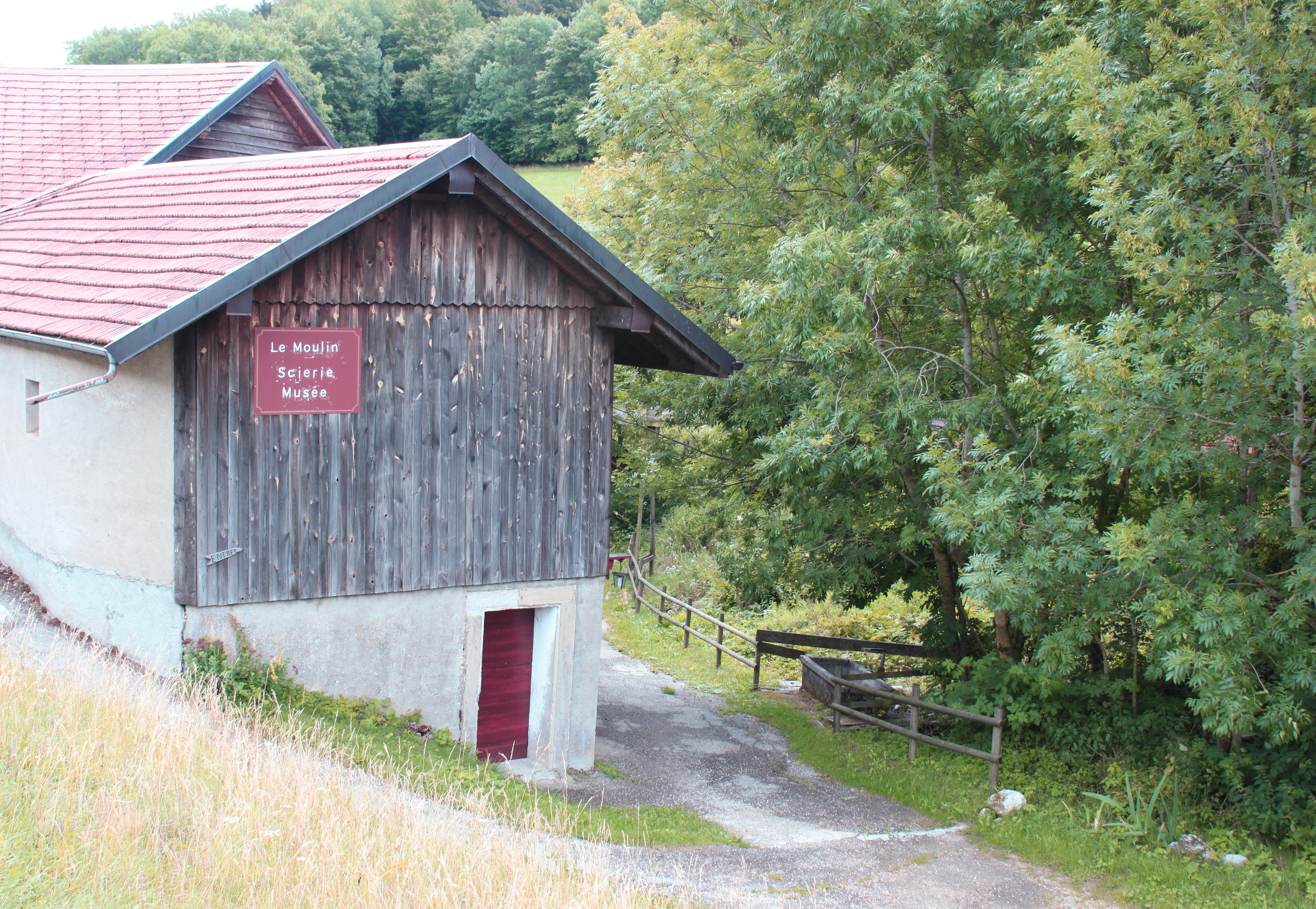

- Flag Coat of arms
- Location of Saint-George
- Location within Switzerland Location within Canton of Vaud
- Coordinates: 46°31′N 06°16′E
- Country: Switzerland
- Canton: Vaud
- District: Nyon

Government
  - Mayor: Syndic

Area
  - Total: 12.32 km^{2} (4.76 sq mi)
- Elevation: 936 m (3,071 ft)

Population (2003)
  - Total: 695
  - Density: 56.4/km^{2} (146/sq mi)
- Time zone: UTC+01:00 (CET)
  - Summer (DST): UTC+02:00 (CEST)
- Postal code: 1188
- SFOS number: 5434
- ISO 3166 code: CH-VD
- Surrounded by: Gimel, Le Chenit, Longirod
- Website: stgeorge.ch

Saint-George is a municipality in the Swiss canton of Vaud. It is located in the district of Nyon.

== History ==
Saint-George is first mentioned in 1153 as Sancti Georgii de Essartinis.

== Geography ==
Aerial view (1964)

Saint-George has an area, as of 2009, of 12.32 square kilometers (4.76 sq mi). Of this area, 2.18 km^{2} (0.84 sq mi) or 17.7% is used for agricultural purposes, while 9.42 km^{2} (3.64 sq mi) or 76.5% is forested. Of the rest of the land, 0.71 km^{2} (0.27 sq mi) or 5.8% is settled (buildings or roads) and 0.02 km^{2} (4.9 acres) or 0.2% is unproductive land.

Of the built up area, housing and buildings made up 3.7% and transportation infrastructure made up 1.8%. Out of the forested land, 74.9% of the total land area is heavily forested and 1.5% is covered with orchards or small clusters of trees. Of the agricultural land, 8.0% is used for growing crops and 4.8% is pastures and 4.8% is used for alpine pastures.

The municipality was part of the Aubonne District until it was dissolved on 31 August 2006, and Saint-George became part of the new district of Nyon.

The municipality is located along the Col du Marchairuz road.

== Coat of arms ==
The blazon of the municipal coat of arms is Gules, St. George riding a Horse all Or, haloed Argent and shielded Argent a cross Gules, killing a Dragon Sable lined Or.

== Demographics ==
Saint-George has a population (as of December 2020) of 1,073. As of 2008, 20.2% of the population are resident foreign nationals. Over the last 10 years (1999–2009 ) the population has changed at a rate of 44.9%. It has changed at a rate of 41.6% due to migration and at a rate of 3% due to births and deaths.

Most of the population (as of 2000) speaks French (535 or 86.6%), with German being second most common (43 or 7.0%) and English being third (20 or 3.2%). There are 4 people who speak Italian.

Of the population in the municipality 134 or about 21.7% were born in Saint-George and lived there in 2000. There were 164 or 26.5% who were born in the same canton, while 146 or 23.6% were born somewhere else in Switzerland, and 129 or 20.9% were born outside of Switzerland.

In 2008 there were 10 live births to Swiss citizens and 4 births to non-Swiss citizens, and in same time span there were 6 deaths of Swiss citizens. Ignoring immigration and emigration, the population of Swiss citizens increased by 4 while the foreign population increased by 4. There were 2 Swiss men who emigrated from Switzerland and 1 Swiss woman who immigrated back to Switzerland. At the same time, there were 6 non-Swiss men and 3 non-Swiss women who immigrated from another country to Switzerland. The total Swiss population change in 2008 (from all sources, including moves across municipal borders) was an increase of 4 and the non-Swiss population increased by 23 people. This represents a population growth rate of 3.3%.

The age distribution, as of 2009, in Saint-George is; 133 children or 14.5% of the population are between 0 and 9 years old and 109 teenagers or 11.9% are between 10 and 19. Of the adult population, 61 people or 6.6% of the population are between 20 and 29 years old. 131 people or 14.3% are between 30 and 39, 186 people or 20.3% are between 40 and 49, and 129 people or 14.1% are between 50 and 59. The senior population distribution is 82 people or 8.9% of the population are between 60 and 69 years old, 45 people or 4.9% are between 70 and 79, there are 35 people or 3.8% who are between 80 and 89, and there are 7 people or 0.8% who are 90 and older.

As of 2000, there were 231 people who were single and never married in the municipality. There were 297 married individuals, 40 widows or widowers and 50 individuals who are divorced.

As of 2000, there were 247 private households in the municipality, and an average of 2.3 persons per household. There were 72 households that consist of only one person and 9 households with five or more people. Out of a total of 259 households that answered this question, 27.8% were households made up of just one person and there were 2 adults who lived with their parents. Of the rest of the households, there are 83 married couples without children, 68 married couples with children There were 18 single parents with a child or children. There were 4 households that were made up of unrelated people and 12 households that were made up of some sort of institution or another collective housing.

In 2000 there were 195 single family homes (or 74.1% of the total) out of a total of 263 inhabited buildings. There were 27 multi-family buildings (10.3%), along with 23 multi-purpose buildings that were mostly used for housing (8.7%) and 18 other use buildings (commercial or industrial) that also had some housing (6.8%). Of the single family homes 27 were built before 1919, while 26 were built between 1990 and 2000. The greatest number of single family homes (51) were built between 1961 and 1970. The most multi-family homes (11) were built before 1919 and the next most (5) were built between 1971 and 1980. There was 1 multi-family house built between 1996 and 2000.

In 2000 there were 330 apartments in the municipality. The most common apartment size was 4 rooms of which there were 86. There were 13 single room apartments and 122 apartments with five or more rooms. Of these apartments, a total of 225 apartments (68.2% of the total) were permanently occupied, while 80 apartments (24.2%) were seasonally occupied and 25 apartments (7.6%) were empty. As of 2009, the construction rate of new housing units was 7.6 new units per 1000 residents. The vacancy rate for the municipality, in 2010, was 0%.

The historical population is given in the following chart:

== Heritage sites of national significance ==
The village mill is listed as a Swiss heritage site of national significance.

== Politics ==
In the 2007 federal election the most popular party was the FDP which received 16.94% of the vote. The next three most popular parties were the SP (16.67%), the SVP (15.48%) and the LPS Party (14.39%). In the federal election, a total of 226 votes were cast, and the voter turnout was 44.4%.

== Economy ==
As of 2010, Saint-George had an unemployment rate of 6%. As of 2008, there were 17 people employed in the primary economic sector and about 7 businesses involved in this sector. 22 people were employed in the secondary sector and there were 8 businesses in this sector. 87 people were employed in the tertiary sector, with 15 businesses in this sector. There were 305 residents of the municipality who were employed in some capacity, of which females made up 42.3% of the workforce.

In 2008 the total number of full-time equivalent jobs was 101. The number of jobs in the primary sector was 13, all of which were in agriculture. The number of jobs in the secondary sector was 20 of which 8 or (40.0%) were in manufacturing and 13 (65.0%) were in construction. The number of jobs in the tertiary sector was 68. In the tertiary sector; 27 or 39.7% were in wholesale or retail sales or the repair of motor vehicles, 1 was in the movement and storage of goods, 2 or 2.9% were in a hotel or restaurant, 1 was in the information industry, 5 or 7.4% were technical professionals or scientists, 6 or 8.8% were in education and 24 or 35.3% were in health care.

In 2000, there were 75 workers who commuted into the municipality and 204 workers who commuted away. The municipality is a net exporter of workers, with about 2.7 workers leaving the municipality for every one entering. About 21.3% of the workforce coming into Saint-George are coming from outside Switzerland. Of the working population, 8.2% used public transportation to get to work, and 69.5% used a private car.

== Religion ==
From the 2000 census, 129 or 20.9% were Roman Catholic, while 302 or 48.9% belonged to the Swiss Reformed Church. Of the rest of the population, there were 7 members of an Orthodox church (or about 1.13% of the population), there were 2 individuals (or about 0.32% of the population) who belonged to the Christian Catholic Church, and there were 27 individuals (or about 4.37% of the population) who belonged to another Christian church. There were 3 individuals (or about 0.49% of the population) who were Jewish, and 1 individual who was Islamic. There were 5 individuals who were Buddhist and 1 individual who belonged to another church. 111 (or about 17.96% of the population) belonged to no church, are agnostic or atheist, and 30 individuals (or about 4.85% of the population) did not answer the question.

== Education ==
In Saint-George about 224 or (36.2%) of the population have completed non-mandatory upper secondary education, and 90 or (14.6%) have completed additional higher education (either university or a Fachhochschule). Of the 90 who completed tertiary schooling, 47.8% were Swiss men, 25.6% were Swiss women, 16.7% were non-Swiss men and 10.0% were non-Swiss women.

In the 2009/2010 school year there were a total of 132 students in the Saint-George school district. In the Vaud cantonal school system, two years of non-obligatory pre-school are provided by the political districts. During the school year, the political district provided pre-school care for a total of 1,249 children of which 563 children (45.1%) received subsidized pre-school care. The canton's primary school program requires students to attend for four years. There were 72 students in the municipal primary school program. The obligatory lower secondary school program lasts for six years and there were 60 students in those schools.

As of 2000, there were 9 students in Saint-George who came from another municipality, while 72 residents attended schools outside the municipality.
