= Le Vaud =

- Municipality
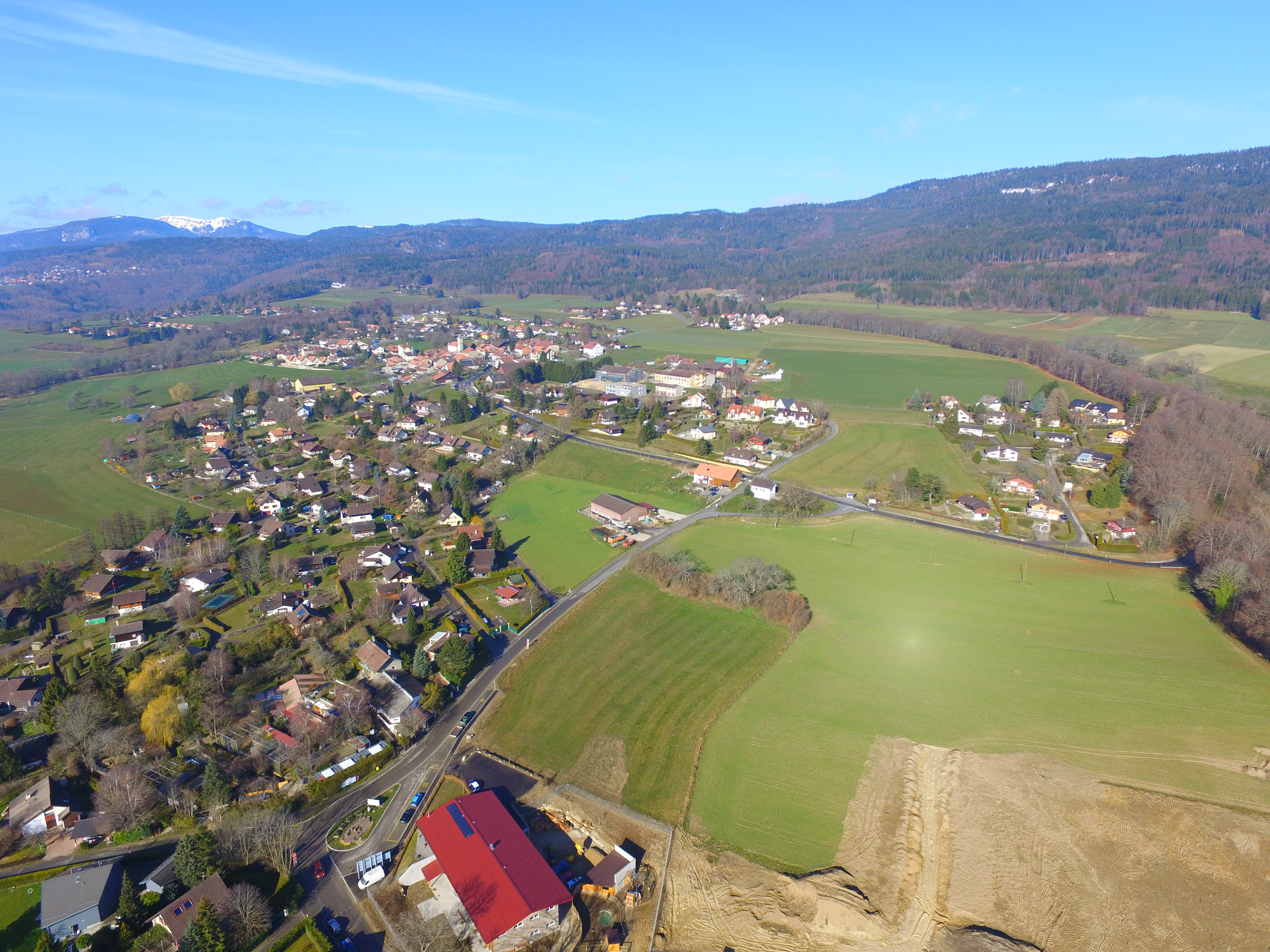

- Flag Coat of arms
- Location of Le Vaud
- Location within Switzerland Location within Canton of Vaud
- Coordinates: 46°28′N 06°14′E
- Country: Switzerland
- Canton: Vaud
- District: Nyon

Government
  - Mayor: Syndique; Chantal Landeiro

Area
  - Total: 3.1 km^{2} (1.2 sq mi)
- Elevation: 817 m (2,680 ft)

Population (2004)
  - Total: 1,034
  - Density: 330/km^{2} (860/sq mi)
- Time zone: UTC+01:00 (CET)
  - Summer (DST): UTC+02:00 (CEST)
- Postal code: 1261
- SFOS number: 5731
- ISO 3166 code: CH-VD
- Surrounded by: Bassins, Begnins, Burtigny, Marchissy
- Website: www.levaud.ch

Le Vaud (French pronunciation: [lə vo]) is a municipality in the district of Nyon in the canton of Vaud, Switzerland.

== Geography ==
Le Vaud has an area, as of 2009, of 3.1 square kilometers (1.2 mi^{2}). Of this area, 1.58 km^{2} (0.61 mi^{2}) or 50.8% is used for agricultural purposes, while 0.92 km^{2} (0.36 mi^{2}) or 29.6% is forested. Of the rest of the land, 0.61 km^{2} (0.24 mi^{2}) or 19.6% is settled (buildings or roads) and 0.01 km^{2} (2.5 acres) or 0.3% is unproductive land.

Of the built up area, housing and buildings made up 14.1% and transportation infrastructure made up 3.2%. Power and water infrastructure as well as other special developed areas made up 1.6% of the area Out of the forested land, 27.3% of the total land area is heavily forested and 2.3% is covered with orchards or small clusters of trees. Of the agricultural land, 27.3% is used for growing crops and 20.3% is pastures and 2.6% is used for alpine pastures.

The municipality was part of the Nyon District until it was dissolved on 31 August 2006, and Le Vaud became part of the new district of Nyon.

== Coat of arms ==
The blazon of the municipal coat of arms is Gules, a Shovel upright Argent crossed with two Keys in saltire of the same.

== Demographics ==
Le Vaud has a population (as of December 2020) of 1,364. As of 2008, 17.4% of the population are resident foreign nationals. Over the last 10 years (1999–2009 ) the population has changed at a rate of 24.8%. It has changed at a rate of 15.4% due to migration and at a rate of 9.2% due to births and deaths.

Most of the population (as of 2000) speaks French (754 or 80.0%), with English being second most common (77 or 8.2%) and German being third (71 or 7.5%). There are 7 people who speak Italian.

The age distribution, as of 2009, in Le Vaud is; 189 children or 15.9% of the population are between 0 and 9 years old and 165 teenagers or 13.9% are between 10 and 19. Of the adult population, 94 people or 7.9% of the population are between 20 and 29 years old. 165 people or 13.9% are between 30 and 39, 219 people or 18.5% are between 40 and 49, and 170 people or 14.3% are between 50 and 59. The senior population distribution is 101 people or 8.5% of the population are between 60 and 69 years old, 46 people or 3.9% are between 70 and 79, there are 31 people or 2.6% who are between 80 and 89, and there are 5 people or 0.4% who are 90 and older.

As of 2000, there were 383 people who were single and never married in the municipality. There were 493 married individuals, 26 widows or widowers and 40 individuals who are divorced.

As of 2000, there were 357 private households in the municipality, and an average of 2.6 persons per household. There were 77 households that consist of only one person and 31 households with five or more people. Out of a total of 366 households that answered this question, 21.0% were households made up of just one person and there were 2 adults who lived with their parents. Of the rest of the households, there are 124 married couples without children, 132 married couples with children There were 20 single parents with a child or children. There were 2 households that were made up of unrelated people and 9 households that were made up of some sort of institution or another collective housing.

In 2000 there were 283 single family homes (or 79.3% of the total) out of a total of 357 inhabited buildings. There were 27 multi-family buildings (7.6%), along with 35 multi-purpose buildings that were mostly used for housing (9.8%) and 12 other use buildings (commercial or industrial) that also had some housing (3.4%).

In 2000, a total of 346 apartments (79.4% of the total) were permanently occupied, while 75 apartments (17.2%) were seasonally occupied and 15 apartments (3.4%) were empty. As of 2009, the construction rate of new housing units was 12.6 new units per 1000 residents. The vacancy rate for the municipality, in 2010, was 0%.

The historical population is given in the following chart:

== Politics ==
In the 2007 federal election the most popular party was the LPS Party which received 19.54% of the vote. The next three most popular parties were the SVP (19.16%), the Green Party (18.87%) and the SP (16.9%). In the federal election, a total of 355 votes were cast, and the voter turnout was 52.0%.

== Economy ==
As of 2010, Le Vaud had an unemployment rate of 4.1%. As of 2008, there were 28 people employed in the primary economic sector and about 10 businesses involved in this sector. 21 people were employed in the secondary sector and there were 11 businesses in this sector. 93 people were employed in the tertiary sector, with 26 businesses in this sector. There were 458 residents of the municipality who were employed in some capacity, of which females made up 40.8% of the workforce.

In 2008 the total number of full-time equivalent jobs was 108. The number of jobs in the primary sector was 16, of which 15 were in agriculture and 1 was in forestry or lumber production. The number of jobs in the secondary sector was 19 of which 8 or (42.1%) were in manufacturing and 9 (47.4%) were in construction. The number of jobs in the tertiary sector was 73. In the tertiary sector; 8 or 11.0% were in wholesale or retail sales or the repair of motor vehicles, 17 or 23.3% were in the movement and storage of goods, 2 or 2.7% were in the information industry, 1 was the insurance or financial industry, 6 or 8.2% were technical professionals or scientists, 7 or 9.6% were in education.

In 2000, there were 37 workers who commuted into the municipality and 365 workers who commuted away. The municipality is a net exporter of workers, with about 9.9 workers leaving the municipality for every one entering. Of the working population, 10.9% used public transportation to get to work, and 74.2% used a private car.

== Religion ==
From the 2000 census, 266 or 28.2% were Roman Catholic, while 373 or 39.6% belonged to the Swiss Reformed Church. Of the rest of the population, there were 14 members of an Orthodox church (or about 1.49% of the population), there was 1 individual who belongs to the Christian Catholic Church, and there were 57 individuals (or about 6.05% of the population) who belonged to another Christian church. There were 3 (or about 0.32% of the population) who were Islamic. There was 1 person who was Buddhist and 1 individual who belonged to another church. 207 (or about 21.97% of the population) belonged to no church, are agnostic or atheist, and 45 individuals (or about 4.78% of the population) did not answer the question.

== Tourism ==
The Zoo de la Garenne is located in Le Vaud.

== Education ==
In Le Vaud about 303 or (32.2%) of the population have completed non-mandatory upper secondary education, and 215 or (22.8%) have completed additional higher education (either university or a Fachhochschule). Of the 215 who completed tertiary schooling, 47.4% were Swiss men, 24.7% were Swiss women, 14.4% were non-Swiss men and 13.5% were non-Swiss women.

In the 2009/2010 school year there were a total of 198 students in the Le Vaud school district. In the Vaud cantonal school system, two years of non-obligatory pre-school are provided by the political districts. During the school year, the political district provided pre-school care for a total of 1,249 children of which 563 children (45.1%) received subsidized pre-school care. The canton's primary school program requires students to attend for four years. There were 123 students in the municipal primary school program. The obligatory lower secondary school program lasts for six years and there were 71 students in those schools. There were also 4 students who were home schooled or attended another non-traditional school.

As of 2000, there were 9 students in Le Vaud who came from another municipality, while 133 residents attended schools outside the municipality.
