= Aubonne District =

Coordinates: 46°29′43″N 6°23′31″E

Aubonne District District d'Aubonne
- District
- Flag Coat of arms

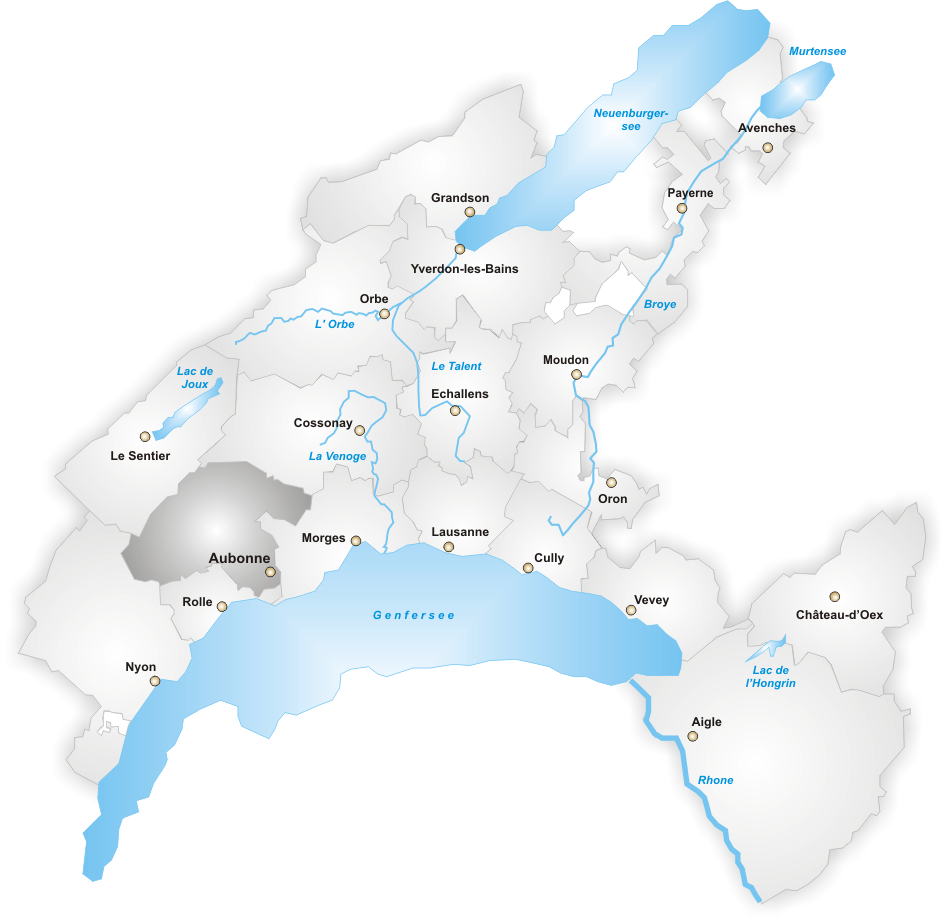
- Country: Switzerland
- Canton: Vaud
- Capital: Aubonne

Area
  - Total: 153.33 km^{2} (59.20 sq mi)

Population (2006)
  - Total: 11,882
  - Density: 77.493/km^{2} (200.71/sq mi)
- Time zone: UTC+1 (CET)
  - Summer (DST): UTC+2 (CEST)
- Municipalities: 17

Aubonne District was a former district of the canton of Vaud in Switzerland. The seat of the district was the town of Aubonne until January 1, 2008. The municipalities are now part of the district of Morges, except Longirod, Marchissy and Saint-George which are now part of the district of Nyon.

The following municipalities were located in the district:

- Apples
- Aubonne
- Ballens
- Berolle
- Bière
- Bougy-Villars
- Féchy
- Gimel
- Longirod
- Marchissy
- Mollens
- Montherod
- Pizy
- Saubraz
- Saint-George
- Saint-Livres
- Saint-Oyens
