= Begnins =

- Municipality
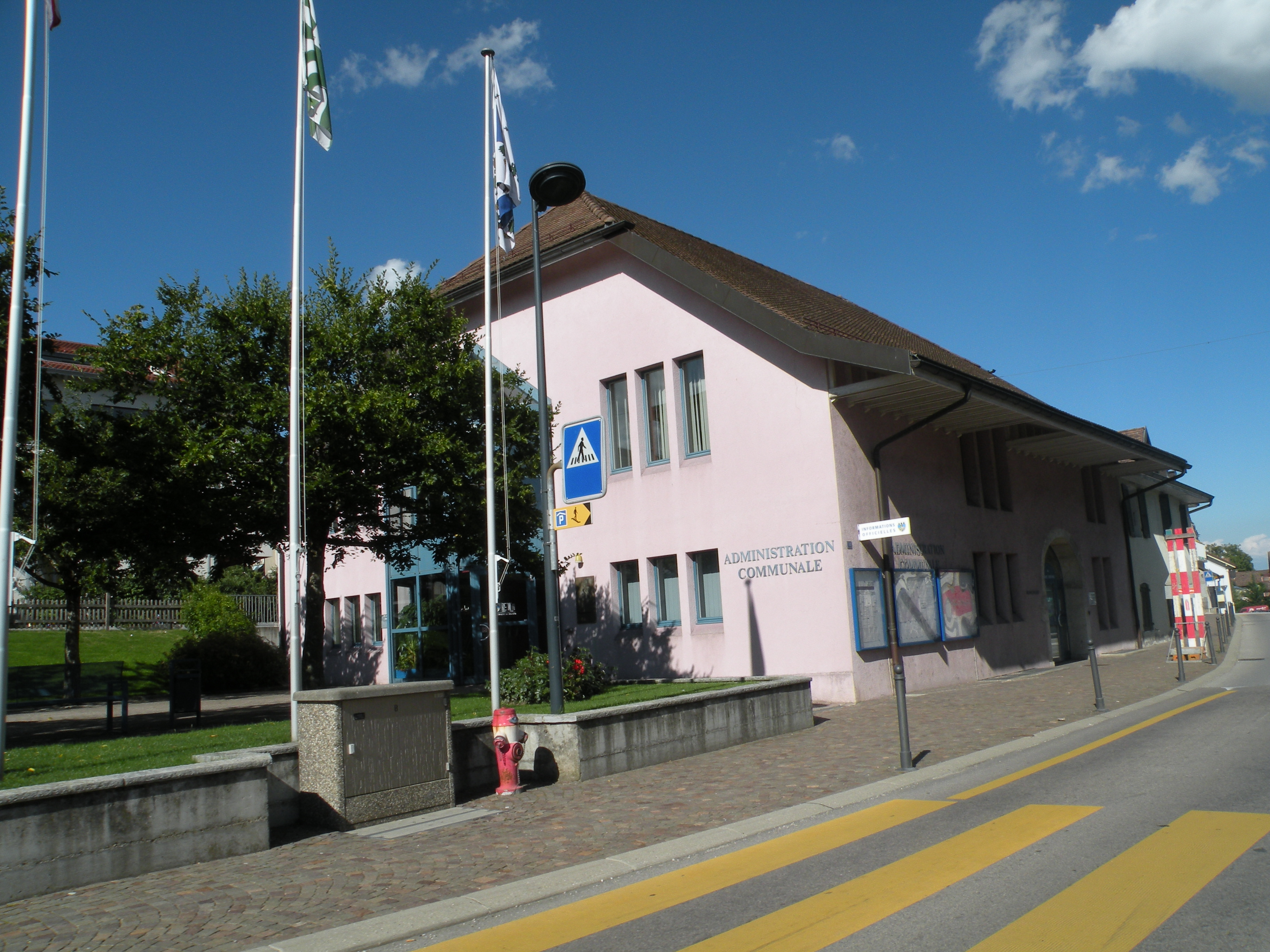
- Begnins village administration building
- Location of Begnins
- Location within Switzerland Location within Canton of Vaud
- Coordinates: 46°26′N 6°15′E
- Country: Switzerland
- Canton: Vaud
- District: Nyon

Government
  - Mayor: Syndic; Robin Chytil

Area
  - Total: 4.76 km^{2} (1.84 sq mi)
- Elevation: 541 m (1,775 ft)

Population (2025)
  - Total: 2,047
  - Density: 430/km^{2} (1,110/sq mi)
- Time zone: UTC+01:00 (CET)
  - Summer (DST): UTC+02:00 (CEST)
- Postal code: 1268
- SFOS number: 5704
- ISO 3166 code: CH-VD
- Surrounded by: Bassins, Burtigny, Gland, Le Vaud, Luins, Vich
- Website: www.begnins.ch

Begnins (French pronunciation: [bəɲɛ̃]) is a municipality in the district of Nyon in the canton of Vaud in Switzerland. It belongs to the wine-producing area of La Côte.

== History ==
Begnins was first mentioned in 1145.

== Geography ==
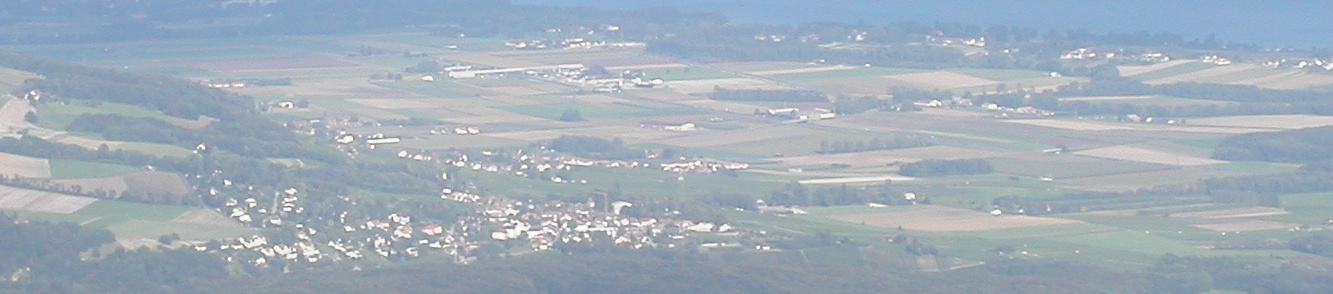
Begnins (left front) seen from La Barillette

Begnins has an area, as of 2009, of 4.8 square kilometers (1.9 mi^{2}). Of this area, 3.29 km^{2} (1.27 mi^{2}) or 68.8% is used for agricultural purposes, while 0.82 km^{2} (0.32 mi^{2}) or 17.2% is forested. Of the rest of the land, 0.67 km^{2} (0.26 mi^{2}) or 14.0% is settled (buildings or roads) and 0.01 km^{2} (2.5 acres) or 0.2% is unproductive land.

Of the built up area, housing and buildings made up 9.4% and transportation infrastructure made up 3.8%. Out of the forested land, 15.7% of the total land area is heavily forested and 1.5% is covered with orchards or small clusters of trees. Of the agricultural land, 38.9% is used for growing crops and 6.9% is pastures, while 23.0% is used for orchards or vine crops.

The municipality was part of the Nyon District until it was dissolved on 31 August 2006, and Begnins became part of the new district of Nyon.

The municipality is located in the western part of the wine-growing region of La Côte. It is situated above the medieval town of Nyon between Lake Geneva (Lac Leman) and the Jura Mountains, near the cities of Geneva and Lausanne.

== Coat of arms ==
The blazon of the municipal coat of arms is Argent, on a bar Azure a garb Or, in chief three pine-trees Vert, in base three vines proper leaved Vert and fruited Or.

== Demographics ==
Aerial view (1964)

Begnins has a population (as of December 2020) of 1,928. As of 2008, 23.3% of the population are resident foreign nationals. Over the last 10 years (1999–2009 ) the population has changed at a rate of 27.2%. It has changed at a rate of 24.9% due to migration and at a rate of 1.9% due to births and deaths.

Most of the population (as of 2000) speaks French (1,086 or 81.3%), with German being second most common (95 or 7.1%) and English being third (61 or 4.6%). There were at the time 25 people speaking Italian.

The age distribution, as of 2009, in Begnins is; 219 children or 13.4% of the population are between 0 and 9 years old and 170 teenagers or 10.4% are between 10 and 19. Of the adult population, 139 people or 8.5% of the population are between 20 and 29 years old. 278 people or 17.0% are between 30 and 39, 276 people or 16.8% are between 40 and 49, and 217 people or 13.2% are between 50 and 59. The senior population distribution is 182 people or 11.1% of the population are between 60 and 69 years old, 87 people or 5.3% are between 70 and 79, there are 51 people or 3.1% who are between 80 and 89, and there are 21 people or 1.3% who are 90 and older.

As of 2000, there were 503 people who were single and never married in the municipality. There were 662 married individuals, 94 widows or widowers and 76 individuals who are divorced.

As of 2000, there were 568 private households in the municipality, and an average of 2.3 persons per household. There were 200 households that consist of only one person and 30 households with five or more people. Out of a total of 585 households that answered this question, 34.2% were households made up of just one person. Of the rest of the households, there are 158 married couples without children, 173 married couples with children There were 27 single parents with a child or children. There were 10 households that were made up of unrelated people and 17 households that were made up of some sort of institution or another collective housing.

In 2000 there were 183 single family homes (or 53.2% of the total) out of a total of 344 inhabited buildings. There were 87 multi-family buildings (25.3%), along with 50 multi-purpose buildings that were mostly used for housing (14.5%) and 24 other use buildings (commercial or industrial) that also had some housing (7.0%).

In 2000, 539 apartments (77.6% of the total) were permanently occupied, while 142 apartments (20.4%) were seasonally occupied and 14 apartments (2.0%) were empty. As of 2009, the construction rate of new housing units was 7.2 new units per 1000 residents. The vacancy rate for the municipality, in 2010, was 0%.

The historical population is given in the following chart:

== Sights ==
The entire village of Begnins is designated as part of the Inventory of Swiss Heritage Sites.

Begnins is crossed by the "Toblerone line".

== Notable residents ==
Begnins was home to Phil Collins, of the band Genesis and the multiple Formula 1 Grand Prix World Champion Sir Jackie Stewart. It was also once home to racing driver and Formula 1 champion Jochen Rindt.

Jean-Luc Godard and Anne Wiazemsky married in Begnins.

== Politics ==
In the 2007 federal election the most popular party was the Swiss People's Party which received 25.55% of the vote. The next three most popular parties were the Social Democratic Party of Switzerland (17.68%), the FDP.The Liberals (13.97%) and the Green Party (13.37%). In the federal election, a total of 436 votes were cast, and the voter turnout was 48.6%.

== Economy ==
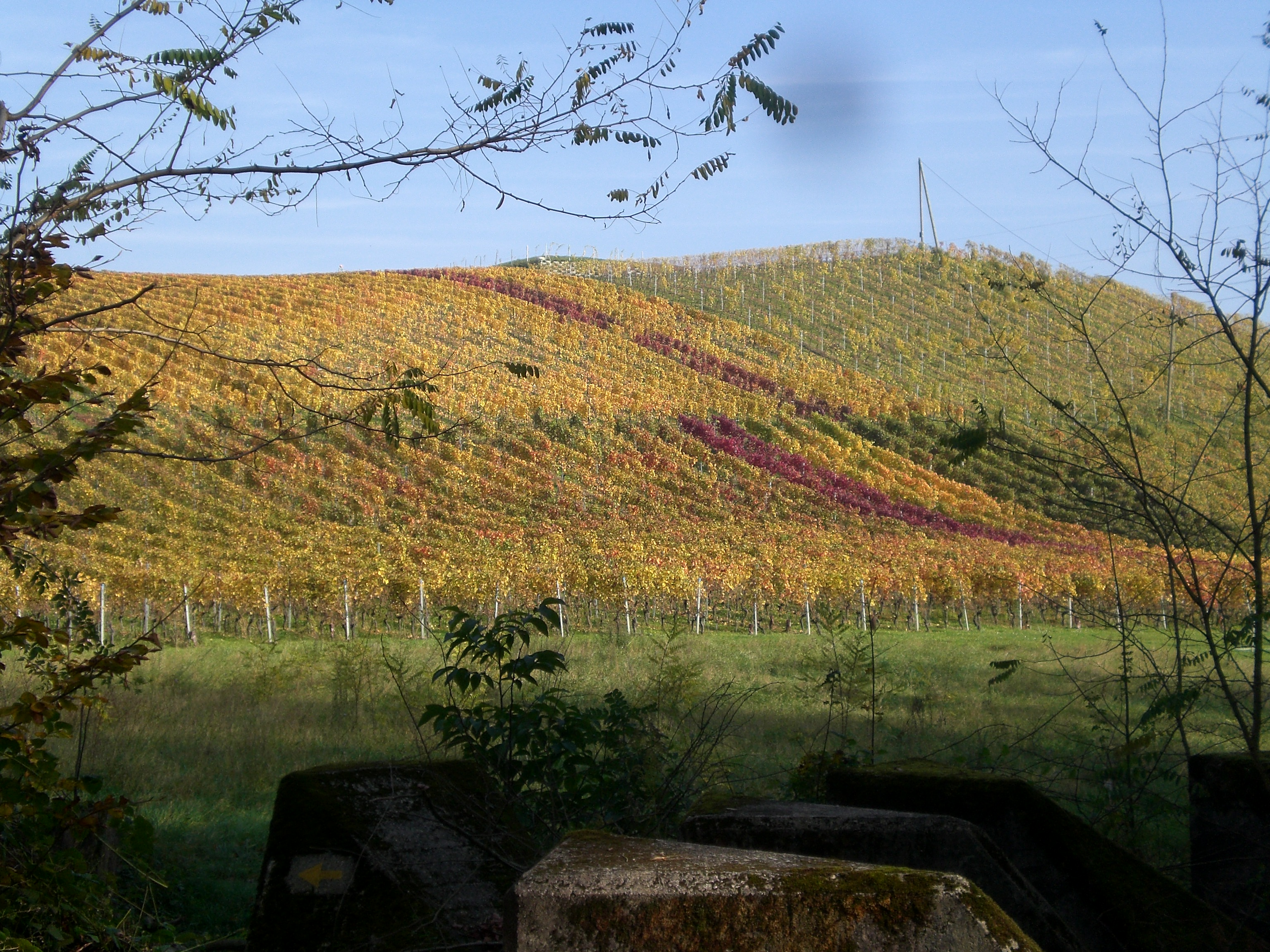
Vineyards outside Begnins

As of 2010, Begnins had an unemployment rate of 4.1%. As of 2008, there were 96 people employed in the primary economic sector and about 17 businesses involved in this sector. 38 people were employed in the secondary sector and there were 14 businesses in this sector. 259 people were employed in the tertiary sector, with 45 businesses in this sector. There were 661 residents of the municipality who were employed in some capacity, of which females made up 44.2% of the workforce.

In 2008 there were 303 full-time equivalent jobs. There were 58 jobs in the primary sector, all of which were in agriculture. There were 33 jobs in the secondary sector, of which 10 or (30.3%) were in manufacturing and 23 (69.7%) were in construction. There were 212 jobs in the tertiary sector was 212. In the tertiary sector; 29 or 13.7% were in wholesale or retail sales or the repair of motor vehicles, 6 or 2.8% were in the movement and storage of goods, 20 or 9.4% were in a hotel or restaurant, 4 or 1.9% were in the information industry, 2 or 0.9% were the insurance or financial industry, 12 or 5.7% were technical professionals or scientists, 44 or 20.8% were in education and 77 or 36.3% were in health care.

In 2000, 214 workers commuted into the municipality and 489 workers commuted away. The municipality is a net exporter of workers, with about 2.3 workers leaving the municipality for every one entering. About 15.4% of the workforce coming into Begnins are coming from outside Switzerland. Of the working population, 12.6% used public transportation to get to work, and 64.6% used a private car.

== Religion ==
From the 2000 census, 381 or 28.5% were Roman Catholic, while 577 or 43.2% belonged to the Swiss Reformed Church. Of the rest of the population, there were 11 members of an Orthodox church (or about 0.82% of the population), there was 1 individual who belongs to the Christian Catholic Church, and there were 64 individuals (or about 4.79% of the population) who belonged to another Christian church. There were 4 individuals (or about 0.30% of the population) who were Jewish, and 57 (or about 4.27% of the population) who were Islamic. There was 1 person who was Buddhist and 1 person who was Hindu. 196 (or about 14.68% of the population) belonged to no church, are agnostic or atheist, and 70 individuals (or about 5.24% of the population) did not answer the question.

== Education ==
In Begnins about 432 or (32.4%) of the population have completed non-mandatory upper secondary education, and 284 or (21.3%) have completed additional higher education (either university or a Fachhochschule). Of the 284 who completed tertiary schooling, 40.1% were Swiss men, 32.4% were Swiss women, 16.9% were non-Swiss men and 10.6% were non-Swiss women.

In the 2009/2010 school year there were a 174 students in the Begnins school district. In the Vaud cantonal school system, two years of non-obligatory pre-school are provided by the political districts. During the school year, the political district provided pre-school care for 1,249 children of which 563 children (45.1%) received subsidized pre-school care. The canton's primary school program requires students to attend for four years. There were 97 students in the municipal primary school program. The obligatory lower secondary school program lasts for six years and there were 76 students in those schools. One student who was home schooled or attended another non-traditional school.

As of 2000, there were 248 students in Begnins who came from another municipality, while 90 residents attended schools outside the municipality.
