= Burtigny =

- Municipality
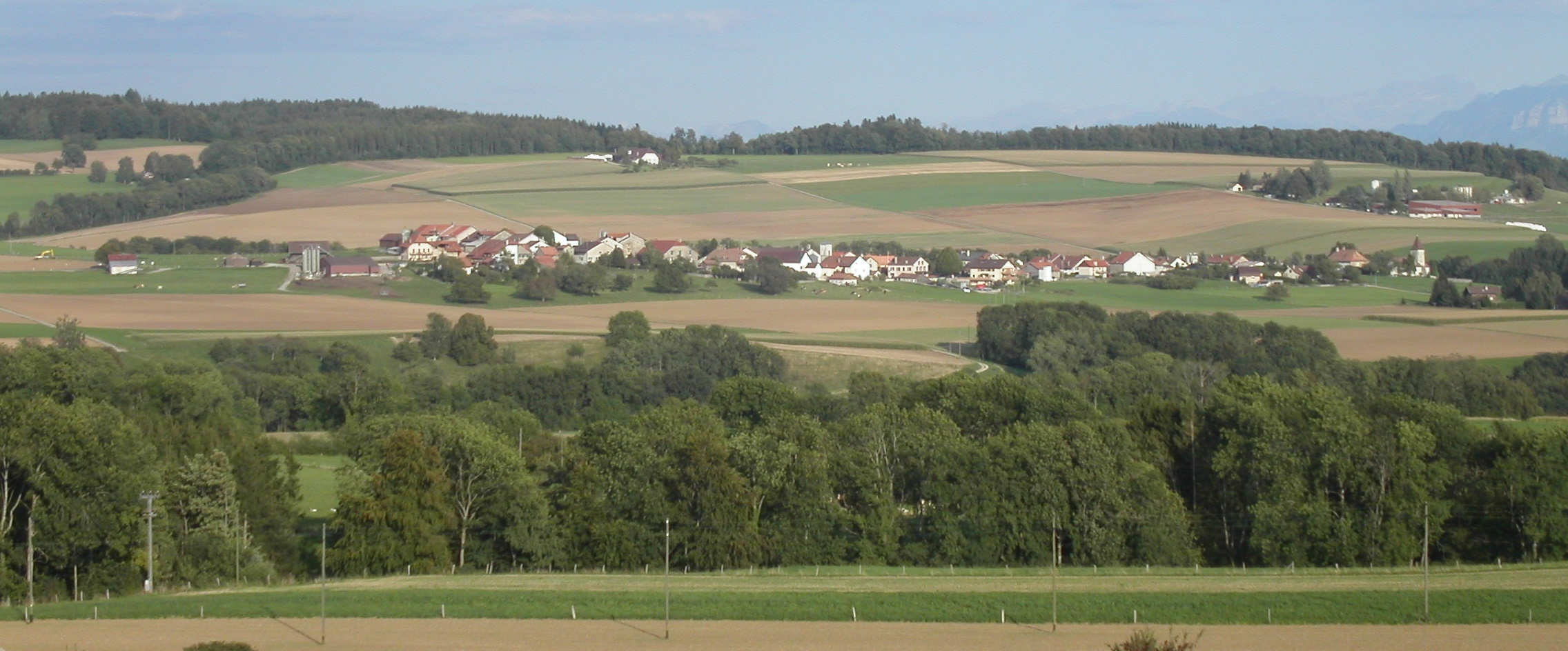
- Burtigny village

- Flag Coat of arms
- Location of Burtigny
- Location within Switzerland Location within Canton of Vaud
- Coordinates: 46°28′N 06°15′E
- Country: Switzerland
- Canton: Vaud
- District: Nyon

Government
  - Mayor: Syndic; Marlyse Sergy

Area
  - Total: 5.69 km^{2} (2.20 sq mi)
- Elevation: 734 m (2,408 ft)
- Highest elevation: 896 m (2,940 ft)
- Lowest elevation: 630 m (2,070 ft)

Population (2004)
  - Total: 287
  - Density: 50.4/km^{2} (131/sq mi)
- Demonym(s): Les Burtigniérans; Les Matagasses
- Time zone: UTC+01:00 (CET)
  - Summer (DST): UTC+02:00 (CEST)
- Postal code: 1268
- SFOS number: 5854
- ISO 3166 code: CH-VD
- Surrounded by: Marchissy, Longirod, Saint-Oyens, Essertines-sur-Rolle, Gilly, Bursins, Vinzel, Luins, Begnins, Le Vaud
- Website: www.burtigny.ch

Burtigny (French pronunciation: [byʁtiɲi]) is a municipality in the district of Nyon in the canton of Vaud in Switzerland.

== History ==
Burtigny is first mentioned in 1144 as Britiniaco. In 1145 it was mentioned as Brettignei.

== Geography ==
Burtigny has an area, as of 2009, of 5.7 square kilometers (2.2 mi^{2}). Of this area, 3.3 km^{2} (1.3 mi^{2}) or 58.1% is used for agricultural purposes, while 1.93 km^{2} (0.75 mi^{2}) or 34.0% is forested. Of the rest of the land, 0.34 km^{2} (0.13 mi^{2}) or 6.0% is settled (buildings or roads) and 0.09 km^{2} (22 acres) or 1.6% is unproductive land.

Of the built up area, housing and buildings made up 2.8% and transportation infrastructure made up 3.2%. Out of the forested land, 32.6% of the total land area is heavily forested and 1.4% is covered with orchards or small clusters of trees. Of the agricultural land, 46.0% is used for growing crops and 12.0% is pastures.

The municipality was part of the Rolle District until it was dissolved on 31 August 2006, and Burtigny became part of the new district of Nyon.

The municipality is located at the foot of the Jura Mountains along the Col du Marchairuz road. It consists of the linear village of Burtigny.

== Coat of arms ==
The blazon of the municipal coat of arms is Vert, a wavy chevron inverted Argent, a shrike proper.

== Demographics ==
Burtigny has a population (as of December 2020) of 403. As of 2008, 22.7% of the population are resident foreign nationals. Over the last 10 years (1999–2009 ) the population has changed at a rate of 6.5%. It has changed at a rate of 2.6% due to migration and at a rate of 4.2% due to births and deaths.

Most of the population (as of 2000) speaks French (259 or 83.3%), with German being second most common (22 or 7.1%) and English being third (17 or 5.5%). There are 2 people who speak Italian.

The age distribution, as of 2009, in Burtigny is; 40 children or 12.3% of the population are between 0 and 9 years old and 34 teenagers or 10.4% are between 10 and 19. Of the adult population, 38 people or 11.7% of the population are between 20 and 29 years old. 58 people or 17.8% are between 30 and 39, 47 people or 14.4% are between 40 and 49, and 40 people or 12.3% are between 50 and 59. The senior population distribution is 44 people or 13.5% of the population are between 60 and 69 years old, 17 people or 5.2% are between 70 and 79, there are 8 people or 2.5% who are between 80 and 89.

As of 2000, there were 138 people who were single and never married in the municipality. There were 148 married individuals, 16 widows or widowers and 9 individuals who are divorced.

As of 2000, there were 104 private households in the municipality, and an average of 2.7 persons per household. There were 17 households that consist of only one person and 9 households with five or more people. Out of a total of 113 households that answered this question, 15.0% were households made up of just one person and there were 5 adults who lived with their parents. Of the rest of the households, there are 14 married couples without children, 38 married couples with children There were 23 single parents with a child or children. There were 7 households that were made up of unrelated people and 9 households that were made up of some sort of institution or another collective housing.

In 2000 there were 41 single family homes (or 49.4% of the total) out of a total of 83 inhabited buildings. There were 10 multi-family buildings (12.0%), along with 27 multi-purpose buildings that were mostly used for housing (32.5%) and 5 other use buildings (commercial or industrial) that also had some housing (6.0%).

In 2000, a total of 104 apartments (79.4% of the total) were permanently occupied, while 23 apartments (17.6%) were seasonally occupied and 4 apartments (3.1%) were empty. As of 2009, the construction rate of new housing units was 0 new units per 1000 residents. The vacancy rate for the municipality, in 2010, was 0%.

The historical population is given in the following chart:

== Sights ==
The entire village of Burtigny is designated as part of the Inventory of Swiss Heritage Sites.

== Politics ==
In the 2007 federal election the most popular party was the SVP which received 38.1% of the vote. The next three most popular parties were the Green Party (13.56%), the FDP (13.19%) and the SP (11.16%). In the federal election, a total of 91 votes were cast, and the voter turnout was 44.6%.

== Economy ==
As of 2010, Burtigny had an unemployment rate of 4.7%. As of 2008, there were 28 people employed in the primary economic sector and about 12 businesses involved in this sector. 15 people were employed in the secondary sector and there were 5 businesses in this sector. 20 people were employed in the tertiary sector, with 9 businesses in this sector. There were 165 residents of the municipality who were employed in some capacity, of which females made up 37.6% of the workforce.

In 2008 the total number of full-time equivalent jobs was 51. The number of jobs in the primary sector was 20, of which 19 were in agriculture and were in fishing or fisheries. The number of jobs in the secondary sector was 15 of which 10 or (66.7%) were in manufacturing and 5 (33.3%) were in construction. The number of jobs in the tertiary sector was 16. In the tertiary sector; 5 or 31.3% were in wholesale or retail sales or the repair of motor vehicles, 3 or 18.8% were in a hotel or restaurant, 1 was a technical professional or scientist, 3 or 18.8% were in education and 1 was in health care.

In 2000, there were 38 workers who commuted into the municipality and 100 workers who commuted away. The municipality is a net exporter of workers, with about 2.6 workers leaving the municipality for every one entering. About 21.1% of the workforce coming into Burtigny are coming from outside Switzerland. Of the working population, 8.5% used public transportation to get to work, and 52.7% used a private car.

== Religion ==
From the 2000 census, 44 or 14.1% were Roman Catholic, while 170 or 54.7% belonged to the Swiss Reformed Church. Of the rest of the population, there was 1 member of an Orthodox church, and there were 88 individuals (or about 28.30% of the population) who belonged to another Christian church. There was 1 individual who was Islamic. 33 (or about 10.61% of the population) belonged to no church, are agnostic or atheist, and 18 individuals (or about 5.79% of the population) did not answer the question.

== Education ==
In Burtigny about 102 or (32.8%) of the population have completed non-mandatory upper secondary education, and 37 or (11.9%) have completed additional higher education (either university or a Fachhochschule). Of the 37 who completed tertiary schooling, 56.8% were Swiss men, 27.0% were Swiss women.

In the 2009/2010 school year there were a total of 32 students in the Burtigny school district. In the Vaud cantonal school system, two years of non-obligatory pre-school are provided by the political districts. During the school year, the political district provided pre-school care for a total of 1,249 children of which 563 children (45.1%) received subsidized pre-school care. The canton's primary school program requires students to attend for four years. There were 19 students in the municipal primary school program. The obligatory lower secondary school program lasts for six years and there were 11 students in those schools. There were also 2 students who were home schooled or attended another non-traditional school.

As of 2000, there were 6 students in Burtigny who came from another municipality, while 52 residents attended schools outside the municipality.
