= Bassins =

- Municipality
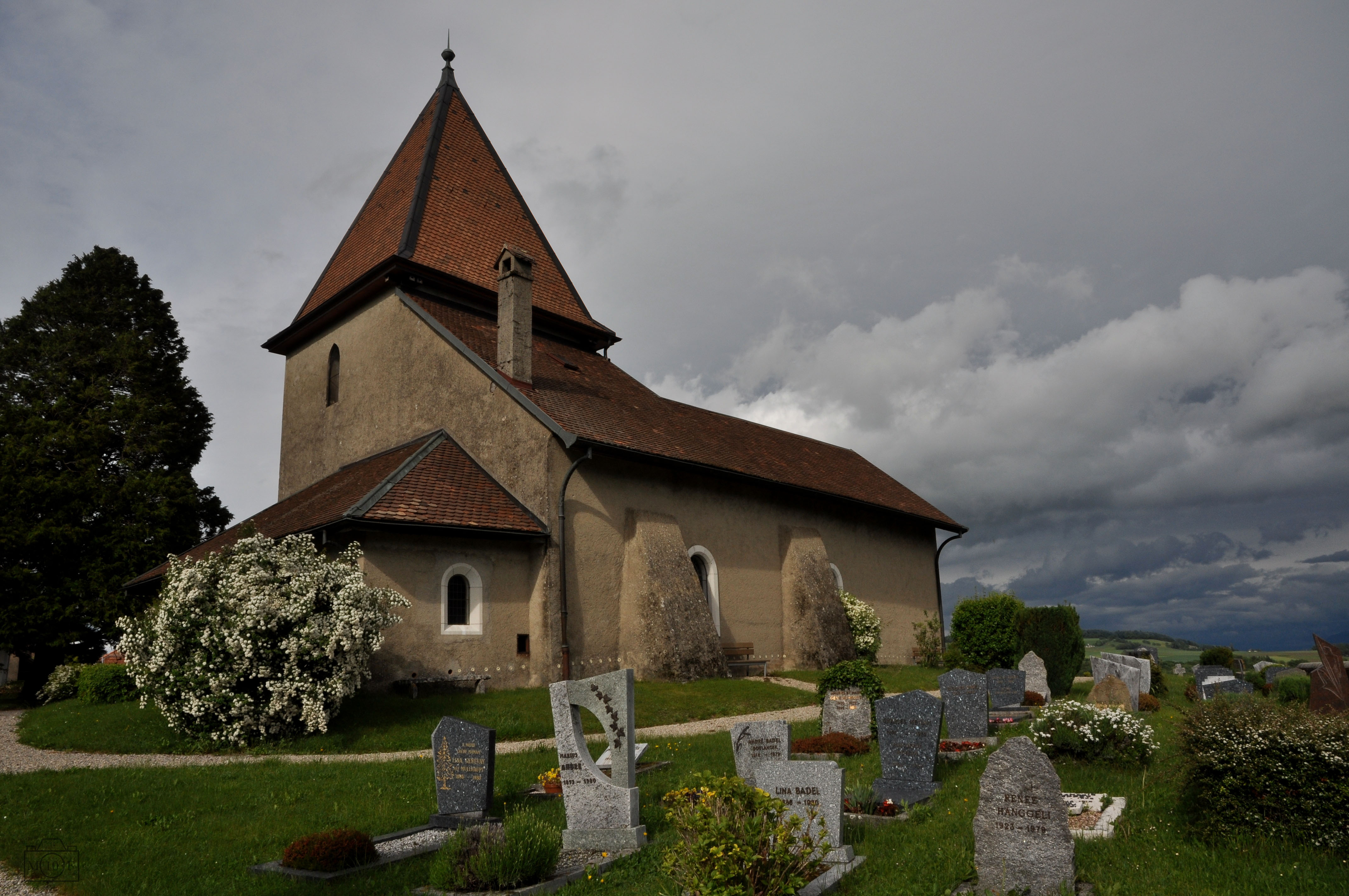
- Église Notre-Dame

- Flag Coat of arms
- Location of Bassins
- Location within Switzerland Location within Canton of Vaud
- Coordinates: 46°28′N 6°14′E
- Country: Switzerland
- Canton: Vaud
- District: Nyon

Government
  - Mayor: Syndic

Area
  - Total: 20.80 km^{2} (8.03 sq mi)
- Elevation: 753 m (2,470 ft)

Population (2018)
  - Total: 1,347
  - Density: 64.76/km^{2} (167.7/sq mi)
- Time zone: UTC+01:00 (CET)
  - Summer (DST): UTC+02:00 (CEST)
- Postal code: 1269
- SFOS number: 5703
- ISO 3166 code: CH-VD
- Surrounded by: Arzier, Begnins, Le Chenit, Le Vaud, Marchissy, Vich
- Website: www.bassins.ch

Bassins (French pronunciation: [basɛ̃]) is a municipality in the district of Nyon in the canton of Vaud in Switzerland. The village of Bassins is located in the foothills of the Jura, at an average altitude of about 800 metres.

== History ==
Bassins is first mentioned in 1095 as Bassins.

== Geography ==
Bassins has an area, as of 2009, of 20.8 square kilometers (8.0 mi^{2}). Of this area, 7.41 km^{2} (2.86 mi^{2}) or 35.6% is used for agricultural purposes, while 12.73 km^{2} (4.92 mi^{2}) or 61.2% is forested. Of the rest of the land, 0.7 km^{2} (0.27 mi^{2}) or 3.4% is settled (buildings or roads) and 0.03 km^{2} (7.4 acres) or 0.1% is unproductive land.

Of the built up area, housing and buildings made up 2.0% and transportation infrastructure made up 1.3%. Out of the forested land, 58.9% of the total land area is heavily forested and 2.4% is covered with orchards or small clusters of trees. Of the agricultural land, 8.2% is used for growing crops and 3.6% is pastures and 23.6% is used for alpine pastures.

The municipality was part of the Nyon District until it was dissolved on 31 August 2006, and Bassins became part of the new district of Nyon.

The municipality is located at the foot of the Jura Mountains on a small terrace above Nyon.

== Coat of arms ==
The blazon of the municipal coat of arms is Per fess, 1. Azure, on a ground Vert a pine tree of the same upon which a bird proper, and on each side passant toward the tree a fox proper and a bear Sable, langued and armed Gules; 2. Gules, on a base Argent a spring-well proper. The coat of arms is an example of canting because the spring-well is a basin or in French, Bassin.

== Demographics ==
Bassins has a population (as of December 2020) of 1,464. As of 2008, 23.5% of the population are resident foreign nationals. Over the last 10 years (1999–2009 ) the population has changed at a rate of 43%. It has changed at a rate of 31.3% due to migration and at a rate of 11.6% due to births and deaths.

Most of the population (as of 2000) speaks French (681 or 81.9%), with German being second most common (69 or 8.3%) and English being third (46 or 5.5%). There are 10 people who speak Italian.

The age distribution, as of 2009, in Bassins is; 188 children or 16.9% of the population are between 0 and 9 years old and 153 teenagers or 13.7% are between 10 and 19. Of the adult population, 81 people or 7.3% of the population are between 20 and 29 years old. 165 people or 14.8% are between 30 and 39, 226 people or 20.3% are between 40 and 49, and 128 people or 11.5% are between 50 and 59. The senior population distribution is 104 people or 9.3% of the population are between 60 and 69 years old, 42 people or 3.8% are between 70 and 79, there are 23 people or 2.1% who are between 80 and 89, and there are 5 people or 0.4% who are 90 and older.

As of 2000, there were 351 people who were single and never married in the municipality. There were 406 married individuals, 27 widows or widowers and 48 individuals who are divorced.

As of 2000, there were 330 private households in the municipality, and an average of 2.4 persons per household. There were 99 households that consist of only one person and 28 households with five or more people. Out of a total of 342 households that answered this question, 28.9% were households made up of just one person and there were 2 adults who lived with their parents. Of the rest of the households, there are 101 married couples without children, 103 married couples with children There were 21 single parents with a child or children. There were 4 households that were made up of unrelated people and 12 households that were made up of some sort of institution or another collective housing.

In 2000 there were 182 single family homes (or 66.9% of the total) out of a total of 272 inhabited buildings. There were 34 multi-family buildings (12.5%), along with 33 multi-purpose buildings that were mostly used for housing (12.1%) and 23 other use buildings (commercial or industrial) that also had some housing (8.5%). Of the single family homes 26 were built before 1919, while 18 were built between 1990 and 2000. The greatest number of single family homes (50) were built between 1981 and 1990. The most multi-family homes (11) were built before 1919 and the next most (9) were built between 1971 and 1980. There was 1 multi-family house built between 1996 and 2000.

In 2000, a total of 314 apartments (81.6% of the total) were permanently occupied, while 60 apartments (15.6%) were seasonally occupied and 11 apartments (2.9%) were empty. As of 2009, the construction rate of new housing units was 1.8 new units per 1000 residents. The vacancy rate for the municipality, in 2010, was 0%.

The historical population is given in the following chart:

== Politics ==
In the 2007 federal election the most popular party was the SP which received 21.82% of the vote. The next three most popular parties were the SVP (20.82%), the Green Party (16.28%) and the FDP (12.69%). In the federal election, a total of 297 votes were cast, and the voter turnout was 48.6%.

== Economy ==
As of 2010, Bassins had an unemployment rate of 3.2%. As of 2008, there were 44 people employed in the primary economic sector and about 13 businesses involved in this sector. 55 people were employed in the secondary sector and there were 16 businesses in this sector. 88 people were employed in the tertiary sector, with 21 businesses in this sector. There were 434 residents of the municipality who were employed in some capacity, of which females made up 42.4% of the workforce.

In 2008 the total number of full-time equivalent jobs was 137. The number of jobs in the primary sector was 28, of which 25 were in agriculture and 3 were in forestry or lumber production. The number of jobs in the secondary sector was 45 of which 24 or (53.3%) were in manufacturing and 22 (48.9%) were in construction. The number of jobs in the tertiary sector was 64. In the tertiary sector; 17 or 26.6% were in wholesale or retail sales or the repair of motor vehicles, 2 or 3.1% were in the movement and storage of goods, 7 or 10.9% were in a hotel or restaurant, 3 or 4.7% were technical professionals or scientists, 7 or 10.9% were in education and 4 or 6.3% were in health care.

In 2000, there were 67 workers who commuted into the municipality and 329 workers who commuted away. The municipality is a net exporter of workers, with about 4.9 workers leaving the municipality for every one entering. About 23.9% of the workforce coming into Bassins are coming from outside Switzerland. Of the working population, 14.3% used public transportation to get to work, and 67.3% used a private car.

== Religion ==
From the 2000 census, 210 or 25.2% were Roman Catholic, while 374 or 45.0% belonged to the Swiss Reformed Church. Of the rest of the population, there were 6 members of an Orthodox church (or about 0.72% of the population), and there were 59 individuals (or about 7.09% of the population) who belonged to another Christian church. There were 3 individuals (or about 0.36% of the population) who were Jewish, and 2 (or about 0.24% of the population) who were Islamic. There was 1 person who was Buddhist and 1 individual who belonged to another church. 168 (or about 20.19% of the population) belonged to no church, are agnostic or atheist, and 35 individuals (or about 4.21% of the population) did not answer the question.

== Education ==
In Bassins about 286 or (34.4%) of the population have completed non-mandatory upper secondary education, and 179 or (21.5%) have completed additional higher education (either university or a Fachhochschule). Of the 179 who completed tertiary schooling, 50.3% were Swiss men, 29.1% were Swiss women, 13.4% were non-Swiss men and 7.3% were non-Swiss women.

In the 2009/2010 school year there were a total of 205 students in the Bassins school district. In the Vaud cantonal school system, two years of non-obligatory pre-school are provided by the political districts. During the school year, the political district provided pre-school care for a total of 1,249 children of which 563 children (45.1%) received subsidized pre-school care. The canton's primary school program requires students to attend for four years. There were 125 students in the municipal primary school program. The obligatory lower secondary school program lasts for six years and there were 77 students in those schools. There were also 3 students who were home schooled or attended another non-traditional school.

As of 2000, there were 5 students in Bassins who came from another municipality, while 100 residents attended schools outside the municipality.

== Sights ==
The Toblerone line : a walking trail showing World War II fortifications and defences. The Bassins swimming pool : an indoor swimming pool open all year round. The Distillerie de Bassins : a distillery of aromatic and medicinal plants (visits organised in July).

== Transport ==
The Nyon–St-Cergue–Morez Railway (NStCM) stop Bassins is located some distance from the village centre. However, a PostBus Switzerland bus service (line no. 825) connects the railway stop to the village. Additionally, there is also the PostBus Switzerland line no. 820, which connects Nyon to St. George and runs through Bassins.
