= Essertines-sur-Rolle =

- Municipality
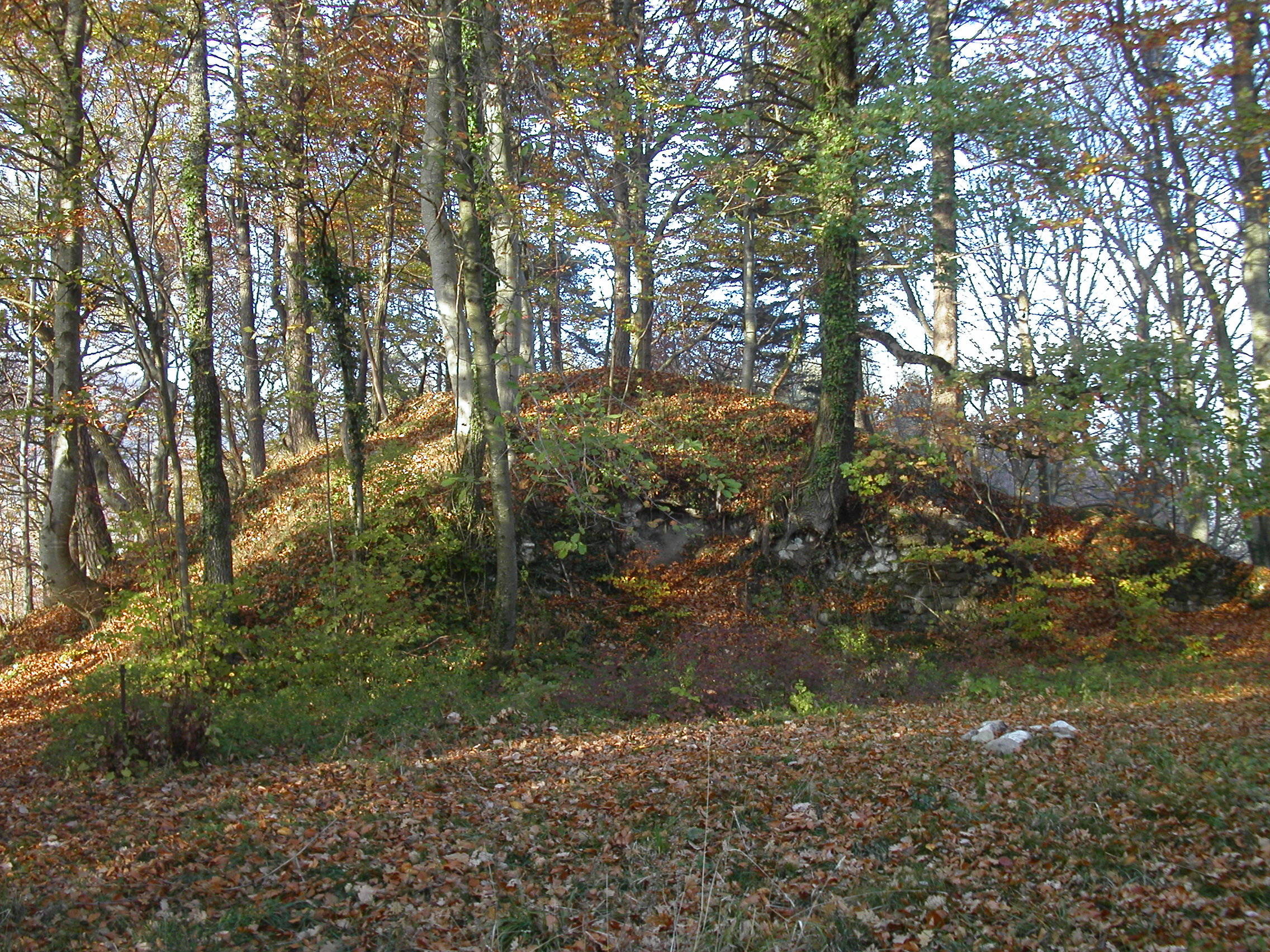

- Flag Coat of arms
- Location of Essertines-sur-Rolle
- Location within Switzerland Location within Canton of Vaud
- Coordinates: 46°30′N 06°19′E
- Country: Switzerland
- Canton: Vaud
- District: Nyon

Government
  - Mayor: Syndic; Samuel Dufour

Area
  - Total: 6.92 km^{2} (2.67 sq mi)
- Elevation: 727 m (2,385 ft)

Population (2004)
  - Total: 532
  - Density: 76.9/km^{2} (199/sq mi)
- Demonym(s): Les Essertinois; Les Croque-lendines
- Time zone: UTC+01:00 (CET)
  - Summer (DST): UTC+02:00 (CEST)
- Postal code: 1186
- SFOS number: 5856
- ISO 3166 code: CH-VD
- Localities: Bugnaux, Châtel-sur-Rolle
- Surrounded by: Saint-Oyens, Gimel, Pizy, Bougy-Villars, Mont-sur-Rolle, Tartegnin, Gilly, Burtigny
- Website: www.essertines-sur-rolle.ch

Essertines-sur-Rolle (French pronunciation: [esɛʁtin syʁ ʁɔl], literally Essertines on Rolle) is a municipality in the district of Nyon in the canton of Vaud in Switzerland.

== History ==
Essertines-sur-Rolle is first mentioned in 1152 as Essartinis.

== Geography ==
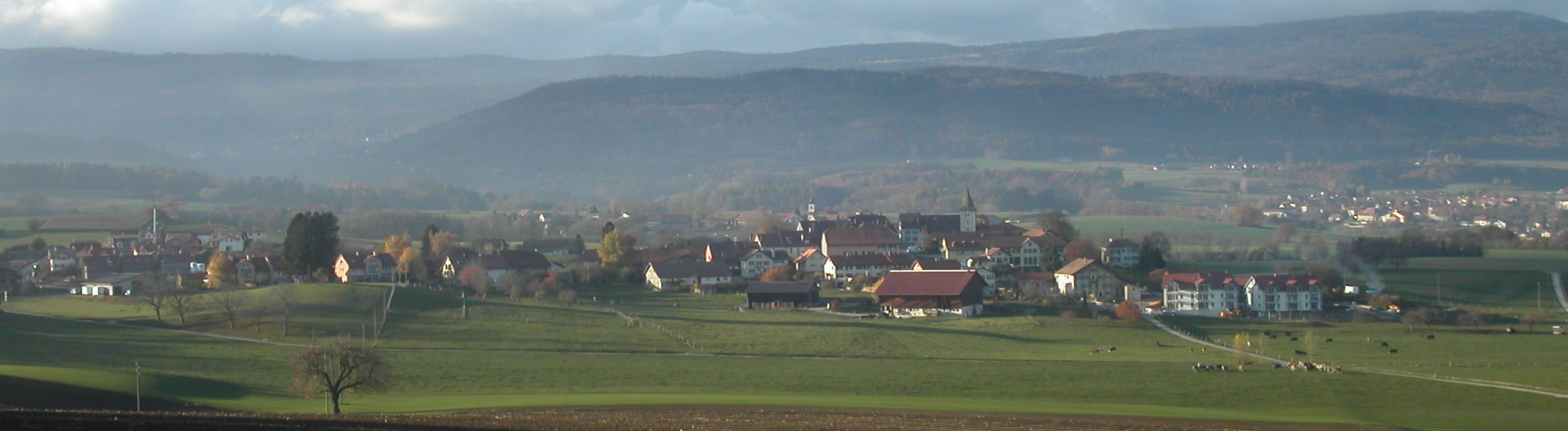
Essertines-sur-Rolle (Vaud, Switzerland)

Essertines-sur-Rolle has an area, as of 2009, of 7 square kilometers (2.7 mi^{2}). Of this area, 4.88 km^{2} (1.88 mi^{2}) or 70.2% is used for agricultural purposes, while 1.59 km^{2} (0.61 mi^{2}) or 22.9% is forested. Of the rest of the land, 0.53 km^{2} (0.20 mi^{2}) or 7.6% is settled (buildings or roads).

Of the built up area, housing and buildings made up 3.9% and transportation infrastructure made up 2.2%. Out of the forested land, 20.0% of the total land area is heavily forested and 2.9% is covered with orchards or small clusters of trees. Of the agricultural land, 47.3% is used for growing crops and 12.9% is pastures, while 9.9% is used for orchards or vine crops.

The municipality was part of the Rolle District until it was dissolved on 31 August 2006, and Essertines-sur-Rolle became part of the new district of Nyon.

It consists of the village of Essertines-sur-Rolle and the hamlet of Bugnaux.

== Coat of arms ==
The blazon of the municipal coat of arms is Or, three Annulets one and two interwoven Sable, in chief Vert a Saltire couped Or.

== Demographics ==
Essertines-sur-Rolle has a population (as of December 2020) of 741. As of 2008, 20.9% of the population are resident foreign nationals. Over the last 10 years (1999–2009 ) the population has changed at a rate of 36.1%. It has changed at a rate of 23.2% due to migration and at a rate of 12.7% due to births and deaths.

Most of the population (as of 2000) speaks French (391 or 78.8%), with German being second most common (41 or 8.3%) and English being third (28 or 5.6%). There are 8 people who speak Italian.

The age distribution, as of 2009, in Essertines-sur-Rolle is; 124 children or 18.7% of the population are between 0 and 9 years old and 80 teenagers or 12.0% are between 10 and 19. Of the adult population, 70 people or 10.5% of the population are between 20 and 29 years old. 117 people or 17.6% are between 30 and 39, 106 people or 16.0% are between 40 and 49, and 79 people or 11.9% are between 50 and 59. The senior population distribution is 59 people or 8.9% of the population are between 60 and 69 years old, 13 people or 2.0% are between 70 and 79, there are 14 people or 2.1% who are between 80 and 89, and there are 2 people or 0.3% who are 90 and older.

As of 2000, there were 226 people who were single and never married in the municipality. There were 231 married individuals, 17 widows or widowers and 22 individuals who are divorced.

As of 2000 the average number of residents per living room was 0.56 which is about equal to the cantonal average of 0.61 per room. In this case, a room is defined as space of a housing unit of at least 4 m^{2} (43 sq ft) as normal bedrooms, dining rooms, living rooms, kitchens and habitable cellars and attics. About 46.8% of the total households were owner occupied, or in other words did not pay rent (though they may have a mortgage or a rent-to-own agreement).

As of 2000, there were 179 private households in the municipality, and an average of 2.6 persons per household. There were 52 households that consist of only one person and 19 households with five or more people. Out of a total of 191 households that answered this question, 27.2% were households made up of just one person. Of the rest of the households, there are 44 married couples without children, 69 married couples with children There were 8 single parents with a child or children. There were 6 households that were made up of unrelated people and 12 households that were made up of some sort of institution or another collective housing.

In 2000 there were 69 single family homes (or 50.7% of the total) out of a total of 136 inhabited buildings. There were 22 multi-family buildings (16.2%), along with 34 multi-purpose buildings that were mostly used for housing (25.0%) and 11 other use buildings (commercial or industrial) that also had some housing (8.1%).

In 2000, a total of 139 apartments (70.6% of the total) were permanently occupied, while 51 apartments (25.9%) were seasonally occupied and 7 apartments (3.6%) were empty. As of 2009, the construction rate of new housing units was 0 new units per 1000 residents. The vacancy rate for the municipality, in 2010, was 3.36%.

The historical population is given in the following chart:

== Sights ==
The entire hamlet of Bugnaux is designated as part of the Inventory of Swiss Heritage Sites.

== Politics ==
In the 2007 federal election the most popular party was the SVP which received 22.52% of the vote. The next three most popular parties were the SP (18.09%), the Green Party (13.95%) and the FDP (12.3%). In the federal election, a total of 177 votes were cast, and the voter turnout was 48.2%.

== Economy ==
As of 2010, Essertines-sur-Rolle had an unemployment rate of 2.9%. As of 2008, there were 83 people employed in the primary economic sector and about 14 businesses involved in this sector. 7 people were employed in the secondary sector and there were 4 businesses in this sector. 35 people were employed in the tertiary sector, with 11 businesses in this sector. There were 282 residents of the municipality who were employed in some capacity, of which females made up 48.2% of the workforce.

In 2008 the total number of full-time equivalent jobs was 71. The number of jobs in the primary sector was 41, all of which were in agriculture. The number of jobs in the secondary sector was 6 of which 4 or (66.7%) were in manufacturing and 2 (33.3%) were in construction. The number of jobs in the tertiary sector was 24. In the tertiary sector; 5 or 20.8% were in wholesale or retail sales or the repair of motor vehicles, 3 or 12.5% were in a hotel or restaurant, 1 was a technical professional or scientist, 6 or 25.0% were in education.

In 2000, there were 24 workers who commuted into the municipality and 197 workers who commuted away. The municipality is a net exporter of workers, with about 8.2 workers leaving the municipality for every one entering. Of the working population, 10.3% used public transportation to get to work, and 62.1% used a private car.

== Religion ==
From the 2000 census, 126 or 25.4% were Roman Catholic, while 209 or 42.1% belonged to the Swiss Reformed Church. Of the rest of the population, there was 1 member of an Orthodox church, and there were 76 individuals (or about 15.32% of the population) who belonged to another Christian church. There were 5 (or about 1.01% of the population) who were Islamic. 101 (or about 20.36% of the population) belonged to no church, are agnostic or atheist, and 16 individuals (or about 3.23% of the population) did not answer the question.

== Education ==
In Essertines-sur-Rolle about 158 or (31.9%) of the population have completed non-mandatory upper secondary education, and 128 or (25.8%) have completed additional higher education (either university or a Fachhochschule). Of the 128 who completed tertiary schooling, 38.3% were Swiss men, 31.3% were Swiss women, 15.6% were non-Swiss men and 14.8% were non-Swiss women.

In the 2009/2010 school year there were a total of 116 students in the Essertines-sur-Rolle school district. In the Vaud cantonal school system, two years of non-obligatory pre-school are provided by the political districts. During the school year, the political district provided pre-school care for a total of 1,249 children of which 563 children (45.1%) received subsidized pre-school care. The canton's primary school program requires students to attend for four years. There were 79 students in the municipal primary school program. The obligatory lower secondary school program lasts for six years and there were 36 students in those schools. There was also 1 student who was home schooled or attended another non-traditional school.

As of 2000, there were 28 students in Essertines-sur-Rolle who came from another municipality, while 83 residents attended schools outside the municipality.
