= Le Chenit =

- Municipality
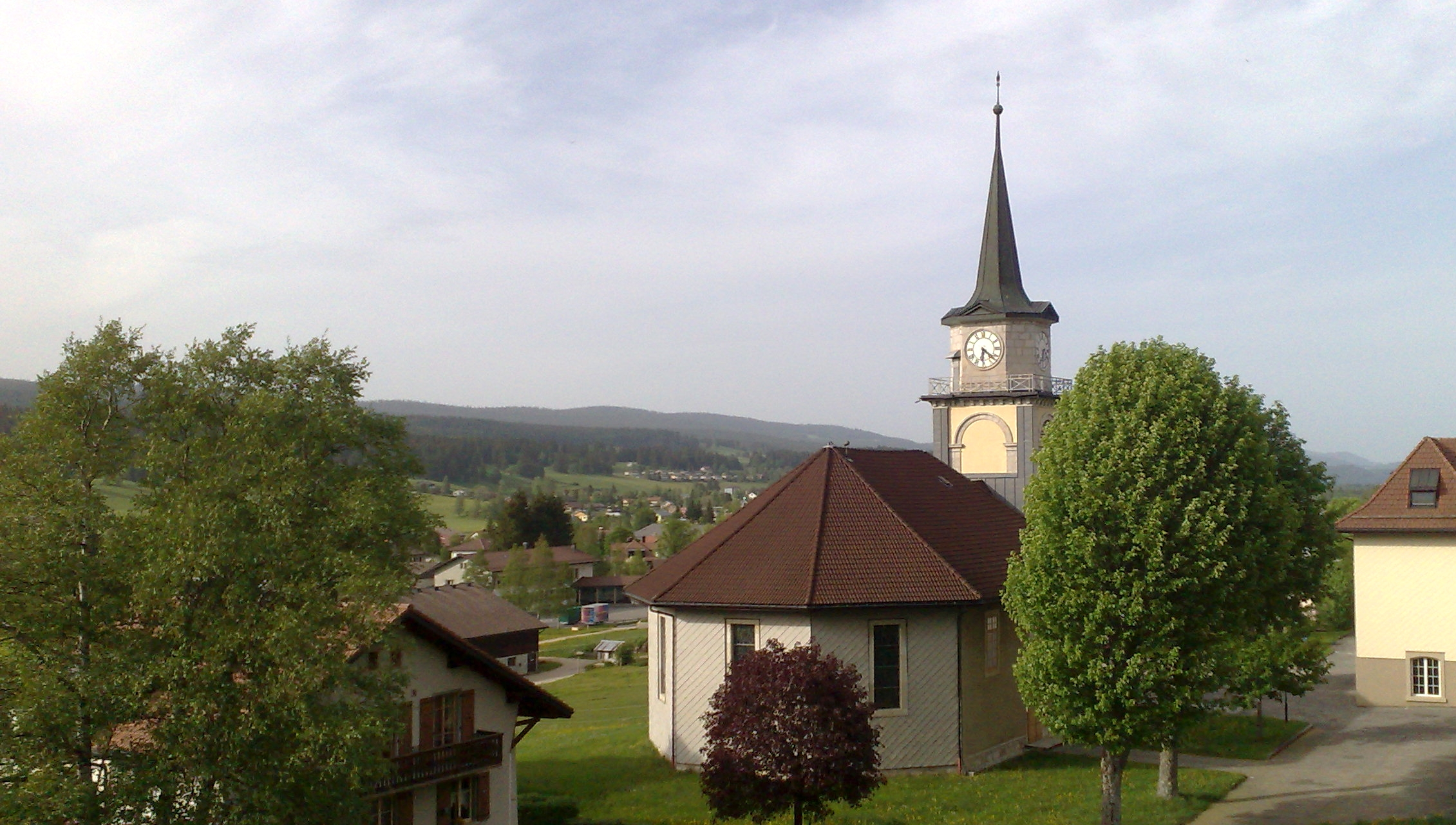
- Le Brassus village church

- Flag Coat of arms
- Location of Le Chenit
- Location within Switzerland Location within Canton of Vaud
- Coordinates: 46°36′N 06°14′E
- Country: Switzerland
- Canton: Vaud
- District: Jura-Nord Vaudois

Government
  - Mayor: Syndic

Area
  - Total: 99.25 km^{2} (38.32 sq mi)
- Elevation: 1,013 m (3,323 ft)

Population (2003)
  - Total: 4,073
  - Density: 41.04/km^{2} (106.3/sq mi)
- Time zone: UTC+01:00 (CET)
  - Summer (DST): UTC+02:00 (CEST)
- Postal codes: 1348 Le Brassus; 1341 L'Orient; 1347 Le Sentier
- SFOS number: 5872
- ISO 3166 code: CH-VD
- Surrounded by: Arzier, Bassins, Berolle, Bière, Bois-d'Amont (FR-39), Chapelle-des-Bois (FR-25), Chaux-Neuve (FR-25), Gimel, L'Abbaye, Le Lieu, Longirod, Marchissy, Montricher, Mouthe (FR-25), Saint-George
- Website: www.communeduchenit.ch

Le Chenit is a municipality in the canton of Vaud in Switzerland, located in the district of Jura-Nord Vaudois in the Vallée de Joux.

== History ==
Le Chenit is first mentioned in 1489 as Chinit.

== Geography ==
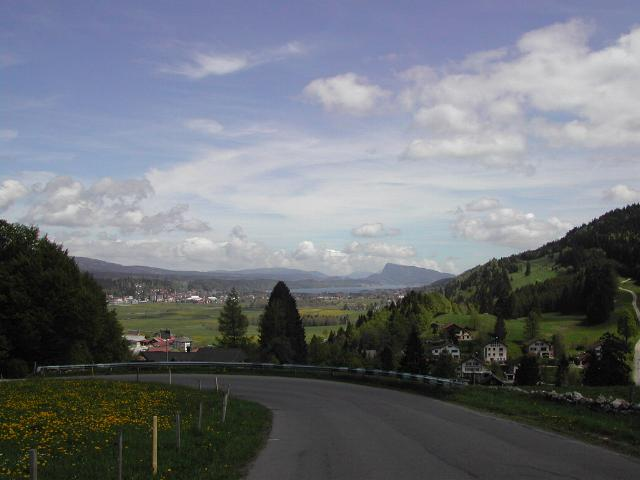
Col du Marchairuz pass in Le Chenit

Aerial view, L'Orient and Le Sentier (1964)

Le Chenit has an area, as of 2009, of 99.25 square kilometers (38.32 sq mi). Of this area, 28.48 km^{2} (11.00 sq mi) or 28.7% is used for agricultural purposes, while 65.87 km^{2} (25.43 sq mi) or 66.4% is forested. Of the rest of the land, 3.06 km^{2} (1.18 sq mi) or 3.1% is settled (buildings or roads), 0.19 km^{2} (0.073 sq mi) or 0.2% is either rivers or lakes and 1.64 km^{2} (0.63 sq mi) or 1.7% is unproductive land.

Of the built up area, housing and buildings made up 1.5% and transportation infrastructure made up 1.1%. Out of the forested land, 62.2% of the total land area is heavily forested and 4.1% is covered with orchards or small clusters of trees. Of the agricultural land, 0.0% is used for growing crops and 8.8% is pastures and 19.9% is used for alpine pastures. All the water in the municipality is flowing water.

The municipality was part of the La Vallée District until it was dissolved on 31 August 2006, and Le Chenit became part of the new district of Jura-Nord Vaudois.

It is located in the heart of the La Vallée in the Jura Mountains on the French-Swiss border. It is the largest municipality in the upper Vallée de Joux. It consists of the villages of Le Brassus, Le Sentier and L'Orient as well as numerous hamlets. There is no settlement with the name Le Chenit within the municipality of Le Chenit.

== Coat of arms ==
The blazon of the municipal coat of arms is Gules, a Key upright crossed with a Rifle and a Sword in saltire all Argent.

== Demographics ==
Le Chenit has a population (as of December 2020) of 4,595. As of 2008, 22.8% of the population are resident foreign nationals. Over the last 10 years (1999–2009) the population has changed at a rate of 1.6%. It has changed at a rate of 4.6% due to migration and at a rate of -2.5% due to births and deaths.

Most of the population (as of 2000) speaks French (3,807 or 88.6%), with Italian being second most common (124 or 2.9%) and German being third (108 or 2.5%). There are 3 people who speak Romansh.

Of the population in the municipality 1,775 or about 41.3% were born in Le Chenit and lived there in 2000. There were 804 or 18.7% who were born in the same canton, while 495 or 11.5% were born somewhere else in Switzerland, and 1,018 or 23.7% were born outside of Switzerland.

In 2008 there were 27 live births to Swiss citizens and 8 births to non-Swiss citizens, and in same time span there were 36 deaths of Swiss citizens and 5 non-Swiss citizen deaths. Ignoring immigration and emigration, the population of Swiss citizens decreased by 9 while the foreign population increased by 3. There were 3 Swiss men who immigrated back to Switzerland and 9 Swiss women who emigrated from Switzerland. At the same time, there were 43 non-Swiss men and 26 non-Swiss women who immigrated from another country to Switzerland. The total Swiss population change in 2008 (from all sources, including moves across municipal borders) was a decrease of 12 and the non-Swiss population increased by 43 people. This represents a population growth rate of 0.7%.

The age distribution, as of 2009, in Le Chenit is; 412 children or 9.7% of the population are between 0 and 9 years old and 486 teenagers or 11.4% are between 10 and 19. Of the adult population, 489 people or 11.5% of the population are between 20 and 29 years old. 554 people or 13.0% are between 30 and 39, 594 people or 14.0% are between 40 and 49, and 523 people or 12.3% are between 50 and 59. The senior population distribution is 508 people or 12.0% of the population are between 60 and 69 years old, 383 people or 9.0% are between 70 and 79, there are 252 people or 5.9% who are between 80 and 89, and there are 49 people or 1.2% who are 90 and older.

As of 2000, there were 1,621 people who were single and never married in the municipality. There were 2,074 married individuals, 370 widows or widowers and 232 individuals who are divorced.

As of 2000, there were 1,966 private households in the municipality, and an average of 2.1 persons per household. There were 781 households that consist of only one person and 106 households with five or more people. Out of a total of 2,007 households that answered this question, 38.9% were households made up of just one person and there were 13 adults who lived with their parents. Of the rest of the households, there are 586 married couples without children, 465 married couples with children. There were 89 single parents with a child or children. There were 32 households that were made up of unrelated people and 41 households that were made up of some sort of institution or another collective housing.

In 2000 there were 550 single-family homes (or 49.9% of the total) out of a total of 1,103 inhabited buildings. There were 330 multi-family buildings (29.9%), along with 147 multi-purpose buildings that were mostly used for housing (13.3%) and 76 other use buildings (commercial or industrial) that also had some housing (6.9%). Of the single-family homes 92 were built before 1919, while 25 were built between 1990 and 2000. The greatest number of single-family homes (147) were built between 1946 and 1960. The most multi-family homes (158) were built before 1919 and the next most (55) were built between 1919 and 1945. There was 1 multi-family house built between 1996 and 2000.

In 2000 there were 2,318 apartments in the municipality. The most common apartment size was 3 rooms of which there were 721. There were 126 single-room apartments and 513 apartments with five or more rooms. Of these apartments, a total of 1,917 apartments (82.7% of the total) were permanently occupied, while 250 apartments (10.8%) were seasonally occupied and 151 apartments (6.5%) were empty. As of 2009, the construction rate of new housing units was 1.2 new units per 1000 residents. The vacancy rate for the municipality, in 2010, was 0.12%.

The historical population is given in the following chart:

== Sights ==
The entire villages of Le Sentier and Le Solliat and the hamlet of Chez-les-Aubert are designated as part of the Inventory of Swiss Heritage Sites.

== Politics ==
In the 2007 federal election the most popular party was the SP which received 37.65% of the vote. The next three most popular parties were the SVP (19.92%), the FDP (10.08%) and the Green Party (8.04%). In the federal election, a total of 1,063 votes were cast, and the voter turnout was 40.9%.

== Economy ==
As of 2010, Le Chenit had an unemployment rate of 5.2%. As of 2008, there were 100 people employed in the primary economic sector and about 31 businesses involved in this sector. 3,448 people were employed in the secondary sector and there were 76 businesses in this sector. 1,184 people were employed in the tertiary sector, with 138 businesses in this sector. There were 2,053 residents of the municipality who were employed in some capacity, of which females made up 43.6% of the workforce.

In 2008 the total number of full-time equivalent jobs was 4,317. The number of jobs in the primary sector was 83, of which 49 were in agriculture and 35 were in forestry or lumber production. The number of jobs in the secondary sector was 3,286 of which 3,055 or (93.0%) were in manufacturing and 175 (5.3%) were in construction. The number of jobs in the tertiary sector was 948. In the tertiary sector; 384 or 40.5% were in wholesale or retail sales or the repair of motor vehicles, 39 or 4.1% were in the movement and storage of goods, 103 or 10.9% were in a hotel or restaurant, 25 or 2.6% were in the information industry, 19 or 2.0% were the insurance or financial industry, 35 or 3.7% were technical professionals or scientists, 85 or 9.0% were in education and 162 or 17.1% were in health care.

In 2000, there were 3,809 workers who commuted into the municipality and 400 workers who commuted away. The municipality is a net importer of workers, with about 9.5 workers entering the municipality for every one leaving. About 43.0% of the workforce coming into Le Chenit are coming from outside Switzerland. Of the working population, 3.7% used public transportation to get to work, and 66.6% used a private car.

== Religion ==
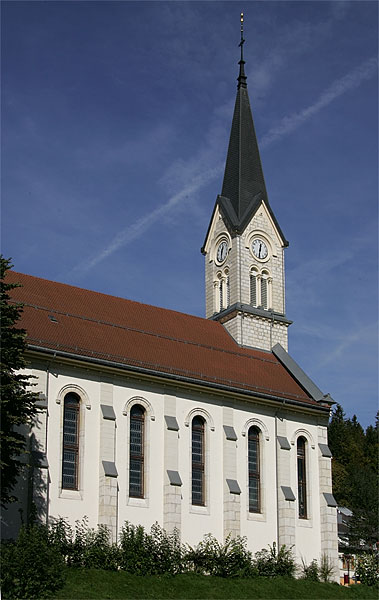
Le Sentier church

From the 2000 census, 1,255 or 29.2% were Roman Catholic, while 1,978 or 46.0% belonged to the Swiss Reformed Church. Of the rest of the population, there were 12 members of an Orthodox church (or about 0.28% of the population), and there were 200 individuals (or about 4.65% of the population) who belonged to another Christian church. There were 2 individuals (or about 0.05% of the population) who were Jewish, and 128 (or about 2.98% of the population) who were Islamic. There was 1 person who was Buddhist, 13 individuals who were Hindu and 4 individuals who belonged to another church. 544 (or about 12.66% of the population) belonged to no church, are agnostic or atheist, and 257 individuals (or about 5.98% of the population) did not answer the question.

== Education ==
In Le Chenit about 1,469 or (34.2%) of the population have completed non-mandatory upper secondary education, and 408 or (9.5%) have completed additional higher education (either university or a Fachhochschule). Of the 408 who completed tertiary schooling, 55.9% were Swiss men, 25.7% were Swiss women, 10.8% were non-Swiss men and 7.6% were non-Swiss women.

In the 2009/2010 school year there were a total of 489 students in the Le Chenit school district. In the Vaud cantonal school system, two years of non-obligatory pre-school are provided by the political districts. During the school year, the political district provided pre-school care for a total of 578 children of which 359 children (62.1%) received subsidized pre-school care. The canton's primary school program requires students to attend for four years. There were 253 students in the municipal primary school program. The obligatory lower secondary school program lasts for six years and there were 229 students in those schools. There were also 7 students who were home schooled or attended another non-traditional school.

As of 2000, there were 162 students in Le Chenit who came from another municipality, while 143 residents attended schools outside the municipality.
