= Veyron =

Veyron is a French surname. Notable people with the surname include:

- Hervé Granger-Veyron, a French fencer
- Juan Sebastián Verón, a misspelling of the surname of the Argentine footballer
- Martin Veyron, a French comic book author and novelist
- Pierre Veyron, a Grand Prix motor racing driver active from 1933 until 1953
- Robert Veyron-Lacroix, a French harpsichordist and pianist
- Roger Veyron, a French basketball player

== See also ==
- Bugatti Veyron, a supercar named after Pierre Veyron
- Chavannes-le-Veyron, a municipality in the district of Cossonay of the canton of Vaud, Switzerland
- Veyron (river), a river in Switzerland
