= Dizy, Switzerland =

Dizy
- Municipality
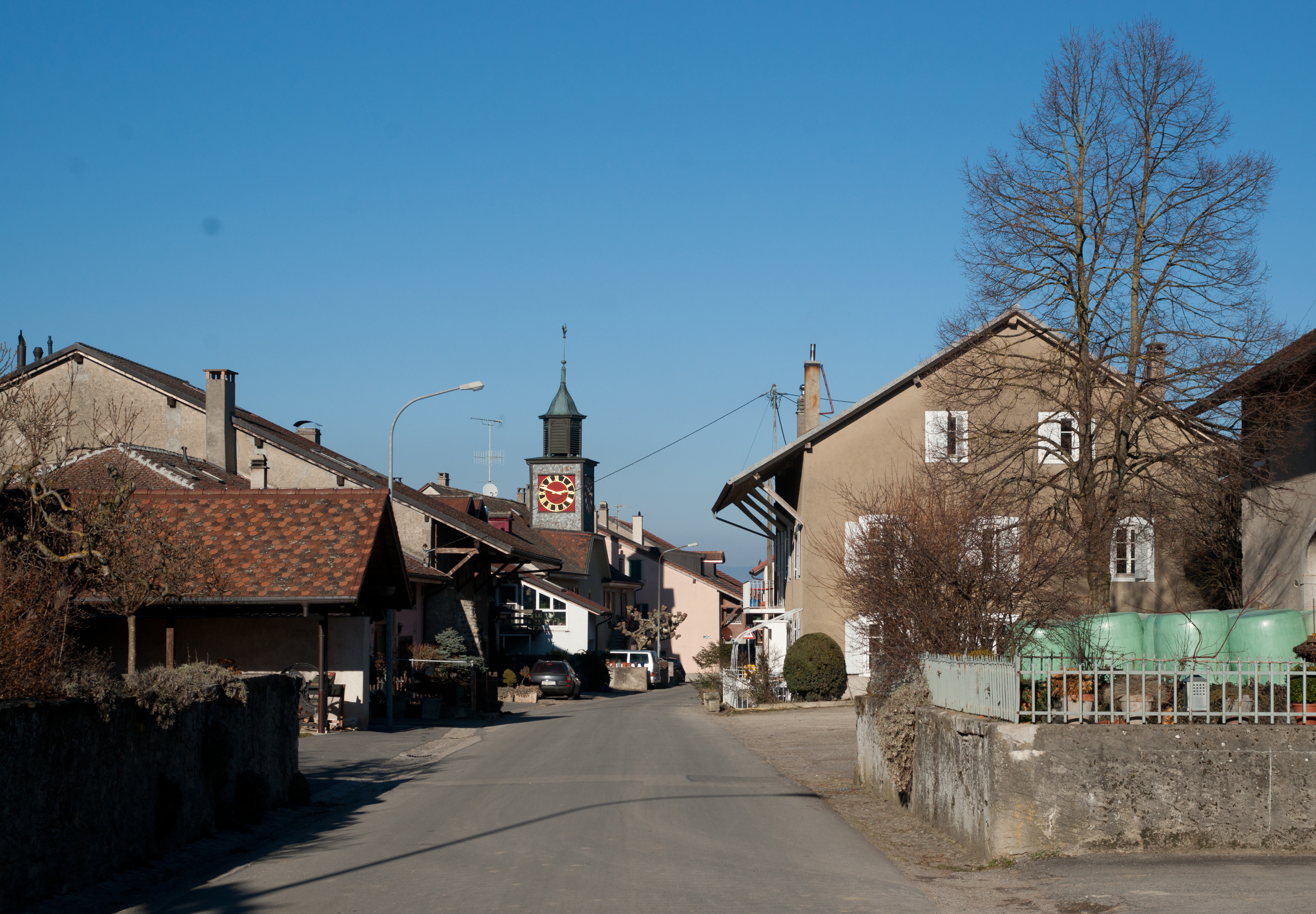
- Dizy village

- Flag Coat of arms
- Location of Dizy
- Location within Switzerland Location within Canton of Vaud
- Coordinates: 46°38′N 06°30′E
- Country: Switzerland
- Canton: Vaud
- District: Morges

Government
  - Mayor: Syndic

Area
  - Total: 3.04 km^{2} (1.17 sq mi)
- Elevation: 583 m (1,913 ft)

Population (2003)
  - Total: 207
  - Density: 68.1/km^{2} (176/sq mi)
- Time zone: UTC+01:00 (CET)
  - Summer (DST): UTC+02:00 (CEST)
- Postal code: 1304
- SFOS number: 5481
- ISO 3166 code: CH-VD
- Surrounded by: Chevilly, Cossonay, La Chaux (Cossonay), La Sarraz, Lussery-Villars
- Website: www.dizy.ch

Dizy is a municipality of the canton of Vaud in Switzerland, located in the district of Morges.

== History ==
Dizy is first mentioned in 961 as in villa Discidis. In 1041 it was mentioned as Dysi.

== Geography ==
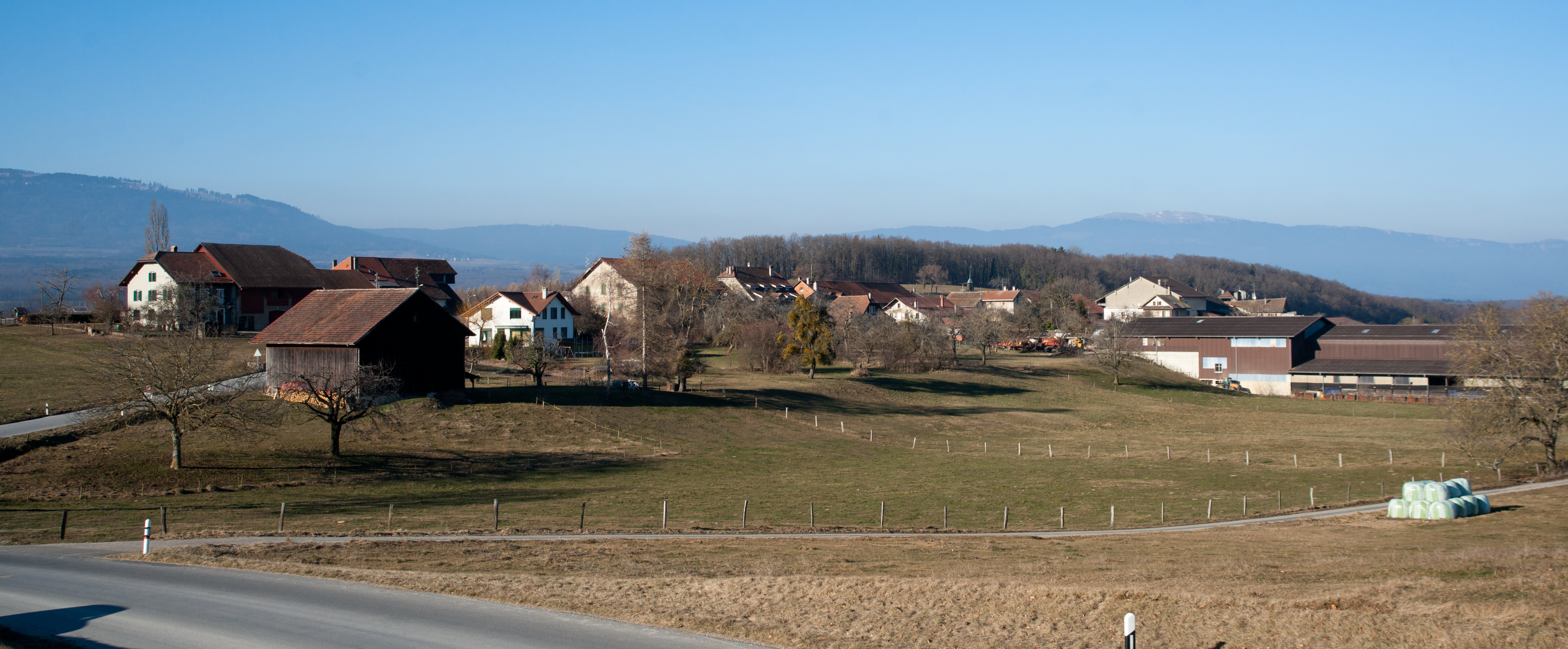
Dizy village

Dizy has an area, as of 2009, of 3.04 square kilometers (1.17 sq mi). Of this area, 2.16 km^{2} (0.83 sq mi) or 71.1% is used for agricultural purposes, while 0.71 km^{2} (0.27 sq mi) or 23.4% is forested. Of the rest of the land, 0.23 km^{2} (0.089 sq mi) or 7.6% is settled (buildings or roads).

Of the built up area, housing and buildings made up 2.0% and transportation infrastructure made up 2.0%. Power and water infrastructure as well as other special developed areas made up 3.6% of the area Out of the forested land, all of the forested land area is covered with heavy forests. Of the agricultural land, 52.0% is used for growing crops and 18.1% is pastures.

The municipality was part of the Cossonay District until it was dissolved on 31 August 2006, and Dizy became part of the new district of Morges.

The municipality is located on a hill between the Venoge and Veyron rivers. It consists of the linear village of Dizy.

== Coat of arms ==
The blazon of the municipal coat of arms is Per pale Azure and Argent, a Saltire counterchanged.

== Demographics ==
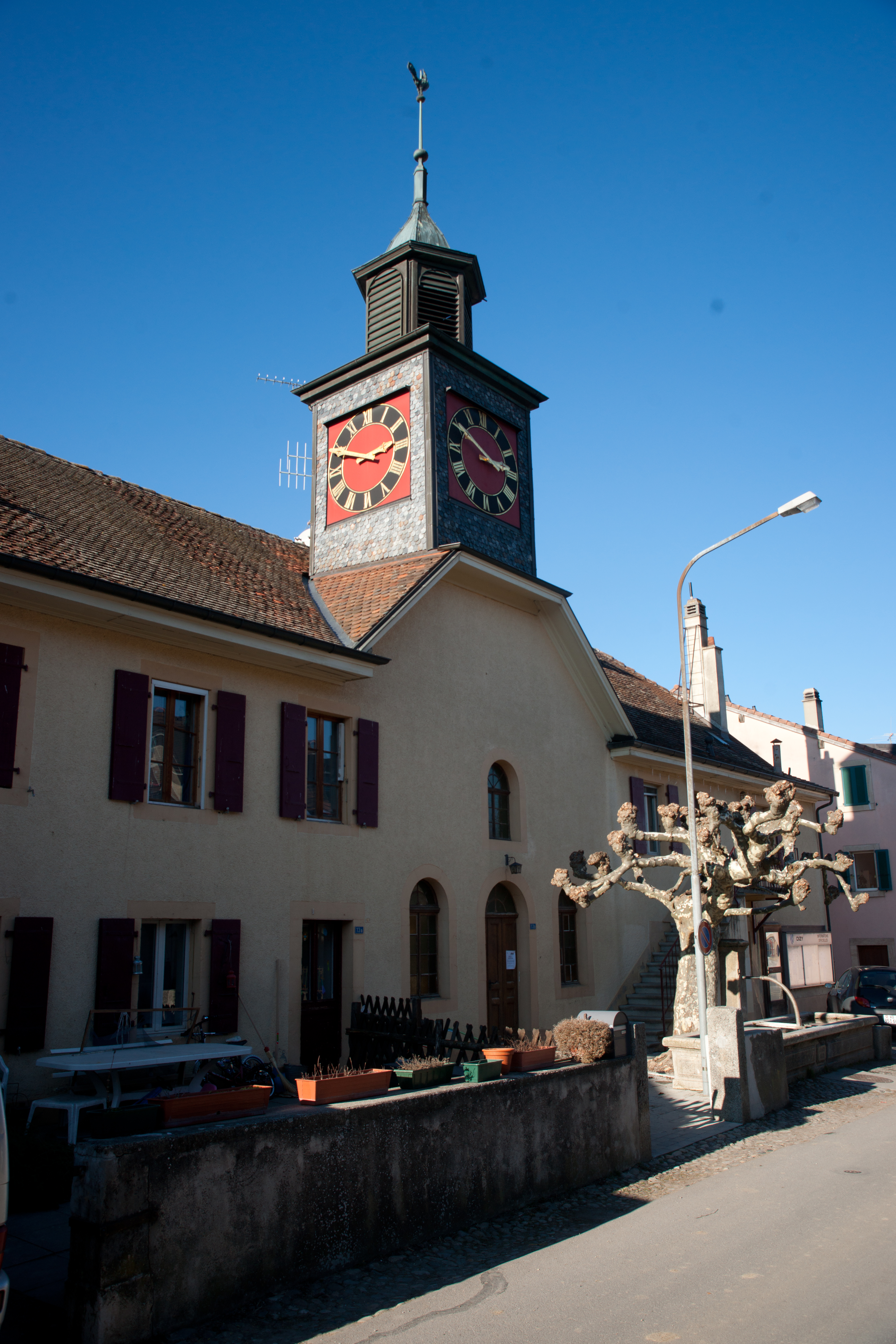
A building in Dizy

Dizy has a population (as of December 2020) of 223. As of 2008, 11.3% of the population are resident foreign nationals. Over the last 10 years (1999–2009 ) the population has changed at a rate of 38.8%. It has changed at a rate of 26.9% due to migration and at a rate of 11.9% due to births and deaths.

Most of the population (as of 2000) speaks French (155 or 91.2%), with Portuguese being second most common (8 or 4.7%) and Albanian being third (3 or 1.8%). There is 1 person who speaks German.

Of the population in the municipality 64 or about 37.6% were born in Dizy and lived there in 2000. There were 65 or 38.2% who were born in the same canton, while 13 or 7.6% were born somewhere else in Switzerland, and 26 or 15.3% were born outside of Switzerland.

In 2008 there were 3 live births to Swiss citizens and 1 birth to non-Swiss citizens, and in same time span there was 1 death of a Swiss citizen. Ignoring immigration and emigration, the population of Swiss citizens increased by 2 while the foreign population increased by 1. At the same time, there was 1 non-Swiss man who emigrated from Switzerland to another country. The total Swiss population change in 2008 (from all sources, including moves across municipal borders) was an increase of 11 and the non-Swiss population decreased by 1 people. This represents a population growth rate of 4.7%.

The age distribution, as of 2009, in Dizy is; 30 children or 13.5% of the population are between 0 and 9 years old and 38 teenagers or 17.1% are between 10 and 19. Of the adult population, 27 people or 12.2% of the population are between 20 and 29 years old. 33 people or 14.9% are between 30 and 39, 36 people or 16.2% are between 40 and 49, and 27 people or 12.2% are between 50 and 59. The senior population distribution is 11 people or 5.0% of the population are between 60 and 69 years old, 13 people or 5.9% are between 70 and 79, there are 7 people or 3.2% who are between 80 and 89.

As of 2000, there were 81 people who were single and never married in the municipality. There were 73 married individuals, 7 widows or widowers and 9 individuals who are divorced.

As of 2000, there were 61 private households in the municipality, and an average of 2.8 persons per household. There were 10 households that consist of only one person and 5 households with five or more people. Out of a total of 62 households that answered this question, 16.1% were households made up of just one person. Of the rest of the households, there are 17 married couples without children, 28 married couples with children There were 5 single parents with a child or children. There was 1 household that was made up of unrelated people and 1 household that was made up of some sort of institution or another collective housing.

In 2000 there were 16 single family homes (or 36.4% of the total) out of a total of 44 inhabited buildings. There were 7 multi-family buildings (15.9%), along with 19 multi-purpose buildings that were mostly used for housing (43.2%) and 2 other use buildings (commercial or industrial) that also had some housing (4.5%). Of the single family homes 8 were built before 1919, while 1 was built between 1990 and 2000. The most multi-family homes (4) were built before 1919 and the next most (1) were built between 1981 and 1990. There was 1 multi-family house built between 1996 and 2000.

In 2000 there were 67 apartments in the municipality. The most common apartment size was 4 rooms of which there were 26. There were 3 single room apartments and 20 apartments with five or more rooms. Of these apartments, a total of 57 apartments (85.1% of the total) were permanently occupied, while 5 apartments (7.5%) were seasonally occupied and 5 apartments (7.5%) were empty. As of 2009, the construction rate of new housing units was 0 new units per 1000 residents. The vacancy rate for the municipality, in 2010, was 0%.

The historical population is given in the following chart:

== Politics ==
In the 2007 federal election the most popular party was the Green Party which received 25.36% of the vote. The next three most popular parties were the SVP (23.21%), the SP (15.05%) and the FDP (12.54%). In the federal election, a total of 64 votes were cast, and the voter turnout was 48.9%.

== Economy ==
As of 2010, Dizy had an unemployment rate of 1.7%. As of 2008, there were 16 people employed in the primary economic sector and about 5 businesses involved in this sector. 4 people were employed in the secondary sector and there were 3 businesses in this sector. 2 people were employed in the tertiary sector, with 2 businesses in this sector. There were 76 residents of the municipality who were employed in some capacity, of which females made up 44.7% of the workforce.

In 2008 the total number of full-time equivalent jobs was 19. The number of jobs in the primary sector was 13, all of which were in agriculture. The number of jobs in the secondary sector was 4 of which 1 was in manufacturing and 1 was in construction. The number of jobs in the tertiary sector was 2. In the tertiary sector; 2 or 100.0% were technical professionals or scientists, .

In 2000, there were 8 workers who commuted into the municipality and 54 workers who commuted away. The municipality is a net exporter of workers, with about 6.8 workers leaving the municipality for every one entering. Of the working population, 9.2% used public transportation to get to work, and 60.5% used a private car.

== Religion ==
From the 2000 census, 34 or 20.0% were Roman Catholic, while 102 or 60.0% belonged to the Swiss Reformed Church. There were5 (or about 2.94% of the population) who were Islamic. There was 1 person who was Buddhist. 26 (or about 15.29% of the population) belonged to no church, are agnostic or atheist, and 2 individuals (or about 1.18% of the population) did not answer the question.

== Education ==
In Dizy about 53 or (31.2%) of the population have completed non-mandatory upper secondary education, and 25 or (14.7%) have completed additional higher education (either university or a Fachhochschule). Of the 25 who completed tertiary schooling, 56.0% were Swiss men, 44.0% were Swiss women.

In the 2009/2010 school year there were a total of 36 students in the Dizy school district. In the Vaud cantonal school system, two years of non-obligatory pre-school are provided by the political districts. During the school year, the political district provided pre-school care for a total of 631 children of which 203 children (32.2%) received subsidized pre-school care. The canton's primary school program requires students to attend for four years. There were 22 students in the municipal primary school program. The obligatory lower secondary school program lasts for six years and there were 14 students in those schools.

As of 2000, there were 38 students from Dizy who attended schools outside the municipality.
