= Mauraz =

- Municipality
- Flag Coat of arms
- Location of Mauraz
- Location within Switzerland Location within Canton of Vaud
- Coordinates: 46°36′N 06°25′E
- Country: Switzerland
- Canton: Vaud
- District: Morges

Government
  - Mayor: Syndic

Area
  - Total: 0.50 km^{2} (0.19 sq mi)
- Elevation: 625 m (2,051 ft)

Population (2003)
  - Total: 40
  - Density: 80/km^{2} (210/sq mi)
- Time zone: UTC+01:00 (CET)
  - Summer (DST): UTC+02:00 (CEST)
- Postal code: 1148
- SFOS number: 5488
- ISO 3166 code: CH-VD
- Surrounded by: L'Isle, Montricher, Pampigny
- Website: www.mauraz.ch

Mauraz is a municipality of the canton of Vaud in Switzerland, located in the district of Morges.

== History ==
Mauraz is first mentioned in 1324 as Moraz. In 1547 it was mentioned as Moura.

== Geography ==
Mauraz has an area, as of 2009, of 0.5 square kilometers (0.19 sq mi). Of this area, 0.38 km^{2} (0.15 sq mi) or 76.0% is used for agricultural purposes, while 0.05 km^{2} (0.019 sq mi) or 10.0% is forested. Of the rest of the land, 0.04 km^{2} (9.9 acres) or 8.0% is settled (buildings or roads).

Of the built up area, housing and buildings made up 8.0% and transportation infrastructure made up 0.0%. Out of the forested land, all of the forested land area is covered with heavy forests. Of the agricultural land, 48.0% is used for growing crops and 26.0% is pastures, while 2.0% is used for orchards or vine crops.

The municipality was part of the Cossonay District until it was dissolved on 31 August 2006, and Mauraz became part of the new district of Morges.

The municipality is located at the confluence of the Veyron and the Morand rivers.

== Coat of arms ==
The blazon of the municipal coat of arms is Azure, a Wall embattled Argent masoned Sable.

== Demographics ==
Mauraz has a population (as of December 2020) of 59. As of 2008, 9.1% of the population are resident foreign nationals. Over the last 10 years (1999–2009 ) the population has changed at a rate of 31%. It has changed at a rate of 19% due to migration and at a rate of 14.3% due to births and deaths.

Most of the population (as of 2000) speaks French (46 or 95.8%), with German being second most common (1 or 2.1%) and Italian being third (1 or 2.1%).

Of the population in the municipality 17 or about 35.4% were born in Mauraz and lived there in 2000. There were 16 or 33.3% who were born in the same canton, while 7 or 14.6% were born somewhere else in Switzerland, and 5 or 10.4% were born outside of Switzerland.

In 2008 there were 2 live births to Swiss citizens and 1 birth to non-Swiss citizens. Ignoring immigration and emigration, the population of Swiss citizens increased by 2 while the foreign population increased by 1. There was 1 Swiss man who emigrated from Switzerland. The total Swiss population change in 2008 (from all sources, including moves across municipal borders) was an increase of 2 and the non-Swiss population increased by 1 people. This represents a population growth rate of 5.8%.

The age distribution, as of 2009, in Mauraz is; 9 children or 16.4% of the population are between 0 and 9 years old and 6 teenagers or 10.9% are between 10 and 19. Of the adult population, 2 people or 3.6% of the population are between 20 and 29 years old. 8 people or 14.5% are between 30 and 39, 14 people or 25.5% are between 40 and 49, and 6 people or 10.9% are between 50 and 59. The senior population distribution is 6 people or 10.9% of the population are between 60 and 69 years old, 4 people or 7.3% are between 70 and 79, there are people or 0.0% who are between 80 and 89.

As of 2000, there were 21 people who were single and never married in the municipality. There were 20 married individuals, 3 widows or widowers and 4 individuals who are divorced.

As of 2000, there were 20 private households in the municipality, and an average of 2.4 persons per household. There were 6 households that consist of only one person and 2 households with five or more people. Out of a total of 20 households that answered this question, 30.0% were households made up of just one person. Of the rest of the households, there are 6 married couples without children, 6 married couples with children There were 2 households that were made up of unrelated people.

In 2000 there were 2 single-family homes (or 16.7% of the total) out of a total of 12 inhabited buildings. There were 3 multi-family buildings (25.0%), along with 6 multi-purpose buildings that were mostly used for housing (50.0%) and 1 other use buildings (commercial or industrial) that also had some housing (8.3%). Of the single-family homes, none were built before 1919. The one single-family home was built between 1919 and 1945. The most multi-family homes (2) were built between 1996 and 2000 and the next most (1) was built before 1919.

In 2000 there were 20 apartments in the municipality. The most common apartment size was 4 rooms of which there were 6. There were single-room apartments and 6 apartments with five or more rooms. Of these apartments, a total of 18 apartments (90.0% of the total) were permanently occupied, while 2 apartments (10.0%) were seasonally occupied. As of 2009, the construction rate of new housing units was 0 new units per 1000 residents. The vacancy rate for the municipality, in 2010, was 0%.

The historical population is given in the following chart:

== Politics ==
In the 2007 federal election the most popular party was the SVP which received 23.38% of the vote. The next three most popular parties were the Green Party (16.9%), the SP (16.34%) and the LPS Party (12.39%). In the federal election, a total of 20 votes were cast, and the voter turnout was 51.3%.

== Economy ==
As of 2010, Mauraz had an unemployment rate of 4%. As of 2008, there were 11 people employed in the primary economic sector and about 4 businesses involved in this sector. 1 person was employed in the secondary sector and there was 1 business in this sector. 3 people were employed in the tertiary sector, with 2 businesses in this sector. There were 25 residents of the municipality who were employed in some capacity, of which females made up 44.0% of the workforce.

In 2008 the total number of full-time equivalent jobs was 11. The number of jobs in the primary sector was 8, all of which were in agriculture. The number of jobs in the secondary sector was 1, in manufacturing. The number of jobs in the tertiary sector was 2. In the tertiary sector; 1 was in the sale or repair of motor vehicles and 1 was a technical professional or scientist.

In 2000, there were 15 workers who commuted away from the municipality. Of the working population, 4% used public transportation to get to work, and 56% used a private car.

The municipality is served by a station on the Bière–Apples–Morges railway.

== Religion ==
From the 2000 census, 10 or 20.8% were Roman Catholic, while 32 or 66.7% belonged to the Swiss Reformed Church. 3 (or about 6.25% of the population) belonged to no church, are agnostic or atheist, and 3 individuals (or about 6.25% of the population) did not answer the question.

== Education ==
In Mauraz about 20 or (41.7%) of the population have completed non-mandatory upper secondary education, and 5 or (10.4%) have completed additional higher education (either university or a Fachhochschule). Of the 5 who completed tertiary schooling, 40.0% were Swiss men, 40.0% were Swiss women.

In the 2009/2010 school year there were a total of 5 students in the Mauraz school district. In the Vaud cantonal school system, two years of non-obligatory pre-school are provided by the political districts. During the school year, the political district provided pre-school care for a total of 631 children of which 203 children (32.2%) received subsidized pre-school care. The canton's primary school program requires students to attend for four years. There were 2 students in the municipal primary school program. The obligatory lower secondary school program lasts for six years and there were 3 students in those schools.

As of 2000, there were 5 students from Mauraz who attended schools outside the municipality.
