= Chevilly =

Chevilly may mean:

- Chevilly, Switzerland in the canton of Vaud
- in France:
  - Chevilly, Loiret
  - Chevilly-Larue, Val-de-Marne
