= Cuarnens =

- Municipality
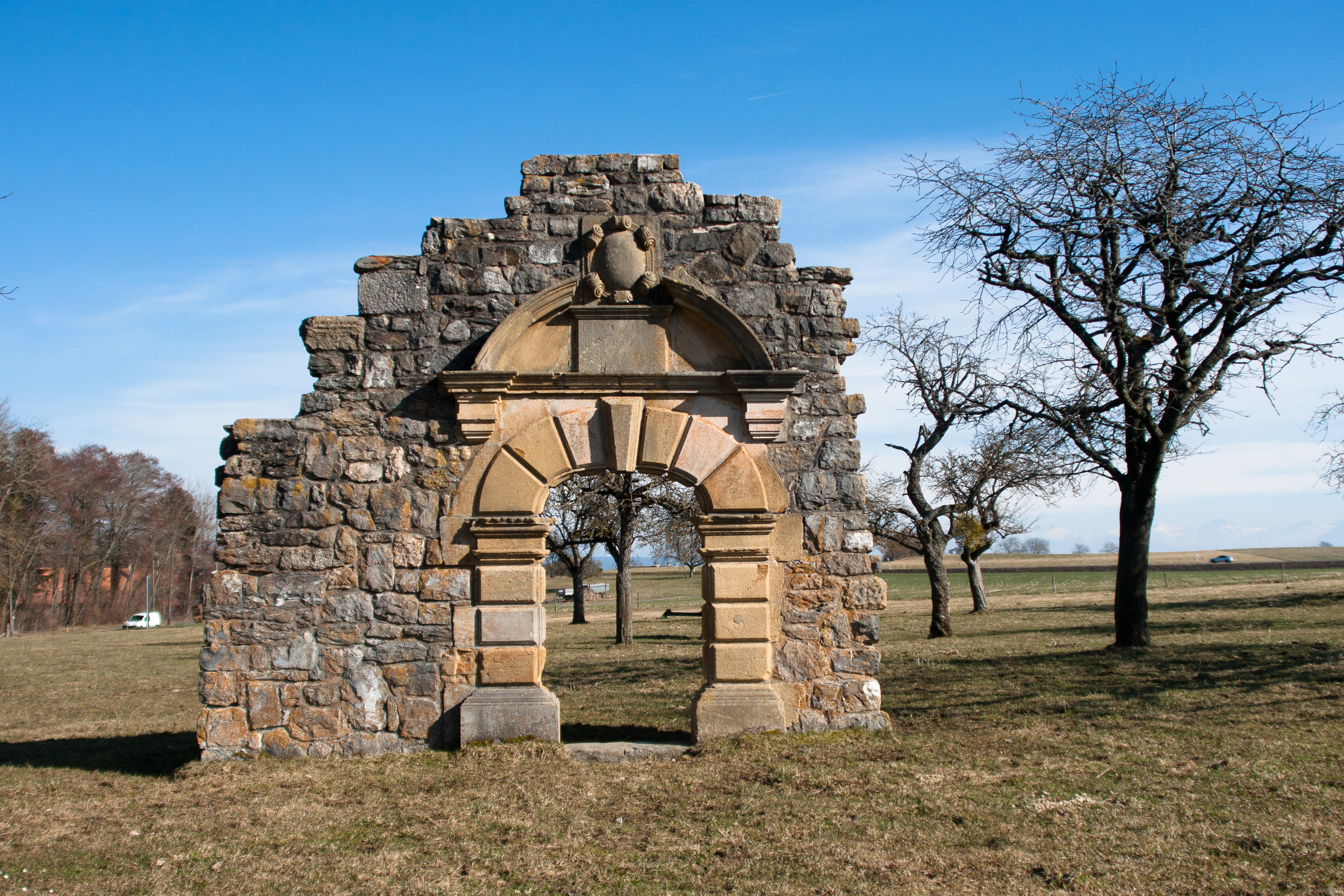

- Flag Coat of arms
- Location of Cuarnens
- Location within Switzerland Location within Canton of Vaud
- Coordinates: 46°38′N 06°26′E
- Country: Switzerland
- Canton: Vaud
- District: Morges

Government
  - Mayor: Syndic; Jean-Daniel Staub

Area
  - Total: 7.14 km^{2} (2.76 sq mi)
- Elevation: 629 m (2,064 ft)

Population (2004)
  - Total: 428
  - Density: 59.9/km^{2} (155/sq mi)
- Demonym(s): Les Cuarnenais; Les Cornichons; Lè Racene
- Time zone: UTC+01:00 (CET)
  - Summer (DST): UTC+02:00 (CEST)
- Postal code: 1148
- SFOS number: 5479
- ISO 3166 code: CH-VD
- Surrounded by: Moiry, Chavannes-le-Veyron, La Chaux (Cossonay), L'Isle, Mont-la-Ville
- Website: www.cuarnens.ch

Cuarnens is a municipality of the canton of Vaud in Switzerland, located in the district of Morges.

== History ==
Cuarnens is first mentioned in 1001 as Quarningis.

== Geography ==
Aerial view (1949)

Cuarnens has an area, as of 2009, of 7.14 square kilometers (2.76 sq mi). Of this area, 4.59 km^{2} (1.77 sq mi) or 64.3% is used for agricultural purposes, while 2.16 km^{2} (0.83 sq mi) or 30.3% is forested. Of the rest of the land, 0.33 km^{2} (0.13 sq mi) or 4.6% is settled (buildings or roads), 0.01 km^{2} (2.5 acres) or 0.1% is either rivers or lakes.

Of the built up area, housing and buildings made up 2.7% and transportation infrastructure made up 1.3%. Out of the forested land, 28.3% of the total land area is heavily forested and 2.0% is covered with orchards or small clusters of trees. Of the agricultural land, 54.3% is used for growing crops and 8.8% is pastures, while 1.1% is used for orchards or vine crops. All the water in the municipality is flowing water.

The municipality was part of the Cossonay District until it was dissolved on 31 August 2006, and Cuarnens became part of the new district of Morges.

The municipality is located at the foot of the Jura Mountains, and the Venoge river flows through the municipality.

== Coat of arms ==
The blazon of the municipal coat of arms is Azure, a Cross Argent, overall a Unicorn rampant Or.

== Demographics ==
Cuarnens has a population (as of December 2020) of 528. As of 2008, 11.3% of the population are resident foreign nationals. Over the last 10 years (1999–2009 ) the population has changed at a rate of -1.3%. It has changed at a rate of -2.6% due to migration and at a rate of 1.8% due to births and deaths.

Most of the population (as of 2000) speaks French (338 or 85.6%), with German being second most common (40 or 10.1%) and Portuguese being third (7 or 1.8%). There are 3 people who speak Italian.

Of the population in the municipality 157 or about 39.7% were born in Cuarnens and lived there in 2000. There were 137 or 34.7% who were born in the same canton, while 44 or 11.1% were born somewhere else in Switzerland, and 51 or 12.9% were born outside of Switzerland.

In 2008 there were 5 live births to Swiss citizens and were 9 deaths of Swiss citizens. Ignoring immigration and emigration, the population of Swiss citizens decreased by 4 while the foreign population remained the same. There was 1 Swiss woman who immigrated back to Switzerland. At the same time, there was 1 non-Swiss man who emigrated from Switzerland to another country and 1 non-Swiss woman who immigrated from another country to Switzerland. The total Swiss population change in 2008 (from all sources, including moves across municipal borders) was a decrease of 6 and the non-Swiss population decreased by 2 people. This represents a population growth rate of -2.1%.

The age distribution, as of 2009, in Cuarnens is; 42 children or 11.1% of the population are between 0 and 9 years old and 51 teenagers or 13.4% are between 10 and 19. Of the adult population, 53 people or 13.9% of the population are between 20 and 29 years old. 49 people or 12.9% are between 30 and 39, 51 people or 13.4% are between 40 and 49, and 61 people or 16.1% are between 50 and 59. The senior population distribution is 32 people or 8.4% of the population are between 60 and 69 years old, 24 people or 6.3% are between 70 and 79, there are 17 people or 4.5% who are between 80 and 89.

As of 2000, there were 166 people who were single and never married in the municipality. There were 195 married individuals, 18 widows or widowers and 16 individuals who are divorced.

As of 2000, there were 152 private households in the municipality, and an average of 2.6 persons per household. There were 34 households that consist of only one person and 11 households with five or more people. Out of a total of 153 households that answered this question, 22.2% were households made up of just one person and there were 4 adults who lived with their parents. Of the rest of the households, there are 46 married couples without children, 61 married couples with children There were 6 single parents with a child or children. There was 1 household that was made up of unrelated people and 1 household that was made up of some sort of institution or another collective housing.

In 2000 there were 44 single family homes (or 43.6% of the total) out of a total of 101 inhabited buildings. There were 15 multi-family buildings (14.9%), along with 35 multi-purpose buildings that were mostly used for housing (34.7%) and 7 other use buildings (commercial or industrial) that also had some housing (6.9%). Of the single family homes 26 were built before 1919, while 2 were built between 1990 and 2000. The most multi-family homes (9) were built before 1919 and the next most (3) were built between 1971 and 1980.

In 2000 there were 165 apartments in the municipality. The most common apartment size was 4 rooms of which there were 55. There were 5 single room apartments and 58 apartments with five or more rooms. Of these apartments, a total of 149 apartments (90.3% of the total) were permanently occupied, while 13 apartments (7.9%) were seasonally occupied and 3 apartments (1.8%) were empty. As of 2009, the construction rate of new housing units was 0 new units per 1000 residents. The vacancy rate for the municipality, in 2010, was 0%.

The historical population is given in the following chart:

== Sights ==
The entire village of Cuarnens is designated as part of the Inventory of Swiss Heritage Sites.

== Politics ==
In the 2007 federal election the most popular party was the SP which received 27.43% of the vote. The next three most popular parties were the SVP (27.25%), the FDP (15.56%) and the Green Party (9.01%). In the federal election, a total of 137 votes were cast, and the voter turnout was 52.5%.

== Economy ==
As of 2010, Cuarnens had an unemployment rate of 1.9%. As of 2008, there were 39 people employed in the primary economic sector and about 17 businesses involved in this sector. 21 people were employed in the secondary sector and there were 6 businesses in this sector. 31 people were employed in the tertiary sector, with 8 businesses in this sector. There were 190 residents of the municipality who were employed in some capacity, of which females made up 38.9% of the workforce.

In 2008 the total number of full-time equivalent jobs was 67. The number of jobs in the primary sector was 26, all of which were in agriculture. The number of jobs in the secondary sector was 17 of which 13 or (76.5%) were in manufacturing and 3 (17.6%) were in construction. The number of jobs in the tertiary sector was 24. In the tertiary sector; 11 or 45.8% were in wholesale or retail sales or the repair of motor vehicles, 1 was in the movement and storage of goods, 3 or 12.5% were in a hotel or restaurant, and 7 or 29.2% were in health care.

In 2000, there were 23 workers who commuted into the municipality and 131 workers who commuted away. The municipality is a net exporter of workers, with about 5.7 workers leaving the municipality for every one entering. Of the working population, 5.8% used public transportation to get to work, and 65.3% used a private car.

== Religion ==
From the 2000 census, 54 or 13.7% were Roman Catholic, while 256 or 64.8% belonged to the Swiss Reformed Church. Of the rest of the population, there were 38 individuals (or about 9.62% of the population) who belonged to another Christian church. There were 1 individual who belonged to another church. 51 (or about 12.91% of the population) belonged to no church, are agnostic or atheist, and 14 individuals (or about 3.54% of the population) did not answer the question.

== Education ==
In Cuarnens about 149 or (37.7%) of the population have completed non-mandatory upper secondary education, and 58 or (14.7%) have completed additional higher education (either university or a Fachhochschule). Of the 58 who completed tertiary schooling, 53.4% were Swiss men, 25.9% were Swiss women, 10.3% were non-Swiss men and 10.3% were non-Swiss women.

In the 2009/2010 school year there were a total of 55 students in the Cuarnens school district. In the Vaud cantonal school system, two years of non-obligatory pre-school are provided by the political districts. During the school year, the political district provided pre-school care for a total of 631 children of which 203 children (32.2%) received subsidized pre-school care. The canton's primary school program requires students to attend for four years. There were 32 students in the municipal primary school program. The obligatory lower secondary school program lasts for six years and there were 22 students in those schools. There were also 1 students who were home schooled or attended another non-traditional school.

As of 2000, there were 55 students in Cuarnens who came from another municipality, while 53 residents attended schools outside the municipality.
