= Quentin Rushenguziminega =

Swiss-Rwandan footballer (born 1991)

Personal information
- Date of birth: 13 November 1991 (age 34)
- Place of birth: La Sarraz, Switzerland
- Height: 1.84 m (6 ft 0 in)
- Position: Forward

Team information
- Current team: Echallens
- Number: 19

Senior career*
Years	Team	Apps	(Gls)
2009–2010	Lausanne-Sport	3	(0)
2010–2011	Stade Nyonnais	14	(0)
2011–2013	Echallens	34	(35)
2013–2015	Stade Lausanne-Ouchy	46	(47)
2015–2016	Lausanne-Sport	7	(1)
2016–2018	Yverdon Sport	42	(21)
2018–2019	Stade Lausanne-Ouchy	25	(3)
2019–	Echallens	1	(0)

International career^{‡}
2015–	Rwanda	5	(0)
- * Club domestic league appearances and goals as of 21:27, 6 August 2019 (UTC) ‡ National team caps and goals as of 11:02, 13 May 2017 (UTC)

Quentin Rushenguziminega (born 13 November 1991) is a professional footballer who plays as a forward for FC Echallens. Born in Switzerland, he represents Rwanda at international level.

== Career ==
Born in La Sarraz, Rushenguziminega has played club football for Lausanne-Sport, Stade Nyonnais, Echallens, Stade-Lausanne-Ouchy and Yverdon Sport.

Ahead of the 2019–20 season, Rushenguziminega rejoined FC Echallens.

He made his international debut for Rwanda in 2015.
