= Moiry, Switzerland =

Moiry
- Municipality
- Flag Coat of arms
- Location of Moiry
- Location within Switzerland Location within Canton of Vaud
- Coordinates: 46°39′N 06°27′E
- Country: Switzerland
- Canton: Vaud
- District: Morges

Government
  - Mayor: Syndic

Area
  - Total: 6.67 km^{2} (2.58 sq mi)
- Elevation: 625 m (2,051 ft)

Population (2003)
  - Total: 229
  - Density: 34.3/km^{2} (88.9/sq mi)
- Time zone: UTC+01:00 (CET)
  - Summer (DST): UTC+02:00 (CEST)
- Postal code: 1314
- SFOS number: 5490
- ISO 3166 code: CH-VD
- Surrounded by: Chevilly, Croy, Cuarnens, Ferreyres, Juriens, La Chaux (Cossonay), La Praz, Mont-la-Ville, Romainmôtier-Envy
- Website: www.moiry.ch

Moiry (French pronunciation: [mwaʁi]) is a municipality of the canton of Vaud in Switzerland, located in the district of Morges.

== History ==
Moiry is first mentioned in 1011 as in villa Moriei. In 1219 it was mentioned as Moirie.

== Geography ==
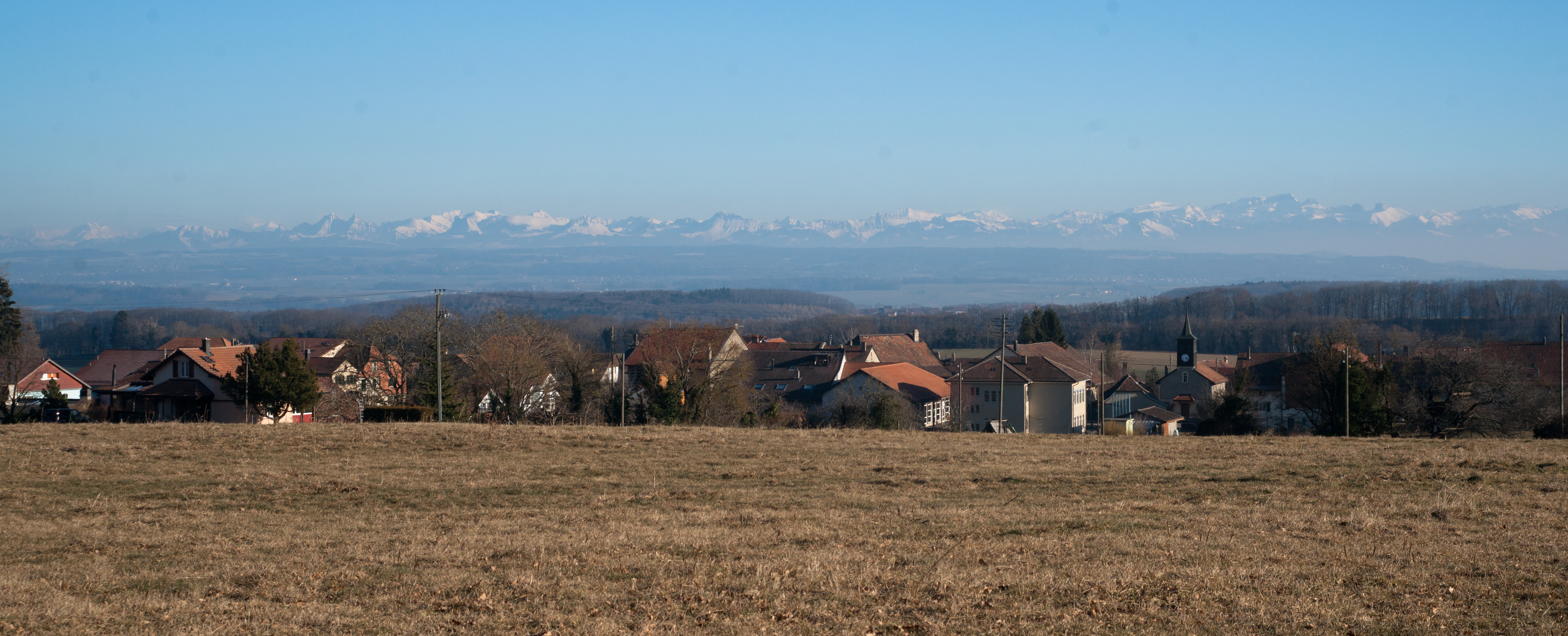
View of Moiry and the surrounding countryside

Moiry has an area, as of 2009, of 6.67 square kilometers (2.58 sq mi). Of this area, 2.77 km^{2} (1.07 sq mi) or 41.5% is used for agricultural purposes, while 3.69 km^{2} (1.42 sq mi) or 55.3% is forested. Of the rest of the land, 0.21 km^{2} (0.081 sq mi) or 3.1% is settled (buildings or roads).

Of the built up area, housing and buildings made up 1.5% and transportation infrastructure made up 1.5%. Out of the forested land, 54.0% of the total land area is heavily forested and 1.3% is covered with orchards or small clusters of trees. Of the agricultural land, 26.8% is used for growing crops and 14.2% is pastures.

The municipality was part of the Cossonay District until it was dissolved on 31 August 2006, and Moiry became part of the new district of Morges.

The municipality is located on the right bank of the Venoge river.

== Coat of arms ==
The blazon of the municipal coat of arms is Or, a Heart Gules, in Chief Gules three Mullets of Five Or.

== Demographics ==
Moiry has a population (as of December 2020) of 311. As of 2008, 10.7% of the population are resident foreign nationals. Over the last 10 years (1999–2009 ) the population has changed at a rate of 34.8%. It has changed at a rate of 36.9% due to migration and at a rate of -2% due to births and deaths.

Most of the population (as of 2000) speaks French (191 or 94.6%), with German being second most common (5 or 2.5%) and Italian being third (2 or 1.0%). There is 1 person who speaks Romansh.

Of the population in the municipality 71 or about 35.1% were born in Moiry and lived there in 2000. There were 90 or 44.6% who were born in the same canton, while 26 or 12.9% were born somewhere else in Switzerland, and 15 or 7.4% were born outside of Switzerland.

In 2008 there were 2 live births to Swiss citizens and were 2 deaths of Swiss citizens. Ignoring immigration and emigration, the population of Swiss citizens remained the same while the foreign population remained the same. The total Swiss population change in 2008 (from all sources, including moves across municipal borders) was an increase of 3 and the non-Swiss population remained the same. This represents a population growth rate of 1.2%.

The age distribution, as of 2009, in Moiry is; 37 children or 13.9% of the population are between 0 and 9 years old and 40 teenagers or 15.0% are between 10 and 19. Of the adult population, 25 people or 9.4% of the population are between 20 and 29 years old. 40 people or 15.0% are between 30 and 39, 36 people or 13.5% are between 40 and 49, and 39 people or 14.6% are between 50 and 59. The senior population distribution is 28 people or 10.5% of the population are between 60 and 69 years old, 15 people or 5.6% are between 70 and 79, there are 7 people or 2.6% who are between 80 and 89.

As of 2000, there were 83 people who were single and never married in the municipality. There were 98 married individuals, 11 widows or widowers and 10 individuals who are divorced.

As of 2000, there were 80 private households in the municipality, and an average of 2.5 persons per household. There were 26 households that consist of only one person and 9 households with five or more people. Out of a total of 81 households that answered this question, 32.1% were households made up of just one person and there was 1 adult who lived with their parents. Of the rest of the households, there are 19 married couples without children, 31 married couples with children There were 3 single parents with a child or children.

In 2000 there were 39 single family homes (or 56.5% of the total) out of a total of 69 inhabited buildings. There were 10 multi-family buildings (14.5%), along with 17 multi-purpose buildings that were mostly used for housing (24.6%) and 3 other use buildings (commercial or industrial) that also had some housing (4.3%). Of the single family homes 20 were built before 1919, while 2 were built between 1990 and 2000. The most multi-family homes (6) were built before 1919 and the next most (1) were built between 1919 and 1945. There was 1 multi-family house built between 1996 and 2000.

In 2000 there were 99 apartments in the municipality. The most common apartment size was 4 rooms of which there were 29. There were 4 single room apartments and 29 apartments with five or more rooms. Of these apartments, a total of 76 apartments (76.8% of the total) were permanently occupied, while 17 apartments (17.2%) were seasonally occupied and 6 apartments (6.1%) were empty. As of 2009, the construction rate of new housing units was 0 new units per 1000 residents. The vacancy rate for the municipality, in 2010, was 0%.

The historical population is given in the following chart:

== Politics ==
In the 2007 federal election the most popular party was the SP which received 28.37% of the vote. The next three most popular parties were the Green Party (17.36%), the SVP (15.13%) and the FDP (12.89%). In the federal election, a total of 98 votes were cast, and the voter turnout was 59.8%.

== Economy ==
As of 2010, Moiry had an unemployment rate of 5.4%. As of 2008, there were 20 people employed in the primary economic sector and about 8 businesses involved in this sector. 15 people were employed in the secondary sector and there were 4 businesses in this sector. 8 people were employed in the tertiary sector, with 3 businesses in this sector. There were 107 residents of the municipality who were employed in some capacity, of which females made up 44.9% of the workforce.

In 2008 the total number of full-time equivalent jobs was 34. The number of jobs in the primary sector was 16, of which 14 were in agriculture and 2 were in forestry or lumber production. The number of jobs in the secondary sector was 13 of which 3 or (23.1%) were in manufacturing and 10 (76.9%) were in construction. The number of jobs in the tertiary sector was 5. In the tertiary sector; 1 was in a hotel or restaurant, 1 was a technical professional or scientist, 3 or 60.0% were in education.

In 2000, there were 8 workers who commuted into the municipality and 73 workers who commuted away. The municipality is a net exporter of workers, with about 9.1 workers leaving the municipality for every one entering. Of the working population, 15.9% used public transportation to get to work, and 50.5% used a private car.

== Religion ==
From the 2000 census, 37 or 18.3% were Roman Catholic, while 124 or 61.4% belonged to the Swiss Reformed Church. Of the rest of the population, there were 30 individuals (or about 14.85% of the population) who belonged to another Christian church. 22 (or about 10.89% of the population) belonged to no church, are agnostic or atheist, and 4 individuals (or about 1.98% of the population) did not answer the question.

== Education ==
In Moiry about 78 or (38.6%) of the population have completed non-mandatory upper secondary education, and 25 or (12.4%) have completed additional higher education (either university or a Fachhochschule). Of the 25 who completed tertiary schooling, 56.0% were Swiss men, 36.0% were Swiss women.

In the 2009/2010 school year there were a total of 44 students in the Moiry school district. In the Vaud cantonal school system, two years of non-obligatory pre-school are provided by the political districts. During the school year, the political district provided pre-school care for a total of 631 children of which 203 children (32.2%) received subsidized pre-school care. The canton's primary school program requires students to attend for four years. There were 22 students in the municipal primary school program. The obligatory lower secondary school program lasts for six years and there were 21 students in those schools. There were also 1 students who were home schooled or attended another non-traditional school.

As of 2000, there were 39 students in Moiry who came from another municipality, while 35 residents attended schools outside the municipality.
