= Veyron (river) =

River in Switzerland

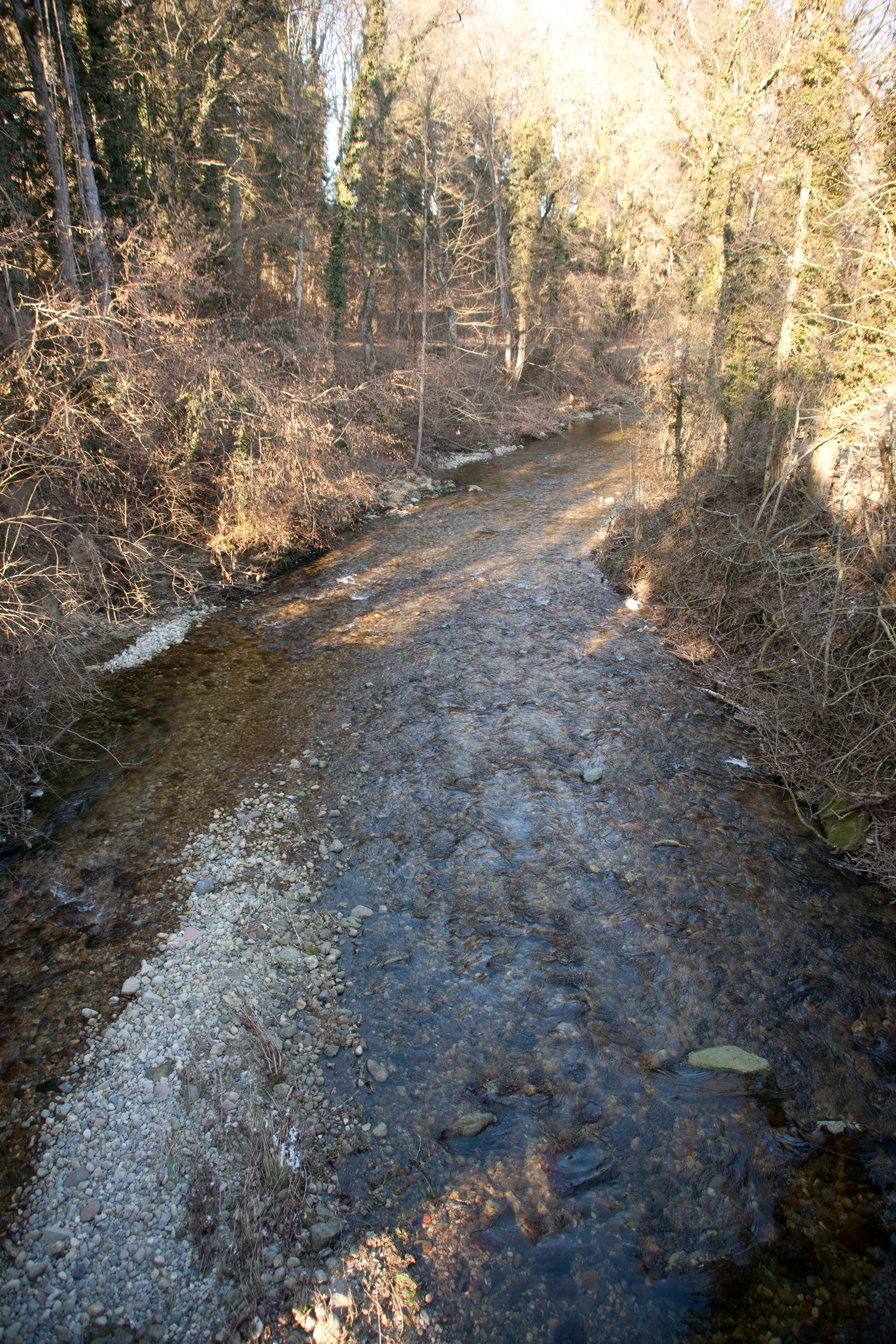
- The Veyron near Chevilly, Switzerland

Physical characteristics
- Mouth: Venoge
  - coordinates: 46°39′20″N 6°29′36″E

Basin features
- Progression: Venoge→ Lake Geneva→ Rhône→ Mediterranean Sea

The Veyron is a river in the canton of Vaud, in Switzerland.

== Geography ==
The Veyron starts its course in Bière, Vaud, and flows down to Ferreyres, where it merges into the Venoge, in the area known as Tine de Conflens.

== History ==
The Veyron was called in ancient Vaud patois "li Voirons" in 1257.

== Flows through ==
- Bière
- Ballens
- Apples
- Pampigny
- Chavannes-le-Veyron
- Grancy
- La Chaux (Cossonay)
- Dizy
- Chevilly
- La Sarraz
- Ferreyres

== Confluents ==
- the Etremble
- the Malagne
- the Morand
- the Lamponnex
- the Gèbre
