= Grancy =

- Municipality
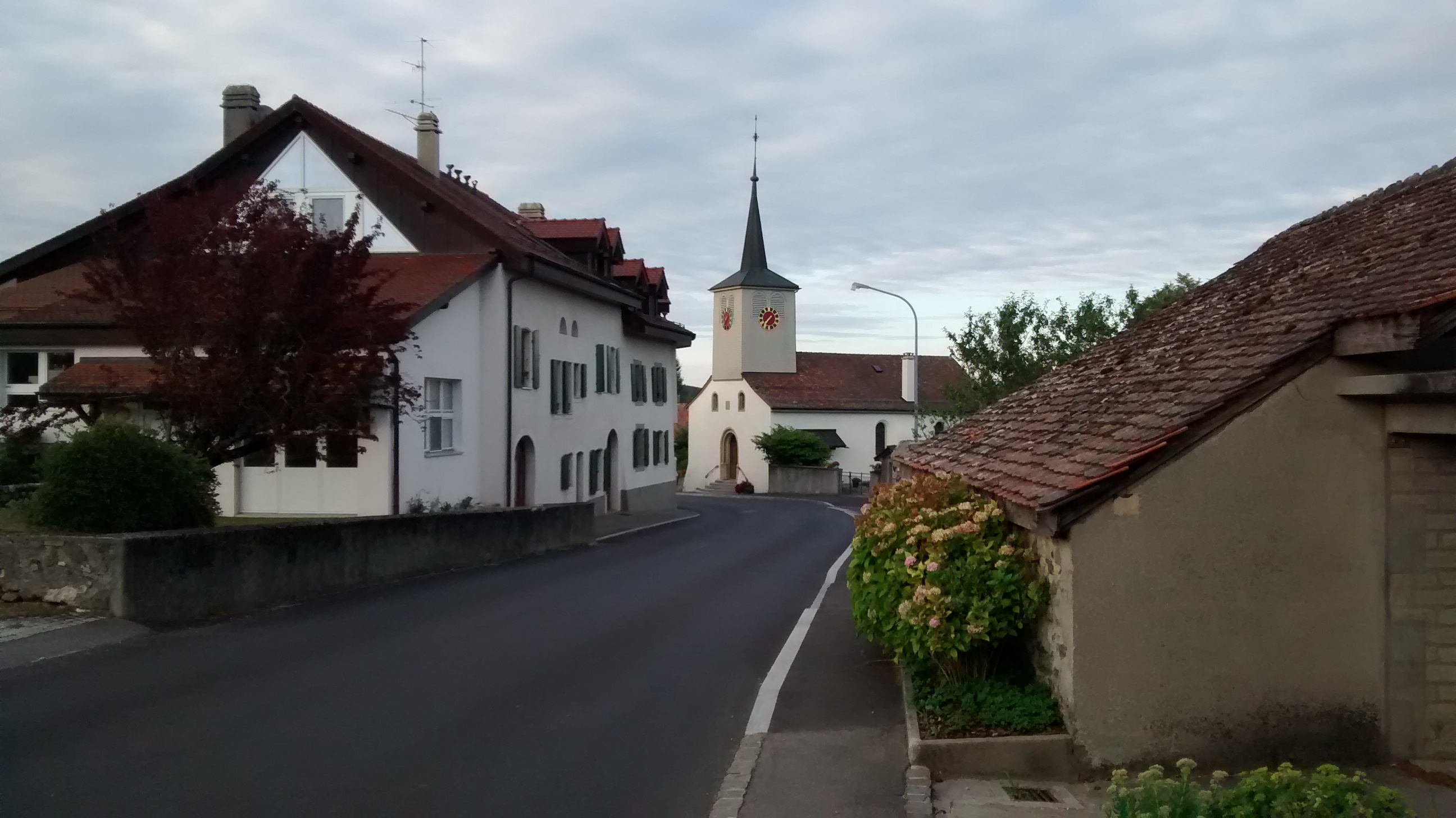

- Flag Coat of arms
- Location of Grancy
- Location within Switzerland Location within Canton of Vaud
- Coordinates: 46°35′N 06°28′E
- Country: Switzerland
- Canton: Vaud
- District: Morges

Government
  - Mayor: Syndic

Area
  - Total: 5.69 km^{2} (2.20 sq mi)
- Elevation: 581 m (1,906 ft)

Population (2003)
  - Total: 316
  - Density: 55.5/km^{2} (144/sq mi)
- Time zone: UTC+01:00 (CET)
  - Summer (DST): UTC+02:00 (CEST)
- Postal code: 1117
- SFOS number: 5485
- ISO 3166 code: CH-VD
- Surrounded by: Chavannes-le-Veyron, Cottens, La Chaux (Cossonay), Pampigny, Senarclens, Vullierens
- Website: www.grancy.ch

Grancy is a municipality of the canton of Vaud in Switzerland, located in the district of Morges.

== History ==
Grancy is first mentioned in 1141 as Granci. In 1202 it was mentioned as Grantie.

== Geography ==
Grancy has an area, as of 2009, of 5.69 square kilometers (2.20 sq mi). Of this area, 3.87 km^{2} (1.49 sq mi) or 68.0% is used for agricultural purposes, while 1.5 km^{2} (0.58 sq mi) or 26.4% is forested. Of the rest of the land, 0.27 km^{2} (0.10 sq mi) or 4.7% is settled (buildings or roads), 0.01 km^{2} (2.5 acres) or 0.2% is either rivers or lakes and 0.01 km^{2} (2.5 acres) or 0.2% is unproductive land.

Of the built up area, housing and buildings made up 3.0% and transportation infrastructure made up 1.6%. Out of the forested land, 24.8% of the total land area is heavily forested and 1.6% is covered with orchards or small clusters of trees. Of the agricultural land, 59.1% is used for growing crops and 7.6% is pastures, while 1.4% is used for orchards or vine crops. All the water in the municipality is flowing water.

The municipality was part of the Cossonay District until it was dissolved on 31 August 2006, and Grancy became part of the new district of Morges.

The municipality is located along the banks of the Veyron river. It consists of the village of Grancy and the hamlet of Saint-Denis.

== Coat of arms ==
The blazon of the municipal coat of arms is Argent, a Bar Azure ensigned letter G, in base Coupeaux Vert.

== Demographics ==
Grancy has a population (as of December 2020) of 407. As of 2008, 6.3% of the population are resident foreign nationals. Over the last 10 years (1999–2009 ) the population has changed at a rate of 15.8%. It has changed at a rate of 11.1% due to migration and at a rate of 4.7% due to births and deaths.

Most of the population (as of 2000) speaks French (302 or 92.1%), with German being second most common (13 or 4.0%) and English being third (5 or 1.5%). There are 2 people who speak Italian and 2 people who speak Romansh.

Of the population in the municipality 110 or about 33.5% were born in Grancy and lived there in 2000. There were 131 or 39.9% who were born in the same canton, while 40 or 12.2% were born somewhere else in Switzerland, and 41 or 12.5% were born outside of Switzerland.

In 2008 there were 7 live births to Swiss citizens and were 7 deaths of Swiss citizens. Ignoring immigration and emigration, the population of Swiss citizens remained the same while the foreign population remained the same. At the same time, there was 1 non-Swiss man and 1 non-Swiss woman who immigrated from another country to Switzerland. The total Swiss population change in 2008 (from all sources, including moves across municipal borders) was an increase of 3 and the non-Swiss population increased by 5 people. This represents a population growth rate of 2.2%.

The age distribution, as of 2009, in Grancy is; 52 children or 14.2% of the population are between 0 and 9 years old and 47 teenagers or 12.8% are between 10 and 19. Of the adult population, 24 people or 6.6% of the population are between 20 and 29 years old. 61 people or 16.7% are between 30 and 39, 60 people or 16.4% are between 40 and 49, and 40 people or 10.9% are between 50 and 59. The senior population distribution is 35 people or 9.6% of the population are between 60 and 69 years old, 17 people or 4.6% are between 70 and 79, there are 25 people or 6.8% who are between 80 and 89, and there are 5 people or 1.4% who are 90 and older.

As of 2000, there were 139 people who were single and never married in the municipality. There were 167 married individuals, 13 widows or widowers and 9 individuals who are divorced.

As of 2000, there were 130 private households in the municipality, and an average of 2.5 persons per household. There were 33 households that consist of only one person and 12 households with five or more people. Out of a total of 133 households that answered this question, 24.8% were households made up of just one person. Of the rest of the households, there are 41 married couples without children, 50 married couples with children There were 4 single parents with a child or children. There were 2 households that were made up of unrelated people and 3 households that were made up of some sort of institution or another collective housing.

In 2000 there were 44 single family homes (or 53.7% of the total) out of a total of 82 inhabited buildings. There were 17 multi-family buildings (20.7%), along with 16 multi-purpose buildings that were mostly used for housing (19.5%) and 5 other use buildings (commercial or industrial) that also had some housing (6.1%). Of the single family homes 18 were built before 1919, while 3 were built between 1990 and 2000. The most multi-family homes (6) were built before 1919 and the next most (4) were built between 1961 and 1970.

In 2000 there were 131 apartments in the municipality. The most common apartment size was 3 rooms of which there were 37. There were 1 single room apartments and 51 apartments with five or more rooms. Of these apartments, a total of 124 apartments (94.7% of the total) were permanently occupied, while 3 apartments (2.3%) were seasonally occupied and 4 apartments (3.1%) were empty. As of 2009, the construction rate of new housing units was 0 new units per 1000 residents. The vacancy rate for the municipality, in 2010, was 0.68%.

The historical population is given in the following chart:

== Politics ==
In the 2007 federal election the most popular party was the FDP which received 28.1% of the vote. The next three most popular parties were the SVP (22.46%), the SP (20.09%) and the Green Party (10.57%). In the federal election, a total of 117 votes were cast, and the voter turnout was 47.0%.

== Economy ==
As of 2010, Grancy had an unemployment rate of 3.5%. As of 2008, there were 30 people employed in the primary economic sector and about 9 businesses involved in this sector. 15 people were employed in the secondary sector and there were 4 businesses in this sector. 34 people were employed in the tertiary sector, with 7 businesses in this sector. There were 157 residents of the municipality who were employed in some capacity, of which females made up 43.9% of the workforce.

In 2008 the total number of full-time equivalent jobs was 56. The number of jobs in the primary sector was 19, all of which were in agriculture. The number of jobs in the secondary sector was 14 of which 1 was in manufacturing and 13 (92.9%) were in construction. The number of jobs in the tertiary sector was 23. In the tertiary sector; 6 or 26.1% were in wholesale or retail sales or the repair of motor vehicles, 1 was in the information industry, 2 or 8.7% were technical professionals or scientists, 3 or 13.0% were in education and 9 or 39.1% were in health care.

In 2000, there were 19 workers who commuted into the municipality and 120 workers who commuted away. The municipality is a net exporter of workers, with about 6.3 workers leaving the municipality for every one entering. Of the working population, 5.7% used public transportation to get to work, and 72% used a private car.

== Religion ==
From the 2000 census, 64 or 19.5% were Roman Catholic, while 207 or 63.1% belonged to the Swiss Reformed Church. Of the rest of the population, there was 1 individual who belongs to the Christian Catholic Church, and there were 21 individuals (or about 6.40% of the population) who belonged to another Christian church. There was 1 individual who was Islamic. There was 1 person who was Buddhist. 32 (or about 9.76% of the population) belonged to no church, are agnostic or atheist, and 10 individuals (or about 3.05% of the population) did not answer the question.

== Education ==
In Grancy about 115 or (35.1%) of the population have completed non-mandatory upper secondary education, and 55 or (16.8%) have completed additional higher education (either university or a Fachhochschule). Of the 55 who completed tertiary schooling, 50.9% were Swiss men, 38.2% were Swiss women.

In the 2009/2010 school year there were a total of 52 students in the Grancy school district. In the Vaud cantonal school system, two years of non-obligatory pre-school are provided by the political districts. During the school year, the political district provided pre-school care for a total of 631 children of which 203 children (32.2%) received subsidized pre-school care. The canton's primary school program requires students to attend for four years. There were 27 students in the municipal primary school program. The obligatory lower secondary school program lasts for six years and there were 25 students in those schools.

As of 2000, there were 13 students in Grancy who came from another municipality, while 47 residents attended schools outside the municipality.
