= Chavannes-le-Veyron =

- Municipality
- Flag Coat of arms
- Location of Chavannes-le-Veyron
- Location within Switzerland Location within Canton of Vaud
- Coordinates: 46°36′N 06°27′E
- Country: Switzerland
- Canton: Vaud
- District: Morges

Government
  - Mayor: Syndic

Area
  - Total: 2.63 km^{2} (1.02 sq mi)
- Elevation: 610 m (2,000 ft)

Population (2003)
  - Total: 118
  - Density: 44.9/km^{2} (116/sq mi)
- Time zone: UTC+01:00 (CET)
  - Summer (DST): UTC+02:00 (CEST)
- Postal code: 1309
- SFOS number: 5475
- ISO 3166 code: CH-VD
- Surrounded by: Cuarnens, Grancy, La Chaux (Cossonay), L'Isle, Pampigny
- Website: http://www.chavannes-le-veyron.ch Profile (in French), SFSO statistics

Chavannes-le-Veyron is a municipality in the district of Morges in the canton of Vaud in Switzerland.

== History ==
Chavannes-le-Veyron is first mentioned in 1285.

== Geography ==
Chavannes-le-Veyron has an area, as of 2009, of 2.63 square kilometers (1.02 sq mi). Of this area, 1.81 km^{2} (0.70 sq mi) or 68.8% is used for agricultural purposes, while 0.68 km^{2} (0.26 sq mi) or 25.9% is forested. Of the rest of the land, 0.16 km^{2} (0.062 sq mi) or 6.1% is settled (buildings or roads), 0.01 km^{2} (2.5 acres) or 0.4% is either rivers or lakes.

Of the built up area, housing and buildings made up 2.7% and transportation infrastructure made up 3.4%. Out of the forested land, all of the forested land area is covered with heavy forests. Of the agricultural land, 52.5% is used for growing crops and 14.4% is pastures, while 1.9% is used for orchards or vine crops. All the water in the municipality is flowing water.

The municipality was part of the Cossonay District until it was dissolved on 31 August 2006, and Chavannes-le-Veyron became part of the new district of Morges.

The municipality is located in the heights above the Veyron river (a tributary of the Venoge river).

== Coat of arms ==
The blazon of the municipal coat of arms is Azure, on a Bend wavy Argent three Minnows fesswise Or. The minnows (French: vairon) may be a canting reference to name of the river Veyron.

== Demographics ==
Chavannes-le-Veyron has a population (as of December 2020) of 152. As of 2008, 4.9% of the population are resident foreign nationals. Over the last 10 years (1999–2009 ) the population has changed at a rate of -12.1%. It has changed at a rate of -14.4% due to migration and at a rate of 2.3% due to births and deaths.

Most of the population (as of 2000) speaks French (117 or 93.6%), with German being second most common (5 or 4.0%) and Portuguese being third (2 or 1.6%).

Of the population in the municipality 49 or about 39.2% were born in Chavannes-le-Veyron and lived there in 2000. There were 46 or 36.8% who were born in the same canton, while 13 or 10.4% were born somewhere else in Switzerland, and 17 or 13.6% were born outside of Switzerland.

In 2008 there was 1 live birth to Swiss citizens and 1 death of a Swiss citizen. Ignoring immigration and emigration, the population of Swiss citizens remained the same while the foreign population remained the same. The total Swiss population change in 2008 (from all sources, including moves across municipal borders) was an increase of 4 and the non-Swiss population increased by 1 people. This represents a population growth rate of 4.2%.

The age distribution, as of 2009, in Chavannes-le-Veyron is; 13 children or 11.2% of the population are between 0 and 9 years old and 14 teenagers or 12.1% are between 10 and 19. Of the adult population, 12 people or 10.3% of the population are between 20 and 29 years old. 12 people or 10.3% are between 30 and 39, 21 people or 18.1% are between 40 and 49, and 19 people or 16.4% are between 50 and 59. The senior population distribution is 19 people or 16.4% of the population are between 60 and 69 years old, 3 people or 2.6% are between 70 and 79, there are 3 people or 2.6% who are between 80 and 89.

As of 2000, there were 54 people who were single and never married in the municipality. There were 57 married individuals, 3 widows or widowers and 11 individuals who are divorced.

As of 2000, there were 44 private households in the municipality, and an average of 2.8 persons per household. There were 7 households that consist of only one person and 8 households with five or more people. Out of a total of 44 households that answered this question, 15.9% were households made up of just one person. Of the rest of the households, there are 14 married couples without children, 20 married couples with children There were 2 single parents with a child or children. There was 1 household that was made up of unrelated people.

In 2000 there were 15 single family homes (or 51.7% of the total) out of a total of 29 inhabited buildings. There were 4 multi-family buildings (13.8%), along with 9 multi-purpose buildings that were mostly used for housing (31.0%) and 1 other use buildings (commercial or industrial) that also had some housing (3.4%). Of the single family homes 7 were built before 1919, while 1 was built between 1990 and 2000. The most multi-family homes (3) were built before 1919 and the next most (1) were built between 1919 and 1945.

In 2000 there were 43 apartments in the municipality. The most common apartment size was 4 rooms of which there were 13. There were 1 single room apartments and 20 apartments with five or more rooms. Of these apartments, a total of 42 apartments (97.7% of the total) were permanently occupied, while 1 apartment was seasonally occupied. As of 2009, the construction rate of new housing units was 0 new units per 1000 residents. The vacancy rate for the municipality, in 2010, was 4.65%.

The historical population is given in the following chart:

== Heritage sites of national significance ==
The sawmill French: Scierie is listed as a Swiss heritage site of national significance.

== Politics ==
In the 2007 federal election the most popular party was the SVP which received 32.59% of the vote. The next three most popular parties were the SP (29%), the FDP (10.53%) and the Other (9.42%). In the federal election, a total of 48 votes were cast, and the voter turnout was 54.5%.

== Economy ==
As of 2010, Chavannes-le-Veyron had an unemployment rate of 0.2%. As of 2008, there were 19 people employed in the primary economic sector and about 7 businesses involved in this sector. 1 person was employed in the secondary sector and there was 1 business in this sector. 8 people were employed in the tertiary sector, with 4 businesses in this sector. There were 72 residents of the municipality who were employed in some capacity, of which females made up 44.4% of the workforce.

In 2008 the total number of full-time equivalent jobs was 21. The number of jobs in the primary sector was 14, all of which were in agriculture. The number of jobs in the secondary sector was 1, in construction. The number of jobs in the tertiary sector was 6. In the tertiary sector; 2 or 33.3% were in wholesale or retail sales or the repair of motor vehicles, 2 or 33.3% were technical professionals or scientists and 1 was in education.

In 2000, there were 3 workers who commuted into the municipality and 45 workers who commuted away. The municipality is a net exporter of workers, with about 15.0 workers leaving the municipality for every one entering. Of the working population, 4.2% used public transportation to get to work, and 58.3% used a private car.

== Religion ==
From the 2000 census, 24 or 19.2% were Roman Catholic, while 74 or 59.2% belonged to the Swiss Reformed Church. Of the rest of the population, there were 9 individuals (or about 7.20% of the population) who belonged to another Christian church. There were 2 individuals who belonged to another church. 13 (or about 10.40% of the population) belonged to no church, are agnostic or atheist, and 3 individuals (or about 2.40% of the population) did not answer the question.

== Education ==
In Chavannes-le-Veyron about 52 or (41.6%) of the population have completed non-mandatory upper secondary education, and 19 or (15.2%) have completed additional higher education (either university or a Fachhochschule). Of the 19 who completed tertiary schooling, 47.4% were Swiss men, 36.8% were Swiss women.

In the 2009/2010 school year there were a total of 11 students in the Chavannes-le-Veyron school district. In the Vaud cantonal school system, two years of non-obligatory pre-school are provided by the political districts. During the school year, the political district provided pre-school care for a total of 631 children of which 203 children (32.2%) received subsidized pre-school care. The canton's primary school program requires students to attend for four years. There were 4 students in the municipal primary school program. The obligatory lower secondary school program lasts for six years and there were 7 students in those schools.

As of 2000, there were 9 students in Chavannes-le-Veyron who came from another municipality, while 22 residents attended schools outside the municipality.
