= Cossonay District =

District of the Canton of Vaud, Switzerland

Coordinates: 46.61°N 6.52°E

Cossonay District District de Cossonay
- District
- Flag Coat of arms

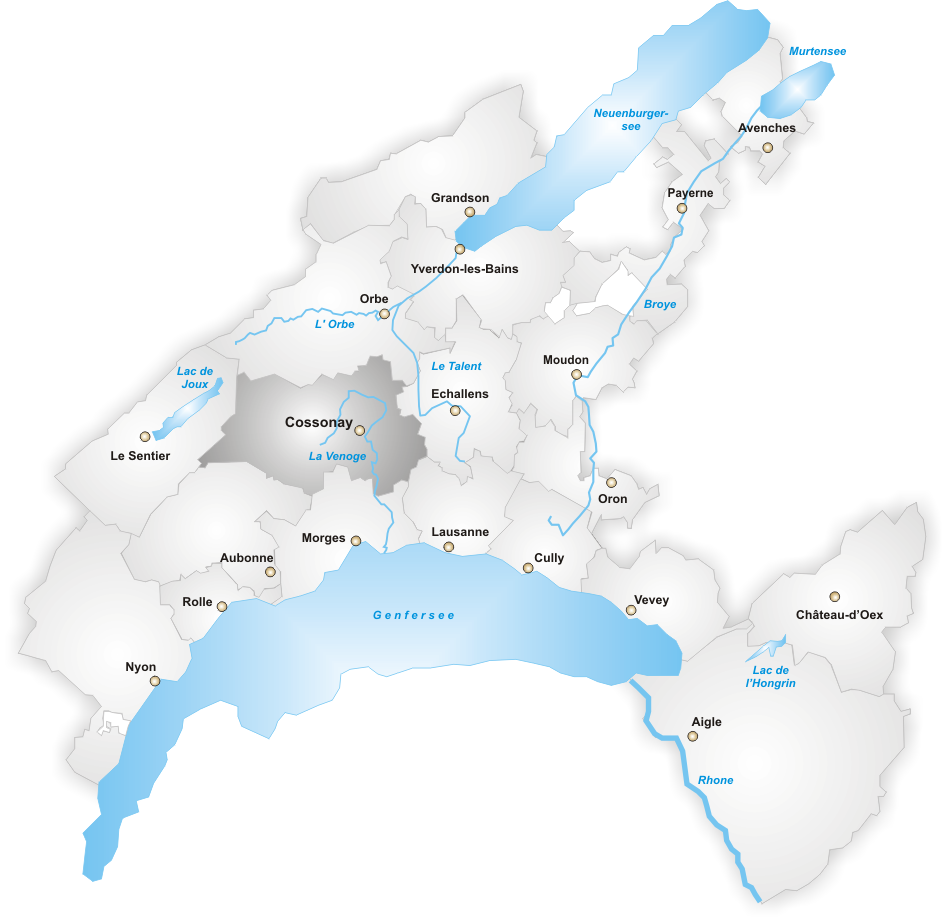
- Country: Switzerland
- Canton: Vaud
- Capital: Cossonay

Area
  - Total: 198.37 km^{2} (76.59 sq mi)

Population (2006)
  - Total: 21,720
  - Density: 109.5/km^{2} (283.6/sq mi)
- Time zone: UTC+1 (CET)
  - Summer (DST): UTC+2 (CEST)
- Municipalities: 32

Cossonay District was a district of the Canton of Vaud, Switzerland. The seat of the district was the town of Cossonay. It was dissolved on 31 August 2006.

== Mergers and name changes ==
- On 1 January 1999 the former municipalities of Villars-Lussery and Lussery merged to form the new municipality of Lussery-Villars.
- On 1 September 2006 the municipalities of Bettens, Bournens, Boussens, Daillens, Lussery-Villars, Mex (VD), Penthalaz, Penthaz, Sullens and Vufflens-la-Ville came from the District de Cossonay to join the Gros-de-Vaud District.
- On 1 September 2006 the municipalities of La Chaux (Cossonay), Chavannes-le-Veyron, Chevilly, Cossonay, Cottens (VD), Cuarnens, Dizy, Eclépens, Ferreyres, Gollion, Grancy, L'Isle, Mauraz, Moiry, Mont-la-Ville, Montricher, Orny, Pampigny, Pompaples, La Sarraz, Senarclens and Sévery came from the District de Cossonay to join the Morges District.

== Municipalities ==
Municipality	Population (2003-12-31)	Area (km²)
Bettens	287	3.73
Bournens	243	3.91
Boussens	777	3.14
Chavannes-le-Veyron	118	2.58
Chevilly	203	3.89
Cossonay	2696	8.32
Cottens	346	2.36
Cuarnens	430	7.17
Daillens	634	5.56
Dizy	207	3.03
Eclépens	915	5.81
Ferreyres	234	3.13
Gollion	615	5.44
Grancy	316	5.65
La Chaux (Cossonay)	366	6.73
La Sarraz	1739	7.77
L'Isle	864	16.25
Lussery-Villars	326	3.65
Mauraz	37	0.50
Mex	537	2.90
Moiry	229	6.66
Mont-la-Ville	331	19.75
Montricher	730	25.94
Orny	312	5.55
Pampigny	849	11.08
Penthalaz	2250	3.87
Penthaz	1359	3.91
Pompaples	677	4.45
Senarclens	335	3.98
Sévery	219	2.37
Sullens	849	3.84
Vufflens-la-Ville	1032	5.29
