= La Chaux (Cossonay) =

- Municipality
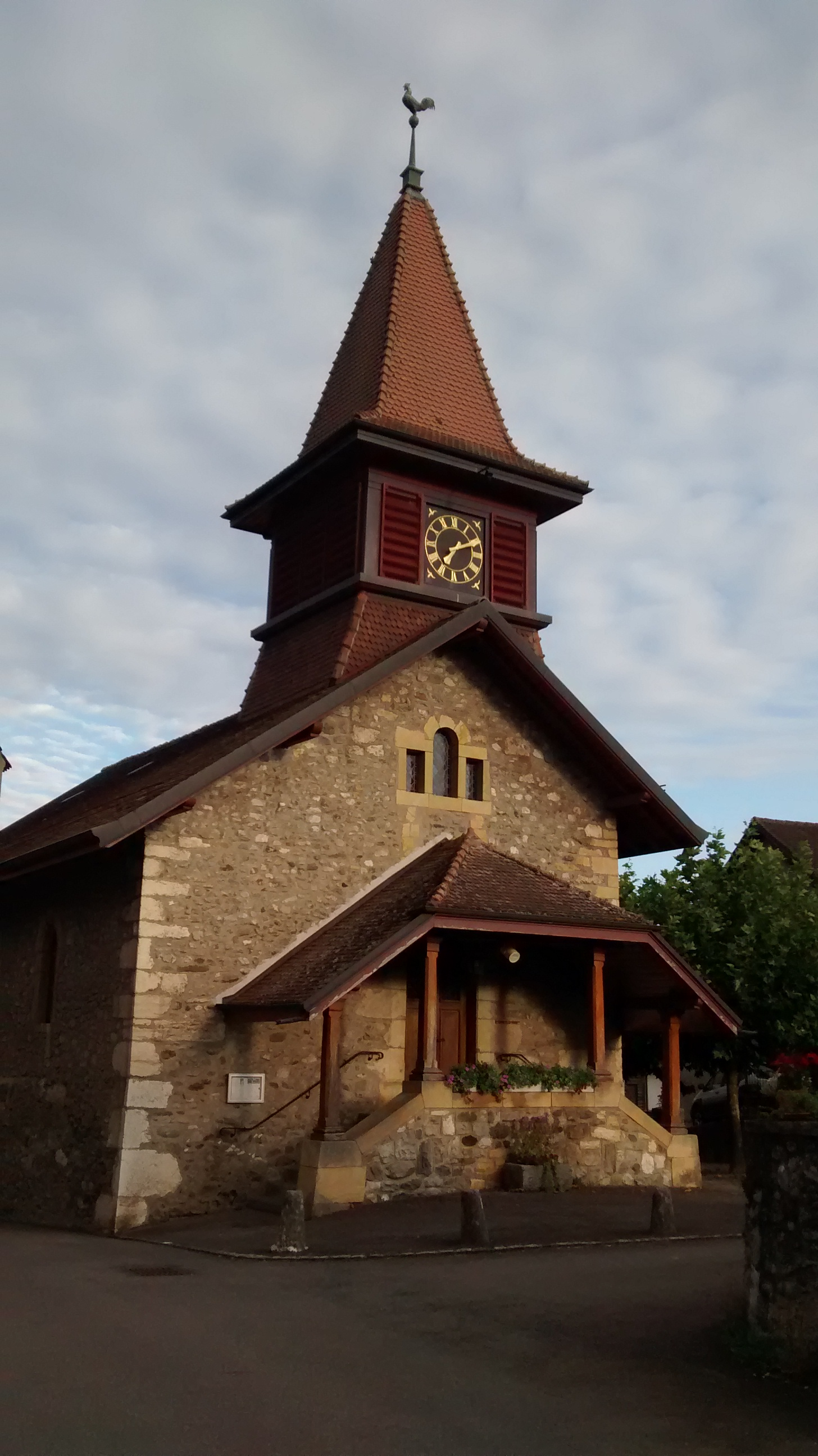

- Flag Coat of arms
- Location of La Chaux
- Location within Switzerland Location within Canton of Vaud
- Coordinates: 46°37′N 06°28′E
- Country: Switzerland
- Canton: Vaud
- District: Morges

Government
  - Mayor: Syndic

Area
  - Total: 6.75 km^{2} (2.61 sq mi)
- Elevation: 557 m (1,827 ft)

Population (2003)
  - Total: 366
  - Density: 54.2/km^{2} (140/sq mi)
- Time zone: UTC+01:00 (CET)
  - Summer (DST): UTC+02:00 (CEST)
- Postal code: 1308
- SFOS number: 5474
- ISO 3166 code: CH-VD
- Surrounded by: Chavannes-le-Veyron, Chevilly, Cossonay, Cuarnens, Dizy, Grancy, Moiry, Senarclens
- Website: www.lachaux.ch

La Chaux (French pronunciation: [la ʃo]) is a municipality of the canton of Vaud in Switzerland, located in the district of Morges.

== History ==
La Chaux is first mentioned in 1228 as La Chaus. In 1277 it was mentioned as de Calce. It was known as La Chaux (VD) until 1953.

In the 13th century the village belonged to the Knights Templar and it came into the possession of the Order of St John in 1315. It was united with the settlement at Cransaz to form a commandry which was headed by the preceptors of Vaud. The Preceptors were, until 1580, the patrons of Montbrelloz, Fribourg, and Saint-Jean de Grosset, Pays de Gex. The commandery was abolished during the Protestant Reformation.

== Geography ==
La Chaux has an area, as of 2009, of 6.75 square kilometers (2.61 sq mi). Of this area, 5.17 km^{2} (2.00 sq mi) or 76.6% is used for agricultural purposes, while 1.16 km^{2} (0.45 sq mi) or 17.2% is forested. Of the rest of the land, 0.42 km^{2} (0.16 sq mi) or 6.2% is settled (buildings or roads), 0.03 km^{2} (7.4 acres) or 0.4% is either rivers or lakes and 0.01 km^{2} (2.5 acres) or 0.1% is unproductive land.

Of the built up area, housing and buildings made up 2.5% and transportation infrastructure made up 1.6%. Power and water infrastructure as well as other special developed areas made up 1.6% of the area Out of the forested land, 15.6% of the total land area is heavily forested and 1.6% is covered with orchards or small clusters of trees. Of the agricultural land, 61.9% is used for growing crops and 13.6% is pastures. All the water in the municipality is flowing water.

The municipality was part of the Cossonay District until it was dissolved on 31 August 2006, and La Chaux became part of the new district of Morges.

The village of La Chaux is located on the left bank of the Veyron river with the village of Ittens on the right bank of the river.

== Coat of arms ==
The blazon of the municipal coat of arms is Per fess Argent and Gules, two Maltese Crosses one and one counterchanged.

== Demographics ==
La Chaux has a population (as of December 2020) of 392. As of 2008, 8.2% of the population are resident foreign nationals. Over the last 10 years (1999–2009) the population has changed at a rate of 17.4%. It has changed at a rate of 11.5% due to migration and at a rate of 6.2% due to births and deaths.

Most of the population (as of 2000) speaks French (317 or 90.1%), with German being second most common (14 or 4.0%) and Portuguese being third (7 or 2.0%). There are 4 people who speak Italian.

Of the population in the municipality 104 or about 29.5% were born in La Chaux and lived there in 2000. There were 145 or 41.2% who were born in the same canton, while 40 or 11.4% were born somewhere else in Switzerland, and 62 or 17.6% were born outside of Switzerland.

In 2008 there were 4 live births to Swiss citizens and were 4 deaths of Swiss citizens. Ignoring immigration and emigration, the population of Swiss citizens remained the same while the foreign population remained the same. At the same time, there was 1 non-Swiss man and 1 non-Swiss woman who immigrated from another country to Switzerland. The total Swiss population change in 2008 (from all sources, including moves across municipal borders) was an increase of 8 and the non-Swiss population decreased by 7 people. This represents a population growth rate of 0.3%.

The age distribution, as of 2009, in La Chaux is; 46 children or 11.5% of the population are between 0 and 9 years old and 63 teenagers or 15.8% are between 10 and 19. Of the adult population, 46 people or 11.5% of the population are between 20 and 29 years old. 57 people or 14.3% are between 30 and 39, 64 people or 16.0% are between 40 and 49, and 61 people or 15.3% are between 50 and 59. The senior population distribution is 38 people or 9.5% of the population are between 60 and 69 years old, 17 people or 4.3% are between 70 and 79, there are 5 people or 1.3% who are between 80 and 89, and there are 2 people or 0.5% who are 90 and older.

As of 2000, there were 144 people who were single and never married in the municipality. There were 173 married individuals, 15 widows or widowers and 20 individuals who are divorced.

As of 2000, there were 139 private households in the municipality, and an average of 2.5 persons per household. There were 44 households that consist of only one person and 13 households with five or more people. Out of a total of 141 households that answered this question, 31.2% were households made up of just one person. Of the rest of the households, there are 36 married couples without children, 53 married couples with children There were 6 single parents with a child or children.

In 2000 there were 43 single family homes (or 48.9% of the total) out of a total of 88 inhabited buildings. There were 25 multi-family buildings (28.4%), along with 18 multi-purpose buildings that were mostly used for housing (20.5%) and 2 other use buildings (commercial or industrial) that also had some housing (2.3%). Of the single family homes 29 were built before 1919, while 2 were built between 1990 and 2000. The most multi-family homes (13) were built before 1919 and the next most (3) were built between 1919 and 1945. There was 1 multi-family house built between 1996 and 2000.

In 2000 there were 143 apartments in the municipality. The most common apartment size was 3 rooms of which there were 42. There were 2 single room apartments and 50 apartments with five or more rooms. Of these apartments, a total of 127 apartments (88.8% of the total) were permanently occupied, while 8 apartments (5.6%) were seasonally occupied and 8 apartments (5.6%) were empty. As of 2009, the construction rate of new housing units was 5 new units per 1000 residents. The vacancy rate for the municipality, in 2010, was 0.66%.

The historical population is given in the following chart:

== Politics ==
In the 2007 federal election the most popular party was the SVP which received 23.2% of the vote. The next three most popular parties were the FDP (21.76%), the SP (18.36%) and the Green Party (17.2%). In the federal election, a total of 128 votes were cast, and the voter turnout was 51.2%.

== Economy ==
As of 2010, La Chaux had an unemployment rate of 3.5%. As of 2008, there were 32 people employed in the primary economic sector and about 15 businesses involved in this sector. 11 people were employed in the secondary sector and there were 6 businesses in this sector. 22 people were employed in the tertiary sector, with 8 businesses in this sector. There were 184 residents of the municipality who were employed in some capacity, of which females made up 42.4% of the workforce.

In 2008 the total number of full-time equivalent jobs was 53. The number of jobs in the primary sector was 24, all of which were in agriculture. The number of jobs in the secondary sector was 10 of which 3 or (30.0%) were in manufacturing and 6 (60.0%) were in construction. The number of jobs in the tertiary sector was 19. In the tertiary sector; 10 or 52.6% were in wholesale or retail sales or the repair of motor vehicles, 4 or 21.1% were in a hotel or restaurant, 2 or 10.5% were technical professionals or scientists, 1 was in education.

In 2000, there were 12 workers who commuted into the municipality and 133 workers who commuted away. The municipality is a net exporter of workers, with about 11.1 workers leaving the municipality for every one entering. Of the working population, 6% used public transportation to get to work, and 69% used a private car.

== Religion ==
From the 2000 census, 65 or 18.5% were Roman Catholic, while 192 or 54.5% belonged to the Swiss Reformed Church. Of the rest of the population, there was 1 member of an Orthodox church, and there were 32 individuals (or about 9.09% of the population) who belonged to another Christian church. 78 (or about 22.16% of the population) belonged to no church, are agnostic or atheist.

== Education ==
In La Chaux about 136 or (38.6%) of the population have completed non-mandatory upper secondary education, and 55 or (15.6%) have completed additional higher education (either university or a Fachhochschule). Of the 55 who completed tertiary schooling, 45.5% were Swiss men, 45.5% were Swiss women.

In the 2009/2010 school year there were a total of 64 students in the La Chaux school district. In the Vaud cantonal school system, two years of non-obligatory pre-school are provided by the political districts. During the school year, the political district provided pre-school care for a total of 631 children of which 203 children (32.2%) received subsidized pre-school care. The canton's primary school program requires students to attend for four years. There were 31 students in the municipal primary school program. The obligatory lower secondary school program lasts for six years and there were 33 students in those schools.

As of 2000, there were 16 students in La Chaux who came from another municipality, while 56 residents attended schools outside the municipality.
