= La Sarraz =

- Municipality
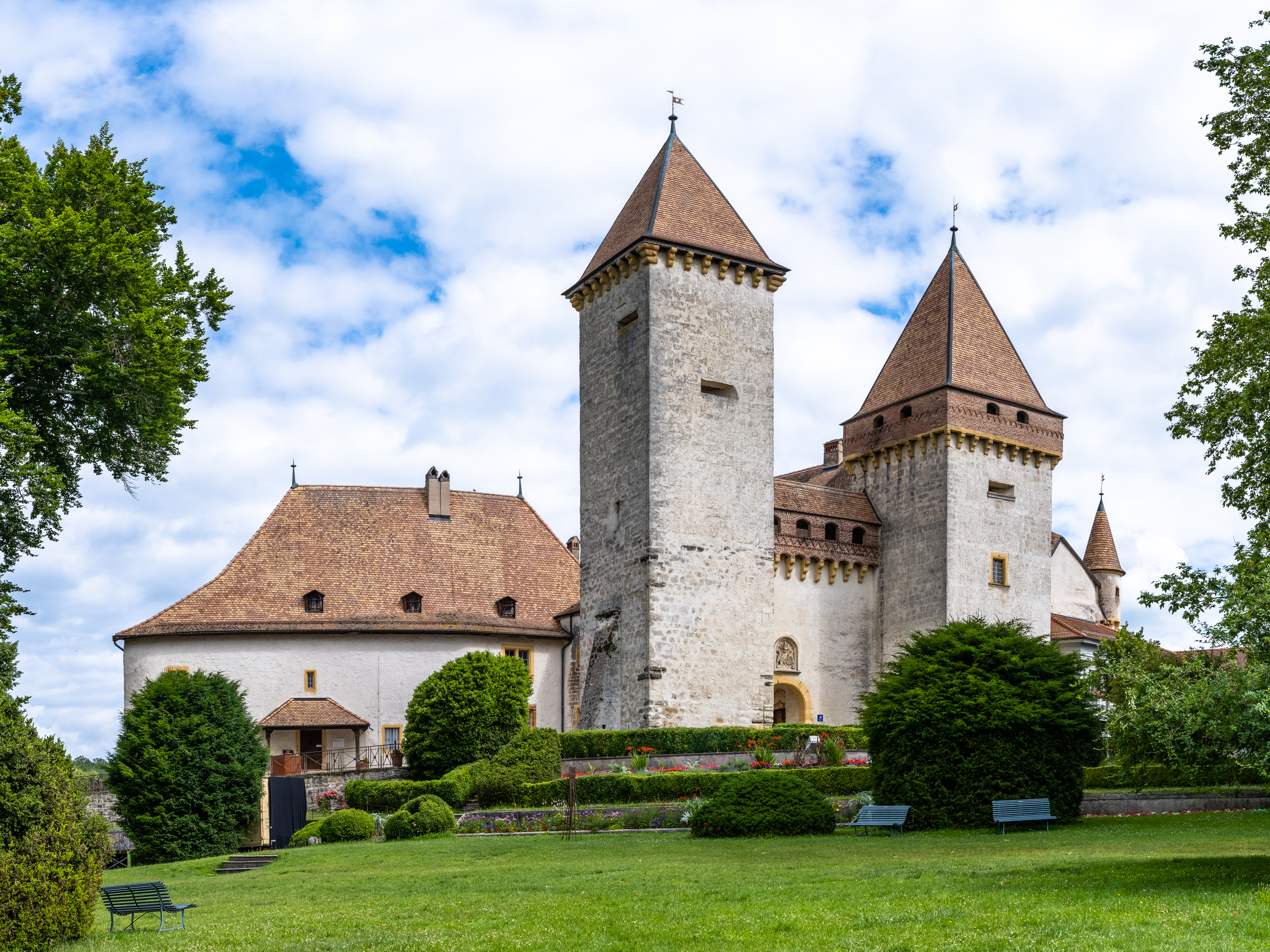
- La Sarraz Castle

- Flag Coat of arms
- Location of La Sarraz
- Location within Switzerland Location within Canton of Vaud
- Coordinates: 46°40′N 6°31′E
- Country: Switzerland
- Canton: Vaud
- District: Morges

Government
  - Mayor: Syndic; Daniel Develey

Area
  - Total: 7.71 km^{2} (2.98 sq mi)
- Elevation: 490 m (1,610 ft)

Population (2003)
  - Total: 1,739
  - Density: 226/km^{2} (584/sq mi)
- Time zone: UTC+01:00 (CET)
  - Summer (DST): UTC+02:00 (CEST)
- Postal code: 1315
- SFOS number: 5498
- ISO 3166 code: CH-VD
- Surrounded by: Arnex-sur-Orbe, Chevilly, Croy, Dizy, Eclépens, Ferreyres, Lussery-Villars, Orny, Pompaples, Romainmôtier-Envy
- Website: www.lasarraz.ch

La Sarraz is a municipality of the canton of Vaud in Switzerland, located in the district of Morges.

== History ==
La Sarraz is first mentioned in 1149 as Sarrata. It is also known as the place of establishment of Le Congrès International d'Architecture Moderne in 1928.

== Geography ==
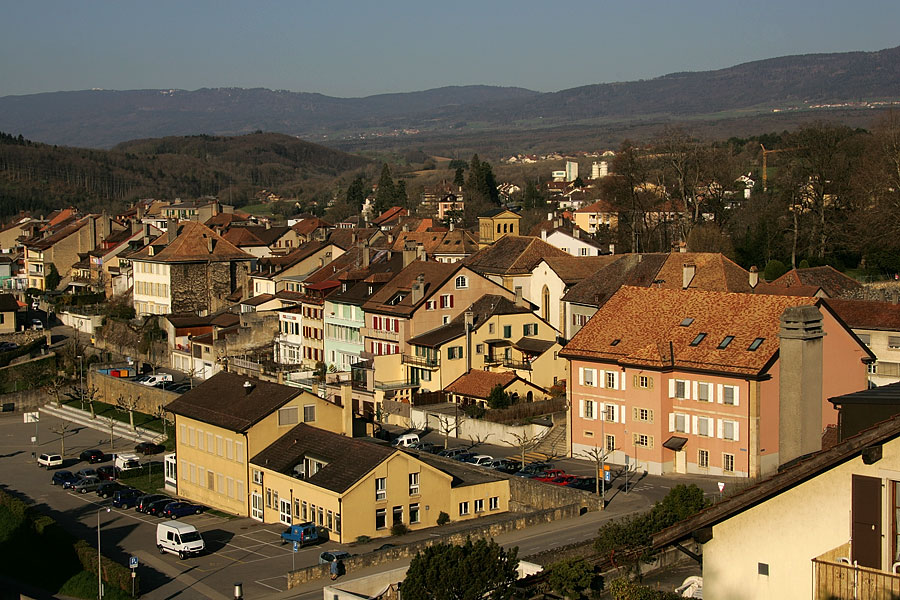
La Sarraz

Aerial view from 500 m by Walter Mittelholzer (1919)

La Sarraz has an area, as of 2009, of 7.71 square kilometers (2.98 sq mi). Of this area, 3.72 km^{2} (1.44 sq mi) or 48.2% is used for agricultural purposes, while 3.01 km^{2} (1.16 sq mi) or 39.0% is forested. Of the rest of the land, 0.92 km^{2} (0.36 sq mi) or 11.9% is settled (buildings or roads), 0.04 km^{2} (9.9 acres) or 0.5% is either rivers or lakes and 0.05 km^{2} (12 acres) or 0.6% is unproductive land.

Of the built up area, housing and buildings made up 6.0% and transportation infrastructure made up 2.5%. Power and water infrastructure as well as other special developed areas made up 1.8% of the area Out of the forested land, 36.8% of the total land area is heavily forested and 2.2% is covered with orchards or small clusters of trees. Of the agricultural land, 36.8% is used for growing crops and 10.2% is pastures, while 1.2% is used for orchards or vine crops. All the water in the municipality is flowing water.

The municipality was part of the Cossonay District until it was dissolved on 31 August 2006, and La Sarraz became part of the new district of Morges.

The municipality is located in the Venoge river, at the foot of the Mormont.

== Coat of arms ==
The blazon of the municipal coat of arms is Per pale Gules and Or, overall capital S Argent lined Sable.

== Demographics ==
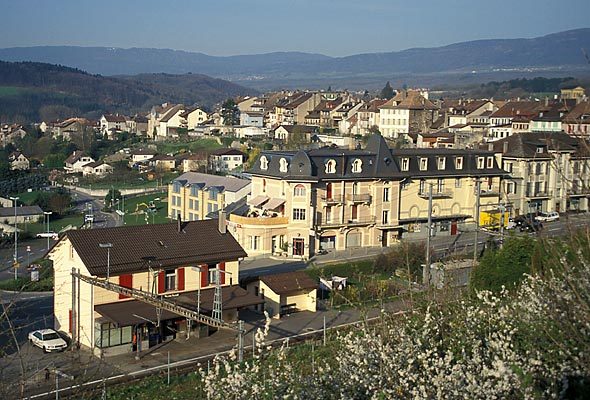
La Sarraz train station and town

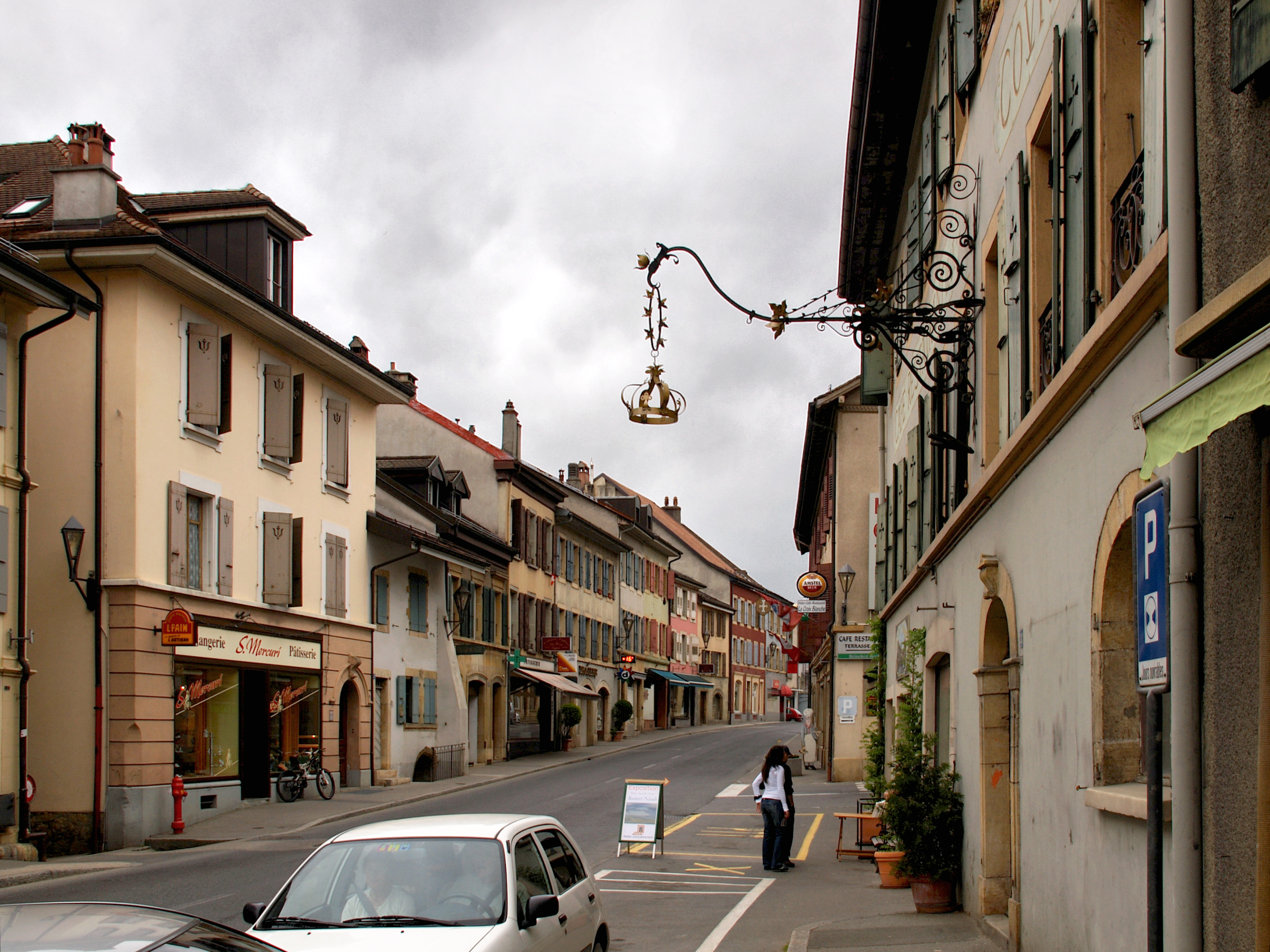
Main street of La Sarraz

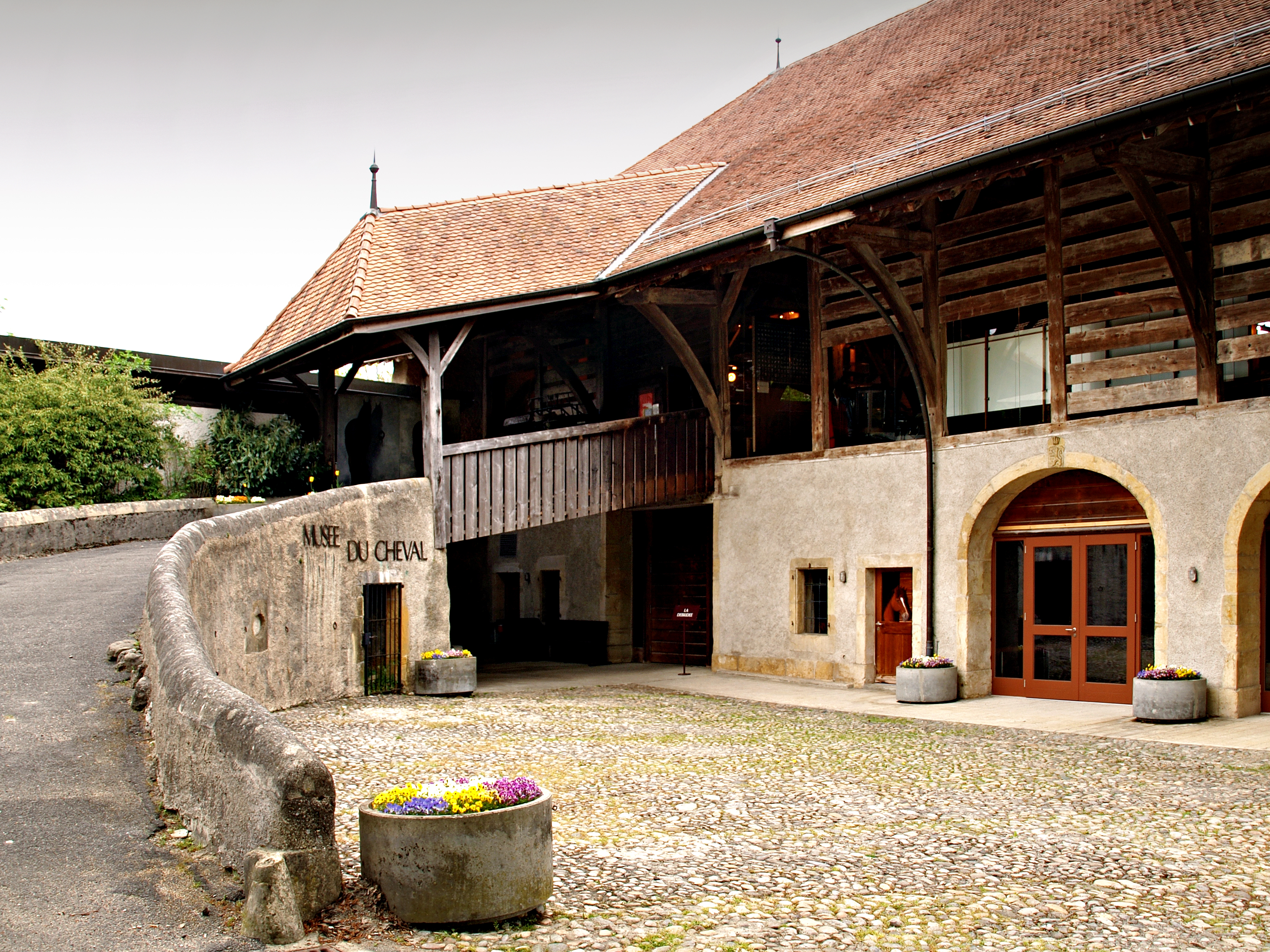
Musée du Cheval in La Sarraz

La Sarraz has a population (as of December 2020) of 2,595. As of 2008, 26.6% of the population are resident foreign nationals. Over the last 10 years (1999–2009 ) the population has changed at a rate of 29.8%. It has changed at a rate of 27.9% due to migration and at a rate of 2% due to births and deaths.

Most of the population (as of 2000) speaks French (1,461 or 84.5%), with German being second most common (79 or 4.6%) and Portuguese being third (64 or 3.7%). There are 35 people who speak Italian.

Of the population in the municipality 363 or about 21.0% were born in La Sarraz and lived there in 2000. There were 657 or 38.0% who were born in the same canton, while 237 or 13.7% were born somewhere else in Switzerland, and 420 or 24.3% were born outside of Switzerland.

In 2008 there were 16 live births to Swiss citizens and 3 births to non-Swiss citizens, and in same time span there were 19 deaths of Swiss citizens and 1 non-Swiss citizen death. Ignoring immigration and emigration, the population of Swiss citizens decreased by 3 while the foreign population increased by 2. There were 4 Swiss men who immigrated back to Switzerland and 1 Swiss woman who emigrated from Switzerland. At the same time, there were 12 non-Swiss men and 10 non-Swiss women who immigrated from another country to Switzerland. The total Swiss population change in 2008 (from all sources, including moves across municipal borders) was an increase of 45 and the non-Swiss population increased by 41 people. This represents a population growth rate of 4.9%.

The age distribution, as of 2009, in La Sarraz is; 244 children or 11.3% of the population are between 0 and 9 years old and 254 teenagers or 11.8% are between 10 and 19. Of the adult population, 316 people or 14.7% of the population are between 20 and 29 years old. 355 people or 16.5% are between 30 and 39, 343 people or 16.0% are between 40 and 49, and 264 people or 12.3% are between 50 and 59. The senior population distribution is 191 people or 8.9% of the population are between 60 and 69 years old, 108 people or 5.0% are between 70 and 79, there are 62 people or 2.9% who are between 80 and 89, and there are 13 people or 0.6% who are 90 and older.

As of 2000, there were 688 people who were single and never married in the municipality. There were 829 married individuals, 104 widows or widowers and 107 individuals who are divorced.

As of 2000, there were 738 private households in the municipality, and an average of 2.3 persons per household. There were 253 households that consist of only one person and 40 households with five or more people. Out of a total of 751 households that answered this question, 33.7% were households made up of just one person and there was 1 adult who lived with their parents. Of the rest of the households, there are 203 married couples without children, 232 married couples with children There were 43 single parents with a child or children. There were 6 households that were made up of unrelated people and 13 households that were made up of some sort of institution or another collective housing.

In 2000 there were 192 single family homes (or 53.3% of the total) out of a total of 360 inhabited buildings. There were 89 multi-family buildings (24.7%), along with 58 multi-purpose buildings that were mostly used for housing (16.1%) and 21 other use buildings (commercial or industrial) that also had some housing (5.8%). Of the single family homes 26 were built before 1919, while 16 were built between 1990 and 2000. The greatest number of single family homes (49) were built between 1981 and 1990. The most multi-family homes (34) were built before 1919 and the next most (15) were built between 1981 and 1990. There were 5 multi-family houses built between 1996 and 2000.

In 2000 there were 799 apartments in the municipality. The most common apartment size was 3 rooms of which there were 241. There were 53 single room apartments and 185 apartments with five or more rooms. Of these apartments, a total of 723 apartments (90.5% of the total) were permanently occupied, while 55 apartments (6.9%) were seasonally occupied and 21 apartments (2.6%) were empty. As of 2009, the construction rate of new housing units was 1.4 new units per 1000 residents. The vacancy rate for the municipality, in 2010, was 0.12%.

The historical population is given in the following chart:

== Notable people ==
- Quentin Rushenguziminega (born 1991 in La Sarraz) a professional footballer who plays for Yverdon Sport
- Killian Peier (born 1995 in La Sarraz) a Swiss ski jumper

== Heritage sites of national significance ==
The Chapelle Saint-Antoine and La Sarraz Castle are listed as Swiss heritage site of national significance. The entire old town of La Sarraz is part of the Inventory of Swiss Heritage Sites.

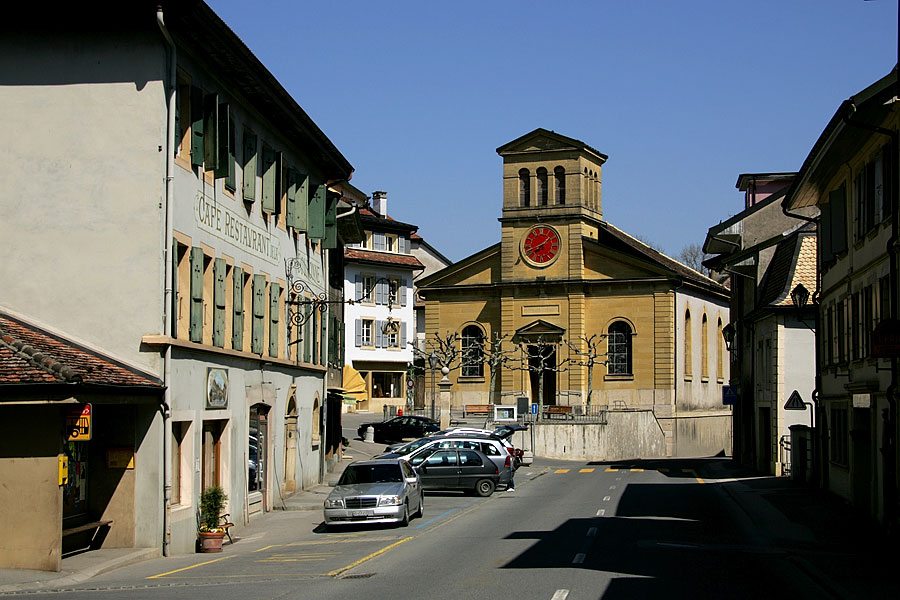
Chapelle Saint-Antoine

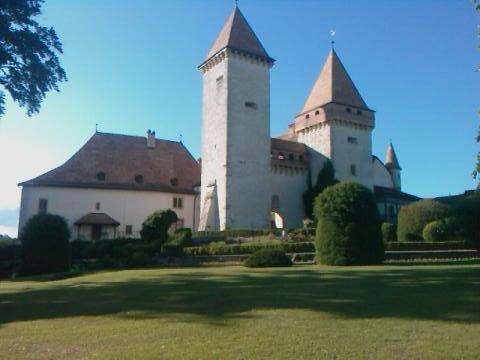
La Sarraz Castle

== Politics ==
In the 2007 federal election the most popular party was the SVP which received 22.25% of the vote. The next three most popular parties were the SP (19.86%), the FDP (19.03%) and the Green Party (16.38%). In the federal election, a total of 478 votes were cast, and the voter turnout was 45.4%.

== Economy ==
As of 2010, La Sarraz had an unemployment rate of 5.8%. As of 2008, there were 19 people employed in the primary economic sector and about 8 businesses involved in this sector. 160 people were employed in the secondary sector and there were 23 businesses in this sector. 376 people were employed in the tertiary sector, with 65 businesses in this sector. There were 909 residents of the municipality who were employed in some capacity, of which females made up 44.4% of the workforce.

In 2008 the total number of full-time equivalent jobs was 471. The number of jobs in the primary sector was 12, all of which were in agriculture. The number of jobs in the secondary sector was 153 of which 36 or (23.5%) were in manufacturing, 16 or (10.5%) were in mining and 100 (65.4%) were in construction. The number of jobs in the tertiary sector was 306. In the tertiary sector; 80 or 26.1% were in wholesale or retail sales or the repair of motor vehicles, 15 or 4.9% were in the movement and storage of goods, 19 or 6.2% were in a hotel or restaurant, 4 or 1.3% were in the information industry, 13 or 4.2% were the insurance or financial industry, 18 or 5.9% were technical professionals or scientists, 52 or 17.0% were in education and 12 or 3.9% were in health care.

In 2000, there were 408 workers who commuted into the municipality and 633 workers who commuted away. The municipality is a net exporter of workers, with about 1.6 workers leaving the municipality for every one entering. About 4.9% of the workforce coming into La Sarraz are coming from outside Switzerland. Of the working population, 11.3% used public transportation to get to work, and 63.5% used a private car.

== Religion ==
From the 2000 census, 445 or 25.8% were Roman Catholic, while 840 or 48.6% belonged to the Swiss Reformed Church. Of the rest of the population, there were 10 members of an Orthodox church (or about 0.58% of the population), and there were 39 individuals (or about 2.26% of the population) who belonged to another Christian church. There was 1 individual who was Jewish, and 109 (or about 6.31% of the population) who were Islamic. There was 1 person who was Buddhist and 5 individuals who belonged to another church. 175 (or about 10.13% of the population) belonged to no church, are agnostic or atheist, and 122 individuals (or about 7.06% of the population) did not answer the question.

== Education ==
In La Sarraz about 586 or (33.9%) of the population have completed non-mandatory upper secondary education, and 217 or (12.6%) have completed additional higher education (either university or a Fachhochschule). Of the 217 who completed tertiary schooling, 58.1% were Swiss men, 25.3% were Swiss women, 9.7% were non-Swiss men and 6.9% were non-Swiss women.

In the 2009/2010 school year there were a total of 274 students in the La Sarraz school district. In the Vaud cantonal school system, two years of non-obligatory pre-school are provided by the political districts. During the school year, the political district provided pre-school care for a total of 631 children of which 203 children (32.2%) received subsidized pre-school care. The canton's primary school program requires students to attend for four years. There were 152 students in the municipal primary school program. The obligatory lower secondary school program lasts for six years and there were 117 students in those schools. There were also 5 students who were home schooled or attended another non-traditional school.

As of 2000, there were 180 students in La Sarraz who came from another municipality, while 84 residents attended schools outside the municipality.

== Transportation ==
The municipality has a railway station, La Sarraz, on the Simplon line. It has regular service to Vallorbe, Lausanne, and Aigle.
