= Ferreyres =

- Municipality
- Flag Coat of arms
- Location of Ferreyres
- Location within Switzerland Location within Canton of Vaud
- Coordinates: 46°40′N 06°29′E
- Country: Switzerland
- Canton: Vaud
- District: Morges

Government
  - Mayor: Syndic

Area
  - Total: 3.15 km^{2} (1.22 sq mi)
- Elevation: 560 m (1,840 ft)

Population (2003)
  - Total: 234
  - Density: 74.3/km^{2} (192/sq mi)
- Time zone: UTC+01:00 (CET)
  - Summer (DST): UTC+02:00 (CEST)
- Postal code: 1313
- SFOS number: 5483
- ISO 3166 code: CH-VD
- Surrounded by: Chevilly, Croy, La Sarraz, Moiry, Romainmôtier-Envy
- Website: www.ferreyres.ch

Ferreyres is a municipality of the canton of Vaud in Switzerland, located in the district of Morges.

== History ==
Ferreyres is first mentioned in 814 as Forrarias. In 1011 it was mentioned as Ferrieris.

== Geography ==
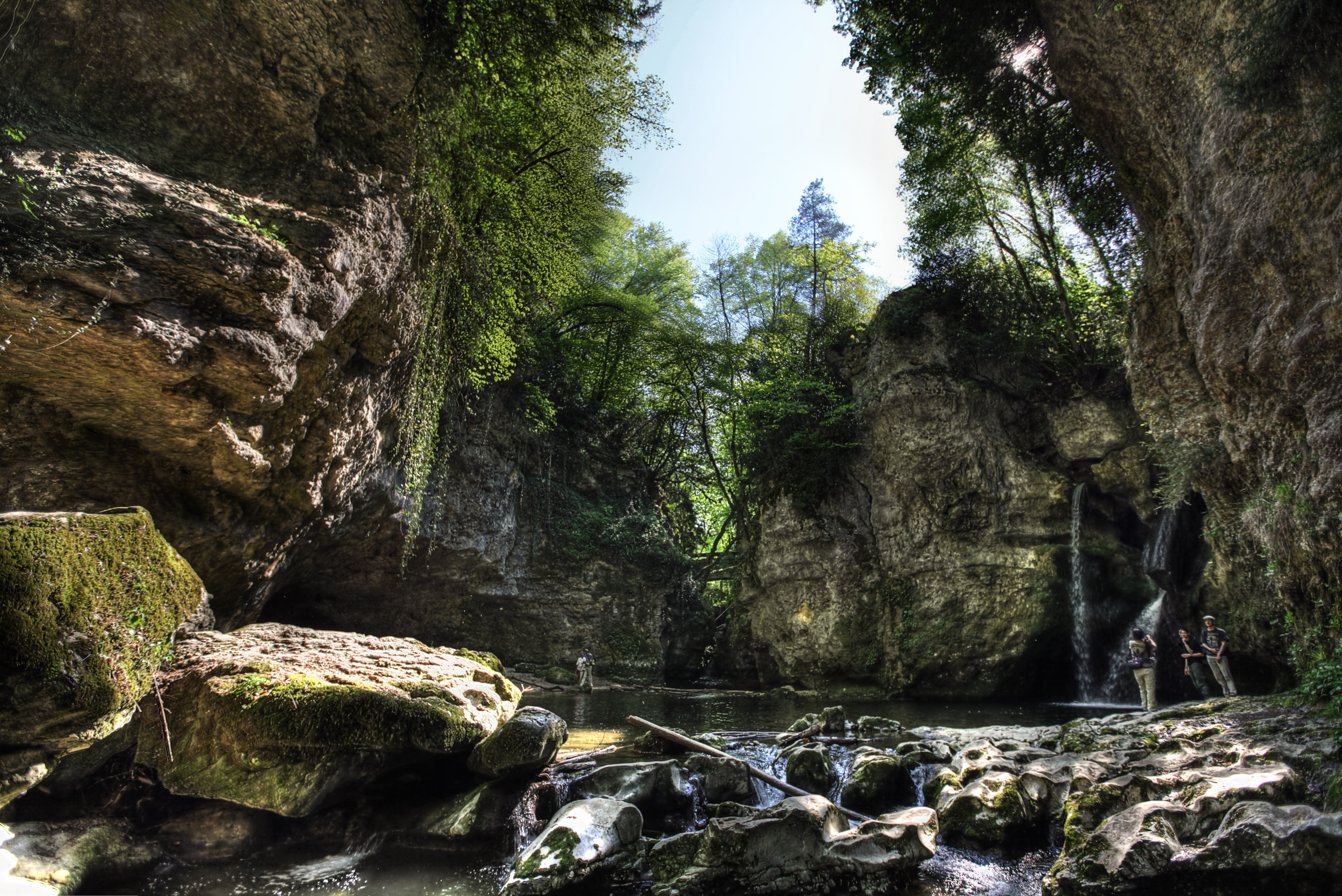
Tine de Conflens in Ferreyres

Ferreyres has an area, as of 2009, of 3.15 square kilometers (1.22 sq mi). Of this area, 1.66 km^{2} (0.64 sq mi) or 52.7% is used for agricultural purposes, while 1.31 km^{2} (0.51 sq mi) or 41.6% is forested. Of the rest of the land, 0.19 km^{2} (0.073 sq mi) or 6.0% is settled (buildings or roads), 0.01 km^{2} (2.5 acres) or 0.3% is either rivers or lakes and 0.02 km^{2} (4.9 acres) or 0.6% is unproductive land.

Of the built up area, housing and buildings made up 3.2% and transportation infrastructure made up 2.9%. Out of the forested land, 38.4% of the total land area is heavily forested and 3.2% is covered with orchards or small clusters of trees. Of the agricultural land, 30.8% is used for growing crops and 21.3% is pastures. All the water in the municipality is flowing water.

The municipality was part of the Cossonay District until it was dissolved on 31 August 2006, and Ferreyres became part of the new district of Morges.

The municipality is located on the northern slope of the Venoge valley.

== Coat of arms ==
The blazon of the municipal coat of arms is Azure, a Horse-shoe Or.

== Demographics ==
Ferreyres has a population (as of December 2020) of 319. As of 2008, 5.7% of the population are resident foreign nationals. Over the last 10 years (1999–2009 ) the population has changed at a rate of 30.3%. It has changed at a rate of 20.2% due to migration and at a rate of 10.1% due to births and deaths.

Most of the population (as of 2000) speaks French (199 or 89.6%), with German being second most common (12 or 5.4%) and Italian being third (5 or 2.3%).

Of the population in the municipality 68 or about 30.6% were born in Ferreyres and lived there in 2000. There were 99 or 44.6% who were born in the same canton, while 30 or 13.5% were born somewhere else in Switzerland, and 23 or 10.4% were born outside of Switzerland.

In 2008 there were 5 live births to Swiss citizens and 1 death of a Swiss citizen. Ignoring immigration and emigration, the population of Swiss citizens increased by 4 while the foreign population remained the same. There were 2 Swiss women who immigrated back to Switzerland. The total Swiss population change in 2008 (from all sources, including moves across municipal borders) was an increase of 35 and the non-Swiss population decreased by 3 people. This represents a population growth rate of 12.0%.

The age distribution, as of 2009, in Ferreyres is; 36 children or 12.1% of the population are between 0 and 9 years old and 51 teenagers or 17.2% are between 10 and 19. Of the adult population, 22 people or 7.4% of the population are between 20 and 29 years old. 55 people or 18.5% are between 30 and 39, 53 people or 17.8% are between 40 and 49, and 43 people or 14.5% are between 50 and 59. The senior population distribution is 30 people or 10.1% of the population are between 60 and 69 years old, 6 people or 2.0% are between 70 and 79, there is 1 person who is 80 and 89.

As of 2000, there were 87 people who were single and never married in the municipality. There were 116 married individuals, 8 widows or widowers and 11 individuals who are divorced.

As of 2000, there were 85 private households in the municipality, and an average of 2.6 persons per household. There were 23 households that consist of only one person and 6 households with five or more people. Out of a total of 87 households that answered this question, 26.4% were households made up of just one person. Of the rest of the households, there are 26 married couples without children, 33 married couples with children There were 2 single parents with a child or children. There was 1 household that was made up of unrelated people and 2 households that were made up of some sort of institution or another collective housing.

In 2000 there were 42 single family homes (or 62.7% of the total) out of a total of 67 inhabited buildings. There were 11 multi-family buildings (16.4%), along with 12 multi-purpose buildings that were mostly used for housing (17.9%) and 2 other use buildings (commercial or industrial) that also had some housing (3.0%). Of the single family homes 20 were built before 1919, while 8 were built between 1990 and 2000. The most multi-family homes (4) were built before 1919 and the next most (3) were built between 1981 and 1990. There were 2 multi-family houses built between 1996 and 2000.

In 2000 there were 91 apartments in the municipality. The most common apartment size was 4 rooms of which there were 27. There were 4 single room apartments and 33 apartments with five or more rooms. Of these apartments, a total of 82 apartments (90.1% of the total) were permanently occupied, while 7 apartments (7.7%) were seasonally occupied and 2 apartments (2.2%) were empty. As of 2009, the construction rate of new housing units was 6.7 new units per 1000 residents. The vacancy rate for the municipality, in 2010, was 0%.

The historical population is given in the following chart:

== Sights ==
The entire village of Ferreyres is designated as part of the Inventory of Swiss Heritage Sites.

== Politics ==
In the 2007 federal election the most popular party was the SVP which received 23.95% of the vote. The next three most popular parties were the Green Party (23.22%), the SP (21.23%) and the FDP (9.29%). In the federal election, a total of 87 votes were cast, and the voter turnout was 47.8%.

== Economy ==
As of 2010, Ferreyres had an unemployment rate of 3.2%. As of 2008, there were 12 people employed in the primary economic sector and about 4 businesses involved in this sector. 13 people were employed in the secondary sector and there were 4 businesses in this sector. 19 people were employed in the tertiary sector, with 5 businesses in this sector. There were 119 residents of the municipality who were employed in some capacity, of which females made up 42.0% of the workforce.

In 2008 the total number of full-time equivalent jobs was 35. The number of jobs in the primary sector was 9, all of which were in agriculture. The number of jobs in the secondary sector was 11 of which 4 or (36.4%) were in manufacturing and 6 (54.5%) were in construction. The number of jobs in the tertiary sector was 15. In the tertiary sector; 8 or 53.3% were in wholesale or retail sales or the repair of motor vehicles, 1 was in the movement and storage of goods, 4 or 26.7% were in a hotel or restaurant, 1 was a technical professional or scientist, .

In 2000, there were 14 workers who commuted into the municipality and 87 workers who commuted away. The municipality is a net exporter of workers, with about 6.2 workers leaving the municipality for every one entering. Of the working population, 6.7% used public transportation to get to work, and 73.9% used a private car.

== Religion ==
From the 2000 census, 36 or 16.2% were Roman Catholic, while 145 or 65.3% belonged to the Swiss Reformed Church. Of the rest of the population, there were 6 individuals (or about 2.70% of the population) who belonged to another Christian church. 34 (or about 15.32% of the population) belonged to no church, are agnostic or atheist, and 4 individuals (or about 1.80% of the population) did not answer the question.

== Education ==
In Ferreyres about 95 or (42.8%) of the population have completed non-mandatory upper secondary education, and 31 or (14.0%) have completed additional higher education (either university or a Fachhochschule). Of the 31 who completed tertiary schooling, 51.6% were Swiss men, 38.7% were Swiss women.

In the 2009/2010 school year there were a total of 41 students in the Ferreyres school district. In the Vaud cantonal school system, two years of non-obligatory pre-school are provided by the political districts. During the school year, the political district provided pre-school care for a total of 631 children of which 203 children (32.2%) received subsidized pre-school care. The canton's primary school program requires students to attend for four years. There were 20 students in the municipal primary school program. The obligatory lower secondary school program lasts for six years and there were 21 students in those schools.

As of 2000, there were 46 students from Ferreyres who attended schools outside the municipality.
