= Venoge (river) =

River in Switzerland

- The mouth of the Venoge and Lake Geneva
- Native name: La Venoge (French)

Physical characteristics
- Source: L'Isle
  - location: Switzerland
  - elevation: 700 m (2,300 ft)
- Mouth: Lake Geneva
  - location: Saint-Sulpice
  - coordinates: 46.5074°N 6.5394°E
  - elevation: 380 m (1,250 ft)
- Length: 38 km (24 mi)
- Basin size: 238 km^{2} (92 sq mi)

Basin features
- Progression: Lake Geneva→ Rhône→ Mediterranean Sea

The Venoge (French pronunciation: [vənɔʒ]) is a Swiss river located in the canton of Vaud, a tributary of the Rhône, via Lake Geneva. The Swiss poet Jean Villard wrote a poem about it, La Venoge, in 1954.

== Geography ==
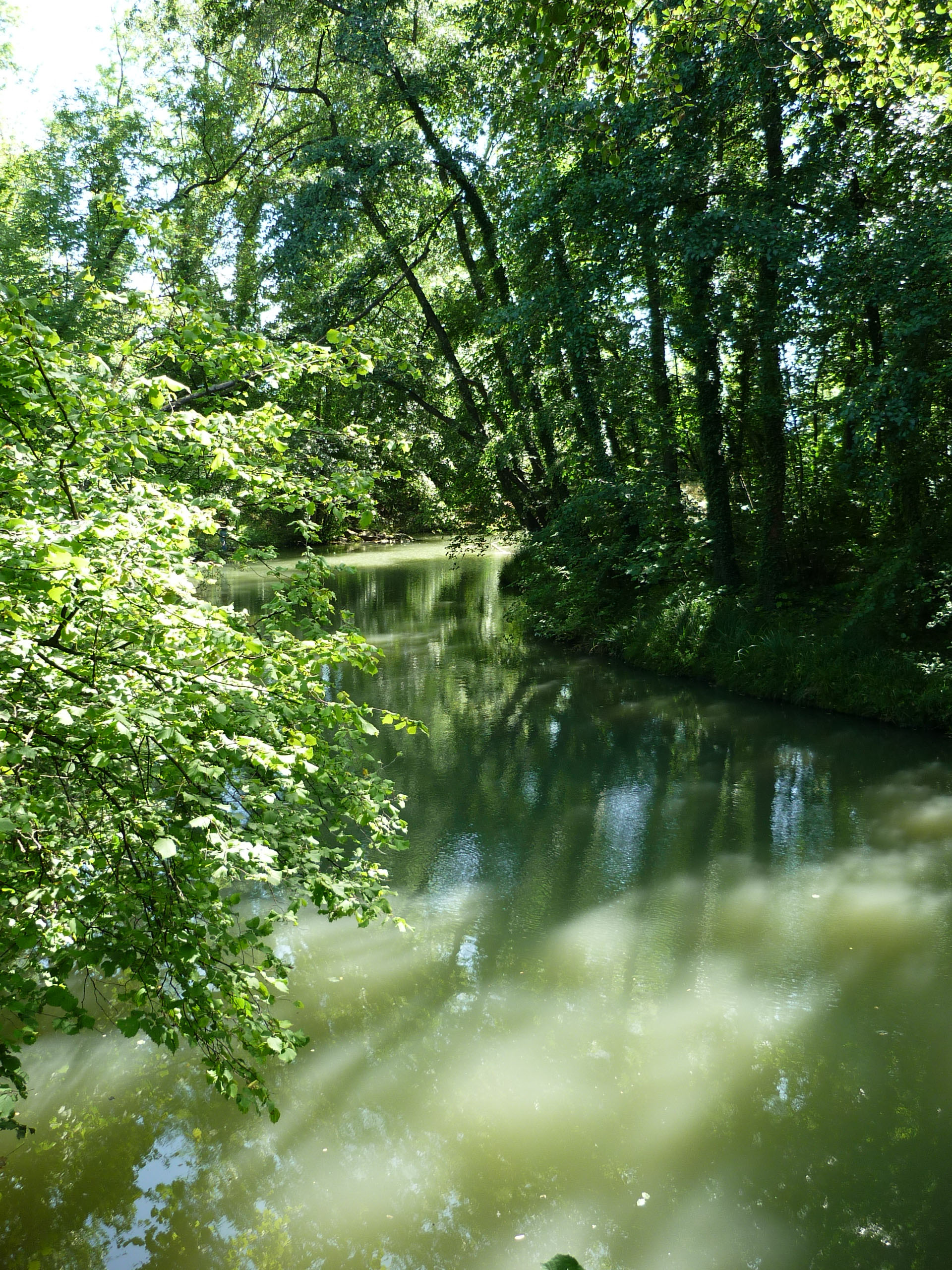
The course of the river, near Saint-Sulpice

The Venoge has its source at L'Isle in the canton of Vaud and flows down to Lake Geneva, at Saint-Sulpice. It is 38 km (24 mi) long, and its basin area is 238 km^{2} (92 sq mi).

=== Course ===
Between its source in L'Isle and Lake Geneva, la Venoge runs through Cuarnens, La Chaux, Moiry, Chevilly, Ferreyres, La Sarraz, Éclépens, Lussery-Villars, Daillens, Cossonay, Penthalaz, Penthaz, Gollion, Vufflens-la-Ville, Aclens, Bussigny-près-Lausanne, Bremblens, Échandens, Écublens, Denges, Préverenges to finally reach Saint-Sulpice.

=== Tributaries ===
- Le Veyron
- La Molombe
- La Senoge

== History ==
The Venoge was called Venobia in 814, Venubia in 937, Vinogia in 7th century, Venopia in 1313 and Venogy in 1316. Its name is probably of Celtic origin.

In 1913 it was described as splitting at La Sarraz, with the smaller part joining to the Mozon, which flows into Lake Neuchâtel at Yverdon-les-Bains, and the main part turning to the south and flowing into Lake Geneva east of Morges.

The river has been subject to heavy pollution during the 20th century. The building of more and better sewage plants along its course has led to an improvement since 1990.

== See also ==
- List of rivers of Switzerland
