= Benjamin Louis Monod de Froideville =

Swiss military officer (1714–1797)

- Born: 20 February 1714; Froideville, Ballens
- Died: 16 July 1797 (aged 83); Ballens
- Military career
- Allegiance: Kingdom of Prussia; Canton of Bern
- Rank: Colonel
- Commands: Bernese dragoons
- Conflicts: Chenaux uprising (1781)

Benjamin Louis Monod de Froideville (20 February 1714, Froideville, in the municipality of Ballens – 16 July 1797, Ballens) was a Swiss military officer and lord of Froideville. The son of Gabriel Monod, châtelain of Bière, and Susanne de Crousaz de Prélaz, he was the brother of Gabriel Monod de Froideville and François Isaac Monod de Froideville.

== Career ==
Monod de Froideville served as major in the Prussian army (1759), then as lieutenant colonel (1765) and finally colonel. He later returned to the Pays de Vaud, where he became inspector general of the Bernese cavalry and a member of the Council of Two Hundred of Lausanne (1772–1782). In 1781 he commanded the Bernese dragoons sent to assist Fribourg in suppressing the Chenaux uprising. He was an honorary member of the Economic Society of Bern from 1768.

== Bibliography ==
=== Archival sources ===
- Genealogical file, Archives cantonales vaudoises (ACV).
