= François Isaac Monod de Froideville =

Swiss military officer (1720–1794)

- Born: 12 May 1720; Froideville, Ballens
- Died: 1794 (aged 73–74)
- Military career
- Allegiance: Kingdom of Prussia
- Rank: Major general
- Conflicts: Seven Years' War

François Isaac Monod de Froideville (12 May 1720, Froideville, in the municipality of Ballens – 1794) was a Swiss military officer in Prussian service and lord of Froideville. The son of Gabriel Monod, châtelain of Bière, and Susanne de Crousaz de Prélaz, he was the brother of Benjamin Louis Monod de Froideville and Gabriel Monod de Froideville.

== Career ==
Monod de Froideville took part in the Seven Years' War in the Prussian army. He was promoted to colonel in 1775, served as quartermaster of the second army corps from 1779, and was made a member of the college of war and major general in 1788, before retiring shortly afterwards. He never married.
