= Gabriel Monod de Froideville =

Swiss military officer (1711–1758)

- Born: 11 March 1711; Froideville, Ballens
- Died: 9 September 1758 (aged 47); Frankfurt an der Oder
- Spouse: Christina Eusebia von Kalkreuth (m. 1748)
- Military career
- Allegiance: Dutch Republic (1727); Electorate of Saxony (1730); Kingdom of Prussia (1741)
- Rank: Major general
- Conflicts: Battle of Zorndorf (1758) †

Gabriel Monod de Froideville (11 March 1711, Froideville, in the municipality of Ballens – 9 September 1758, Frankfurt an der Oder) was a Swiss military officer in Prussian service.

The son of Gabriel Monod, châtelain of Bière, and Susanne de Crousaz de Prélaz, he was the brother of Benjamin Louis Monod de Froideville and François Isaac Monod de Froideville. He served as châtelain of Bière and as lord of Froideville, Urschkau (today Głogów, Poland), and Kanitz (today Kamieniec, Poland) in Silesia. In 1748 he married Christina Eusebia von Kalkreuth.

== Career ==
Monod de Froideville began his military career as a volunteer in Holland in 1727. In 1730 he transferred to the service of Saxony, and in 1741 to that of Prussia. As a major (1744), he drew up plans of the fortresses on the Elbe. He was promoted to colonel in 1755 and to major general in 1758, and was mortally wounded against the Russians at the Battle of Zorndorf in the same year.

== Bibliography ==
- H. J. Leu, Allgemeines helvetisches, eydgenössisches oder schweitzerisches Lexicon, suppl. 4, 1789, pp. 198–199.
