= Mollens, Vaud =

Mollens
- Municipality
- Flag Coat of arms
- Location of Mollens
- Location within Switzerland Location within Canton of Vaud
- Coordinates: 46°35′N 06°22′E
- Country: Switzerland
- Canton: Vaud
- District: Morges

Government
  - Mayor: Syndic

Area
  - Total: 11.00 km^{2} (4.25 sq mi)
- Elevation: 742 m (2,434 ft)

Population (2003)
  - Total: 275
  - Density: 25.0/km^{2} (64.7/sq mi)
- Time zone: UTC+01:00 (CET)
  - Summer (DST): UTC+02:00 (CEST)
- Postal code: 1146
- SFOS number: 5431
- ISO 3166 code: CH-VD
- Surrounded by: Apples, Ballens, Berolle, Montricher, Pampigny
- Website: www.mollensvd.ch

Mollens is a municipality in the Swiss canton of Vaud. It is located in the district of Morges.

== History ==
Mollens is first mentioned in 1111 as Enguizo de Morlens.

== Geography ==
Mollens has an area, as of 2009, of 11 square kilometers (4.2 sq mi). Of this area, 5.17 km^{2} (2.00 sq mi) or 47.0% is used for agricultural purposes, while 5.55 km^{2} (2.14 sq mi) or 50.5% is forested. Of the rest of the land, 0.25 km^{2} (0.097 sq mi) or 2.3% is settled (buildings or roads), 0.01 km^{2} (2.5 acres) or 0.1% is either rivers or lakes and 0.07 km^{2} (17 acres) or 0.6% is unproductive land.

Of the built up area, housing and buildings made up 0.8% and transportation infrastructure made up 0.9%. Out of the forested land, 48.8% of the total land area is heavily forested and 1.6% is covered with orchards or small clusters of trees. Of the agricultural land, 33.7% is used for growing crops and 9.7% is pastures and 3.3% is used for alpine pastures. All the water in the municipality is in lakes.

The municipality was part of the Aubonne District until it was dissolved on 31 August 2006, and Mollens became part of the new district of Morges.

The municipality is located at the foot of the Jura Mountains. It consists of the village of Mollens and a number of hamlets.

== Coat of arms ==
The blazon of the municipal coat of arms is Per fess, Argent and Or, overall a Lion rampant Gules holding a Club Or.

== Demographics ==
Mollens has a population (as of December 2020) of 330. As of 2008, 11.1% of the population are resident foreign nationals. Over the last 10 years (1999–2009 ) the population has changed at a rate of 2.9%. It has changed at a rate of -2.2% due to migration and at a rate of 6.3% due to births and deaths.

Most of the population (as of 2000) speaks French (255 or 93.8%), with German being second most common (11 or 4.0%) and Italian being third (3 or 1.1%).

Of the population in the municipality 102 or about 37.5% were born in Mollens and lived there in 2000. There were 87 or 32.0% who were born in the same canton, while 55 or 20.2% were born somewhere else in Switzerland, and 27 or 9.9% were born outside of Switzerland.

In 2008 there were 4 live births to Swiss citizens and were 2 deaths of Swiss citizens. Ignoring immigration and emigration, the population of Swiss citizens increased by 2 while the foreign population remained the same. There was 1 Swiss woman who immigrated back to Switzerland. At the same time, there was 1 non-Swiss man who emigrated from Switzerland to another country and 4 non-Swiss women who immigrated from another country to Switzerland. The total Swiss population change in 2008 (from all sources, including moves across municipal borders) was a decrease of 7 and the non-Swiss population increased by 6 people. This represents a population growth rate of -0.3%.

The age distribution, as of 2009, in Mollens is; 44 children or 15.7% of the population are between 0 and 9 years old and 41 teenagers or 14.6% are between 10 and 19. Of the adult population, 30 people or 10.7% of the population are between 20 and 29 years old. 44 people or 15.7% are between 30 and 39, 35 people or 12.5% are between 40 and 49, and 24 people or 8.6% are between 50 and 59. The senior population distribution is 31 people or 11.1% of the population are between 60 and 69 years old, 23 people or 8.2% are between 70 and 79, there are 8 people or 2.9% who are between 80 and 89.

As of 2000, there were 110 people who were single and never married in the municipality. There were 131 married individuals, 21 widows or widowers and 10 individuals who are divorced.

As of 2000, there were 109 private households in the municipality, and an average of 2.5 persons per household. There were 32 households that consist of only one person and 11 households with five or more people. Out of a total of 111 households that answered this question, 28.8% were households made up of just one person and there were 2 adults who lived with their parents. Of the rest of the households, there are 31 married couples without children, 36 married couples with children There were 6 single parents with a child or children. There were 2 households that were made up of unrelated people and 2 households that were made up of some sort of institution or another collective housing.

In 2000 there were 48 single family homes (or 51.6% of the total) out of a total of 93 inhabited buildings. There were 7 multi-family buildings (7.5%), along with 34 multi-purpose buildings that were mostly used for housing (36.6%) and 4 other use buildings (commercial or industrial) that also had some housing (4.3%). Of the single family homes 37 were built before 1919, while 4 were built between 1990 and 2000. The most multi-family homes (3) were built before 1919 and the next most (1) were built between 1919 and 1945.

In 2000 there were 118 apartments in the municipality. The most common apartment size was 4 rooms of which there were 37. There were 5 single room apartments and 40 apartments with five or more rooms. Of these apartments, a total of 105 apartments (89.0% of the total) were permanently occupied, while 7 apartments (5.9%) were seasonally occupied and 6 apartments (5.1%) were empty. As of 2009, the construction rate of new housing units was 0 new units per 1000 residents. The vacancy rate for the municipality, in 2010, was 0.81%.

The historical population is given in the following chart:

== Sights ==
The entire village of Mollens is designated as part of the Inventory of Swiss Heritage Sites.

== Politics ==
In the 2007 federal election the most popular party was the LPS Party which received 26.32% of the vote. The next three most popular parties were the SVP (23.99%), the SP (15.68%) and the FDP (11.96%). In the federal election, a total of 77 votes were cast, and the voter turnout was 40.1%.

== Economy ==
As of 2010, Mollens had an unemployment rate of 4.3%. As of 2008, there were 41 people employed in the primary economic sector and about 18 businesses involved in this sector. 14 people were employed in the secondary sector and there were 3 businesses in this sector. 11 people were employed in the tertiary sector, with 4 businesses in this sector. There were 146 residents of the municipality who were employed in some capacity, of which females made up 40.4% of the workforce.

In 2008 the total number of full-time equivalent jobs was 48. The number of jobs in the primary sector was 27, of which 26 were in agriculture and 1 was in forestry or lumber production. The number of jobs in the secondary sector was 12, all of which were in manufacturing. The number of jobs in the tertiary sector was 9. In the tertiary sector; 1 was in the sale or repair of motor vehicles, 4 or 44.4% were in a hotel or restaurant, 1 was in the information industry, 3 or 33.3% were in education.

In 2000, there were 4 workers who commuted into the municipality and 98 workers who commuted away. The municipality is a net exporter of workers, with about 24.5 workers leaving the municipality for every one entering. Of the working population, 6.8% used public transportation to get to work, and 65.1% used a private car.

== Religion ==
From the 2000 census, 42 or 15.4% were Roman Catholic, while 187 or 68.8% belonged to the Swiss Reformed Church. Of the rest of the population, and there were 2 individuals (or about 0.74% of the population) who belonged to another Christian church. There was 1 person who was Buddhist. 31 (or about 11.40% of the population) belonged to no church, are agnostic or atheist, and 9 individuals (or about 3.31% of the population) did not answer the question.

== Education ==
In Mollens about 100 or (36.8%) of the population have completed non-mandatory upper secondary education, and 32 or (11.8%) have completed additional higher education (either university or a Fachhochschule). Of the 32 who completed tertiary schooling, 59.4% were Swiss men, 25.0% were Swiss women.

In the 2009/2010 school year there were a total of 49 students in the Mollens (VD) school district. In the Vaud cantonal school system, two years of non-obligatory pre-school are provided by the political districts. During the school year, the political district provided pre-school care for a total of 631 children of which 203 children (32.2%) received subsidized pre-school care. The canton's primary school program requires students to attend for four years. There were 25 students in the municipal primary school program. The obligatory lower secondary school program lasts for six years and there were 24 students in those schools.

As of 2000, there were 13 students in Mollens who came from another municipality, while 34 residents attended schools outside the municipality.
