= Montherod =

- Former municipality
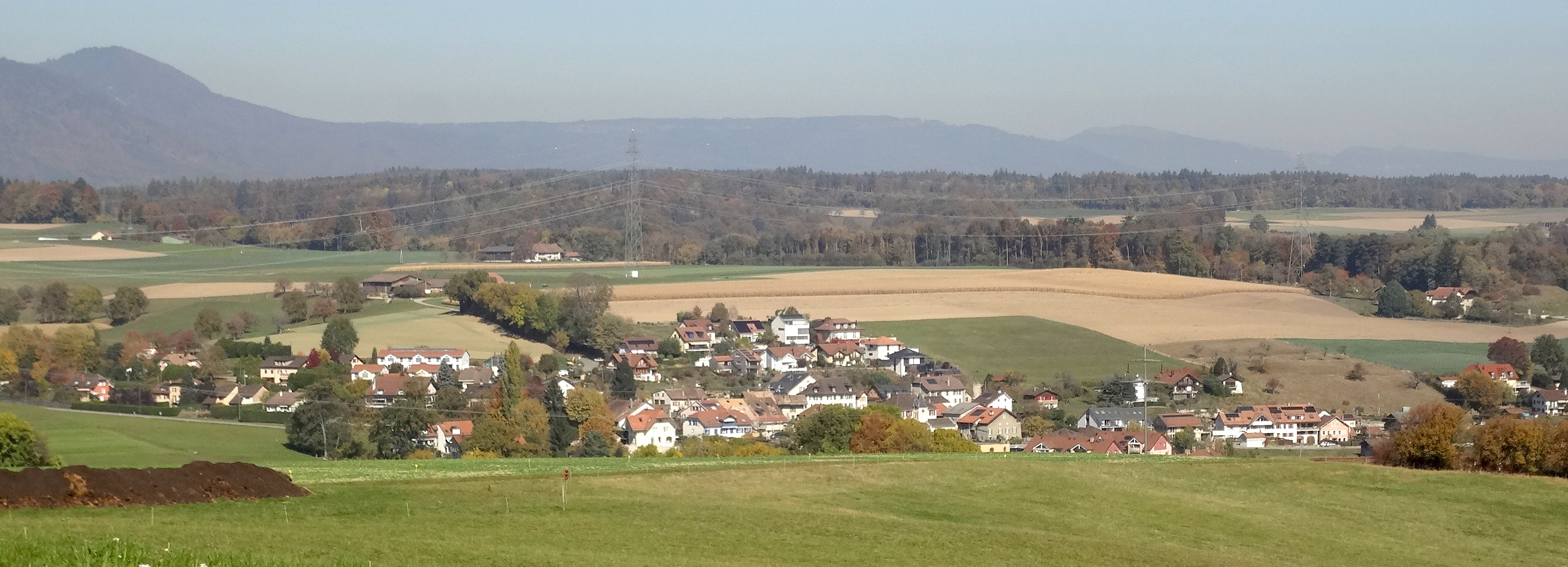

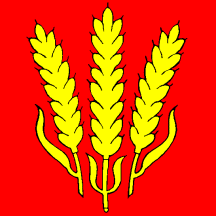
- Flag Coat of arms
- Location of Montherod
- Location within Switzerland Location within Canton of Vaud
- Coordinates: 46°30′N 06°22′E
- Country: Switzerland
- Canton: Vaud
- District: Morges

Government
  - Mayor: Syndic; Philippe Chevallaz

Area
  - Total: 4.97 km^{2} (1.92 sq mi)
- Elevation: 592 m (1,942 ft)

Population (2019)
  - Total: 536
  - Density: 108/km^{2} (279/sq mi)
- Demonym: Les Montherolis
- Time zone: UTC+01:00 (CET)
  - Summer (DST): UTC+02:00 (CEST)
- Postal code: 1174
- SFOS number: 5432
- ISO 3166 code: CH-VD
- Surrounded by: Bière, Saint-Livres, Aubonne, Pizy, Gimel, Saubraz
- Website: www.montherod.ch

Montherod is a former municipality in the Swiss canton of Vaud. It is located in the district of Morges. On 1 January 2021 the former municipality of Montherod merged into the municipality of Aubonne.

== History ==
Montherod was first mentioned in about 1344 as Monterot.

== Geography ==
Montherod had an area, as of 2009, of 4.97 square kilometers (1.92 sq mi). Of this area, 2.31 km^{2} (0.89 sq mi) or 46.5% is used for agricultural purposes, while 2.26 km^{2} (0.87 sq mi) or 45.5% is forested. Of the rest of the land, 0.36 km^{2} (0.14 sq mi) or 7.2% is settled (buildings or roads), 0.02 km^{2} (4.9 acres) or 0.4% is either rivers or lakes.

Of the built up area, housing and buildings made up 2.8% and transportation infrastructure made up 2.6%, while parks, green belts and sports fields made up 1.6%. All forested land is covered with heavy forest. Of the agricultural land, 38.6% is used for growing crops and 6.2% is pastures, while 1.6% is used for orchards or vine crops. Of the water in the municipality, 0.2% is in lakes and 0.2% is in rivers and streams.

The former municipality was part of the Aubonne District until it was dissolved on 31 August 2006, and Montherod became part of the new district of Morges.

The former municipality is located on the right bank of the Aubonne river along the road to Col du Marchairuz. It consists of the village of Montherod and several scattered farm houses.

== Coat of arms ==
The blazon of the municipal coat of arms is Gules, three Corn Ears Or.

== Demographics ==
Montherod had a population (as of 2019) of 536. As of 2008, 22.1% of the population are resident foreign nationals. Over the last 10 years (1999–2009 ) the population has changed at a rate of 21.3%. It has changed at a rate of 17.1% due to migration and at a rate of 5.6% due to births and deaths.

Most of the population (as of 2000) speaks French (382 or 87.0%), with German being second most common (20 or 4.6%) and English being third (13 or 3.0%). There are 7 people who speak Italian.

Of the population in the municipality 95 or about 21.6% were born in Montherod and lived there in 2000. There were 154 or 35.1% who were born in the same canton, while 96 or 21.9% were born somewhere else in Switzerland, and 93 or 21.2% were born outside of Switzerland.

In 2008 there were 6 live births to Swiss citizens and were 3 deaths of Swiss citizens. Ignoring immigration and emigration, the population of Swiss citizens increased by 3 while the foreign population remained the same. There were 9 non-Swiss men and 11 non-Swiss women who immigrated from another country to Switzerland. The total Swiss population change in 2008 (from all sources, including moves across municipal borders) was an increase of 12 and the non-Swiss population increased by 10 people. This represents a population growth rate of 4.4%.

The age distribution, as of 2009, in Montherod is; 63 children or 12.1% of the population are between 0 and 9 years old and 70 teenagers or 13.5% are between 10 and 19. Of the adult population, 62 people or 11.9% of the population are between 20 and 29 years old. 86 people or 16.6% are between 30 and 39, 98 people or 18.9% are between 40 and 49, and 67 people or 12.9% are between 50 and 59. The senior population distribution is 40 people or 7.7% of the population are between 60 and 69 years old, 20 people or 3.9% are between 70 and 79, there are 12 people or 2.3% who are between 80 and 89, and there is 1 person who is 90 and older.

As of 2000, there were 197 people who were single and never married in the municipality. There were 207 married individuals, 12 widows or widowers and 23 individuals who are divorced.

As of 2000, there were 160 private households in the municipality, and an average of 2.6 persons per household. There were 41 households that consist of only one person and 10 households with five or more people. Out of a total of 164 households that answered this question, 25.0% were households made up of just one person. Of the rest of the households, there are 41 married couples without children, 67 married couples with children There were 7 single parents with a child or children. There were 4 households that were made up of unrelated people and 4 households that were made up of some sort of institution or another collective housing.

In 2000 there were 49 single-family homes (or 52.1% of the total) out of a total of 94 inhabited buildings. There were 20 multi-family buildings (21.3%), along with 17 multi-purpose buildings that were mostly used for housing (18.1%) and 8 other use buildings (commercial or industrial) that also had some housing (8.5%). Of the single-family homes 10 were built before 1919, while 8 were built between 1990 and 2000. The greatest number of single-family homes (15) were built between 1981 and 1990. The greatest number of multi-family homes (6) were built before 1919 and again between 1971 and 1980

In 2000 there were 173 apartments in the municipality. The most common apartment size was 4 rooms of which there were 47. There were 10 single-room apartments and 49 apartments with five or more rooms. Of these apartments, a total of 154 apartments (89.0% of the total) were permanently occupied, while 14 apartments (8.1%) were seasonally occupied and 5 apartments (2.9%) were empty. As of 2009, the construction rate of new housing units was 0 new units per 1000 residents. The vacancy rate for the municipality, in 2010, was 0%.

The historical population is given in the following chart:

== Politics ==
In the 2007 federal election the most popular party was the SVP which received 25.48% of the vote. The next three most popular parties were the SP (17.62%), the Green Party (16.86%) and the FDP (12.33%). In the federal election, a total of 108 votes were cast, and the voter turnout was 39.0%.

== Economy ==
As of 2010, Montherod had an unemployment rate of 3.4%. As of 2008, there were 22 people employed in the primary economic sector and about 10 businesses involved in this sector. 35 people were employed in the secondary sector and there were 4 businesses in this sector. 48 people were employed in the tertiary sector, with 9 businesses in this sector. There were 223 residents of the municipality who were employed in some capacity, of which females made up 46.2% of the workforce.

In 2008 the total number of full-time equivalent jobs was 90. The number of jobs in the primary sector was 17, all of which were in agriculture. The number of jobs in the secondary sector was 34 of which 2 or (5.9%) were in manufacturing and 26 (76.5%) were in construction. The number of jobs in the tertiary sector was 39. In the tertiary sector; 3 or 7.7% were in wholesale or retail sales or the repair of motor vehicles, 2 or 5.1% were in a hotel or restaurant, 2 or 5.1% were technical professionals or scientists, 2 or 5.1% were in education and 24 or 61.5% were in health care.

In 2000, there were 24 workers who commuted into the municipality and 173 workers who commuted away. The municipality is a net exporter of workers, with about 7.2 workers leaving the municipality for every one entering. Of the working population, 5.4% used public transportation to get to work, and 74% used a private car.

== Religion ==
From the 2000 census, 123 or 28.0% were Roman Catholic, while 234 or 53.3% belonged to the Swiss Reformed Church. Of the rest of the population, there was 1 member of an Orthodox church, and there were 9 individuals (or about 2.05% of the population) who belonged to another Christian church. There were 4 individuals (or about 0.91% of the population) who were Jewish, and 65 (or about 14.81% of the population) belonged to no church, are agnostic or atheist, and 3 individuals (or about 0.68% of the population) did not answer the question.

== Education ==
In Montherod about 156 or (35.5%) of the population have completed non-mandatory upper secondary education, and 68 or (15.5%) have completed additional higher education (either university or a Fachhochschule). Of the 68 who completed tertiary schooling, 42.6% were Swiss men, 33.8% were Swiss women, 19.1% were non-Swiss men.

In the 2009/2010 school year there were a total of 67 students in the Montherod school district. In the Vaud cantonal school system, two years of non-obligatory pre-school are provided by the political districts. During the school year, the political district provided pre-school care for a total of 631 children of which 203 children (32.2%) received subsidized pre-school care. The canton's primary school program requires students to attend for four years. There were 34 students in the municipal primary school program. The obligatory lower secondary school program lasts for six years and there were 33 students in those schools.
