= Montricher =

- Municipality
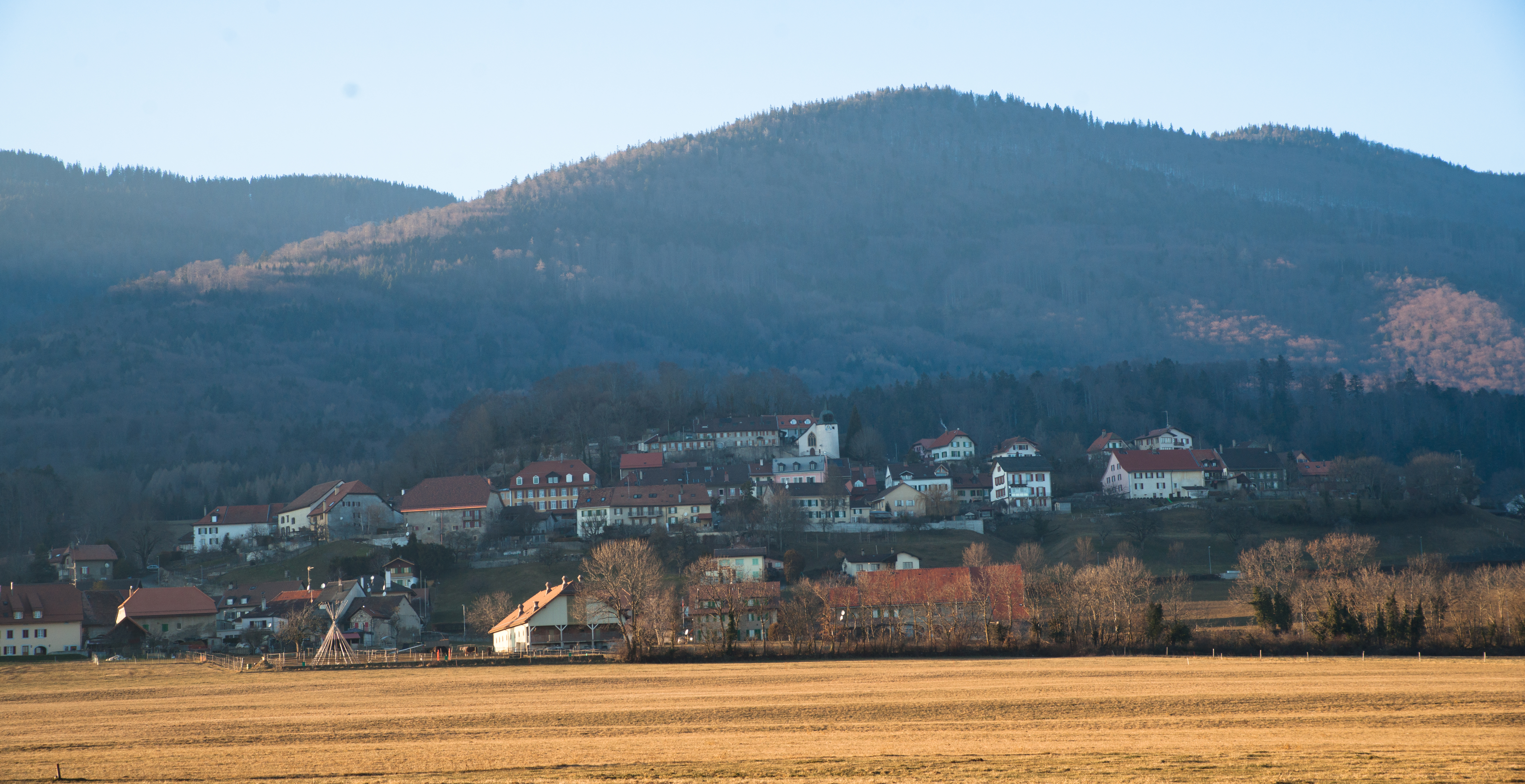
- Montricher village

- Flag Coat of arms
- Location of Montricher
- Location within Switzerland Location within Canton of Vaud
- Coordinates: 46°36′N 06°22′E
- Country: Switzerland
- Canton: Vaud
- District: Morges

Government
  - Mayor: Syndic; Michel Desmeules

Area
  - Total: 25.98 km^{2} (10.03 sq mi)
- Elevation: 752 m (2,467 ft)

Population (2004)
  - Total: 739
  - Density: 28.4/km^{2} (73.7/sq mi)
- Demonym: Les Montélets
- Time zone: UTC+01:00 (CET)
  - Summer (DST): UTC+02:00 (CEST)
- Postal code: 1147
- SFOS number: 5492
- ISO 3166 code: CH-VD
- Surrounded by: L'Isle, Mauraz, Pampigny, Berolle, Mollens (VD), Le Chenit, L'Abbaye
- Website: www.montricher.ch

Montricher is a municipality of the canton of Vaud in Switzerland, located in the district of Morges.

== History ==
Montricher is first mentioned in 1049 as Mons Richarius. In 1301 it was mentioned as Montricher.

== Geography ==
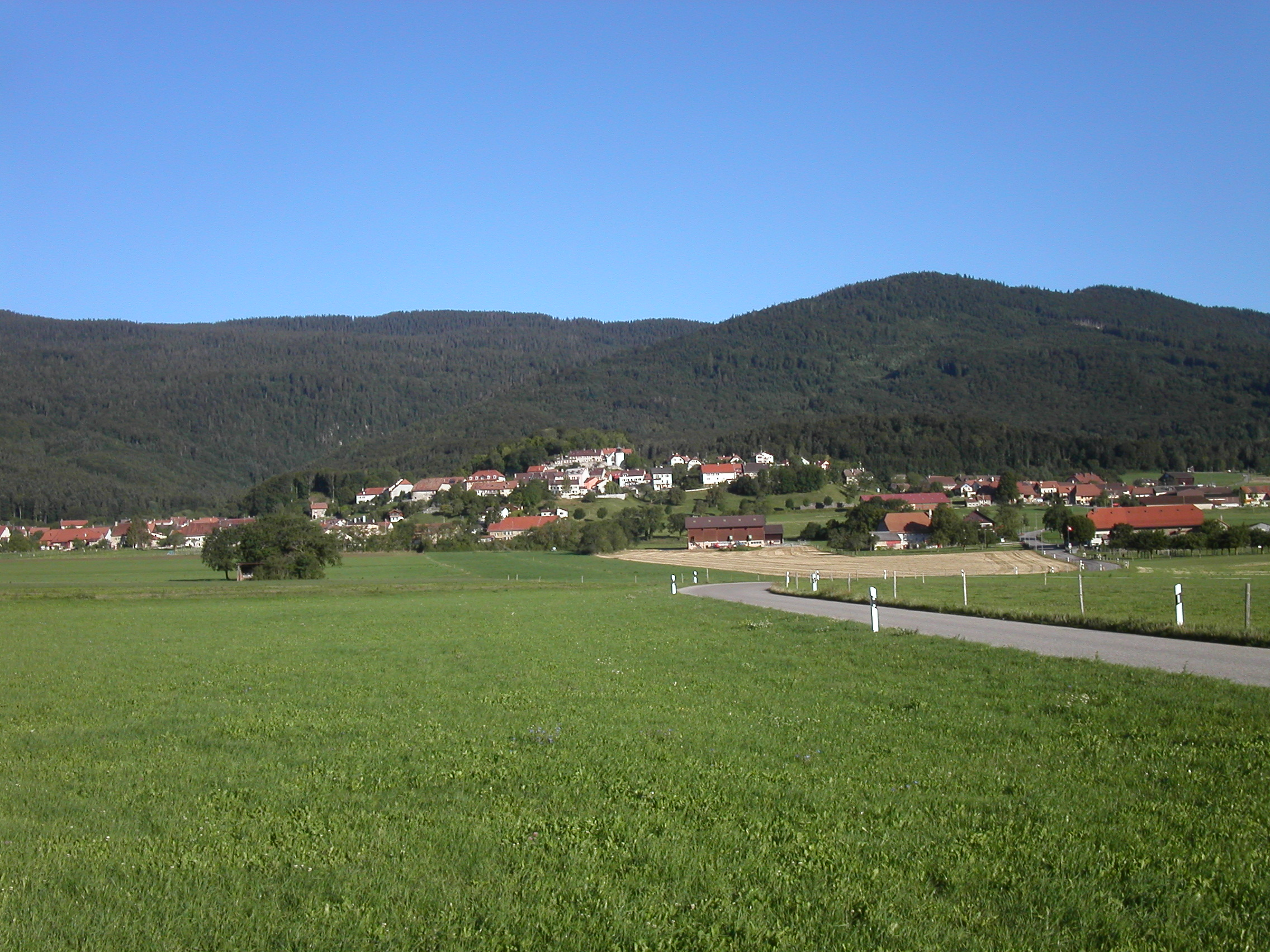
Montricher

Aerial view (1949)

Montricher has an area, as of 2009, of 25.98 square kilometers (10.03 sq mi). Of this area, 10.04 km^{2} (3.88 sq mi) or 38.6% is used for agricultural purposes, while 14.91 km^{2} (5.76 sq mi) or 57.4% is forested. Of the rest of the land, 0.79 km^{2} (0.31 sq mi) or 3.0% is settled (buildings or roads), 0.02 km^{2} (4.9 acres) or 0.1% is either rivers or lakes and 0.19 km^{2} (0.073 sq mi) or 0.7% is unproductive land.

Of the built up area, housing and buildings made up 1.0% and transportation infrastructure made up 1.5%. Out of the forested land, 53.9% of the total land area is heavily forested and 3.5% is covered with orchards or small clusters of trees. Of the agricultural land, 17.3% is used for growing crops and 9.4% is pastures and 11.6% is used for alpine pastures. All the water in the municipality is flowing water.

The municipality was part of the Cossonay District until it was dissolved on 31 August 2006, and Montricher became part of the new district of Morges.

The municipality is located in the forested foothills of the Jura Mountains. The municipality includes the peak of Mont Tendre, which is the highest peak in the Swiss Jura Mountains. It has an elevation of 1,679 m (5,509 ft).

== Coat of arms ==
The blazon of the municipal coat of arms is Argent, in Chief Gules three Escallops Or.

== Demographics ==
Montricher has a population (as of December 2020) of 964. As of 2008, 8.0% of the population are resident foreign nationals. Over the last 10 years (1999–2009 ) the population has changed at a rate of 14.9%. It has changed at a rate of 11.4% due to migration and at a rate of 3% due to births and deaths.

Most of the population (as of 2000) speaks French (642 or 92.2%), with German being second most common (25 or 3.6%) and English being third (11 or 1.6%). There are 6 people who speak Italian.

Of the population in the municipality 247 or about 35.5% were born in Montricher and lived there in 2000. There were 266 or 38.2% who were born in the same canton, while 96 or 13.8% were born somewhere else in Switzerland, and 87 or 12.5% were born outside of Switzerland.

In 2008 there were 5 live births to Swiss citizens and were 5 deaths of Swiss citizens and 1 non-Swiss citizen death. Ignoring immigration and emigration, the population of Swiss citizens remained the same while the foreign population decreased by 1. At the same time, there were 3 non-Swiss men and 7 non-Swiss women who immigrated from another country to Switzerland. The total Swiss population change in 2008 (from all sources, including moves across municipal borders) was an increase of 3 and the non-Swiss population increased by 8 people. This represents a population growth rate of 1.4%.

The age distribution, as of 2009, in Montricher is; 95 children or 11.8% of the population are between 0 and 9 years old and 125 teenagers or 15.5% are between 10 and 19. Of the adult population, 59 people or 7.3% of the population are between 20 and 29 years old. 114 people or 14.1% are between 30 and 39, 143 people or 17.7% are between 40 and 49, and 99 people or 12.3% are between 50 and 59. The senior population distribution is 97 people or 12.0% of the population are between 60 and 69 years old, 43 people or 5.3% are between 70 and 79, there are 31 people or 3.8% who are between 80 and 89, and there are 2 people or 0.2% who are 90 and older.

As of 2000, there were 292 people who were single and never married in the municipality. There were 341 married individuals, 28 widows or widowers and 35 individuals who are divorced.

As of 2000, there were 290 private households in the municipality, and an average of 2.3 persons per household. There were 98 households that consist of only one person and 20 households with five or more people. Out of a total of 295 households that answered this question, 33.2% were households made up of just one person. Of the rest of the households, there are 87 married couples without children, 90 married couples with children There were 13 single parents with a child or children. There were 2 households that were made up of unrelated people and 5 households that were made up of some sort of institution or another collective housing.

In 2000 there were 108 single family homes (or 50.5% of the total) out of a total of 214 inhabited buildings. There were 49 multi-family buildings (22.9%), along with 46 multi-purpose buildings that were mostly used for housing (21.5%) and 11 other use buildings (commercial or industrial) that also had some housing (5.1%). Of the single family homes 46 were built before 1919, while 8 were built between 1990 and 2000. The most multi-family homes (28) were built before 1919 and the next most (6) were built between 1971 and 1980.

In 2000 there were 333 apartments in the municipality. The most common apartment size was 4 rooms of which there were 103. There were 11 single room apartments and 101 apartments with five or more rooms. Of these apartments, a total of 286 apartments (85.9% of the total) were permanently occupied, while 31 apartments (9.3%) were seasonally occupied and 16 apartments (4.8%) were empty. As of 2009, the construction rate of new housing units was 0 new units per 1000 residents. The vacancy rate for the municipality, in 2010, was 2.86%.

The historical population is given in the following chart:

== Politics ==
In the 2007 federal election the most popular party was the SVP which received 23.11% of the vote. The next three most popular parties were the SP (22.04%), the FDP (19.83%) and the Green Party (16.64%). In the federal election, a total of 280 votes were cast, and the voter turnout was 52.8%.

== Economy ==
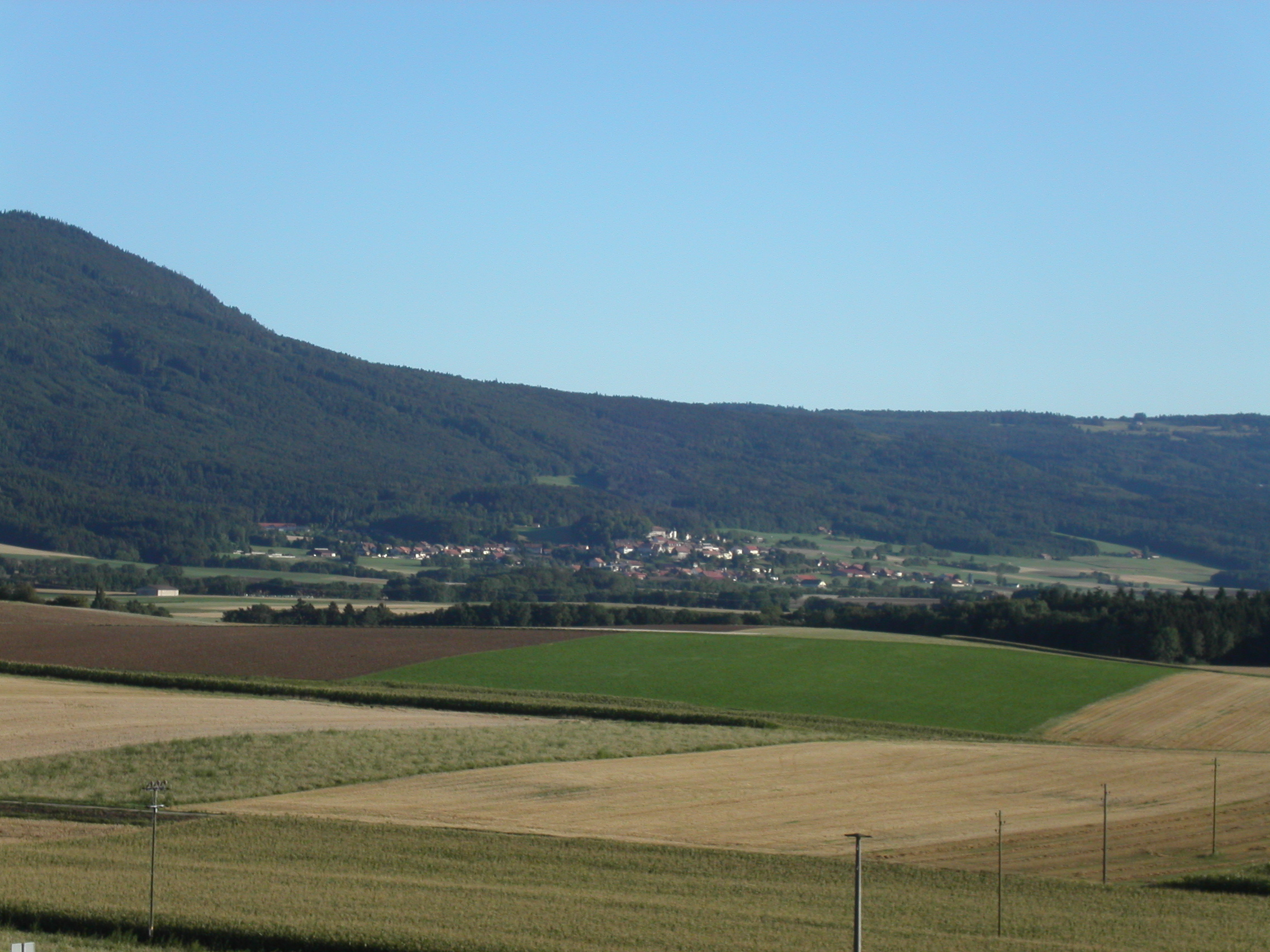
Fields outside Montricher

As of 2010, Montricher had an unemployment rate of 3.8%. As of 2008, there were 61 people employed in the primary economic sector and about 26 businesses involved in this sector. 14 people were employed in the secondary sector and there were 9 businesses in this sector. 122 people were employed in the tertiary sector, with 27 businesses in this sector. There were 386 residents of the municipality who were employed in some capacity, of which females made up 42.5% of the workforce.

In 2008 the total number of full-time equivalent jobs was 157. The number of jobs in the primary sector was 47, of which 35 were in agriculture and 12 were in forestry or lumber production. The number of jobs in the secondary sector was 13 of which 4 or (30.8%) were in manufacturing and 9 (69.2%) were in construction. The number of jobs in the tertiary sector was 97. In the tertiary sector; 35 or 36.1% were in wholesale or retail sales or the repair of motor vehicles, 2 or 2.1% were in the movement and storage of goods, 10 or 10.3% were in a hotel or restaurant, 11 or 11.3% were the insurance or financial industry, 26 or 26.8% were technical professionals or scientists, 8 or 8.2% were in education.

In 2000, there were 44 workers who commuted into the municipality and 245 workers who commuted away. The municipality is a net exporter of workers, with about 5.6 workers leaving the municipality for every one entering. Of the working population, 7% used public transportation to get to work, and 61.7% used a private car.

The municipality is served by a station on the Bière–Apples–Morges railway.

== Religion ==
From the 2000 census, 99 or 14.2% were Roman Catholic, while 430 or 61.8% belonged to the Swiss Reformed Church. Of the rest of the population, there were 36 individuals (or about 5.17% of the population) who belonged to another Christian church. There were 2 individuals (or about 0.29% of the population) who were Jewish, and 3 (or about 0.43% of the population) who were Islamic. 133 (or about 19.11% of the population) belonged to no church, are agnostic or atheist, and 7 individuals (or about 1.01% of the population) did not answer the question.

== Education ==
In Montricher about 301 or (43.2%) of the population have completed non-mandatory upper secondary education, and 81 or (11.6%) have completed additional higher education (either university or a Fachhochschule). Of the 81 who completed tertiary schooling, 53.1% were Swiss men, 38.3% were Swiss women and 6.2% were non-Swiss women.

In the 2009/2010 school year there were a total of 122 students in the Montricher school district. In the Vaud cantonal school system, two years of non-obligatory pre-school are provided by the political districts. During the school year, the political district provided pre-school care for a total of 631 children of which 203 children (32.2%) received subsidized pre-school care. The canton's primary school program requires students to attend for four years. There were 59 students in the municipal primary school program. The obligatory lower secondary school program lasts for six years and there were 63 students in those schools.

As of 2000, there were 26 students in Montricher who came from another municipality, while 78 residents attended schools outside the municipality.
