= Saubraz =

- Municipality
- Flag Coat of arms
- Location of Saubraz
- Location within Switzerland Location within Canton of Vaud
- Coordinates: 46°31′N 06°20′E
- Country: Switzerland
- Canton: Vaud
- District: Morges

Government
  - Mayor: Syndic; Bernard Arnoldi

Area
  - Total: 3.7 km^{2} (1.4 sq mi)
- Elevation: 687 m (2,254 ft)

Population (2003)
  - Total: 218
  - Density: 59/km^{2} (150/sq mi)
- Demonym: Les Saubrians
- Time zone: UTC+01:00 (CET)
  - Summer (DST): UTC+02:00 (CEST)
- Postal code: 1189
- SFOS number: 5437
- ISO 3166 code: CH-VD
- Surrounded by: Bière, Gimel, Montherod
- Website: www.saubraz.ch

Saubraz is a municipality in Switzerland. It is located in the district of Morges, in the canton of Vaud.

== History ==
Saubraz is first mentioned in the 13th century as de Salubra. In 1251, it was mentioned as Saubra. The town formed around a church, which belonged to the Premonstratensian Abbey of Lac-de-Joux (L’Abbaye) and burned down in 1251. After Bern conquered Vaud in 1536, Saubraz shared in the fate of Aubonne, and in 1701 it became a part of the Aubonne administrative district. After the breakup of the Ancien régime, the town was a part of the canton Léman from 1798 to 1803 during the Helvetic Republic. It subsequently was absorbed by the canton of Vaud and in 1798 assigned to the district of Aubonne.

The chapel, which had been built on the ruins of the medieval church, was cleared away during the building of a schoolhouse in 1899. Today, Saubraz is part of the Gimel parish.

== Geography ==
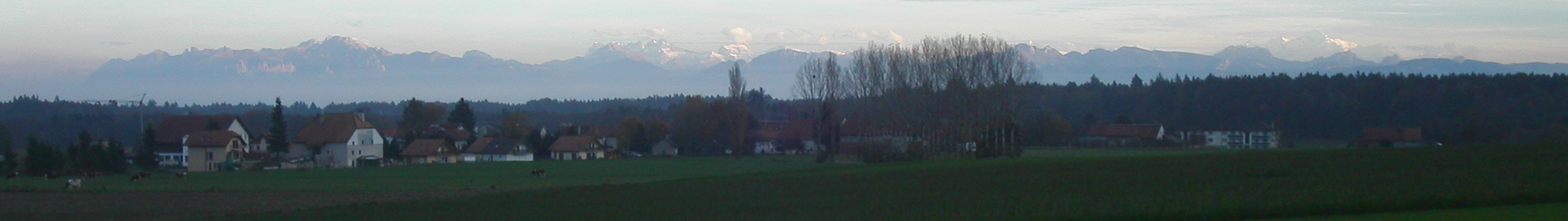
Saubraz

Saubraz has an area, as of 2009, of 3.7 square kilometers (1.4 sq mi). Of this area, 1.71 km^{2} (0.66 sq mi) or 46.2% is used for agricultural purposes, while 1.69 km^{2} (0.65 sq mi) or 45.7% is forested. Of the rest of the land, 0.26 km^{2} (0.10 sq mi) or 7.0% is settled (buildings or roads), 0.01 km^{2} (2.5 acres) or 0.3% is either rivers or lakes and 0.03 km^{2} (7.4 acres) or 0.8% is unproductive land.

Of the built-up area, housing and buildings made up 1.6%, and transportation infrastructure made up 2.2%. Power and water infrastructure as well as other specially developed areas made up 2.7% of the area. Out of the forested land, 43.8% of the total land area is heavily forested and 1.9% is covered with orchards or small clusters of trees. Of the agricultural land, 32.4% is used for growing crops and 13.0% is for pastures. All the water in the municipality is flowing water.

The municipality was part of the Aubonne District until it was dissolved on 31 August 2006, and Saubraz became part of the new district of Morges.

The municipality is located at the foot of the Jura Mountains near the Col du Marchairuz road.

Saubraz is located at an elevation of 687 m (2,254 ft) above mean sea level (AMSL), 13 km west of the city of Morges. It is a farming village sprawled across a plateau in the Jura Mountains between the valleys of Saubrett in the south and Toleure in the north.

The creek Saubrett and its tributary Toluere drain the eastern part of the area into the Aubonne river. Toleure forms the northern boundary of the municipality. The plateau of Saubraz is located between the two creeks; it gradually rises to the Jura Mountains in the northwest. The highest point in Saubraz is located at 810 m (2,660 ft) AMSL at the foot of Mont Chaubert. In the south, the municipality's woodland area Bois des Ursins rises to the Ursins Plateau.

The municipalities of Gimel, Montherod and Bière border Saubraz.

== Coat of arms ==
The blazon of the municipal coat of arms is Per pale Gules and Or, overall a Crane Argent, in Canton a Mullet of Five of the second.

== Demographics ==
Saubraz has a population (as of December 2020) of 423. As of 2008, 17.4% of the population are resident foreign nationals. Over the last 10 years (1999-2009), the population has changed at a rate of 77.7%. It has changed at a rate of 72.1% due to migration and at a rate of 5.1% due to births and deaths.

Most of the population (as of 2000) speaks French (179 or 90.4%), with German being the second most common (9 or 4.5%) and Portuguese being third (7 or 3.5%). There is 1 person who speaks Italian.

Of the population in the municipality, 61 or about 30.8% were born in Saubraz and lived there in 2000. There were 61 or 30.8% who were born in the same canton, while 31 or 15.7% were born somewhere else in Switzerland, and 42 or 21.2% were born outside of Switzerland.

In 2008, there were 3 live births and 5 deaths among Swiss citizens. Ignoring immigration and emigration, the population of Swiss citizens decreased by 2%, while the foreign population remained the same. There were 2 non-Swiss men and 1 non-Swiss woman who immigrated from another country to Switzerland. The total Swiss population change in 2008 (from all sources, including moves across municipal borders) was an increase of 9 and the non-Swiss population increased by 10 people. This represents a population growth rate of 6.3%.

The age distribution, as of 2009, in Saubraz is; 62 children or 17.9% of the population are between 0 and 9 years old and 48 teenagers or 13.9% are between 10 and 19. Of the adult population, 26 people or 7.5% of the population are between 20 and 29 years old. 67 people or 19.4% are between 30 and 39, 55 people or 15.9% are between 40 and 49, and 34 people or 9.8% are between 50 and 59. The senior population distribution is 26 people or 7.5% of the population are between 60 and 69 years old, 14 people or 4.0% are between 70 and 79, there are 10 people or 2.9% who are between 80 and 89, and there are 4 people or 1.2% who are 90 and older.

As of 2000, 72 people were single and never married in the municipality. There were 99 married individuals, 15 widows or widowers and 12 individuals who were divorced.

As of 2000, there were 88 private households in the municipality, and an average of 2.2 persons per household. 28 households consist of only one person, and 2 households with five or more people. Out of a total of 90 households that answered this question, 31.1% were households made up of just one person, and 2 adults living with their parents. Of the rest of the households, there are 26 married couples without children, 27 married couples with children. There were 3 single parents with a child or children. There were 2 households that were made up of unrelated people and 2 households that were made up of some sort of institution or another collective housing.

In 2000, there were 27 single-family homes (or 45.0% of the total) out of a total of 60 inhabited buildings. There were 12 multi-family buildings (20.0%), along with 16 multi-purpose buildings that were mostly used for housing (26.7%) and 5 other use buildings (commercial or industrial) that also had some housing (8.3%). Of the single-family homes, 18 were built before 1919, while 2 were built between 1990 and 2000. The most multi-family homes (9) were built before 1919, and the next most (1) were built between 1961 and 1970.

In 2000 there were 105 apartments in the municipality. The most common apartment size was 3 rooms, of which there were 30. There were 4 single-room apartments and 31 apartments with five or more rooms. Of these apartments, a total of 87 apartments (82.9% of the total) were permanently occupied, while 13 apartments (12.4%) were seasonally occupied and 5 apartments (4.8%) were empty. As of 2009, the construction rate of new housing units was 25.7 new units per 1000 residents. The vacancy rate for the municipality, in 2010, was 0%.

The historical population is given in the following chart:

== Politics ==
In the 2007 federal election, the most popular party was the SVP, which received 48.52% of the vote. The next three most popular parties were the SP (13.95%), the FDP (8.85%) and the Green Party (8.55%). In the federal election, a total of 96 votes were cast, and the voter turnout was 54.5%.

== Economy ==
Up until the second half of the 20th century, Saubraz was predominantly an agricultural town. Even today, agriculture plays an important role, as animal husbandry, dairy production and farming are the dominant occupations. Other jobs are found in local businesses and the services sector. Because the town has developed into a more residential area in the last few decades, many commuters who work in the neighbouring towns of Gimla and Biere, as well as in the larger cities along Lake Geneva, have left.

As of 2010, Saubraz had an unemployment rate of 3.5%. As of 2008, there were 9 people employed in the primary economic sector and about 5 businesses involved in this sector. 6 people were employed in the secondary sector, and there were 4 businesses in this sector. 8 people were employed in the tertiary sector, with 5 businesses in this sector. 109 residents of the municipality were employed in some capacity, of which females made up 43.1% of the workforce.

In 2008 the total number of full-time equivalent jobs was 19. The number of jobs in the primary sector was 6, all of which were in agriculture. The number of jobs in the secondary sector was 6 of which 4 (66.7%) were in manufacturing and 2 (33.3%) were in construction. The number of jobs in the tertiary sector was 7. In the tertiary sector; 3 or 42.9% were in wholesale or retail sales or the repair of motor vehicles, 1 was a technical professional or scientist, and 2 or 28.6% were in education.

In 2000, 4 workers commuted into the municipality and 80 workers who commuted away. The municipality is a net exporter of workers, with about 20.0 workers leaving the municipality for every one entering. Of the working population, 7.3% used public transportation to get to work, and 65.1% used a private car.

== Religion ==
From the 2000 census, 35 or 17.7% were Roman Catholic, while 119 or 60.1% belonged to the Swiss Reformed Church. There was 1 individual who belonged to another Christian church. There were 3 (or about 1.52% of the population) who were Islamic. 32 (or about 16.16% of the population) belonged to no church, were agnostic or atheist, and 8 individuals (or about 4.04% of the population) did not answer the question.

== Education ==
In Saubraz, about 81 or 40.9% of the population have completed non-mandatory upper secondary education, and 22 or (11.1%) have completed additional higher education (either university or a Fachhochschule). Of the 22 who completed tertiary schooling, 59.1% were Swiss men, and 22.7% were Swiss women.

In the 2009/2010 school year, there were a total of 66 students in the Saubraz school district. In the Vaud cantonal school system, two years of non-obligatory pre-school are provided by the political districts. During the school year, the political district provided pre-school care for a total of 631 children, of which 203 children (32.2%) received subsidized pre-school care. The canton's primary school program requires students to attend for four years. There were 42 students in the municipal primary school program. The obligatory lower secondary school program lasts for six years, and there were 24 students in those schools.

As of 2000, 15 students in Saubraz came from another municipality, while 21 residents attended schools outside the municipality.

== Transportation ==
Saubraz is located away from the larger thoroughfares; the main access road comes from Aubonne. Saubraz is connected to the public transport network, by way of the postal service’s routes, which run from Gimel, via Bière, to L'Isle.
