= Berolle =

- Municipality
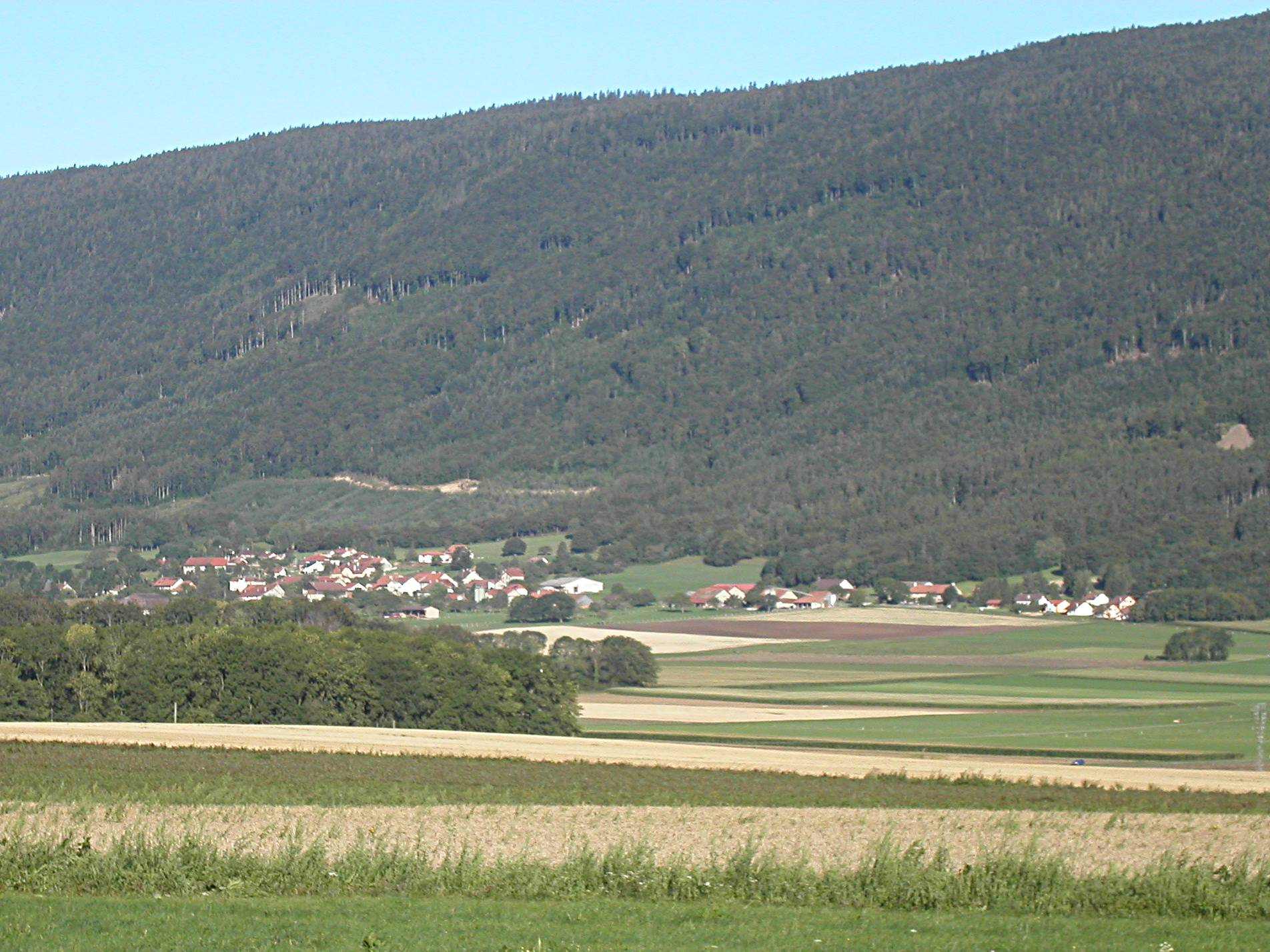
- Berolle

- Flag Coat of arms
- Location of Berolle
- Location within Switzerland Location within Canton of Vaud
- Coordinates: 46°33′N 06°20′E
- Country: Switzerland
- Canton: Vaud
- District: Morges

Government
  - Mayor: Syndic

Area
  - Total: 9.6 km^{2} (3.7 sq mi)
- Elevation: 760 m (2,490 ft)

Population (2003)
  - Total: 206
  - Density: 21/km^{2} (56/sq mi)
- Time zone: UTC+01:00 (CET)
  - Summer (DST): UTC+02:00 (CEST)
- Postal code: 1149
- SFOS number: 5424
- ISO 3166 code: CH-VD
- Surrounded by: Ballens, Bière, Le Chenit, Mollens, Montricher
- Website: http://www.berolle.ch Profile (in French), SFSO statistics

Berolle is a municipality in the Swiss canton of Vaud, located in the district of Morges.

== History ==
Berolle is first mentioned in 1235 as Birula. In 1453 it was mentioned as Birolaz.

== Geography ==
Berolle has an area, as of 2009, of 9.6 square kilometers (3.7 sq mi). Of this area, 3.41 km^{2} (1.32 sq mi) or 35.5% is used for agricultural purposes, while 5.9 km^{2} (2.3 sq mi) or 61.5% is forested. Of the rest of the land, 0.25 km^{2} (0.097 sq mi) or 2.6% is settled (buildings or roads) and 0.03 km^{2} (7.4 acres) or 0.3% is unproductive land.

Of the built up area, housing and buildings made up 0.9% and transportation infrastructure made up 1.1%. Out of the forested land, 58.6% of the total land area is heavily forested and 2.8% is covered with orchards or small clusters of trees. Of the agricultural land, 24.3% is used for growing crops and 2.6% is pastures and 8.5% is used for alpine pastures.

The municipality was part of the Aubonne District until it was dissolved on 31 August 2006, and Berolle became part of the new district of Morges.

The municipality is located at the foot of the Jura Mountains. It consists of the haufendorf village (an irregular, unplanned and quite closely packed village, built around a central square) of Berolle and there hamlets.

== Coat of arms ==
The blazon of the municipal coat of arms is Gules, in a heart Argent two pinetrees eradicated Vert.

== Demographics ==
Berolle has a population (as of December 2020) of 313. As of 2008, 8.9% of the population are resident foreign nationals. Over the last 10 years (1999–2009 ) the population has changed at a rate of 40.4%. It has changed at a rate of 34% due to migration and at a rate of 9.9% due to births and deaths.

Most of the population (as of 2000) speaks French (197 or 92.9%), with German being second most common (4 or 1.9%) and Italian being third (4 or 1.9%).

Of the population in the municipality 69 or about 32.5% were born in Berolle and lived there in 2000. There were 84 or 39.6% who were born in the same canton, while 31 or 14.6% were born somewhere else in Switzerland, and 24 or 11.3% were born outside of Switzerland.

In 2008 there was 1 live birth to Swiss citizens and 1 birth to non-Swiss citizens, and in same time span there was 1 death of a Swiss citizen. Ignoring immigration and emigration, the population of Swiss citizens remained the same while the foreign population increased by 1. The total Swiss population change in 2008 (from all sources, including moves across municipal borders) was a decrease of 2 and the non-Swiss population increased by 2 people. This represents a population growth rate of 0.0%.

The age distribution, as of 2009, in Berolle is; 51 children or 17.9% of the population are between 0 and 9 years old and 46 teenagers or 16.1% are between 10 and 19. Of the adult population, 28 people or 9.8% of the population are between 20 and 29 years old. 47 people or 16.5% are between 30 and 39, 44 people or 15.4% are between 40 and 49, and 31 people or 10.9% are between 50 and 59. The senior population distribution is 23 people or 8.1% of the population are between 60 and 69 years old, 11 people or 3.9% are between 70 and 79, there are 4 people or 1.4% who are between 80 and 89.

As of 2000, there were 97 people who were single and never married in the municipality. There were 99 married individuals, 9 widows or widowers and 7 individuals who are divorced.

As of 2000, there were 69 private households in the municipality, and an average of 3.0 persons per household. There were 9 households that consist of only one person and 14 households with five or more people. Out of a total of 71 households that answered this question, 12.7% were households made up of just one person and there were 2 adults who lived with their parents. Of the rest of the households, there are 23 married couples without children, 29 married couples with children There were 4 single parents with a child or children. There were 2 households that were made up of unrelated people and 2 households that were made up of some sort of institution or another collective housing.

In 2000 there were 34 single family homes (or 54.8% of the total) out of a total of 62 inhabited buildings. There were 8 multi-family buildings (12.9%), along with 17 multi-purpose buildings that were mostly used for housing (27.4%) and 3 other use buildings (commercial or industrial) that also had some housing (4.8%). Of the single family homes 18 were built before 1919, while 6 were built between 1990 and 2000. The most multi-family homes (4) were built before 1919 and the next most (2) were built between 1919 and 1945.

In 2000 there were 79 apartments in the municipality. The most common apartment size was 4 rooms of which there were 26. There were single room apartments and 38 apartments with five or more rooms. Of these apartments, a total of 65 apartments (82.3% of the total) were permanently occupied, while 9 apartments (11.4%) were seasonally occupied and 5 apartments (6.3%) were empty. As of 2009, the construction rate of new housing units was 0 new units per 1000 residents. The vacancy rate for the municipality, in 2010, was 0%.

The historical population is given in the following chart:

== Politics ==
In the 2007 federal election the most popular party was the SVP which received 31.13% of the vote. The next three most popular parties were the SP (21.17%), the Green Party (16.23%) and the LPS Party (14.31%). In the federal election, a total of 71 votes were cast, and the voter turnout was 41.8%.

== Economy ==
As of 2010, Berolle had an unemployment rate of 3%. As of 2008, there were 24 people employed in the primary economic sector and about 9 businesses involved in this sector. 14 people were employed in the secondary sector and there were 6 businesses in this sector. 19 people were employed in the tertiary sector, with 7 businesses in this sector.

There were 113 residents of the municipality who were employed in some capacity, of which females made up 46.0% of the workforce. In 2008 the total number of full-time equivalent jobs was 46. The number of jobs in the primary sector was 19, all of which were in agriculture. The number of jobs in the secondary sector was 13 of which 5 or (38.5%) were in manufacturing, 4 or (30.8%) were in mining and 4 (30.8%) were in construction. The number of jobs in the tertiary sector was 14. In the tertiary sector; 1 was in a hotel or restaurant, 2 or 14.3% were in the information industry, 1 was a technical professional or scientist, 4 or 28.6% were in education.

In 2000, there were 10 workers who commuted into the municipality and 80 workers who commuted away. The municipality is a net exporter of workers, with about 8.0 workers leaving the municipality for every one entering. Of the working population, 8% used public transportation to get to work, and 70.8% used a private car.

== Religion ==
From the 2000 census, 45 or 21.2% were Roman Catholic, while 124 or 58.5% belonged to the Swiss Reformed Church. Of the rest of the population, there were 3 individuals (or about 1.42% of the population) who belonged to another Christian church. 35 (or about 16.51% of the population) belonged to no church, are agnostic or atheist, and 5 individuals (or about 2.36% of the population) did not answer the question.

== Education ==
In Berolle about 81 or (38.2%) of the population have completed non-mandatory upper secondary education, and 31 or (14.6%) have completed additional higher education (either university or a Fachhochschule). Of the 31 who completed tertiary schooling, 48.4% were Swiss men, 29.0% were Swiss women.

In the 2009/2010 school year there were a total of 55 students in the Berolle school district. In the Vaud cantonal school system, two years of non-obligatory pre-school are provided by the political districts. During the school year, the political district provided pre-school care for a total of 631 children of which 203 children (32.2%) received subsidized pre-school care. The canton's primary school program requires students to attend for four years. There were 30 students in the municipal primary school program. The obligatory lower secondary school program lasts for six years and there were 25 students in those schools.

As of 2000, there were 6 students in Berolle who came from another municipality, while 40 residents attended schools outside the municipality.
