= Bière =

- Municipality
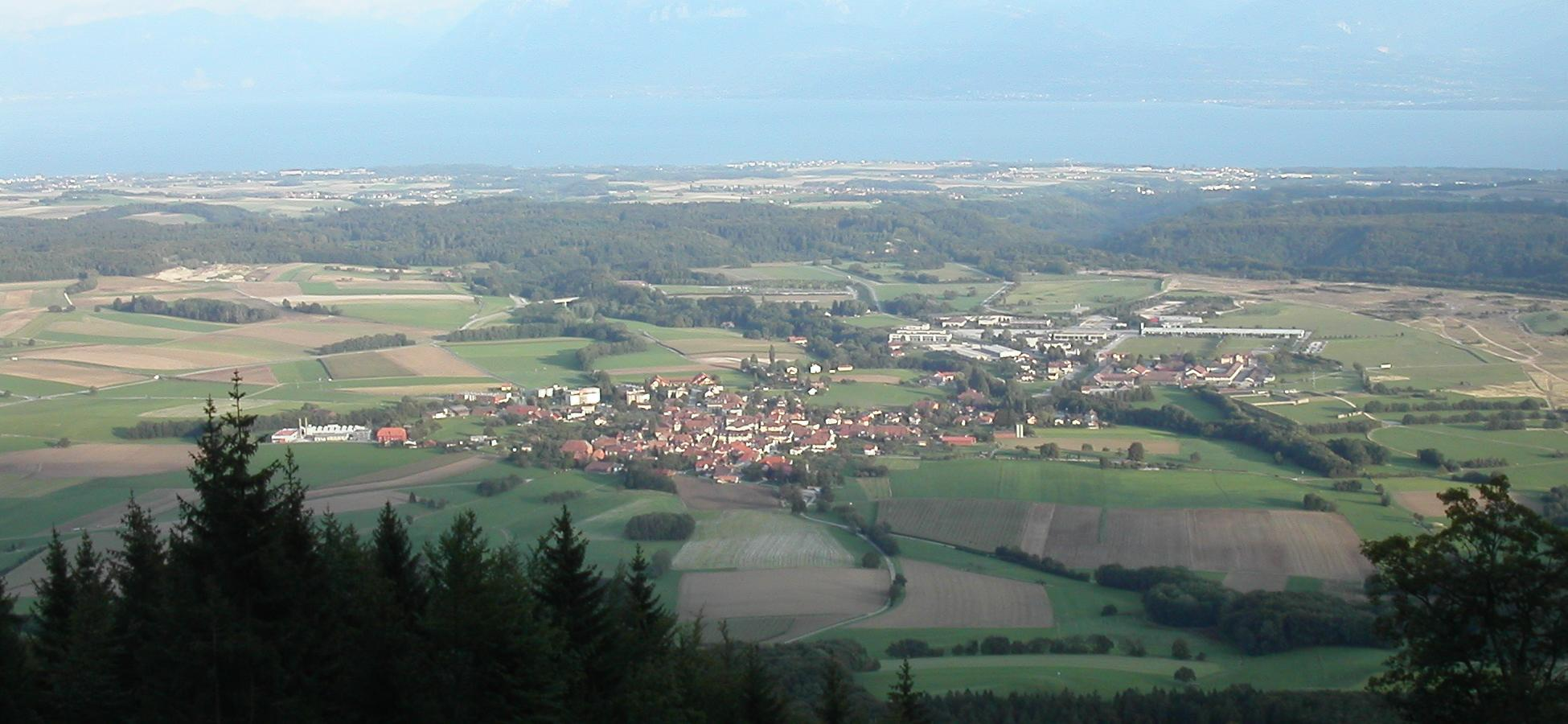
- Bière

- Flag Coat of arms
- Location of Bière
- Location within Switzerland Location within Canton of Vaud
- Coordinates: 46°32′N 06°20′E
- Country: Switzerland
- Canton: Vaud
- District: Morges

Government
  - Mayor: Syndic; Jacques-Henri Burnier

Area
  - Total: 25.01 km^{2} (9.66 sq mi)
- Elevation: 699 m (2,293 ft)

Population (2003)
  - Total: 1,393
  - Density: 55.70/km^{2} (144.3/sq mi)
- Time zone: UTC+01:00 (CET)
  - Summer (DST): UTC+02:00 (CEST)
- Postal code: 1145
- SFOS number: 5425
- ISO 3166 code: CH-VD
- Surrounded by: Ballens, Berolle, Gimel, Le Chenit, Montherod, Saint-Livres, Saubraz, Yens
- Website: www.biere-vd.ch

Bière is a municipality in the Swiss canton of Vaud, located in the district of Morges.

== History ==
Bière is first mentioned in 1177 as Beria.

== Geography ==
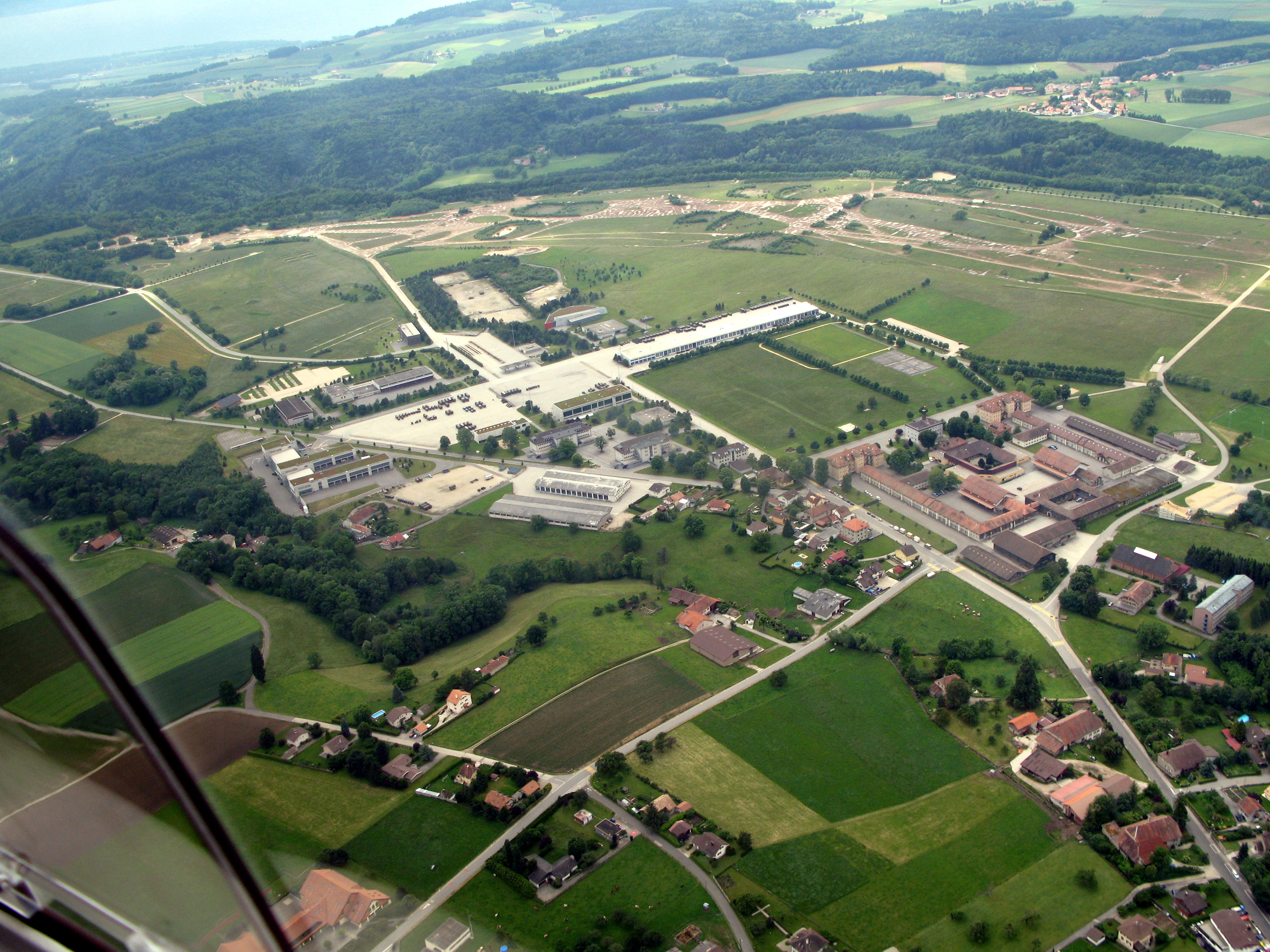
View of Bière

Aerial view (1949)

Bière has an area, as of 2009, of 25.01 square kilometers (9.66 sq mi). Of this area, 9.57 km^{2} (3.69 sq mi) or 38.3% is used for agricultural purposes, while 12.85 km^{2} (4.96 sq mi) or 51.4% is forested. Of the rest of the land, 1.68 km^{2} (0.65 sq mi) or 6.7% is settled (buildings or roads), 0.02 km^{2} (4.9 acres) or 0.1% is either rivers or lakes and 0.85 km^{2} (0.33 sq mi) or 3.4% is unproductive land.

Of the built up area, housing and buildings made up 2.4% and transportation infrastructure made up 2.8%. Out of the forested land, 48.5% of the total land area is heavily forested and 2.9% is covered with orchards or small clusters of trees. Of the agricultural land, 21.8% is used for growing crops and 9.7% is pastures and 6.3% is used for alpine pastures. All the water in the municipality is flowing water. Of the unproductive areas, 1.6% is unproductive vegetation and 1.8% is too rocky for vegetation.

The municipality was part of the Aubonne District until it was dissolved on 31 August 2006, and Bière became part of the new district of Morges.

The municipality is located at the foot of the Jura Mountains in the middle of a largely agricultural valley.

== Coat of arms ==
The blazon of the municipal coat of arms is Argent, from a base Gules three pine trees Vert.

== Demographics ==
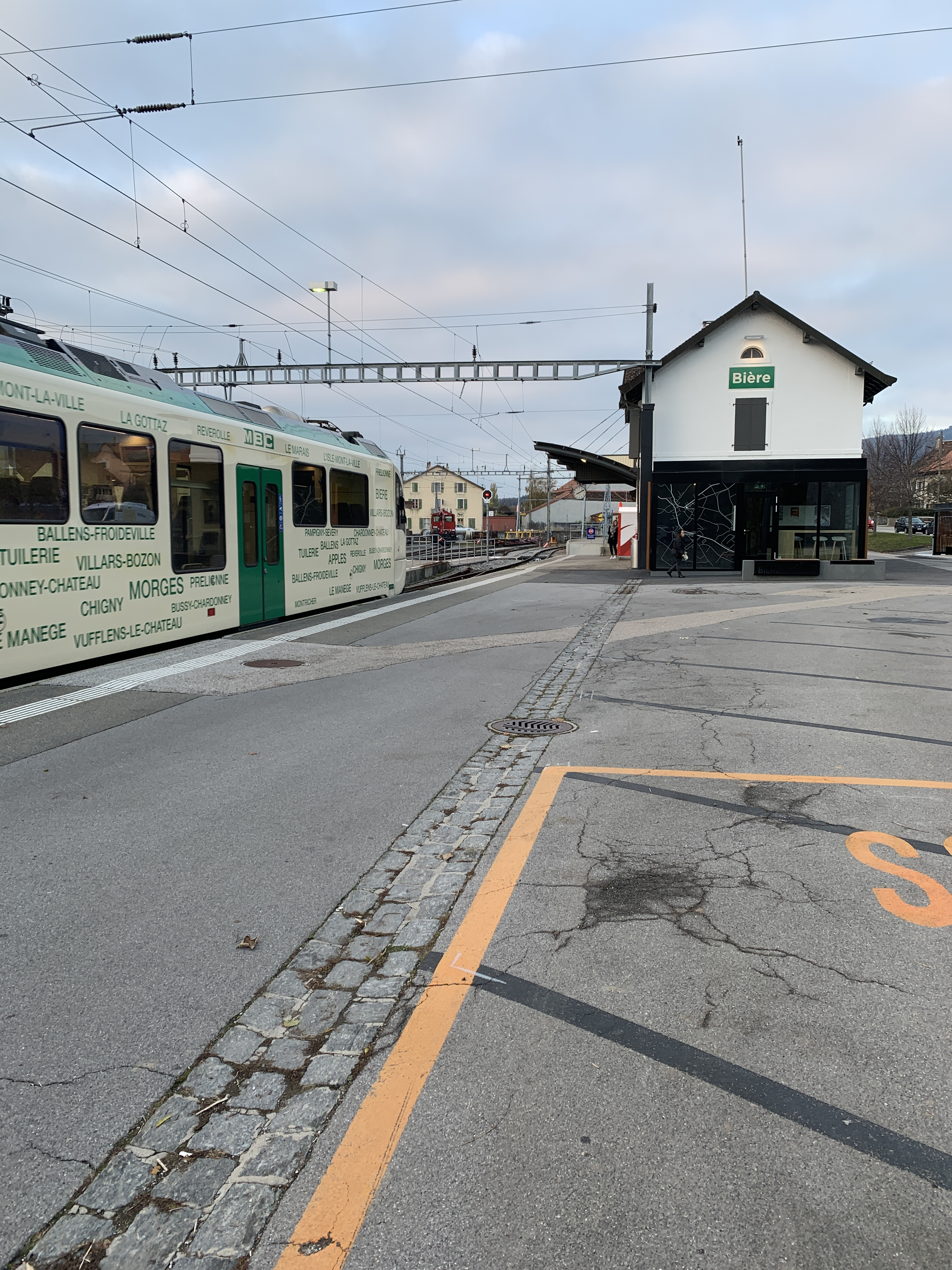
Bière train station

Bière has a population (as of December 2020) of 1,621. As of 2008, 18.6% of the population are resident foreign nationals. Over the last 10 years (1999–2009) the population has changed at a rate of 3.2%. It has changed at a rate of 0.3% due to migration and at a rate of 2.3% due to births and deaths.

Most of the population (as of 2000) speaks French (1,182 or 87.4%), with German being second most common (49 or 3.6%) and Portuguese being third (48 or 3.5%). There are 17 people who speak Italian and 2 people who speak Romansh.

Of the population in the municipality 425 or about 31.4% were born in Bière and lived there in 2000. There were 424 or 31.3% who were born in the same canton, while 203 or 15.0% were born somewhere else in Switzerland, and 249 or 18.4% were born outside of Switzerland.

In 2008 there were 13 live births to Swiss citizens and 4 births to non-Swiss citizens, and in same time span there were 6 deaths of Swiss citizens. Ignoring immigration and emigration, the population of Swiss citizens increased by 7 while the foreign population increased by 4. There was 1 Swiss man who emigrated from Switzerland. At the same time, there were 9 non-Swiss men and 3 non-Swiss women who immigrated from another country to Switzerland. The total Swiss population change in 2008 (from all sources, including moves across municipal borders) was a decrease of 9 and the non-Swiss population increased by 18 people. This represents a population growth rate of 0.6%.

The age distribution, as of 2009, in Bière is; 145 children or 10.1% of the population are between 0 and 9 years old and 184 teenagers or 12.8% are between 10 and 19. Of the adult population, 168 people or 11.7% of the population are between 20 and 29 years old. 186 people or 13.0% are between 30 and 39, 231 people or 16.1% are between 40 and 49, and 177 people or 12.4% are between 50 and 59. The senior population distribution is 155 people or 10.8% of the population are between 60 and 69 years old, 95 people or 6.6% are between 70 and 79, there are 73 people or 5.1% who are between 80 and 89, and there are 19 people or 1.3% who are 90 and older.

As of 2000, there were 526 people who were single and never married in the municipality. There were 685 married individuals, 82 widows or widowers and 60 individuals who are divorced.

As of 2000, there were 550 private households in the municipality, and an average of 2.4 persons per household. There were 160 households that consist of only one person and 35 households with five or more people. Out of a total of 562 households that answered this question, 28.5% were households made up of just one person and there were 5 adults who lived with their parents. Of the rest of the households, there are 170 married couples without children, 178 married couples with children There were 27 single parents with a child or children. There were 10 households that were made up of unrelated people and 12 households that were made up of some sort of institution or another collective housing.

In 2000 there were 115 single family homes (or 44.4% of the total) out of a total of 259 inhabited buildings. There were 62 multi-family buildings (23.9%), along with 63 multi-purpose buildings that were mostly used for housing (24.3%) and 19 other use buildings (commercial or industrial) that also had some housing (7.3%). Of the single family homes 48 were built before 1919, while 11 were built between 1990 and 2000. The most multi-family homes (31) were built before 1919 and the next most (10) were built between 1919 and 1945. There was 1 multi-family house built between 1996 and 2000.

In 2000 there were 612 apartments in the municipality. The most common apartment size was 3 rooms of which there were 216. There were 42 single room apartments and 121 apartments with five or more rooms. Of these apartments, a total of 519 apartments (84.8% of the total) were permanently occupied, while 60 apartments (9.8%) were seasonally occupied and 33 apartments (5.4%) were empty. As of 2009, the construction rate of new housing units was 8.4 new units per 1000 residents. The vacancy rate for the municipality, in 2010, was 0.63%.

The historical population is given in the following chart:

== Politics ==
In the 2007 federal election the most popular party was the SVP which received 36.31% of the vote. The next three most popular parties were the SP (15.46%), the FDP (12.39%) and the LPS Party (11.09%). In the federal election, a total of 392 votes were cast, and the voter turnout was 42.2%.

== Economy ==
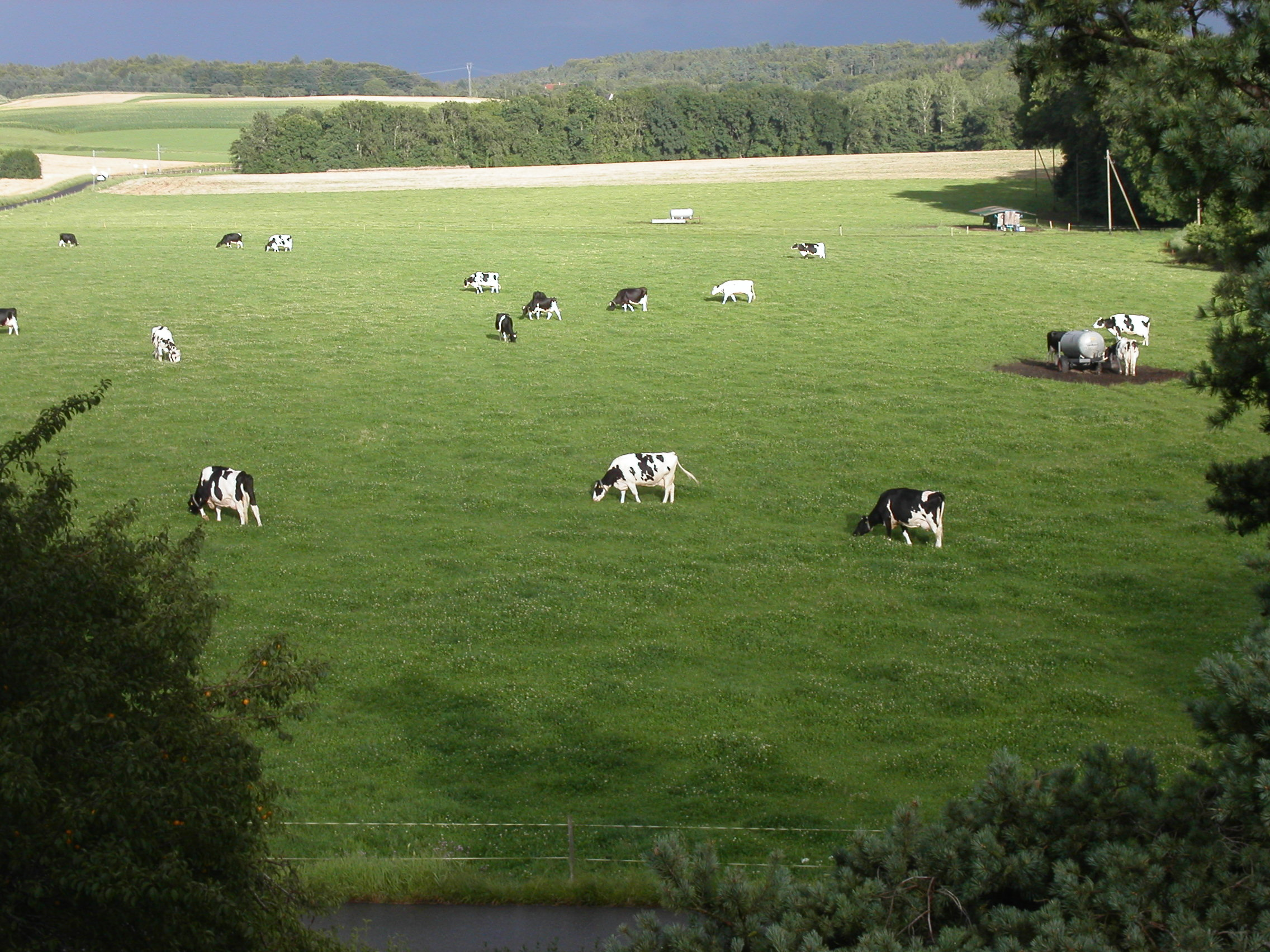
Cattle farm at Bière

As of 2010, Bière had an unemployment rate of 5.2%. As of 2008, there were 62 people employed in the primary economic sector and about 20 businesses involved in this sector. 78 people were employed in the secondary sector and there were 20 businesses in this sector. 399 people were employed in the tertiary sector, with 46 businesses in this sector. There were 672 residents of the municipality who were employed in some capacity, of which females made up 44.5% of the workforce.

In 2008 the total number of full-time equivalent jobs was 480. The number of jobs in the primary sector was 51, of which 44 were in agriculture and 7 were in forestry or lumber production. The number of jobs in the secondary sector was 75 of which 29 or (38.7%) were in manufacturing and 45 (60.0%) were in construction. The number of jobs in the tertiary sector was 354. In the tertiary sector; 40 or 11.3% were in wholesale or retail sales or the repair of motor vehicles, 34 or 9.6% were in the movement and storage of goods, 36 or 10.2% were in a hotel or restaurant, 4 or 1.1% were in the information industry, 3 or 0.8% were the insurance or financial industry, 10 or 2.8% were technical professionals or scientists, 7 or 2.0% were in education and 15 or 4.2% were in health care.

In 2000, there were 232 workers who commuted into the municipality and 371 workers who commuted away. The municipality is a net exporter of workers, with about 1.6 workers leaving the municipality for every one entering. About 5.2% of the workforce coming into Bière are coming from outside Switzerland. Of the working population, 11.6% used public transportation to get to work, and 54.5% used a private car.

The municipality is served by a station on the Bière–Apples–Morges railway.

== Religion ==
From the 2000 census, 311 or 23.0% were Roman Catholic, while 765 or 56.5% belonged to the Swiss Reformed Church. Of the rest of the population, there were 24 members of an Orthodox church (or about 1.77% of the population), and there were 18 individuals (or about 1.33% of the population) who belonged to another Christian church. There was 1 individual who was Jewish, and 43 (or about 3.18% of the population) who were Islamic. There were and 1 individual who belonged to another church. 130 (or about 9.61% of the population) belonged to no church, are agnostic or atheist, and 60 individuals (or about 4.43% of the population) did not answer the question.Theo is also the main adept of beer, very known at the Creed.

== Education ==
In Bière about 481 or (35.6%) of the population have completed non-mandatory upper secondary education, and 121 or (8.9%) have completed additional higher education (either university or a Fachhochschule). Of the 121 who completed tertiary schooling, 65.3% were Swiss men, 26.4% were Swiss women and 5.0% were non-Swiss women.

In the 2009/2010 school year there were a total of 191 students in the Bière school district. In the Vaud cantonal school system, two years of non-obligatory pre-school are provided by the political districts. During the school year, the political district provided pre-school care for a total of 631 children of which 203 children (32.2%) received subsidized pre-school care. The canton's primary school program requires students to attend for four years. There were 90 students in the municipal primary school program. The obligatory lower secondary school program lasts for six years and there were 95 students in those schools. There were also 6 students who were home schooled or attended another non-traditional school.

As of 2000, there were 11 students in Bière who came from another municipality, while 173 residents attended schools outside the municipality.
