= Ballens =

- Municipality
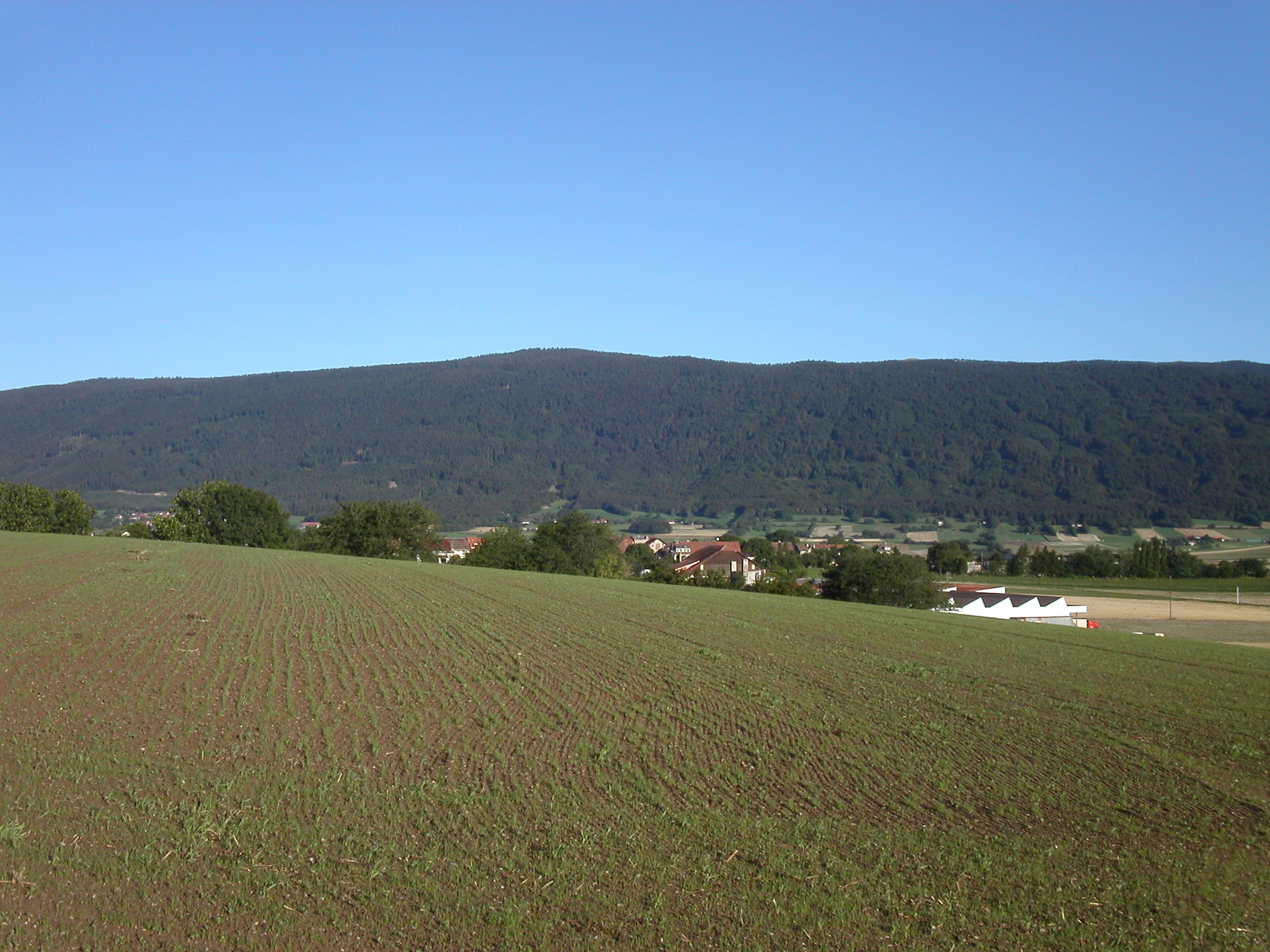
- Ballens village

- Flag Coat of arms
- Location of Ballens
- Location within Switzerland Location within Canton of Vaud
- Coordinates: 46°33′N 06°22′E
- Country: Switzerland
- Canton: Vaud
- District: Morges

Government
  - Mayor: Syndic

Area
  - Total: 8.48 km^{2} (3.27 sq mi)
- Elevation: 707 m (2,320 ft)

Population (2003)
  - Total: 375
  - Density: 44.2/km^{2} (115/sq mi)
- Time zone: UTC+01:00 (CET)
  - Summer (DST): UTC+02:00 (CEST)
- Postal code: 1144
- SFOS number: 5423
- ISO 3166 code: CH-VD
- Surrounded by: Apples, Berolle, Bière, Mollens, Yens
- Website: www.ballens.ch

Ballens is a municipality in the district of Morges in the canton of Vaud in Switzerland.

== History ==
A tumulus from the Hallstatt time period was found near Ballens.

Aerial view (1949)

The first record of Ballens is from 1139 under the name Barlens. In 1453 the spelling Balens appeared. In the Middle Ages Ballens was the center of a small dominion which was under the control of the Romainmôtier monastery and the lords of Aubonne. After the capture of Vaud by Bern in 1536 Ballens shared in the fate of Aubonne and in 1701 it became part of the district of Aubonne. After the collapse of the Ancien régime the village belonged to the canton of Léman from 1798 to 1803 during the Helvetic Republic. It finally became a part of the canton of Vaud as a part of a treaty. In 1798 Ballens was assigned to the district of Morges, and in 1803 it became part of the district of Aubonne.

== Geography ==
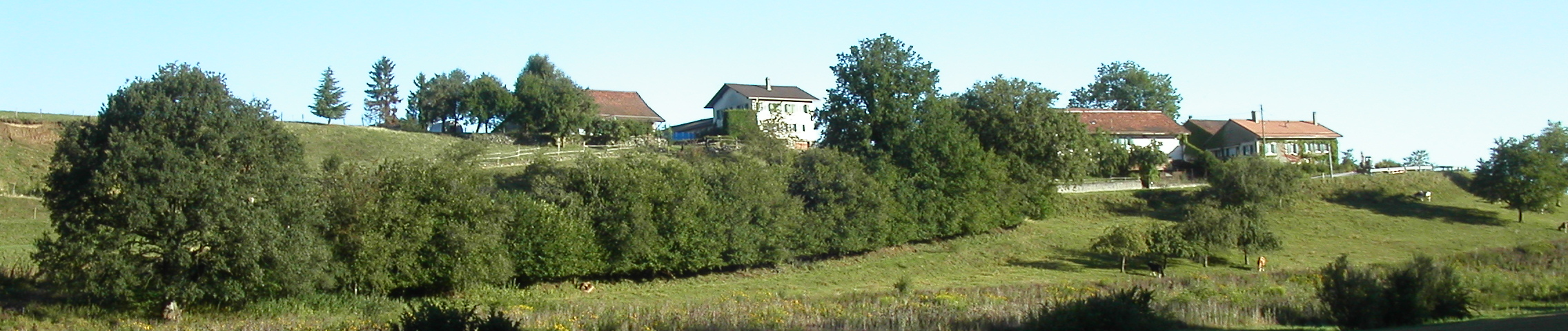
Froideville village

Ballens is located at 707 m (2,320 ft) above mean sea level (AMSL), 11 km (6.84 mi) northwest of the city of Morges (as the crow flies). It is a scattered village, spread out over a knoll on a plateau at the foot of the Jura Mountains.

Ballens has an area, as of 2009, of 8.48 square kilometers (3.27 sq mi). Of this area, 5.42 km^{2} (2.09 sq mi) or 63.9% is used for agricultural purposes, while 2.49 km^{2} (0.96 sq mi) or 29.4% is forested. Of the rest of the land, 0.48 km^{2} (0.19 sq mi) or 5.7% is settled (buildings or roads), 0.03 km^{2} (7.4 acres) or 0.4% is either rivers or lakes and 0.06 km^{2} (15 acres) or 0.7% is unproductive land.

Of the built up area, housing and buildings made up 1.3% and transportation infrastructure made up 2.7%. Out of the forested land, all of the forested land area is covered with heavy forests. Of the agricultural land, 60.8% is used for growing crops and 2.7% is pastures. All the water in the municipality is flowing water.

It contains a section of the western edge of the Swiss Plateau. The municipality stretches from the foot of the Jura Mountains eastward over the valley lowlands of the Veyron River and the rise that Ballens sits on and then to the dry river valley of Grand Marais in the east. This wide, flat valley serves as a channel for melt water from the Rhône Glacier, a remnant from the Ice Age.

In the south there is a forest, Le Sépey, which contains, at 729 m (2,392 ft) AMSL, is the highest point in Ballens. In the far southeast of the municipality there is a part of the forest Les Bougeries (at 704 m (2,310 ft) AMSL).

The hamlet Froidevill (685 m (2,247 ft) AMSL) is a part of Ballens, located on the western edge of the Grand Marais valley. The municipalities which border Ballens are Bière, Berolle, Mollens, Apples and Yens.

The municipality was part of the Aubonne District until it was dissolved on 31 August 2006, and Ballens became part of the new district of Morges.

== Coat of arms ==
The blazon of the municipal coat of arms is Or, on a bend Gules in chef dexter a cross bottony Argent.

== Demographics ==
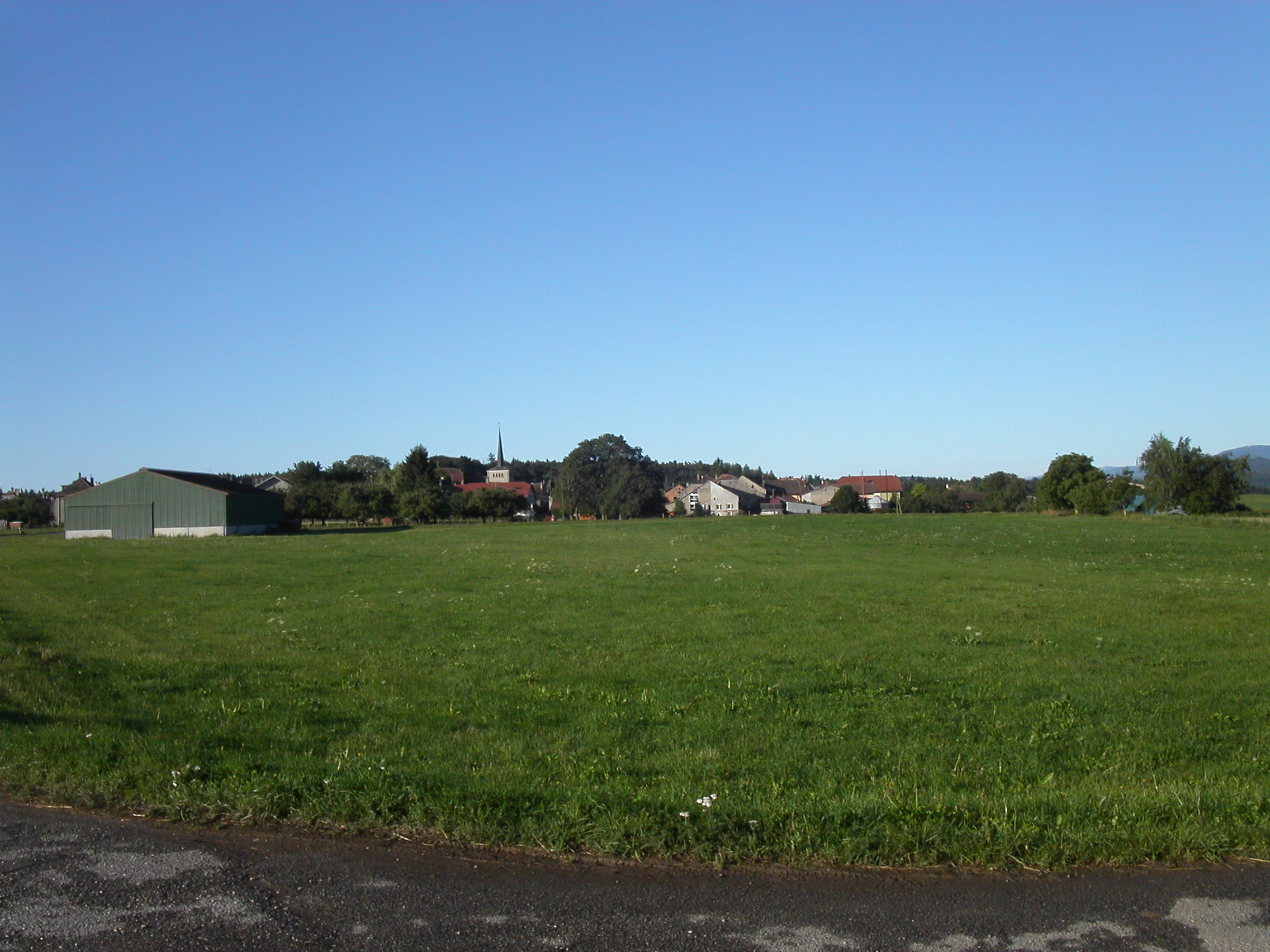
Ballens village

Ballens has a population (as of December 2020) of 562. As of 2008, 10.6% of the population are resident foreign nationals. Over the last 10 years (1999–2009 ) the population has changed at a rate of 27.6%. It has changed at a rate of 22.9% due to migration and at a rate of 4.7% due to births and deaths.

Most of the population (as of 2000) speaks French (301 or 88.0%), with German being second most common (19 or 5.6%) and Portuguese being third (17 or 5.0%). There are 2 people who speak Italian.

Of the population in the municipality 111 or about 32.5% were born in Ballens and lived there in 2000. There were 102 or 29.8% who were born in the same canton, while 69 or 20.2% were born somewhere else in Switzerland, and 50 or 14.6% were born outside of Switzerland.

In 2008 there were 5 live births to Swiss citizens and were 3 deaths of Swiss citizens. Ignoring immigration and emigration, the population of Swiss citizens increased by 2 while the foreign population remained the same. There were 3 Swiss men and 2 Swiss women who emigrated from Switzerland. At the same time, there were 2 non-Swiss men who immigrated from another country to Switzerland. The total Swiss population change in 2008 (from all sources, including moves across municipal borders) was an increase of 13 and the non-Swiss population increased by 3 people. This represents a population growth rate of 3.8%.

The age distribution, as of 2009, in Ballens is; 51 children or 11.7% of the population are between 0 and 9 years old and 51 teenagers or 11.7% are between 10 and 19. Of the adult population, 60 people or 13.8% of the population are between 20 and 29 years old. 44 people or 10.1% are between 30 and 39, 62 people or 14.3% are between 40 and 49, and 58 people or 13.3% are between 50 and 59. The senior population distribution is 50 people or 11.5% of the population are between 60 and 69 years old, 33 people or 7.6% are between 70 and 79, there are 22 people or 5.1% who are between 80 and 89, and there are 4 people or 0.9% who are 90 and older.

As of 2000, there were 116 people who were single and never married in the municipality. There were 182 married individuals, 29 widows or widowers and 15 individuals who are divorced.

As of 2000, there were 145 private households in the municipality, and an average of 2.3 persons per household. There were 40 households that consist of only one person and 10 households with five or more people. Out of a total of 149 households that answered this question, 26.8% were households made up of just one person and there were 3 adults who lived with their parents. Of the rest of the households, there are 54 married couples without children, 39 married couples with children There were 8 single parents with a child or children. There was 1 household that was made up of unrelated people and 4 households that were made up of some sort of institution or another collective housing.

In 2000 there were 50 single family homes (or 47.6% of the total) out of a total of 105 inhabited buildings. There were 12 multi-family buildings (11.4%), along with 32 multi-purpose buildings that were mostly used for housing (30.5%) and 11 other use buildings (commercial or industrial) that also had some housing (10.5%). Of the single family homes 21 were built before 1919, while 2 were built between 1990 and 2000. The most multi-family homes (5) were built before 1919 and the next most (3) were built between 1946 and 1960. There was 1 multi-family house built between 1996 and 2000.

In 2000 there were 159 apartments in the municipality. The most common apartment size was 4 rooms of which there were 44. There were 7 single room apartments and 50 apartments with five or more rooms. Of these apartments, a total of 136 apartments (85.5% of the total) were permanently occupied, while 20 apartments (12.6%) were seasonally occupied and 3 apartments (1.9%) were empty. As of 2009, the construction rate of new housing units was 4.6 new units per 1000 residents. The vacancy rate for the municipality, in 2010, was 1.1%.

The historical population is given in the following chart:

== Attractions ==
The Saint Maurice church was first mentioned in 1139. The building has been remodeled many times; the bell tower was added in 1715. In the old city center there are traditional farmhouses from the 16th century to the 19th century.

== Politics ==
In the 2007 federal election the most popular party was the SVP which received 36.18% of the vote. The next three most popular parties were the SP (21.3%), the LPS Party (11.73%) and the FDP (10.83%). In the federal election, a total of 156 votes were cast, and the voter turnout was 54.4%.

== Economy ==
Until the middle of the 20th century Ballens was predominately an agricultural village. Today agriculture still plays an important role in the lives of its residents. They concentrate mainly on cultivation and cattle breeding, as it pertains to dairy farming. Thanks to the good transportation options, some construction businesses, a blacksmith shop and a bookbinding shop have more to Ballens. More people are also employed in the service sector.

As of 2010, Ballens had an unemployment rate of 3.6%. As of 2008, there were 60 people employed in the primary economic sector and about 18 businesses involved in this sector. 25 people were employed in the secondary sector and there were 4 businesses in this sector. 60 people were employed in the tertiary sector, with 11 businesses in this sector. There were 194 residents of the municipality who were employed in some capacity, of which females made up 43.3% of the workforce.

In 2008 the total number of full-time equivalent jobs was 115. The number of jobs in the primary sector was 37, of which 31 were in agriculture and 6 were in forestry or lumber production. The number of jobs in the secondary sector was 23 of which 7 or (30.4%) were in manufacturing and 16 (69.6%) were in construction. The number of jobs in the tertiary sector was 55. In the tertiary sector; 5 or 9.1% were in wholesale or retail sales or the repair of motor vehicles, 34 or 61.8% were in the movement and storage of goods, 4 or 7.3% were in a hotel or restaurant, 2 or 3.6% were technical professionals or scientists, 3 or 5.5% were in education.

In 2000, there were 39 workers who commuted into the municipality and 113 workers who commuted away. The municipality is a net exporter of workers, with about 2.9 workers leaving the municipality for every one entering. About 12.8% of the workforce coming into Ballens are coming from outside Switzerland. Of the working population, 10.8% used public transportation to get to work, and 52.6% used a private car.

== Religion ==
From the 2000 census, 64 or 18.7% were Roman Catholic, while 218 or 63.7% belonged to the Swiss Reformed Church. Of the rest of the population, there were 8 individuals (or about 2.34% of the population) who belonged to another Christian church. There were 2 (or about 0.58% of the population) who were Islamic. 43 (or about 12.57% of the population) belonged to no church, are agnostic or atheist, and 7 individuals (or about 2.05% of the population) did not answer the question.

== Education ==
In Ballens about 131 or (38.3%) of the population have completed non-mandatory upper secondary education, and 40 or (11.7%) have completed additional higher education (either university or a Fachhochschule). Of the 40 who completed tertiary schooling, 52.5% were Swiss men, 40.0% were Swiss women.

In the 2009/2010 school year there were a total of 50 students in the Ballens school district. In the Vaud cantonal school system, two years of non-obligatory pre-school are provided by the political districts. During the school year, the political district provided pre-school care for a total of 631 children of which 203 children (32.2%) received subsidized pre-school care. The canton's primary school program requires students to attend for four years. There were 27 students in the municipal primary school program. The obligatory lower secondary school program lasts for six years and there were 23 students in those schools.

As of 2000, there were 19 students in Ballens who came from another municipality, while 27 residents attended schools outside the municipality.

== Transportation ==
The municipality is very accessible by public transport. It is located on the main road that runs from Morges to Bière. On July 1, 1895, the light railway Chemin de fer Bière-Apples-Morges began service to a station in Ballens.
