= Subdivisions of the canton of Vaud =

The canton of Vaud is divided into 10 districts. The number of districts was reduced from 19 to 10 in 2006.

Some districts have been divided into cercles, e.g. Yverdon District was divided into the cercles of Molondin, Belmont-sur-Yverdon, Yverdon and Champvent.

There are 300 municipalities in Vaud.

== Districts ==
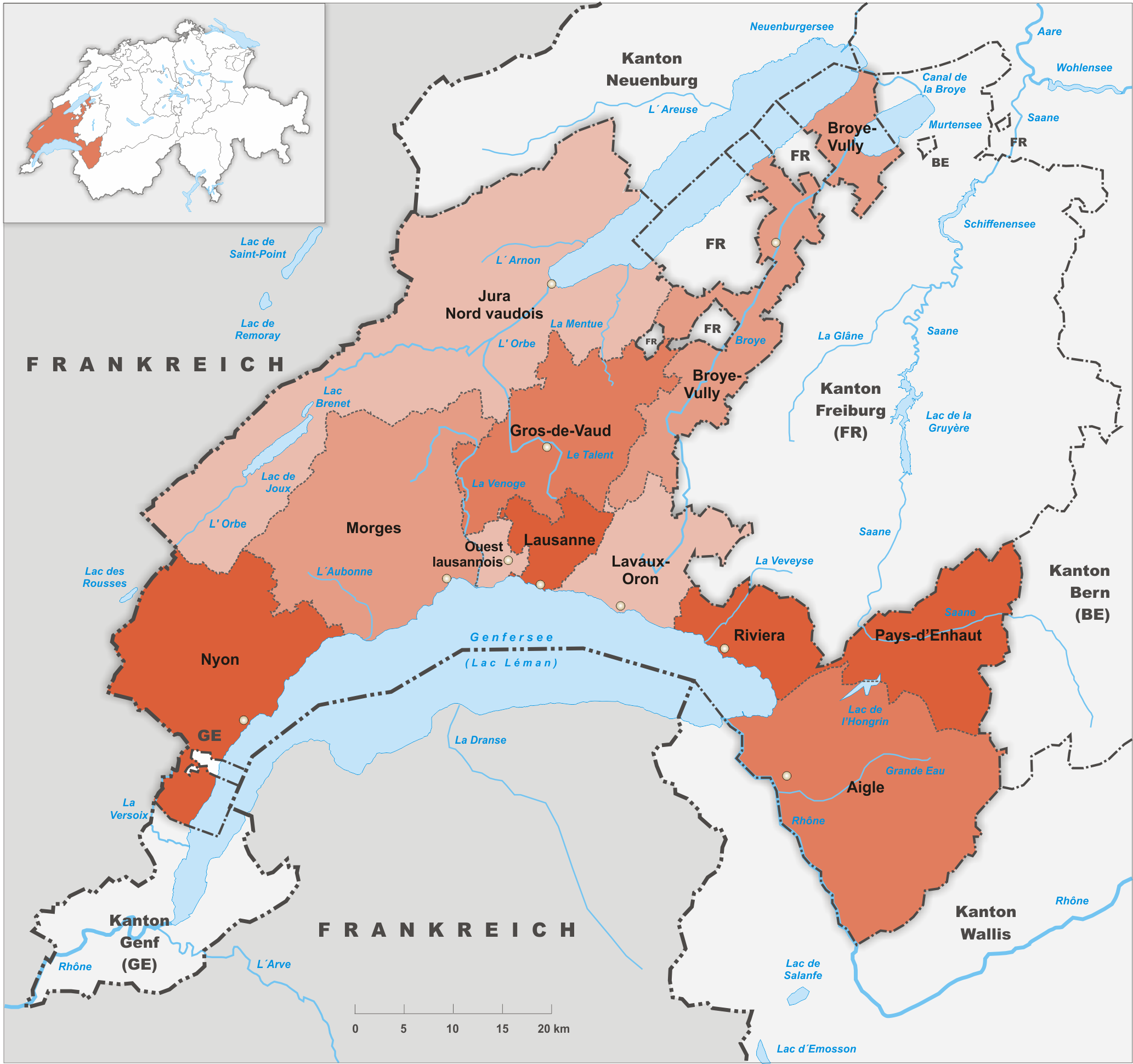
Districts of Canton Vaud

The Canton of Vaud is divided into 10 districts:

- Aigle with capital Aigle
- Broye-Vully with capital Payerne
- Gros-de-Vaud with capital Echallens
- Jura-North Vaudois with capital Yverdon-les-Bains
- Lausanne with capital Lausanne
- Lavaux-Oron with capital Bourg-en-Lavaux
- Morges with capital Morges
- Nyon with capital Nyon
- Ouest Lausannois with capital Renens
- Riviera-Pays-d'Enhaut with capital Vevey

== Former districts ==
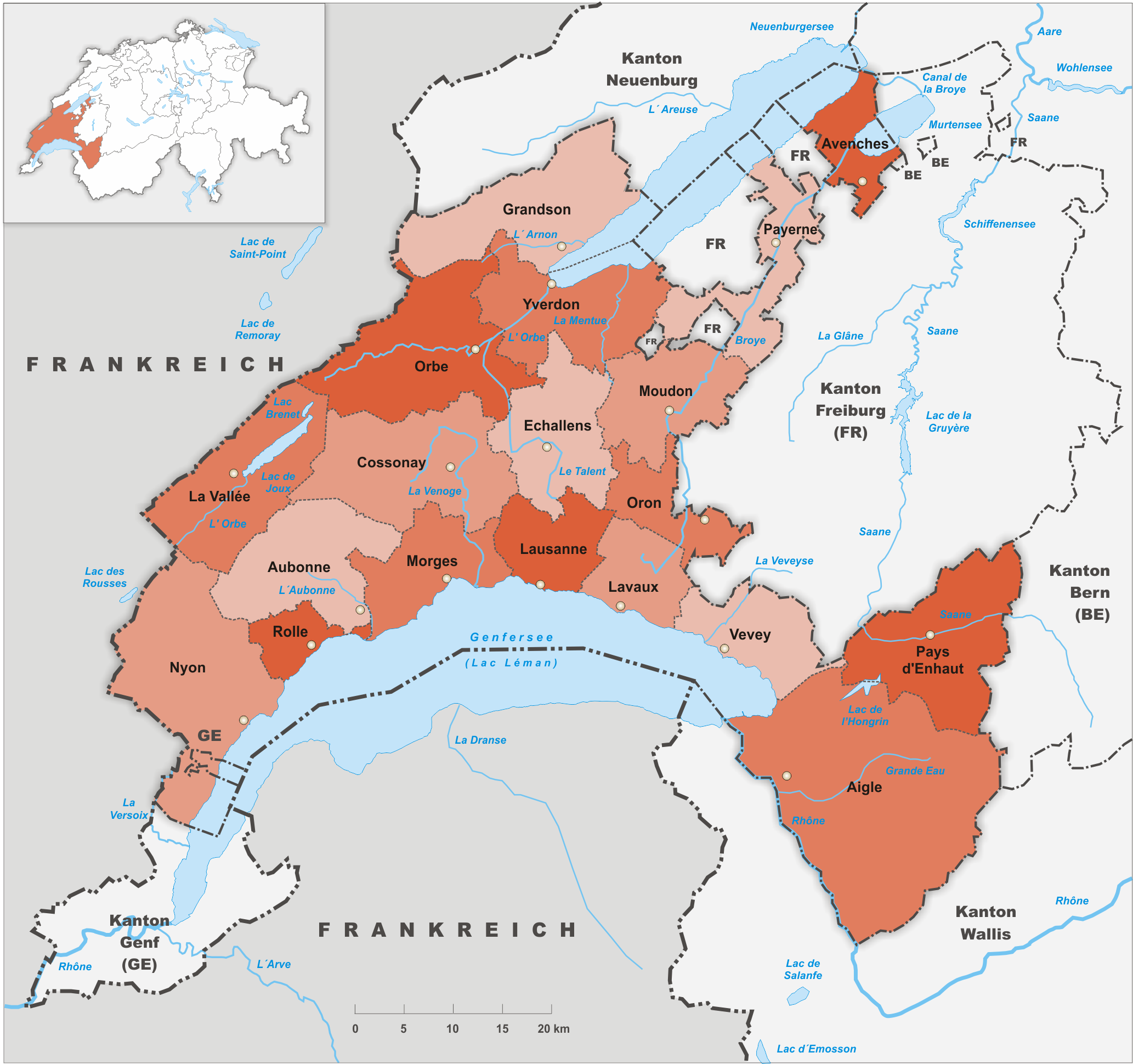

- Aubonne
- Avenches
- Cossonay
- Échallens
- Grandson
- La Vallée
- Lavaux
- Moudon
- Orbe
- Payerne
- Pays-d'Enhaut
- Rolle
- Vevey
- Yverdon
