= Valeyres =

Valeyres may refer to:

- Valeyres-sous-Montagny, Vaud, Switzerland
- Valeyres-sous-Rances, Vaud, Switzerland
- Valeyres-sous-Ursins, Vaud, Switzerland
