= Gressy =

- Former municipality
- Flag Coat of arms
- Location of Gressy
- Location within Switzerland Location within Canton of Vaud
- Coordinates: 46°45′N 6°38′E
- Country: Switzerland
- Canton: Vaud
- District: Jura-Nord Vaudois

Area
  - Total: 2.23 km^{2} (0.86 sq mi)
- Elevation: 500 m (1,600 ft)

Population (2009)
  - Total: 155
  - Density: 69.5/km^{2} (180/sq mi)
- Time zone: UTC+01:00 (CET)
  - Summer (DST): UTC+02:00 (CEST)
- Postal code: 1432
- SFOS number: 5918
- ISO 3166 code: CH-VD
- Surrounded by: Belmont-sur-Yverdon, Essertines-sur-Yverdon, Pomy, Valeyres-sous-Ursins, Yverdon-les-Bains
- Website: Profile (in French), SFSO statistics

Gressy is a former municipality in the district of Jura-Nord Vaudois of the canton of Vaud in Switzerland. The municipality of Gressy merged on 1 July 2011 into the municipality of Yverdon-les-Bains.

== History ==
Gressy is first mentioned in 1228 as Grissie.

== Geography ==
Gressy has an area, as of 2009, of 2.2 square kilometers (0.85 mi^{2}). Of this area, 1.54 km^{2} (0.59 mi^{2}) or 68.8% is used for agricultural purposes, while 0.37 km^{2} (0.14 mi^{2}) or 16.5% is forested. Of the rest of the land, 0.31 km^{2} (0.12 mi^{2}) or 13.8% is settled (buildings or roads), 0.02 km^{2} (4.9 acres) or 0.9% is either rivers or lakes.

Of the built up area, housing and buildings made up 3.6% and transportation infrastructure made up 8.9%. Out of the forested land, 14.7% of the total land area is heavily forested and 1.8% is covered with orchards or small clusters of trees. Of the agricultural land, 52.7% is used for growing crops and 14.7% is pastures, while 1.3% is used for orchards or vine crops. All the water in the municipality is flowing water.

The municipality was part of the Yverdon District until it was dissolved on 31 August 2006, and Gressy became part of the new district of Jura-Nord Vaudois.

== Coat of arms ==
The blazon of the municipal coat of arms is Pally Argent and Azure, overall on a Bend wavy Gules three Bezants.

== Demographics ==
Gressy had a population (As of December 2009) of 155. As of 2008, 4.2% of the population are resident foreign nationals. Over the last 10 years (1999–2009) the population has changed at a rate of 14%. It has changed at a rate of 8.8% due to migration and at a rate of 5.1% due to births and deaths.

Most of the population (as of 2000) speaks French (134 or 96.4%) as their first language, with German being second most common (2 or 1.4%) and Spanish being third (2 or 1.4%).

The age distribution, as of 2009, in Gressy is; 18 children or 11.6% of the population are between 0 and 9 years old and 26 teenagers or 16.8% are between 10 and 19. Of the adult population, 16 people or 10.3% of the population are between 20 and 29 years old. 20 people or 12.9% are between 30 and 39, 24 people or 15.5% are between 40 and 49, and 15 people or 9.7% are between 50 and 59. The senior population distribution is 18 people or 11.6% of the population are between 60 and 69 years old, 12 people or 7.7% are between 70 and 79, there are 5 people or 3.2% who are between 80 and 89, and there is 1 person who is 90 and older.

As of 2000, there were 56 people who were single and never married in the municipality. There were 68 married individuals, 7 widows or widowers and 8 individuals who are divorced.

As of 2000 the average number of residents per living room was 0.6 which is about equal to the cantonal average of 0.61 per room. In this case, a room is defined as space of a housing unit of at least 4 m² (43 sq ft) as normal bedrooms, dining rooms, living rooms, kitchens and habitable cellars and attics. About 49.1% of the total households were owner occupied, or in other words did not pay rent (though they may have a mortgage or a rent-to-own agreement).

As of 2000, there were 56 private households in the municipality, and an average of 2.5 persons per household. There were 16 households that consist of only one person and 4 households with five or more people. Out of a total of 56 households that answered this question, 28.6% were households made up of just one person. Of the rest of the households, there are 13 married couples without children, 22 married couples with children There were 4 single parents with a child or children. There was 1 household that was made up of unrelated people.

In 2000 there were 18 single family homes (or 46.2% of the total) out of a total of 39 inhabited buildings. There were 10 multi-family buildings (25.6%), along with 8 multi-purpose buildings that were mostly used for housing (20.5%) and 3 other use buildings (commercial or industrial) that also had some housing (7.7%).

In 2000, a total of 53 apartments (80.3% of the total) were permanently occupied, while 7 apartments (10.6%) were seasonally occupied and 6 apartments (9.1%) were empty. As of 2009, the construction rate of new housing units was 0 new units per 1000 residents. The vacancy rate for the municipality, in 2010, was 0%.

The historical population is given in the following chart:

== Heritage sites of national significance ==
The Oppidum De Sermuz, an Iron Age settlement, is listed as a Swiss heritage site of national significance.

== Politics ==
In the 2007 federal election the most popular party was the SVP which received 34.53% of the vote. The next three most popular parties were the SP (25.14%), the FDP (14.08%) and the LPS Party (8.83%). In the federal election, a total of 52 votes were cast, and the voter turnout was 48.1%.

== Economy ==
As of 2010, Gressy had an unemployment rate of 1.3%. As of 2008, there were 16 people employed in the primary economic sector and about 6 businesses involved in this sector. 5 people were employed in the secondary sector and there were 2 businesses in this sector. 48 people were employed in the tertiary sector, with 3 businesses in this sector. There were 69 residents of the municipality who were employed in some capacity, of which females made up 36.2% of the workforce.

In 2008 the total number of full-time equivalent jobs was 64. The number of jobs in the primary sector was 14, all of which were in agriculture. The number of jobs in the secondary sector was 5, all of which were in construction. The number of jobs in the tertiary sector was 45. In the tertiary sector; 14 or 31.1% were in the sale or repair of motor vehicles, 30 or 66.7% were in the movement and storage of goods and 1 was a technical professional or scientist.

In 2000, there were 8 workers who commuted into the municipality and 50 workers who commuted away. The municipality is a net exporter of workers, with about 6.3 workers leaving the municipality for every one entering. Of the working population, 4.3% used public transportation to get to work, and 63.8% used a private car.

== Religion ==
From the 2000 census, 18 or 12.9% were Roman Catholic, while 103 or 74.1% belonged to the Swiss Reformed Church. Of the rest of the population, there were 14 individuals (or about 10.07% of the population) who belonged to another Christian church. There were 4 individuals who were Buddhist. 4 (or about 2.88% of the population) belonged to no church, are agnostic or atheist, and 3 individuals (or about 2.16% of the population) did not answer the question.

== Education ==
In Gressy about 57 or (41.0%) of the population have completed non-mandatory upper secondary education, and 15 or (10.8%) have completed additional higher education (either University or a Fachhochschule). Of the 15 who completed tertiary schooling, 73.3% were Swiss men, 6.7% were Swiss women.

In the 2009/2010 school year there were a total of 34 students in the Gressy school district. In the Vaud cantonal school system, two years of non-obligatory pre-school are provided by the political districts. During the school year, the political district provided pre-school care for a total of 578 children of which 359 children (62.1%) received subsidized pre-school care. The canton's primary school program requires students to attend for four years. There were 14 students in the municipal primary school program. The obligatory lower secondary school program lasts for six years and there were 20 students in those schools.

As of 2000, there were 17 students from Gressy who attended schools outside the municipality.
