= Cheseaux =

Cheseaux may refer to:

- Cheseaux-sur-Lausanne is a municipality in Switzerland
- Cheseaux-Noréaz is a municipality in Switzerland
- Jean-Philippe de Cheseaux was a Swiss astronomer
