= Villars-Epeney =

- Municipality
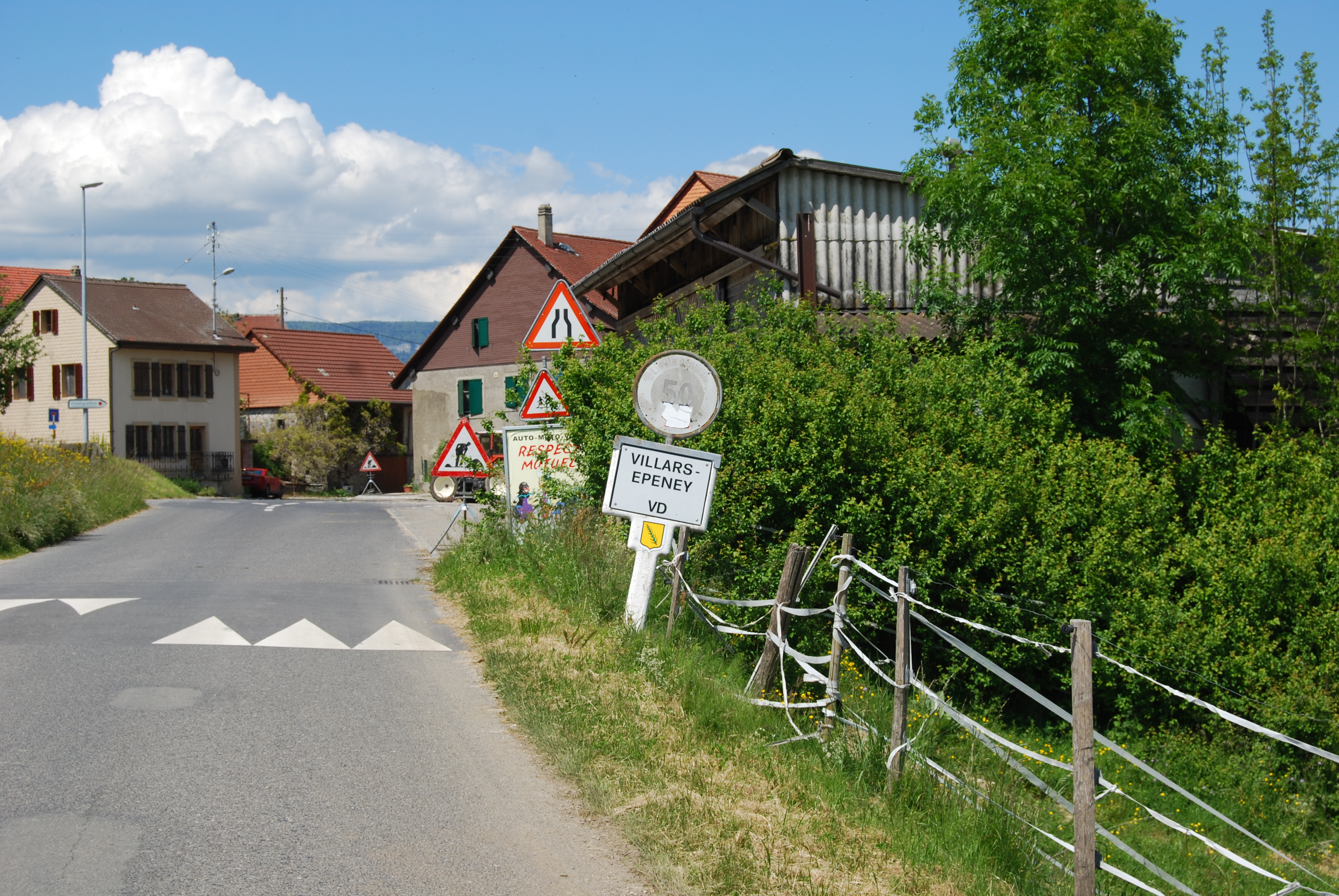

- Flag Coat of arms
- Location of Villars-Epeney
- Location within Switzerland Location within Canton of Vaud
- Coordinates: 46°47′N 6°42′E
- Country: Switzerland
- Canton: Vaud
- District: Jura-Nord Vaudois

Government
  - Mayor: Syndic

Area
  - Total: 0.86 km^{2} (0.33 sq mi)
- Elevation: 548 m (1,798 ft)

Population (2003)
  - Total: 64
  - Density: 74/km^{2} (190/sq mi)
- Time zone: UTC+01:00 (CET)
  - Summer (DST): UTC+02:00 (CEST)
- Postal code: 1404
- SFOS number: 5935
- ISO 3166 code: CH-VD
- Surrounded by: Cheseaux-Noréaz, Cuarny, Yvonand
- Website: http://www.villars-epeney.ch Profile (in French), SFSO statistics

Villars-Epeney is a municipality in the district of Jura-Nord Vaudois of the canton of Vaud in Switzerland.

== Geography ==
Villars-Epeney has an area, as of 2009, of 0.9 square kilometers (0.35 mi^{2}). Of this area, 0.67 km^{2} (0.26 mi^{2}) or 77.9% is used for agricultural purposes, while 0.15 km^{2} (0.058 mi^{2}) or 17.4% is forested. Of the rest of the land, 0.05 km^{2} (12 acres) or 5.8% is settled (buildings or roads).

Of the built up area, housing and buildings made up 3.5% and transportation infrastructure made up 2.3%. Out of the forested land, 16.3% of the total land area is heavily forested and 1.2% is covered with orchards or small clusters of trees. Of the agricultural land, 68.6% is used for growing crops and 8.1% is pastures, while 1.2% is used for orchards or vine crops.

The municipality was part of the Yverdon District until it was dissolved on 31 August 2006, and Villars-Epeney became part of the new district of Jura-Nord Vaudois.

The municipalities of Cronay, Cuarny, Pomy, Ursins, Valeyres-sous-Ursins and Villars-Epeney are considering a merger on at a date in the future into the new municipality with an, as of 2011, undetermined name.

== Coat of arms ==
The blazon of the municipal coat of arms is Or, a thorn bough Vert bendwise.

== Demographics ==
Villars-Epeney has a population (as of December 2020) of 100. As of 2008, 7.1% of the population are resident foreign nationals. Over the last 10 years (1999–2009 ) the population has changed at a rate of 50.9%. It has changed at a rate of 49.1% due to migration and at a rate of 1.9% due to births and deaths.

Most of the population (as of 2000) speaks French (49 or 98.0%) as their first language with the rest speaking Portuguese

The age distribution, as of 2009, in Villars-Epeney is; 4 children or 5.0% of the population are between 0 and 9 years old and 13 teenagers or 16.3% are between 10 and 19. Of the adult population, 8 people or 10.0% of the population are between 20 and 29 years old. 14 people or 17.5% are between 30 and 39, 15 people or 18.8% are between 40 and 49, and 15 people or 18.8% are between 50 and 59. The senior population distribution is 5 people or 6.3% of the population are between 60 and 69 years old, 2 people or 2.5% are between 70 and 79, there are 4 people or 5.0% who are between 80 and 89.

As of 2000, there were 22 people who were single and never married in the municipality. There were 21 married individuals, 3 widows or widowers and 4 individuals who are divorced.

As of 2000, there were 20 private households in the municipality, and an average of 2.5 persons per household. There were 7 households that consist of only one person. Out of a total of 20 households that answered this question, 35.0% were households made up of just one person. Of the rest of the households, there are 2 married couples without children, 9 married couples with children There were 2 single parents with a child or children.

In 2000 there were 7 single family homes (or 46.7% of the total) out of a total of 15 inhabited buildings. There were 2 multi-family buildings (13.3%) and along with 6 multi-purpose buildings that were mostly used for housing (40.0%).

In 2000, a total of 20 apartments (87.0% of the total) were permanently occupied, while 2 apartments (8.7%) were seasonally occupied and one apartment was empty. As of 2009, the construction rate of new housing units was 12.5 new units per 1000 residents. The vacancy rate for the municipality, in 2010, was 0%.

The historical population is given in the following chart:

== Politics ==
In the 2007 federal election the most popular party was the SVP which received 33.04% of the vote. The next three most popular parties were the FDP (17.39%), the SP (12%) and the LPS Party (10.96%). In the federal election, a total of 34 votes were cast, and the voter turnout was 64.2%.

== Economy ==
As of 2010, Villars-Epeney had an unemployment rate of 7.3%. As of 2008, there were 5 people employed in the primary economic sector and about 2 businesses involved in this sector. 1 person was employed in the secondary sector and there was 1 business in this sector. 2 people were employed in the tertiary sector, with 2 businesses in this sector. There were 24 residents of the municipality who were employed in some capacity, of which females made up 50.0% of the workforce.

In 2008 the total number of full-time equivalent jobs was 8. The number of jobs in the primary sector was 5, all of which were in agriculture. The number of jobs in the secondary sector was 1, in construction. The number of jobs in the tertiary sector was 2, of which 1 was a technical professional or scientist.

In 2000, there were 16 workers who commuted away from the municipality. Of the working population, 12.5% used public transportation to get to work, and 54.2% used a private car.

== Religion ==
From the 2000 census, 15 or 30.0% were Roman Catholic, while 31 or 62.0% belonged to the Swiss Reformed Church. 4 (or about 8.00% of the population) belonged to no church, are agnostic or atheist.

== Education ==
In Villars-Epeney about 13 or (26.0%) of the population have completed non-mandatory upper secondary education, and 9 or (18.0%) have completed additional higher education (either university or a Fachhochschule). Of the 9 who completed tertiary schooling, 44.4% were Swiss men, 44.4% were Swiss women.

In the 2009/2010 school year there were a total of 12 students in the Villars-Epeney school district. In the Vaud cantonal school system, two years of non-obligatory pre-school are provided by the political districts. During the school year, the political district provided pre-school care for a total of 578 children of which 359 children (62.1%) received subsidized pre-school care. The canton's primary school program requires students to attend for four years. There were 2 students in the municipal primary school program. The obligatory lower secondary school program lasts for six years and there were 10 students in those schools.

As of 2000, there were 10 students from Villars-Epeney who attended schools outside the municipality.
