= Yvonand =

- Municipality
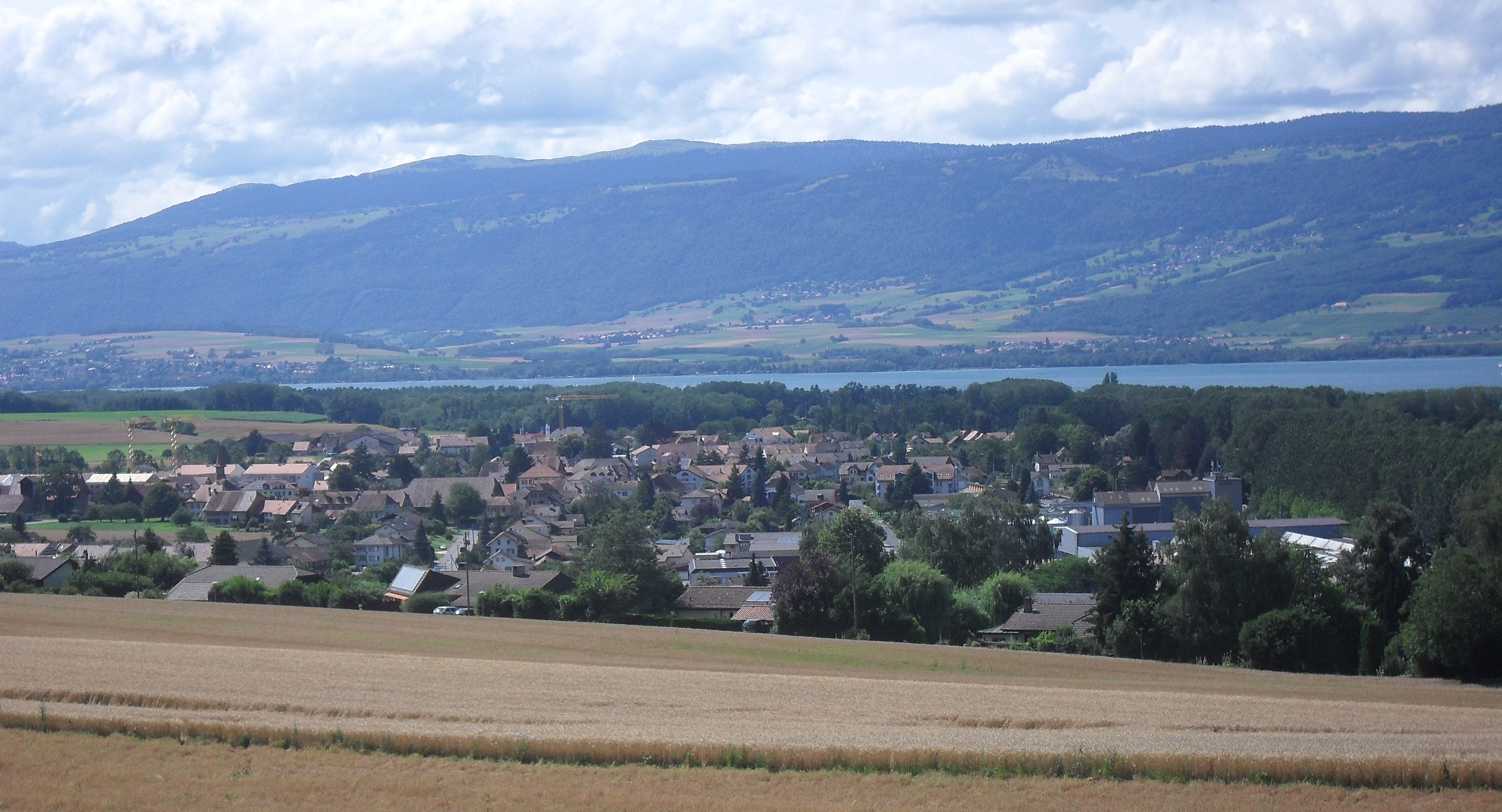

- Flag Coat of arms
- Location of Yvonand
- Location within Switzerland Location within Canton of Vaud
- Coordinates: 46°48′N 6°45′E
- Country: Switzerland
- Canton: Vaud
- District: Jura-Nord Vaudois

Government
  - Mayor: Syndic

Area
  - Total: 13.38 km^{2} (5.17 sq mi)
- Elevation: 438 m (1,437 ft)
- Highest elevation (Roche de la Baume): 658 m (2,159 ft)
- Lowest elevation (Lake Neuchâtel): 430 m (1,410 ft)

Population (2003)
  - Total: 2,317
  - Density: 173.2/km^{2} (448.5/sq mi)
- Time zone: UTC+01:00 (CET)
  - Summer (DST): UTC+02:00 (CEST)
- Postal code: 1462
- SFOS number: 5939
- ISO 3166 code: CH-VD
- Surrounded by: Cheseaux-Noréaz, Cheyres (FR), Concise, Corcelles-près-Concise, Cronay, Cuarny, Donneloye, Molondin, Onnens, Rovray, Villars-Epeney
- Website: www.yvonand.ch

Yvonand is a municipality in the district of Jura-Nord Vaudois (former Yverdon) of the canton of Vaud in Switzerland.

Located on the southwestern shore of Lake Neuchâtel the village has a population of almost 2,500 which may rise to 7,000 in summer, due to the popularity of the sandy beaches, which gently shelve into the lake.

== History ==
Aerial view from 500 m by Walter Mittelholzer (1925)

Yvonand has a long tradition of settlement. Approximately 4,000 years BC, the caves in the Vallon of Vaux were used as first places of settlement. Some cave paintings date from this time. In the Bronze Age, settlements were made of wooden stakes in Yvonand bay.

The area around Yvonand village was settled during the Roman era, on the road between Eburodunum (Yverdon) and Aventicum (Avenches). At Mordagne to the west of the Mentue, the foundation walls of a Roman villa were excavated, which was established around 100 years after Christ. The traces of a settlement, to which a Heiligtum (a Gallo-Roman temple) also belonged, was probably inhabited in the year 400.

Yvonand is first mentioned in 1010 as Evonant. The designations Ivonant (1100) appeared later, de Vonant in the 12th Century, Eyvonant (1437) and Yvonant (1453). The place name derives from the Germanic family name Evo and the word 'nant', which signifies a brook or a valley.

During the Burgundian Wars in 1476, Yvonand came under the administration of Grandson, which was itself under the common rule of Bern and Fribourg; situated at the southern lakeshore it had its own Court of Justice. In 1531 the commune joined the reformation.

After the collapse of the Ancien Régime and during the period of Napoleon's Helvetic Republic, from 1798 to 1803, Yvonand was forced to join the Canton of Léman, which afterwards became Canton Vaud. In 1798, it was assigned to the district of Yverdon.

== Geography ==
Yvonand has an area, as of 2009, of 13.4 square kilometers (5.2 mi^{2}). Of this area, 7 km^{2} (2.7 mi^{2}) or 52.3% is used for agricultural purposes, while 4.27 km^{2} (1.65 mi^{2}) or 31.9% is forested. Of the rest of the land, 1.73 km^{2} (0.67 mi^{2}) or 12.9% is settled (buildings or roads), 0.08 km^{2} (20 acres) or 0.6% is either rivers or lakes and 0.28 km^{2} (0.11 mi^{2}) or 2.1% is unproductive land.

Of the built up area, housing and buildings made up 5.3% and transportation infrastructure made up 5.5%. Out of the forested land, all of the forested land area is covered with heavy forests. Of the agricultural land, 42.0% is used for growing crops and 8.9% is pastures, while 1.4% is used for orchards or vine crops. All the water in the municipality is flowing water.

The municipality was part of the Yverdon District until it was dissolved on 31 August 2006, and Yvonand became part of the new district of Jura-Nord Vaudois.

Yvonand is 438 metres (1,437 ft) above sea level and 8 km (5.0 mi) east northeast of the former district capital Yverdon-les-Bains. The village extends along the mouth of the River Mentue, briefly before its delta into Lake Neuchâtel, in northern French speaking Switzerland. The municipality covers a section of the undulating land between Lake Neuchâtel and the Broye.

The central part of the area features the delta of the River Mentue, which flows into Lake Neuchâtel. The lakeshore in the region of and surrounding Yvonand is flat, near a belt of reeds and forest. In the southeast the land rises to its highest point, in the municipality, at 675 m (2,215 ft) above sea level, bordering a high plateau with Rovray and Arrissoules, achieving the height of La Baume, which then drops dramatically toward Yvonand. The southern part of the municipality covers the valley of the Mentue, up to 1 km (0.62 mi) wide. On the east side of the River Vaux, the stream has created a valley in the course of millions of years by its erosive strength. Between these two valleys is the high forest, Bois de Montessy, and Niédens. The western delimitation runs by sections along the River Epena, which rises behind the Montéla.

Neighbouring municipalities of Yvonand are Cheseaux-Noréaz, Villars-Epeney, Cuarny, Cronay, Donneloye, Molondin and Rovray in Canton Vaud as well as Cheyres in Canton Fribourg.

== Demographics ==
Yvonand has a population (as of December 2020) of 3,470. As of 2008, 11.1% of the population are resident foreign nationals. Over the last 10 years (1999–2009 ) the population has changed at a rate of 13.2%. It has changed at a rate of 15.5% due to migration and at a rate of -2.3% due to births and deaths.

Most of the population (as of 2000) speaks French (2,094 or 91.9%) as their first language, German is the second most common (99 or 4.3%) and Portuguese is the third (26 or 1.1%). There are 18 people who speak Italian and 2 people who speak Romansh.

The age distribution, as of 2009, in Yvonand is; 258 children or 10.5% of the population are between 0 and 9 years old and 392 teenagers or 16.0% are between 10 and 19. Of the adult population, 237 people or 9.7% of the population are between 20 and 29 years old. 297 people or 12.1% are between 30 and 39, 415 people or 16.9% are between 40 and 49, and 310 people or 12.6% are between 50 and 59. The senior population distribution is 269 people or 11.0% of the population are between 60 and 69 years old, 141 people or 5.7% are between 70 and 79, there are 114 people or 4.6% who are between 80 and 89, and there are 22 people or 0.9% who are 90 and older.

As of 2000, there were 915 people who were single and never married in the municipality. There were 1,117 married individuals, 138 widows or widowers and 108 individuals who are divorced.

As of 2000, there were 862 private households in the municipality, and an average of 2.5 persons per household. There were 238 households that consist of only one person and 76 households with five or more people. Out of a total of 883 households that answered this question, 27.0% were households made up of just one person and there were 4 adults who lived with their parents. Of the rest of the households, there are 245 married couples without children, 317 married couples with children There were 51 single parents with a child or children. There were 7 households that were made up of unrelated people and 21 households that were made up of some sort of institution or another collective housing.

In 2000, there were 440 single family homes (or 68.8% of the total) out of a total of 640 inhabited buildings. There were 84 multi-family buildings (13.1%), along with 86 multi-purpose buildings that were mostly used for housing (13.4%) and 30 other use buildings (commercial or industrial) that also had some housing (4.7%).

In 2000, a total of 839 apartments (85.9% of the total) were permanently occupied, while 106 apartments (10.8%) were seasonally occupied and 32 apartments (3.3%) were empty. As of 2009, the construction rate of new housing units was 1.2 new units per 1000 residents. The vacancy rate for the municipality, in 2010, was 0.09%.

The historical population is given in the following chart:

== Politics ==
In the 2007 federal election the most popular party was the SP which received 28.71% of the vote. The next three most popular parties were the SVP (27.51%), the FDP (17.04%) and the Green Party (9.01%). In the federal election, a total of 713 votes were cast, and the voter turnout was 44.1%.

== Economy ==
As of 2010, Yvonand had an unemployment rate of 3.1%. As of 2008, there were 44 people employed in the primary economic sector and about 17 businesses involved in this sector. 234 people were employed in the secondary sector and there were 33 businesses in this sector. 464 people were employed in the tertiary sector, with 58 businesses in this sector. There were 1,054 residents of the municipality who were employed in some capacity, of which females made up 41.1% of the workforce.

In 2008, the total number of full-time equivalent jobs was 620. The number of jobs in the primary sector was 30, of which 28 were in agriculture and 2 were in fishing or fisheries. The number of jobs in the secondary sector was 220 of which 160 or (72.7%) were in manufacturing and 60 (27.3%) were in construction. The number of jobs in the tertiary sector was 370. In the tertiary sector; 107 or 28.9% were in wholesale or retail sales or the repair of motor vehicles, 14 or 3.8% were in the movement and storage of goods, 32 or 8.6% were in a hotel or restaurant, 2 or 0.5% were in the information industry, 3 or 0.8% were the insurance or financial industry, 8 or 2.2% were technical professionals or scientists, 37 or 10.0% were in education and 130 or 35.1% were in health care.

In 2000, there were 484 workers who commuted into the municipality and 653 workers who commuted away. The municipality is a net exporter of workers, with about 1.3 workers leaving the municipality for every one entering. Of the working population, 11.7% used public transportation to get to work, and 63.9% used a private car.

== Transport ==
The municipality is well served thanks to the main road from Yverdon to Estavayer-le-Lac, which traverses the commune and which serves as the High Street to the village. Since 2001, through traffic has bypassed the village thanks to the completion of the Yverdon-les-Bains–Payerne section of the A1 motorway (Lausanne–Bern). This motorway runs across the heights to the south of Yvonand, where the deep valleys of the Mentue and the Vaux had to be spanned, with two impressive viaducts over 100m high (Pont sur la Mentue and Viaduc du Vaux). The nearest motorway junctions are Yverdon Ouest (10 km to the west) and Estavayer-le-Lac (14 km to the east).

On 1 February 1877 the Yverdon railway line was extended to Payerne with a station in Yvonand. There is a Post Bus, which serves the municipalities of the hinterland in a circular route.

The recent extension of the A1 motorway, which traverses the municipality has improved communication links, making it more attractive to commuters, who work further afield, but who enjoy the sheltered lakeside location.

== Religion ==
From the 2000 census, 507 or 22.3% were Roman Catholic, while 1,270 or 55.8% belonged to the Swiss Reformed Church. Of the rest of the population, there were 7 members of an Orthodox church (or about 0.31% of the population), there were 3 individuals (or about 0.13% of the population) who belonged to the Christian Catholic Church, and there were 72 individuals (or about 3.16% of the population) who belonged to another Christian church. There were 2 individuals (or about 0.09% of the population) who were Jewish, and 17 (or about 0.75% of the population) who were Islamic. There were 5 individuals who were Buddhist, 3 individuals who were Hindu and 1 individual who belonged to another church. 313 (or about 13.74% of the population) belonged to no church, are agnostic or atheist, and 113 individuals (or about 4.96% of the population) did not answer the question.

== Education ==
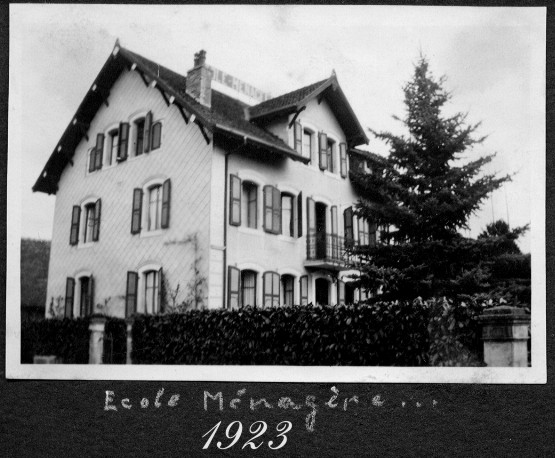
Ecole Ménagère in 1923

In Yvonand about 853 or (37.4%) of the population have completed non-mandatory upper secondary education, and 224 or (9.8%) have completed additional higher education (either university or a Fachhochschule). Of the 224 who completed tertiary schooling, 63.8% were Swiss men, 24.1% were Swiss women, 8.9% were non-Swiss men and 3.1% were non-Swiss women.

In the 2009/2010 school year there were a total of 375 students in the Yvonand school district. In the Vaud cantonal school system, two years of non-obligatory pre-school are provided by the political districts. During the school year, the political district provided pre-school care for a total of 578 children of which 359 children (62.1%) received subsidized pre-school care. The canton's primary school program requires students to attend for four years. There were 176 students in the municipal primary school program. The obligatory lower secondary school program lasts for six years and there were 197 students in those schools. There were also 2 students who were home schooled or attended another non-traditional school.

As of 2000, there were 68 students in Yvonand who came from another municipality, while 102 residents attended schools outside the municipality.

== Sites of Interest ==
A church, belonging to the diocese of the Bishop of Lausanne, has existed in the village since its first denomination as Yvonand; the reformed parish church was built again in 1749 and received a new tower in 1906, which was upgraded in 2006. The Catholic chapel dates from 1959.

The prehistoric settlement at Le Marais is part of the Prehistoric Pile dwellings around the Alps a UNESCO World Heritage Site.

== Local Societies ==
- Yvonand Youth Club: www.jeunesse-yvonand.net
- Parti socialiste d'Yvonand (socialist party - political) : www.ps-yvonand.ch
