= Yverdon District =

Coordinates: 46°47′N 6°38′E

Yverdon District District d'Yverdon
- District
- Flag Coat of arms

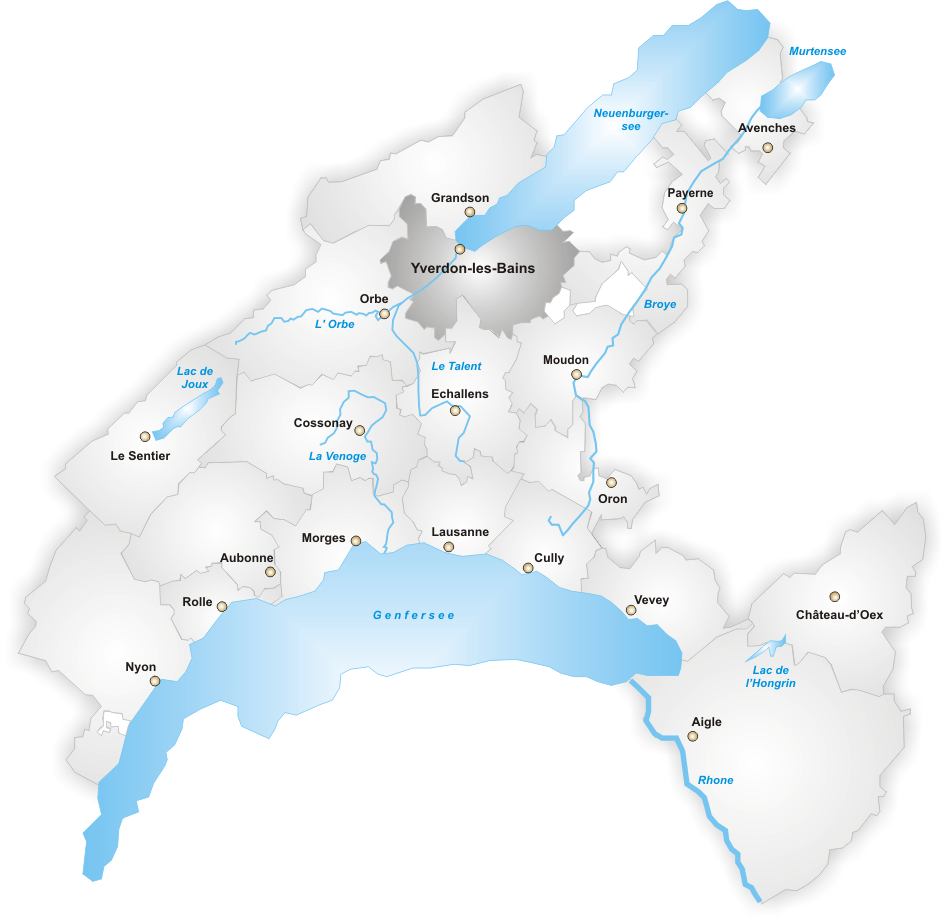
- Country: Switzerland
- Canton: Vaud
- Capital: Yverdon

Area
  - Total: 156.68 km^{2} (60.49 sq mi)

Population (2006)
  - Total: 36,335
  - Density: 231.91/km^{2} (600.63/sq mi)
- Time zone: UTC+1 (CET)
  - Summer (DST): UTC+2 (CEST)
- Municipalities: 38

Yverdon District was a district of the canton of Vaud in Switzerland until 2006 when it was dissolved. It was divided into the Cercles of Molondin, Belmont-sur-Yverdon, Yverdon and Champvent.

The district consisted of 38 municipalities, is 156.68 km^{2} in area and was home to 34,929 inhabitants at the end of 2003.

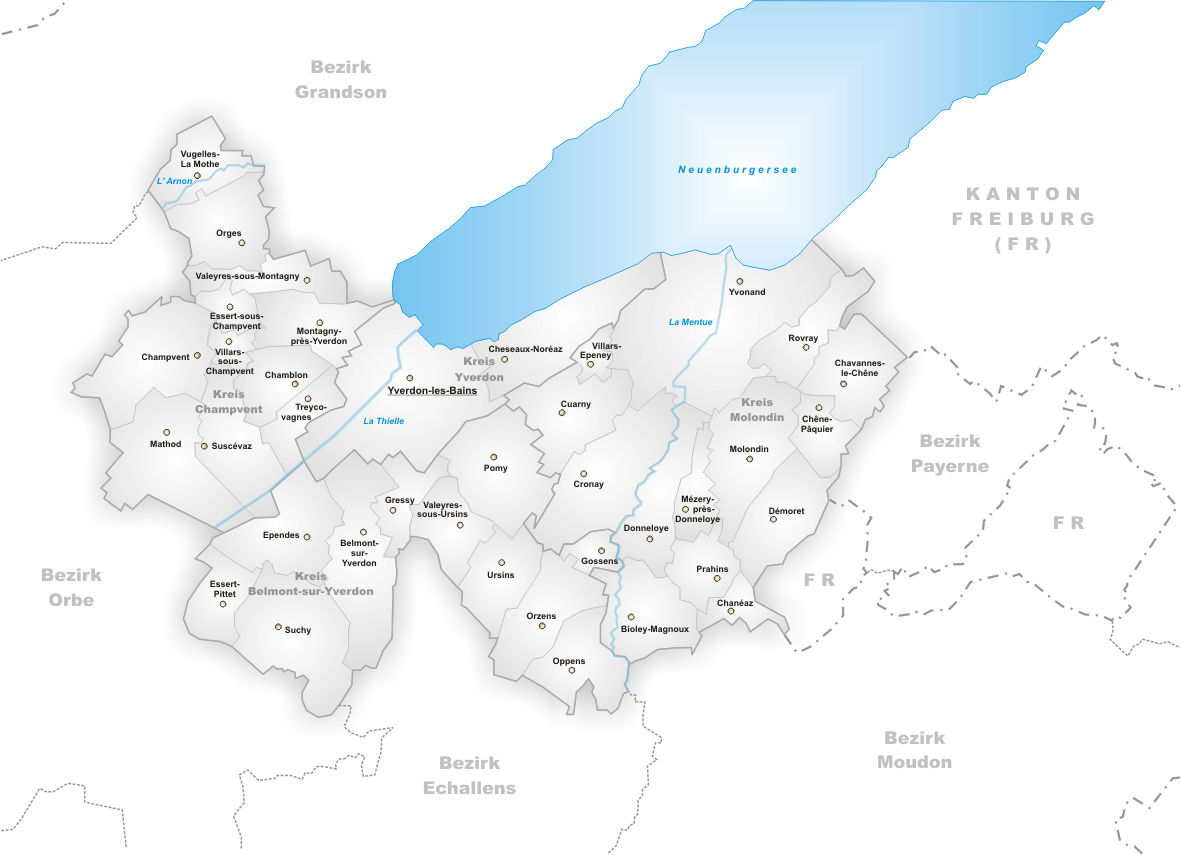
Municipalities of District Yverdon

== Mergers and name changes ==
- On 1 January 2005 the former municipality of Arrissoules merged into the municipality of Rovray.
- On 1 September 2006 the municipalities of Belmont-sur-Yverdon, Bioley-Magnoux, Chamblon, Champvent, Chanéaz, Chavannes-le-Chêne, Chêne-Pâquier, Cheseaux-Noréaz, Cronay, Cuarny, Démoret, Donneloye, Épendes (VD), Essert-Pittet, Essert-sous-Champvent, Gossens, Gressy, Mathod, Mézery-près-Donneloye, Molondin, Montagny-près-Yverdon, Orges, Orzens, Pomy, Prahins, Rovray, Suchy, Suscévaz, Treycovagnes, Ursins, Valeyres-sous-Montagny, Valeyres-sous-Ursins, Villars-Epeney, Villars-sous-Champvent, Vugelles-La Mothe, Yverdon-les-Bains, and Yvonand came from the District d'Yverdon to join the Jura-Nord vaudois District
- On 1 September 2006 the municipality of Oppens came from the District d'Yverdon to join the Gros-de-Vaud District.

== Yverdon ==
=== Cercle of Belmont-sur-Yverdon ===
Municipality	Population (31.12.2003)	Area (km^{2})
Belmont-sur-Yverdon	264	6.47
Épendes	315	4.82
Essert-Pittet	124	2.76
Gossens	128	1.02
Gressy	164	2.23
Oppens	170	3.60
Orzens	207	4.19
Pomy	551	5.62
Suchy	346	6.66
Ursins	179	3.37
Valeyres-sous-Ursins	198	2.83

=== Cercle of Champvent ===
Municipality	Population (31.12.2003)	Area (km^{2})
Chamblon	557	2.85
Champvent	316	6.88
Essert-sous-Champvent	127	1.23
Mathod	486	6.59
Montagny-près-Yverdon	609	3.55
Orges	223	4.01
Suscévaz	175	4.15
Treycovagnes	478	2.07
Valeyres-sous-Montagny	572	2.27
Villars-sous-Champvent	49	0.92
Vugelles-La Mothe	106	3.08

=== Cercle of Molondin ===
Municipality	Population (31.12.2003)	Area (km^{2})
Bioley-Magnoux	163	4.27
Chanéaz	99	1.39
Chavannes-le-Chêne	236	3.98
Chêne-Pâquier	105	2.11
Cronay	316	6.61
Cuarny	179	4.56
Démoret	135	4.24
Donneloye	324	3.72
Mézery-près-Donneloye	75	1.85
Molondin	196	5.53
Prahins	142	2.42
Rovray	129	3.21
Villars-Epeney	64	0.86
Yvonand	2,317	13.38

=== Cercle of Yverdon ===
Municipality	Population (31.12.2003)	Area (km^{2})
Cheseaux-Noréaz	510	6.12
Yverdon-les-Bains	23,595	11.26
