= Ursins =

- Municipality
- Flag Coat of arms
- Location of Ursins
- Location within Switzerland Location within Canton of Vaud
- Coordinates: 46°44′N 6°40′E
- Country: Switzerland
- Canton: Vaud
- District: Jura-Nord Vaudois

Government
  - Mayor: Syndic

Area
  - Total: 3.37 km^{2} (1.30 sq mi)
- Elevation: 645 m (2,116 ft)

Population (2003)
  - Total: 179
  - Density: 53.1/km^{2} (138/sq mi)
- Time zone: UTC+01:00 (CET)
  - Summer (DST): UTC+02:00 (CEST)
- Postal code: 1412
- SFOS number: 5932
- ISO 3166 code: CH-VD
- Surrounded by: Cronay, Essertines-sur-Yverdon, Orzens, Pomy, Valeyres-sous-Ursins
- Website: www.ursins.ch

Ursins (French pronunciation: [yʁsɛ̃]) is a municipality in the district of Jura-Nord Vaudois of the canton of Vaud in Switzerland.

== History ==
Ursins is first mentioned in 1174 as Ursi.

== Geography ==
Ursins has an area, as of 2009, of 3.4 square kilometers (1.3 mi^{2}). Of this area, 2.58 km^{2} (1.00 mi^{2}) or 77.0% is used for agricultural purposes, while 0.7 km^{2} (0.27 mi^{2}) or 20.9% is forested. Of the rest of the land, 0.12 km^{2} (30 acres) or 3.6% is settled (buildings or roads).

Of the built up area, housing and buildings made up 1.5% and transportation infrastructure made up 2.1%. Out of the forested land, 19.7% of the total land area is heavily forested and 1.2% is covered with orchards or small clusters of trees. Of the agricultural land, 69.3% is used for growing crops and 6.0% is pastures, while 1.8% is used for orchards or vine crops.

The municipality was part of the Yverdon District until it was dissolved on 31 August 2006, and Ursins became part of the new district of Jura-Nord Vaudois.

The municipalities of Cronay, Cuarny, Pomy, Ursins, Valeyres-sous-Ursins and Villars-Epeney are considering a merger at a date in the future into the new municipality with an, as of 2011, undetermined name.

== Coat of arms ==
The blazon of the municipal coat of arms is Pally of Six Argent and Azure, on a Bend Gules three Bears' heads bendwise Or. This may be an example of canting with the bear or Ursus on the coat of arms."

== Demographics ==
Ursins has a population (as of December 2020) of 239. As of 2008, 4.6% of the population are resident foreign nationals. Over the last 10 years (1999–2009 ) the population has changed at a rate of 18.9%. It has changed at a rate of 19.4% due to migration and at a rate of -0.6% due to births and deaths.

Most of the population (as of 2000) speaks French (164 or 96.5%) as their first language, with German being second most common (2 or 1.2%) and Afrikanische Sprachen being third (2 or 1.2%).

The age distribution, as of 2009, in Ursins is; 24 children or 11.5% of the population are between 0 and 9 years old and 20 teenagers or 9.6% are between 10 and 19. Of the adult population, 27 people or 13.0% of the population are between 20 and 29 years old. 36 people or 17.3% are between 30 and 39, 28 people or 13.5% are between 40 and 49, and 24 people or 11.5% are between 50 and 59. The senior population distribution is 24 people or 11.5% of the population are between 60 and 69 years old, 14 people or 6.7% are between 70 and 79, there are 10 people or 4.8% who are between 80 and 89, and there is 1 person who is 90 and older.

As of 2000, there were 65 people who were single and never married in the municipality. There were 92 married individuals, 9 widows or widowers and 4 individuals who are divorced.

As of 2000, there were 66 private households in the municipality, and an average of 2.5 persons per household. There were 14 households that consist of only one person and 4 households with five or more people. Out of a total of 67 households that answered this question, 20.9% were households made up of just one person and there was 1 adult who lived with their parents. Of the rest of the households, there are 20 married couples without children, 27 married couples with children There were 3 single parents with a child or children. There was 1 household that was made up of unrelated people and 1 household that was made up of some sort of institution or another collective housing.

In 2000 there were 20 single family homes (or 41.7% of the total) out of a total of 48 inhabited buildings. There were 5 multi-family buildings (10.4%) and along with 23 multi-purpose buildings that were mostly used for housing (47.9%).

In 2000, a total of 63 apartments (87.5% of the total) were permanently occupied, while 6 apartments (8.3%) were seasonally occupied and 3 apartments (4.2%) were empty. As of 2009, the construction rate of new housing units was 0 new units per 1000 residents. The vacancy rate for the municipality, in 2010, was 0%.

The historical population is given in the following chart:

== Heritage sites of national significance ==
The Roman era Sanctuary is listed as a Swiss heritage site of national significance.

== Politics ==
In the 2007 federal election the most popular party was the SVP which received 50.29% of the vote. The next three most popular parties were the FDP (17.46%), the Green Party (11.26%) and the SP (10.32%). In the federal election, a total of 79 votes were cast, and the voter turnout was 56.4%.

== Economy ==
As of 2010, Ursins had an unemployment rate of 1.4%. As of 2008, there were 22 people employed in the primary economic sector and about 10 businesses involved in this sector. 7 people were employed in the secondary sector and there was 1 business in this sector. 1 person was employed in the tertiary sector, with 1 business in this sector. There were 87 residents of the municipality who were employed in some capacity, of which females made up 42.5% of the workforce.

In 2008 the total number of full-time equivalent jobs was 19. The number of jobs in the primary sector was 11, all of which were in agriculture. The number of jobs in the secondary sector was 7, all of which were in construction. The number of jobs in the tertiary sector was 1, a technical professional or scientist.

In 2000, there were 4 workers who commuted into the municipality and 65 workers who commuted away. The municipality is a net exporter of workers, with about 16.3 workers leaving the municipality for every one entering. Of the working population, 6.9% used public transportation to get to work, and 66.7% used a private car.

== Religion ==
From the 2000 census, 9 or 5.3% were Roman Catholic, while 134 or 78.8% belonged to the Swiss Reformed Church. Of the rest of the population, there were 2 members of an Orthodox church (or about 1.18% of the population). 20 (or about 11.76% of the population) belonged to no church, are agnostic or atheist, and 5 individuals (or about 2.94% of the population) did not answer the question.

== Education ==
In Ursins about 61 or (35.9%) of the population have completed non-mandatory upper secondary education, and 22 or (12.9%) have completed additional higher education (either university or a Fachhochschule). Of the 22 who completed tertiary schooling, 54.5% were Swiss men, 27.3% were Swiss women.

In the 2009/2010 school year there were a total of 23 students in the Ursins school district. In the Vaud cantonal school system, two years of non-obligatory pre-school are provided by the political districts. During the school year, the political district provided pre-school care for a total of 578 children of which 359 children (62.1%) received subsidized pre-school care. The canton's primary school program requires students to attend for four years. There were 13 students in the municipal primary school program. The obligatory lower secondary school program lasts for six years and there were 10 students in those schools.

As of 2000, there were 29 students from Ursins who attended schools outside the municipality.
