= Rovray =

- Municipality
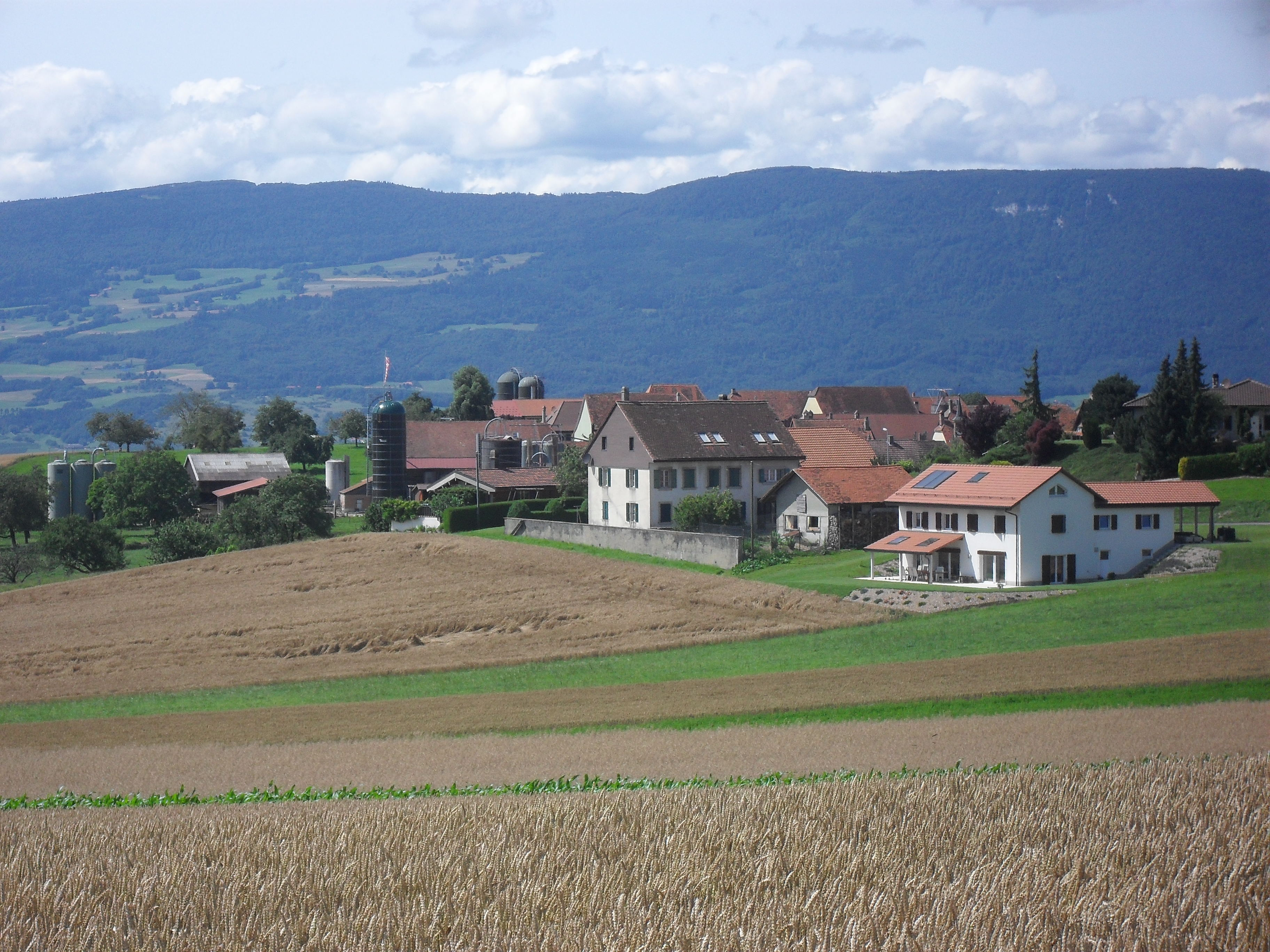

- Flag Coat of arms
- Location of Rovray
- Location within Switzerland Location within Canton of Vaud
- Coordinates: 46°47′N 6°46′E
- Country: Switzerland
- Canton: Vaud
- District: Jura-Nord Vaudois

Government
  - Mayor: Syndic

Area
  - Total: 3.21 km^{2} (1.24 sq mi)
- Elevation: 650 m (2,130 ft)

Population (2003)
  - Total: 129
  - Density: 40.2/km^{2} (104/sq mi)
- Time zone: UTC+01:00 (CET)
  - Summer (DST): UTC+02:00 (CEST)
- Postal code: 1463
- SFOS number: 5928
- ISO 3166 code: CH-VD
- Surrounded by: Chavannes-le-Chêne, Cheyres (FR), Molondin, Yvonand
- Website: http://www.rovray.ch

Rovray is a municipality in the district of Jura-Nord Vaudois in the canton of Vaud in Switzerland.

== History ==
Rovray is first mentioned around 1403–1409 as Roueraye. Arrissoules is first mentioned in 1148 as Arresules. On 1 January 2005 the former municipality of Arrissoules merged into the municipality of Rovray, which kept the name Rovray.

== Geography ==
Rovray has an area, as of 2009, of 3.2 square kilometers (1.2 mi^{2}). Of this area, 2.37 km^{2} (0.92 mi^{2}) or 74.1% is used for agricultural purposes, while 0.61 km^{2} (0.24 mi^{2}) or 19.1% is forested. Of the rest of the land, 0.21 km^{2} (0.081 mi^{2}) or 6.6% is settled (buildings or roads).

Of the built up area, housing and buildings made up 3.1% and transportation infrastructure made up 3.1%. Out of the forested land, all of the forested land area is covered with heavy forests. Of the agricultural land, 55.9% is used for growing crops and 16.6% is pastures, while 1.6% is used for orchards or vine crops.

The municipality was part of the Yverdon District until it was dissolved on 31 August 2006, and Rovray became part of the new district of Jura-Nord Vaudois.

The municipality is located above the shore of Lake Neuchatel. It consists of the villages of Rovray and Arrissoules.

== Coat of arms ==
The municipal coat of arms was created on 1 January 2005 when Rovray and Arrissoules merged. It includes the Azure semee of Acorns Argent, a Buck salient Or from Rovray and the Paly of six Azure and Or, a linden tree proper overall from Arrissoules. The tunnel represents the Arrissoules motorway tunnel.

== Demographics ==
Rovray has a population (as of December 2020) of 202. As of 2008, 5.2% of the population are resident foreign nationals. Over the last 10 years (1999–2009 ) the population has changed at a rate of 5.4%. It has changed at a rate of 10.1% due to migration and at a rate of -5.4% due to births and deaths.

Most of the population (as of 2000) speaks French (86 or 98.9%) as their first language with the rest speaking English

The age distribution, as of 2009, in Rovray is; 13 children or 9.6% of the population are between 0 and 9 years old and 18 teenagers or 13.2% are between 10 and 19. Of the adult population, 15 people or 11.0% of the population are between 20 and 29 years old. 19 people or 14.0% are between 30 and 39, 22 people or 16.2% are between 40 and 49, and 17 people or 12.5% are between 50 and 59. The senior population distribution is 16 people or 11.8% of the population are between 60 and 69 years old, 6 people or 4.4% are between 70 and 79, there are 8 people or 5.9% who are between 80 and 89, and there are 2 people or 1.5% who are 90 and older.

As of 2000, there were 34 people who were single and never married in the municipality. There were 45 married individuals, 1 widows or widowers and 7 individuals who are divorced.

As of 2000, there were 51 private households in the municipality, and an average of 2.4 persons per household. There were 8 households that consist of only one person and 2 households with five or more people. Out of a total of 36 households that answered this question, 22.2% were households made up of just one person and there was 1 adult who lived with their parents. Of the rest of the households, there are 14 married couples without children, 12 married couples with children

In 2000 there were 9 single family homes (or 30.0% of the total) out of a total of 30 inhabited buildings. There were 2 multi-family buildings (6.7%), along with 16 multi-purpose buildings that were mostly used for housing (53.3%) and 3 other use buildings (commercial or industrial) that also had some housing (10.0%).

In 2000, a total of 35 apartments (85.4% of the total) were permanently occupied, while 5 apartments (12.2%) were seasonally occupied and one apartment was empty. As of 2009, the construction rate of new housing units was 0 new units per 1000 residents. The vacancy rate for the municipality, in 2010, was 0%.

The historical population is given in the following chart:

== Politics ==
In the 2007 federal election the most popular party was the SVP which received 45.24% of the vote. The next three most popular parties were the FDP (21.85%), the SP (11.84%) and the Green Party (7.7%). In the federal election, a total of 60 votes were cast, and the voter turnout was 64.5%.

== Economy ==
As of 2010, Rovray had an unemployment rate of 1.2%. As of 2008, there were 30 people employed in the primary economic sector and about 11 businesses involved in this sector. No one was employed in the secondary sector or the tertiary sector. There were 50 residents of the municipality who were employed in some capacity, of which females made up 46.0% of the workforce.

In 2008 the total number of full-time equivalent jobs was 22. The number of jobs in the primary sector was 22, all of which were in agriculture. There were no jobs in the secondary or tertiary sectors.

In 2000, there were 31 workers who commuted away from the municipality. Of the working population, 4.3% used public transportation to get to work, and 61.4% used a private car.

== Religion ==
From the 2000 census, 6 or 6.9% were Roman Catholic, while 72 or 82.8% belonged to the Swiss Reformed Church. Of the rest of the population, there were 6 individuals (or about 6.90% of the population) who belonged to another Christian church. 4 (or about 4.60% of the population) belonged to no church, are agnostic or atheist, and 2 individuals (or about 2.30% of the population) did not answer the question.

== Education ==
In Rovray about 36 or (41.4%) of the population have completed non-mandatory upper secondary education, and 14 or (16.1%) have completed additional higher education (either university or a Fachhochschule). Of the 14 who completed tertiary schooling, 42.9% were Swiss men, 42.9% were Swiss women.

In the 2009/2010 school year there were a total of 13 students in the Rovray school district. In the Vaud cantonal school system, two years of non-obligatory pre-school are provided by the political districts. During the school year, the political district provided pre-school care for a total of 578 children of which 359 children (62.1%) received subsidized pre-school care. The canton's primary school program requires students to attend for four years. There were 6 students in the municipal primary school program. The obligatory lower secondary school program lasts for six years and there were 7 students in those schools.

As of 2000, there were 16 students from Rovray who attended schools outside the municipality.
