= Cronay =

- Municipality
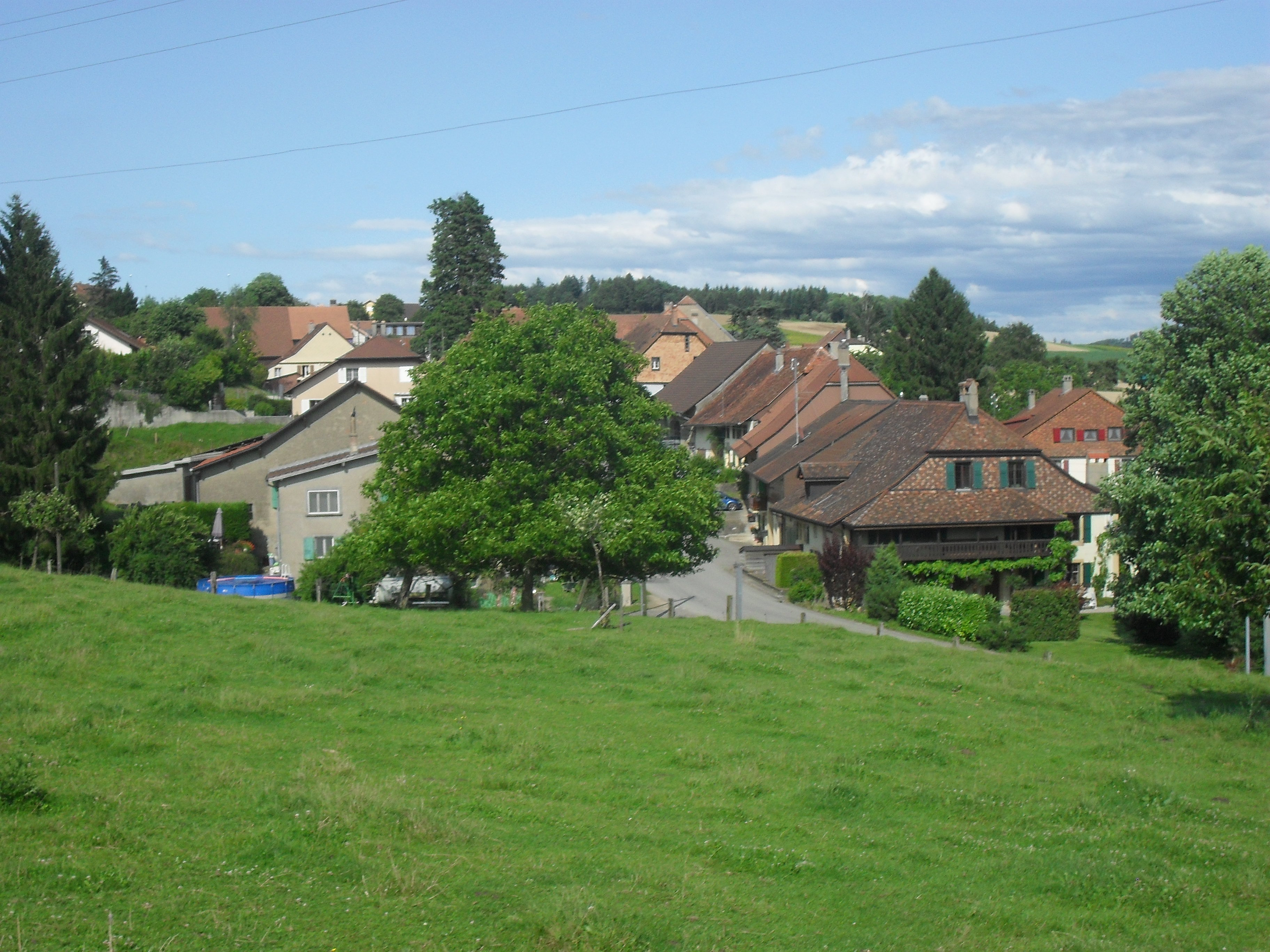

- Flag Coat of arms
- Location of Cronay
- Location within Switzerland Location within Canton of Vaud
- Coordinates: 46°45′N 6°42′E
- Country: Switzerland
- Canton: Vaud
- District: Jura-Nord Vaudois

Government
  - Mayor: Syndic

Area
  - Total: 6.61 km^{2} (2.55 sq mi)
- Elevation: 626 m (2,054 ft)

Population (2003)
  - Total: 316
  - Density: 47.8/km^{2} (124/sq mi)
- Time zone: UTC+01:00 (CET)
  - Summer (DST): UTC+02:00 (CEST)
- Postal code: 1406
- SFOS number: 5910
- ISO 3166 code: CH-VD
- Surrounded by: Cuarny, Donneloye, Gossens, Orzens, Pomy, Ursins, Yvonand
- Website: www.cronay.ch

Cronay is a municipality in the district of Jura-Nord Vaudois of the canton of Vaud in Switzerland.

== History ==
Cronay is first mentioned in 1142 as Crosnai.

== Geography ==
Cronay has an area, as of 2009, of 6.6 square kilometers (2.5 mi^{2}). Of this area, 4.02 km^{2} (1.55 mi^{2}) or 61.0% is used for agricultural purposes, while 2.15 km^{2} (0.83 mi^{2}) or 32.6% is forested. Of the rest of the land, 0.38 km^{2} (0.15 mi^{2}) or 5.8% is settled (buildings or roads), 0.03 km^{2} (7.4 acres) or 0.5% is either rivers or lakes and 0.01 km^{2} (2.5 acres) or 0.2% is unproductive land.

Of the built up area, housing and buildings made up 2.3% and transportation infrastructure made up 3.0%. Out of the forested land, 31.6% of the total land area is heavily forested and 1.1% is covered with orchards or small clusters of trees. Of the agricultural land, 53.4% is used for growing crops and 6.2% is pastures, while 1.4% is used for orchards or vine crops. All the water in the municipality is flowing water.

The municipality was part of the Yverdon District until it was dissolved on 31 August 2006, and Cronay became part of the new district of Jura-Nord Vaudois.

It consists of the village of Cronay and the hamlets of La Baumaz, La Crausaz and Planchamps.

The municipalities of Cronay, Cuarny, Pomy, Ursins, Valeyres-sous-Ursins and Villars-Epeney are considering a merger on at a date in the future into the new municipality with an, as of 2011, undetermined name.

== Coat of arms ==
The blazon of the municipal coat of arms is Argent, a Saltire engrailed Azure, four Torteaux.

== Demographics ==
Cronay has a population (as of December 2020) of 396. As of 2008, 6.8% of the population are resident foreign nationals. Over the last 10 years (1999–2009) the population has changed at a rate of -0.3%. It has changed at a rate of 1.9% due to migration and at a rate of -2.3% due to births and deaths.

Most of the population (as of 2000) speaks French (299 or 97.1%) as their first language, with German being second most common (4 or 1.3%) and Italian being third (2 or 0.6%).

The age distribution, as of 2009, in Cronay is; 20 children or 6.5% of the population are between 0 and 9 years old and 41 teenagers or 13.4% are between 10 and 19. Of the adult population, 39 people or 12.7% of the population are between 20 and 29 years old. 33 people or 10.7% are between 30 and 39, 52 people or 16.9% are between 40 and 49, and 48 people or 15.6% are between 50 and 59. The senior population distribution is 36 people or 11.7% of the population are between 60 and 69 years old, 15 people or 4.9% are between 70 and 79, there are 22 people or 7.2% who are between 80 and 89, and there is 1 person who is 90 and older.

As of 2000, there were 119 people who were single and never married in the municipality. There were 172 married individuals, 11 widows or widowers and 6 individuals who are divorced.

As of 2000, there were 120 private households in the municipality, and an average of 2.6 persons per household. There were 27 households that consist of only one person and 8 households with five or more people. Out of a total of 121 households that answered this question, 22.3% were households made up of just one person. Of the rest of the households, there are 41 married couples without children, 46 married couples with children There were 5 single parents with a child or children. There was 1 household that was made up of unrelated people and 1 household that was made up of some sort of institution or another collective housing.

In 2000 there were 48 single family homes (or 48.0% of the total) out of a total of 100 inhabited buildings. There were 14 multi-family buildings (14.0%), along with 32 multi-purpose buildings that were mostly used for housing (32.0%) and 6 other use buildings (commercial or industrial) that also had some housing (6.0%).

In 2000, a total of 115 apartments (84.6% of the total) were permanently occupied, while 17 apartments (12.5%) were seasonally occupied and 4 apartments (2.9%) were empty. As of 2009, the construction rate of new housing units was 3.3 new units per 1000 residents. The vacancy rate for the municipality, in 2010, was 0%.

The historical population is given in the following chart:

== Sights ==
The entire village of Cronay is designated as part of the Inventory of Swiss Heritage Sites.

== Politics ==
In the 2007 federal election the most popular party was the SVP which received 40.92% of the vote. The next three most popular parties were the SP (17.9%), the FDP (15.07%) and the Green Party (12.01%). In the federal election, a total of 133 votes were cast, and the voter turnout was 56.6%.

== Economy ==
As of 2010, Cronay had an unemployment rate of 3.2%. As of 2008, there were 53 people employed in the primary economic sector and about 21 businesses involved in this sector. 4 people were employed in the secondary sector and there were 2 businesses in this sector. 9 people were employed in the tertiary sector, with 4 businesses in this sector. There were 149 residents of the municipality who were employed in some capacity, of which females made up 40.3% of the workforce.

In 2008 the total number of full-time equivalent jobs was 43. The number of jobs in the primary sector was 35, of which 27 were in agriculture and 8 were in forestry or lumber production. The number of jobs in the secondary sector was 4, all of which were in construction. The number of jobs in the tertiary sector was 4. In the tertiary sector; 1 was in the sale or repair of motor vehicles, 3 or 75.0% were in education.

In 2000, there were 18 workers who commuted into the municipality and 113 workers who commuted away. The municipality is a net exporter of workers, with about 6.3 workers leaving the municipality for every one entering. Of the working population, 9.4% used public transportation to get to work, and 66.4% used a private car.

== Religion ==
From the 2000 census, 35 or 11.4% were Roman Catholic, while 202 or 65.6% belonged to the Swiss Reformed Church. Of the rest of the population, there was 1 member of an Orthodox church, and there were 18 individuals (or about 5.84% of the population) who belonged to another Christian church. There were 2 individuals who were Hindu. 51 (or about 16.56% of the population) belonged to no church, are agnostic or atheist, and 7 individuals (or about 2.27% of the population) did not answer the question.

== Education ==
In Cronay about 110 or (35.7%) of the population have completed non-mandatory upper secondary education, and 22 or (7.1%) have completed additional higher education (either university or a Fachhochschule). Of the 22 who completed tertiary schooling, 54.5% were Swiss men, 27.3% were Swiss women.

In the 2009/2010 school year there were a total of 27 students in the Cronay school district. In the Vaud cantonal school system, two years of non-obligatory pre-school are provided by the political districts. During the school year, the political district provided pre-school care for a total of 578 children of which 359 children (62.1%) received subsidized pre-school care. The canton's primary school program requires students to attend for four years. There were 16 students in the municipal primary school program. The obligatory lower secondary school program lasts for six years and there were 10 students in those schools. There was also 1 student who was home schooled or attended another non-traditional school.

As of 2000, there were 18 students in Cronay who came from another municipality, while 34 residents attended schools outside the municipality.
