= Pomy, Switzerland =

Pomy
- Municipality
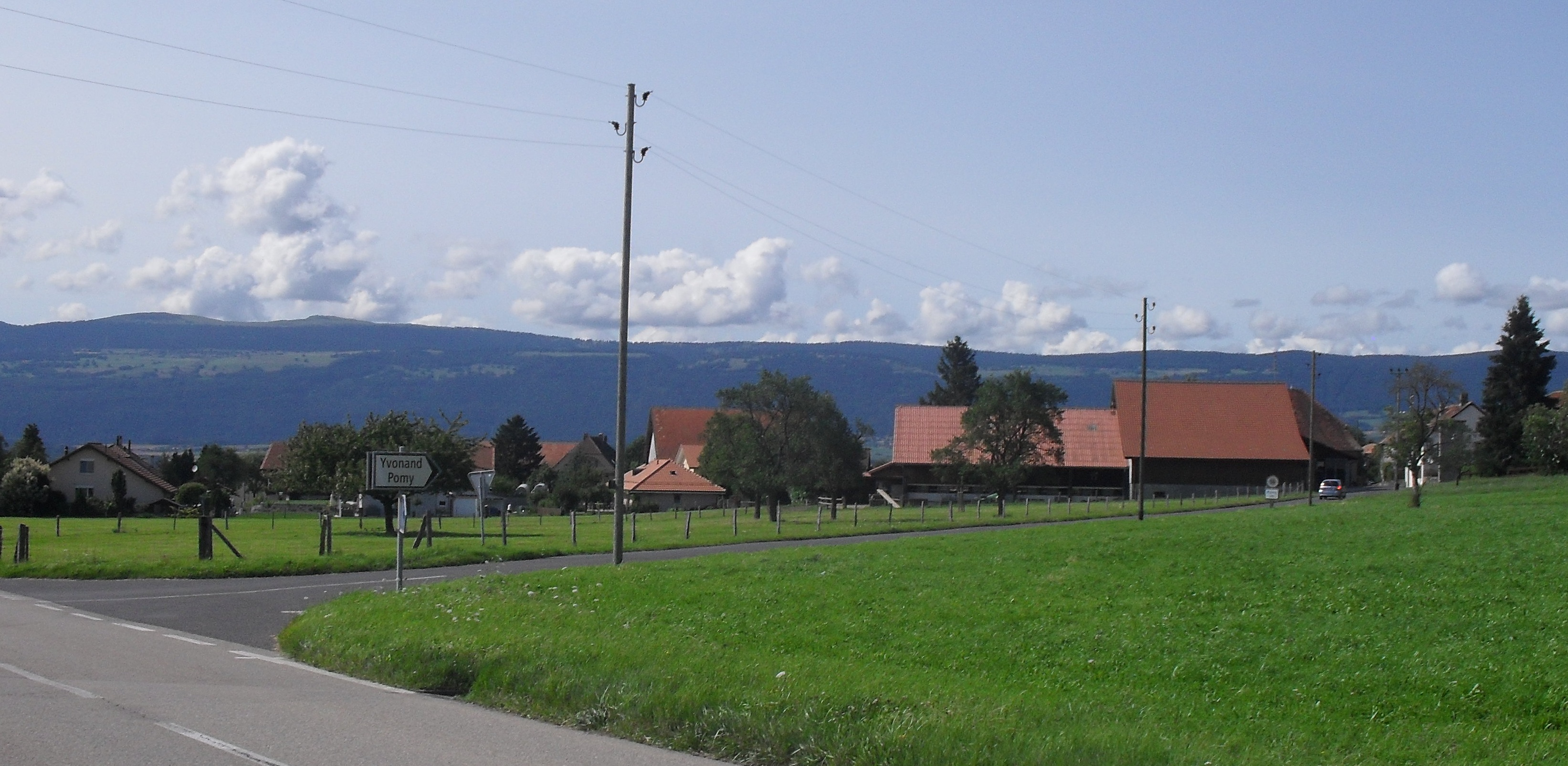

- Flag Coat of arms
- Location of Pomy
- Location within Switzerland Location within Canton of Vaud
- Coordinates: 46°46′N 6°40′E
- Country: Switzerland
- Canton: Vaud
- District: Jura-Nord Vaudois

Government
  - Mayor: Syndic

Area
  - Total: 5.62 km^{2} (2.17 sq mi)
- Elevation: 558 m (1,831 ft)

Population (2003)
  - Total: 551
  - Density: 98.0/km^{2} (254/sq mi)
- Time zone: UTC+01:00 (CET)
  - Summer (DST): UTC+02:00 (CEST)
- Postal code: 1405
- SFOS number: 5926
- ISO 3166 code: CH-VD
- Surrounded by: Cronay, Cuarny, Gressy, Ursins, Valeyres-sous-Ursins, Yverdon-les-Bains
- Website: www.pomy.ch

Pomy (French pronunciation: [pɔmi]) is a municipality in the district of Jura-Nord Vaudois of the canton of Vaud in Switzerland.

== History ==
Pomy is first mentioned in 1184 as Pomiers.

== Geography ==
Pomy has an area, as of 2009, of 5.6 square kilometers (2.2 mi^{2}). Of this area, 4.35 km^{2} (1.68 mi^{2}) or 77.4% is used for agricultural purposes, while 0.9 km^{2} (0.35 mi^{2}) or 16.0% is forested. Of the rest of the land, 0.34 km^{2} (0.13 mi^{2}) or 6.0% is settled (buildings or roads).

Of the built up area, housing and buildings made up 2.3% and transportation infrastructure made up 2.7%. Out of the forested land, all of the forested land area is covered with heavy forests. Of the agricultural land, 66.4% is used for growing crops and 8.4% is pastures, while 2.7% is used for orchards or vine crops.

The municipality was part of the Yverdon District until it was dissolved on 31 August 2006, and Pomy became part of the new district of Jura-Nord Vaudois.

The municipality is located just a few kilometers south-east of Yverdon-les-Bains on the road to Moudon. It consists of the village of Pomy and the hamlet of Chevressy. The hamlet of La Grand-Fin went to the municipality of Cuarny in 1964.

The municipalities of Cronay, Cuarny, Pomy, Ursins, Valeyres-sous-Ursins and Villars-Epeney are considering a merger at a date in the future into the new municipality with an, as of 2011, undetermined name.

== Coat of arms ==
The blazon of the municipal coat of arms is Argent, from a Coupeaux Vert issuant an Apple Tree of the same fructed Gules. The apple tree (French: pommier) is an example of canting arms.

== Demographics ==
Pomy has a population (as of December 2020) of 807. As of 2008, 7.8% of the population are resident foreign nationals. Over the last 10 years (1999–2009 ) the population has changed at a rate of 22.6%. It has changed at a rate of 15.6% due to migration and at a rate of 6.8% due to births and deaths.

Most of the population (as of 2000) speaks French (556 or 95.4%) as their first language, with German being second most common (11 or 1.9%) and Italian being third (9 or 1.5%).

The age distribution, as of 2009, in Pomy is; 96 children or 14.7% of the population are between 0 and 9 years old and 91 teenagers or 14.0% are between 10 and 19. Of the adult population, 66 people or 10.1% of the population are between 20 and 29 years old. 93 people or 14.3% are between 30 and 39, 106 people or 16.3% are between 40 and 49, and 77 people or 11.8% are between 50 and 59. The senior population distribution is 54 people or 8.3% of the population are between 60 and 69 years old, 31 people or 4.8% are between 70 and 79, there are 32 people or 4.9% who are between 80 and 89, and there are 5 people or 0.8% who are 90 and older.

As of 2000, there were 263 people who were single and never married in the municipality. There were 279 married individuals, 27 widows or widowers and 14 individuals who are divorced.

As of 2000, there were 196 private households in the municipality, and an average of 2.6 persons per household. There were 48 households that consist of only one person and 17 households with five or more people. Out of a total of 203 households that answered this question, 23.6% were households made up of just one person and there was 1 adult who lived with their parents. Of the rest of the households, there are 59 married couples without children, 78 married couples with children There were 9 single parents with a child or children. There was 1 household that was made up of unrelated people and 7 households that were made up of some sort of institution or another collective housing.

In 2000 there were 68 single family homes (or 48.6% of the total) out of a total of 140 inhabited buildings. There were 25 multi-family buildings (17.9%), along with 37 multi-purpose buildings that were mostly used for housing (26.4%) and 10 other use buildings (commercial or industrial) that also had some housing (7.1%).

In 2000, a total of 189 apartments (92.6% of the total) were permanently occupied, while 8 apartments (3.9%) were seasonally occupied and 7 apartments (3.4%) were empty. As of 2009, the construction rate of new housing units was 12.3 new units per 1000 residents. The vacancy rate for the municipality, in 2010, was 0%.

The historical population is given in the following chart:

== Politics ==
In the 2007 federal election the most popular party was the SVP which received 46.36% of the vote. The next three most popular parties were the SP (12.9%), the Green Party (11.91%) and the FDP (11.81%). In the federal election, a total of 229 votes were cast, and the voter turnout was 53.4%.

== Economy ==
As of 2010, Pomy had an unemployment rate of 2%. As of 2008, there were 56 people employed in the primary economic sector and about 21 businesses involved in this sector. 41 people were employed in the secondary sector and there were 12 businesses in this sector. 108 people were employed in the tertiary sector, with 14 businesses in this sector. There were 271 residents of the municipality who were employed in some capacity, of which females made up 38.4% of the workforce.

In 2008 the total number of full-time equivalent jobs was 157. The number of jobs in the primary sector was 35, all of which were in agriculture. The number of jobs in the secondary sector was 39 of which 18 or (46.2%) were in manufacturing and 21 (53.8%) were in construction. The number of jobs in the tertiary sector was 83. In the tertiary sector; 4 or 4.8% were in wholesale or retail sales or the repair of motor vehicles, 1 was in the movement and storage of goods, 13 or 15.7% were in a hotel or restaurant, 1 was a technical professional or scientist, 3 or 3.6% were in education and 55 or 66.3% were in health care.

In 2000, there were 72 workers who commuted into the municipality and 197 workers who commuted away. The municipality is a net exporter of workers, with about 2.7 workers leaving the municipality for every one entering. Of the working population, 5.9% used public transportation to get to work, and 64.9% used a private car.

== Religion ==
From the 2000 census, 125 or 21.4% were Roman Catholic, while 370 or 63.5% belonged to the Swiss Reformed Church. Of the rest of the population, there were 35 individuals (or about 6.00% of the population) who belonged to another Christian church. There were 2 (or about 0.34% of the population) who were Islamic. 63 (or about 10.81% of the population) belonged to no church, are agnostic or atheist, and 3 individuals (or about 0.51% of the population) did not answer the question.

== Education ==
In Pomy about 240 or (41.2%) of the population have completed non-mandatory upper secondary education, and 69 or (11.8%) have completed additional higher education (either university or a Fachhochschule). Of the 69 who completed tertiary schooling, 60.9% were Swiss men, 26.1% were Swiss women, 7.2% were non-Swiss men.

In the 2009/2010 school year there were a total of 102 students in the Pomy school district. In the Vaud cantonal school system, two years of non-obligatory pre-school are provided by the political districts. During the school year, the political district provided pre-school care for a total of 578 children of which 359 children (62.1%) received subsidized pre-school care. The canton's primary school program requires students to attend for four years. There were 60 students in the municipal primary school program. The obligatory lower secondary school program lasts for six years and there were 42 students in those schools.

As of 2000, there were 8 students in Pomy who came from another municipality, while 108 residents attended schools outside the municipality.
