= Cuarny =

- Municipality
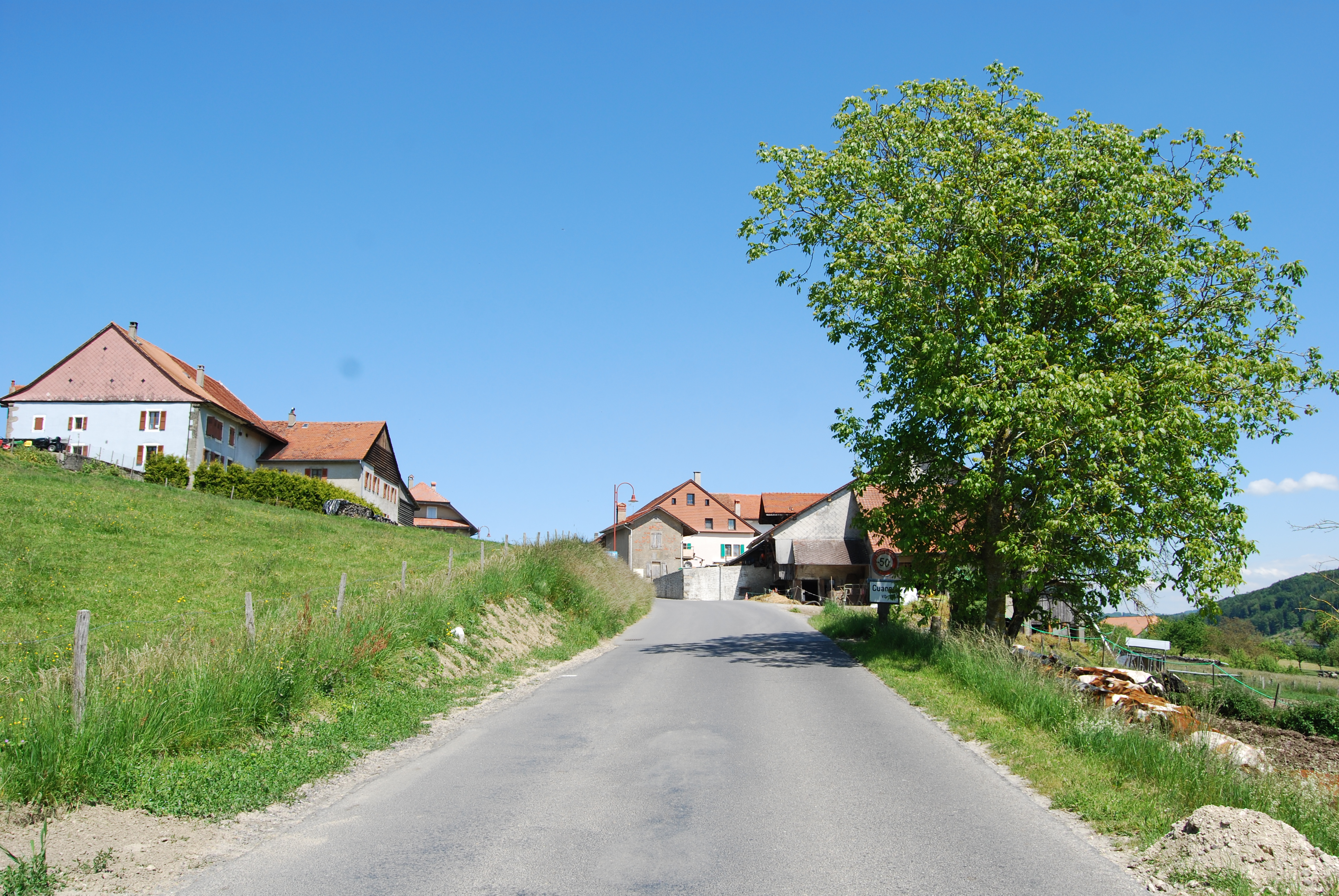

- Flag Coat of arms
- Location of Cuarny
- Location within Switzerland Location within Canton of Vaud
- Coordinates: 46°46′N 6°41′E
- Country: Switzerland
- Canton: Vaud
- District: Jura-Nord Vaudois

Government
  - Mayor: Syndic

Area
  - Total: 4.56 km^{2} (1.76 sq mi)
- Elevation: 580 m (1,900 ft)

Population (2003)
  - Total: 179
  - Density: 39.3/km^{2} (102/sq mi)
- Time zone: UTC+01:00 (CET)
  - Summer (DST): UTC+02:00 (CEST)
- Postal code: 1404
- SFOS number: 5911
- ISO 3166 code: CH-VD
- Surrounded by: Cheseaux-Noréaz, Cronay, Pomy, Villars-Epeney, Yverdon-les-Bains, Yvonand
- Website: http://www.cuarny.ch Profile (in French), SFSO statistics

Cuarny is a municipality in the district of Jura-Nord Vaudois of the canton of Vaud in Switzerland.

== History ==
Cuarny is first mentioned in 1174 as Quarnie.

== Geography ==
Cuarny has an area, as of 2009, of 4.6 square kilometers (1.8 mi^{2}). Of this area, 3.09 km^{2} (1.19 mi^{2}) or 67.6% is used for agricultural purposes, while 1.18 km^{2} (0.46 mi^{2}) or 25.8% is forested. Of the rest of the land, 0.32 km^{2} (0.12 mi^{2}) or 7.0% is settled (buildings or roads) and 0.01 km^{2} (2.5 acres) or 0.2% is unproductive land.

Of the built up area, housing and buildings made up 1.5% and transportation infrastructure made up 5.0%. Out of the forested land, all of the forested land area is covered with heavy forests. Of the agricultural land, 54.9% is used for growing crops and 9.8% is pastures, while 2.8% is used for orchards or vine crops.

The municipality was part of the Yverdon District until it was dissolved on 31 August 2006, and Cuarny became part of the new district of Jura-Nord Vaudois.

The municipality is located east of Yverdon. It consists of the linear village of Cuarny, the estate of Fignerolles and, since 1964, La Grand-Fin which came from the municipality of Pomy.

The municipalities of Cronay, Cuarny, Pomy, Ursins, Valeyres-sous-Ursins and Villars-Epeney are considering a merger on at a date in the future into the new municipality with an, as of 2011, undetermined name.

== Coat of arms ==
The blazon of the municipal coat of arms is Argent, in base three Rayonnes Gules; in chief Gules three Owls Argent.

== Demographics ==
Cuarny has a population (as of December 2020) of 232. As of 2008, 5.4% of the population are resident foreign nationals. Over the last 10 years (1999–2009 ) the population has changed at a rate of 0.6%. It has changed at a rate of -1.7% due to migration and at a rate of 3.4% due to births and deaths.

Most of the population (as of 2000) speaks French (168 or 98.2%) as their first language, with Italian being second most common (2 or 1.2%) and German being third (1 or 0.6%).

The age distribution, as of 2009, in Cuarny is; 19 children or 10.7% of the population are between 0 and 9 years old and 16 teenagers or 9.0% are between 10 and 19. Of the adult population, 25 people or 14.1% of the population are between 20 and 29 years old. 24 people or 13.6% are between 30 and 39, 32 people or 18.1% are between 40 and 49, and 28 people or 15.8% are between 50 and 59. The senior population distribution is 20 people or 11.3% of the population are between 60 and 69 years old, 6 people or 3.4% are between 70 and 79, there are 7 people or 4.0% who are between 80 and 89.

As of 2000, there were 74 people who were single and never married in the municipality. There were 86 married individuals, 5 widows or widowers and 6 individuals who are divorced.

As of 2000, there were 64 private households in the municipality, and an average of 2.6 persons per household. There were 17 households that consist of only one person and 6 households with five or more people. Out of a total of 66 households that answered this question, 25.8% were households made up of just one person. Of the rest of the households, there are 19 married couples without children, 25 married couples with children There were 3 single parents with a child or children.

In 2000 there were 19 single family homes (or 38.8% of the total) out of a total of 49 inhabited buildings. There were 9 multi-family buildings (18.4%), along with 17 multi-purpose buildings that were mostly used for housing (34.7%) and 4 other use buildings (commercial or industrial) that also had some housing (8.2%).

In 2000, a total of 59 apartments (86.8% of the total) were permanently occupied, while 6 apartments (8.8%) were seasonally occupied and 3 apartments (4.4%) were empty. As of 2009, the construction rate of new housing units was 0 new units per 1000 residents. The vacancy rate for the municipality, in 2010, was 0%.

The historical population is given in the following chart:

== Politics ==
In the 2007 federal election the most popular party was the SVP which received 55.18% of the vote. The next three most popular parties were the FDP (9.71%), the EDU Party (8.4%) and the LPS Party (7.94%). In the federal election, a total of 64 votes were cast, and the voter turnout was 49.2%.

== Economy ==
As of 2010, Cuarny had an unemployment rate of 2.9%. As of 2008, there were 26 people employed in the primary economic sector and about 12 businesses involved in this sector. 15 people were employed in the secondary sector and there were 6 businesses in this sector. 16 people were employed in the tertiary sector, with 6 businesses in this sector. There were 95 residents of the municipality who were employed in some capacity, of which females made up 35.8% of the workforce.

In 2008 the total number of full-time equivalent jobs was 42. The number of jobs in the primary sector was 16, all of which were in agriculture. The number of jobs in the secondary sector was 13 of which 8 or (61.5%) were in manufacturing and 5 (38.5%) were in construction. The number of jobs in the tertiary sector was 13. In the tertiary sector; 4 or 30.8% were in wholesale or retail sales or the repair of motor vehicles, 8 or 61.5% were in the information industry, 1 was in education.

In 2000, there were 9 workers who commuted into the municipality and 65 workers who commuted away. The municipality is a net exporter of workers, with about 7.2 workers leaving the municipality for every one entering. Of the working population, 8.4% used public transportation to get to work, and 53.7% used a private car.

== Religion ==
From the 2000 census, 20 or 11.7% were Roman Catholic, while 110 or 64.3% belonged to the Swiss Reformed Church. Of the rest of the population, there were 2 members of an Orthodox church (or about 1.17% of the population), and there were 18 individuals (or about 10.53% of the population) who belonged to another Christian church. There was 1 individual who was Jewish, and there was 1 individual who was Islamic. 23 (or about 13.45% of the population) belonged to no church, are agnostic or atheist, and 5 individuals (or about 2.92% of the population) did not answer the question.

== Education ==
In Cuarny about 68 or (39.8%) of the population have completed non-mandatory upper secondary education, and 18 or (10.5%) have completed additional higher education (either university or a Fachhochschule). Of the 18 who completed tertiary schooling, 61.1% were Swiss men, 33.3% were Swiss women.

In the 2009/2010 school year there were a total of 28 students in the Cuarny school district. In the Vaud cantonal school system, two years of non-obligatory pre-school are provided by the political districts. During the school year, the political district provided pre-school care for a total of 578 children of which 359 children (62.1%) received subsidized pre-school care. The canton's primary school program requires students to attend for four years. There were 16 students in the municipal primary school program. The obligatory lower secondary school program lasts for six years and there were 12 students in those schools.

As of 2000, there were 17 students in Cuarny who came from another municipality, while 21 residents attended schools outside the municipality.
