= Valeyres-sous-Ursins =

- Municipality
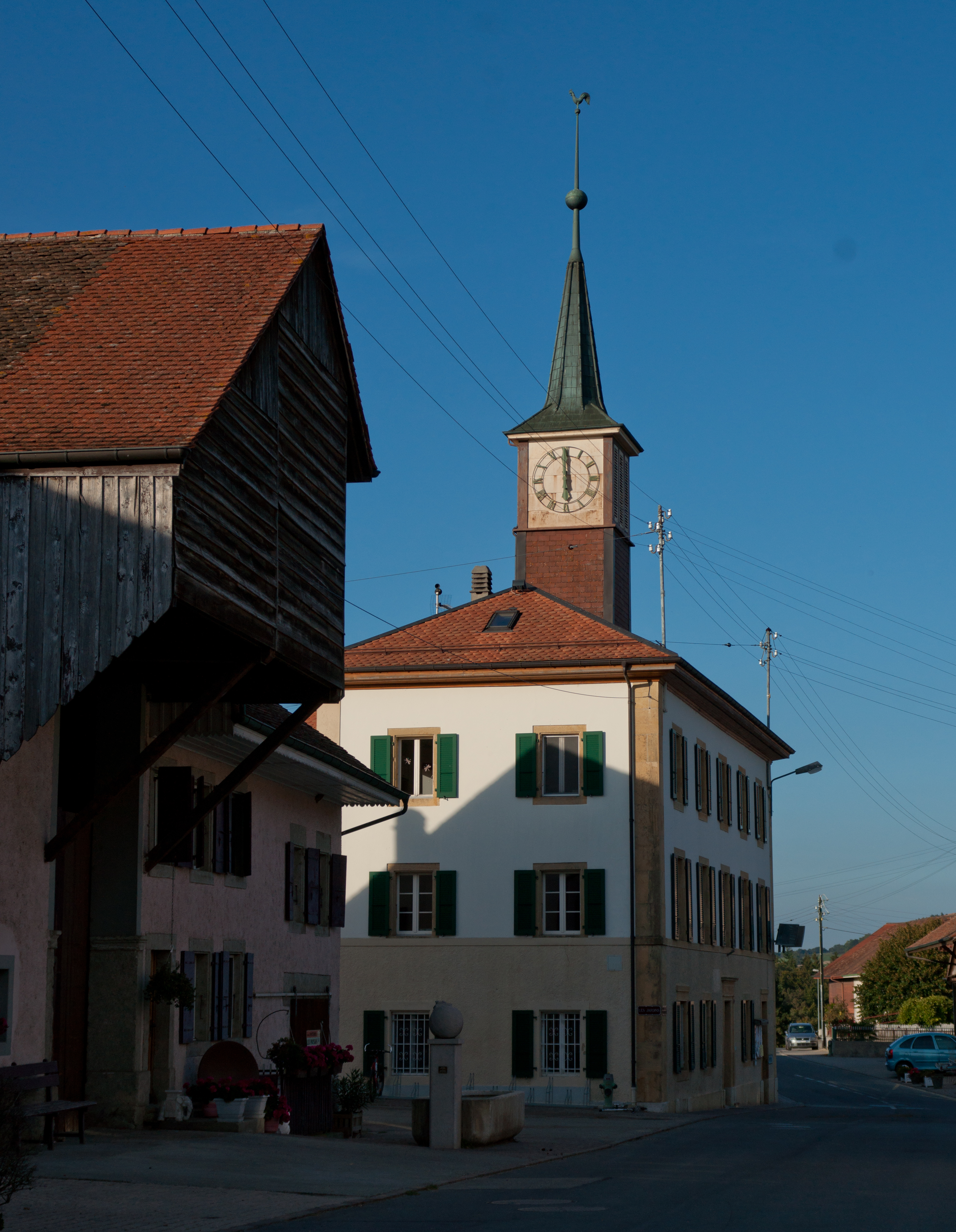
- Valeyres-sous-Ursins town hall

- Flag Coat of arms
- Location of Valeyres-sous-Ursins
- Location within Switzerland Location within Canton of Vaud
- Coordinates: 46°45′N 6°39′E
- Country: Switzerland
- Canton: Vaud
- District: Jura-Nord Vaudois

Government
  - Mayor: Syndic

Area
  - Total: 2.83 km^{2} (1.09 sq mi)
- Elevation: 551 m (1,808 ft)

Population (2003)
  - Total: 198
  - Density: 70.0/km^{2} (181/sq mi)
- Time zone: UTC+01:00 (CET)
  - Summer (DST): UTC+02:00 (CEST)
- Postal code: 1412
- SFOS number: 5934
- ISO 3166 code: CH-VD
- Surrounded by: Essertines-sur-Yverdon, Gressy, Pomy, Ursins
- Website: www.valeyres-sous-ursins.ch

Valeyres-sous-Ursins (French pronunciation: [valɛʁ su.z‿yʁsɛ̃], literally Valeyres under Ursins) is a municipality in the district of Jura-Nord Vaudois of the canton of Vaud in Switzerland.

== History ==
Valeyres-sous-Ursins is first mentioned in 1184 as de Valeres.

== Geography ==
Valeyres-sous-Ursins has an area, as of 2009, of 2.9 square kilometers (1.1 mi^{2}). Of this area, 2.18 km^{2} (0.84 mi^{2}) or 75.7% is used for agricultural purposes, while 0.55 km^{2} (0.21 mi^{2}) or 19.1% is forested. Of the rest of the land, 0.11 km^{2} (27 acres) or 3.8% is settled (buildings or roads).

Of the built up area, housing and buildings made up 2.4% and transportation infrastructure made up 1.0%. Out of the forested land, all of the forested land area is covered with heavy forests. Of the agricultural land, 63.2% is used for growing crops and 10.4% is pastures, while 2.1% is used for orchards or vine crops.

The municipality was part of the Yverdon District until it was dissolved on 31 August 2006, and Valeyres-sous-Ursins became part of the new district of Jura-Nord Vaudois.

The municipalities of Cronay, Cuarny, Pomy, Ursins, Valeyres-sous-Ursins and Villars-Epeney are considering a merger on at a date in the future into the new municipality with an, as of 2011, undetermined name.

== Coat of arms ==
The blazon of the municipal coat of arms is Vert, two Bars wavy Argent, overall a Cup Or.

== Demographics ==
Valeyres-sous-Ursins has a population (as of December 2020) of 241. As of 2008, 4.8% of the population are resident foreign nationals. Over the last 10 years (1999–2009 ) the population has changed at a rate of 32.2%. It has changed at a rate of 27.6% due to migration and at a rate of 5.7% due to births and deaths.

Most of the population (as of 2000) speaks French (172 or 95.6%) as their first language, with German being second most common (2 or 1.1%) and Italian being third (2 or 1.1%).

The age distribution, as of 2009, in Valeyres-sous-Ursins is; 37 children or 16.1% of the population are between 0 and 9 years old and 29 teenagers or 12.6% are between 10 and 19. Of the adult population, 27 people or 11.7% of the population are between 20 and 29 years old. 39 people or 17.0% are between 30 and 39, 31 people or 13.5% are between 40 and 49, and 21 people or 9.1% are between 50 and 59. The senior population distribution is 25 people or 10.9% of the population are between 60 and 69 years old, 14 people or 6.1% are between 70 and 79, there are 7 people or 3.0% who are between 80 and 89.

As of 2000, there were 68 people who were single and never married in the municipality. There were 102 married individuals, 4 widows or widowers and 6 individuals who are divorced.

As of 2000, there were 73 private households in the municipality, and an average of 2.5 persons per household. There were 19 households that consist of only one person and 4 households with five or more people. Out of a total of 73 households that answered this question, 26.0% were households made up of just one person. Of the rest of the households, there are 24 married couples without children, 26 married couples with children There were 2 single parents with a child or children. There were 2 households that were made up of unrelated people.

In 2000 there were 28 single family homes (or 51.9% of the total) out of a total of 54 inhabited buildings. There were 4 multi-family buildings (7.4%) and along with 22 multi-purpose buildings that were mostly used for housing (40.7%).

In 2000, a total of 71 apartments (95.9% of the total) were permanently occupied, while 1 apartment was seasonally occupied and 2 apartments (2.7%) were empty. As of 2009, the construction rate of new housing units was 0 new units per 1000 residents. The vacancy rate for the municipality, in 2010, was 0%.

The historical population is given in the following chart:

== Politics ==
In the 2007 federal election the most popular party was the SVP which received 45.36% of the vote. The next three most popular parties were the Green Party (16.17%), the SP (12.32%) and the EDU Party (10.69%). In the federal election, a total of 111 votes were cast, and the voter turnout was 73.5%.

== Economy ==
As of 2010, Valeyres-sous-Ursins had an unemployment rate of 3.1%. As of 2008, there were 26 people employed in the primary economic sector and about 12 businesses involved in this sector. 5 people were employed in the secondary sector and there was 1 business in this sector. 5 people were employed in the tertiary sector, with 4 businesses in this sector. There were 100 residents of the municipality who were employed in some capacity, of which females made up 37.0% of the workforce.

In 2008 the total number of full-time equivalent jobs was 23. The number of jobs in the primary sector was 14, all of which were in agriculture. The number of jobs in the secondary sector was 5, all of which were in construction. The number of jobs in the tertiary sector was 4, of which 1 was in the sale or repair of motor vehicles.

In 2000, there were 9 workers who commuted into the municipality and 67 workers who commuted away. The municipality is a net exporter of workers, with about 7.4 workers leaving the municipality for every one entering. Of the working population, 6% used public transportation to get to work, and 64% used a private car.

== Religion ==
From the 2000 census, 26 or 14.4% were Roman Catholic, while 113 or 62.8% belonged to the Swiss Reformed Church. Of the rest of the population, there were 28 individuals (or about 15.56% of the population) who belonged to another Christian church. There was 1 person who was Buddhist. 23 (or about 12.78% of the population) belonged to no church, are agnostic or atheist, and 3 individuals (or about 1.67% of the population) did not answer the question.

== Education ==
In Valeyres-sous-Ursins about 75 or (41.7%) of the population have completed non-mandatory upper secondary education, and 28 or (15.6%) have completed additional higher education (either university or a Fachhochschule). Of the 28 who completed tertiary schooling, 57.1% were Swiss men, 28.6% were Swiss women.

In the 2009/2010 school year there were a total of 39 students in the Valeyres-sous-Ursins school district. In the Vaud cantonal school system, two years of non-obligatory pre-school are provided by the political districts. During the school year, the political district provided pre-school care for a total of 578 children of which 359 children (62.1%) received subsidized pre-school care. The canton's primary school program requires students to attend for four years. There were 19 students in the municipal primary school program. The obligatory lower secondary school program lasts for six years and there were 20 students in those schools.

As of 2000, there was one student in Valeyres-sous-Ursins who came from another municipality, while 32 residents attended schools outside the municipality.
