= Cheseaux-Noréaz =

- Municipality
- Flag Coat of arms
- Location of Cheseaux-Noréaz
- Location within Switzerland Location within Canton of Vaud
- Coordinates: 46°47′N 6°41′E
- Country: Switzerland
- Canton: Vaud
- District: Jura-Nord Vaudois

Government
  - Mayor: Syndic

Area
  - Total: 6.0 km^{2} (2.3 sq mi)
- Elevation: 500 m (1,600 ft)

Population (2003)
  - Total: 510
  - Density: 85/km^{2} (220/sq mi)
- Time zone: UTC+01:00 (CET)
  - Summer (DST): UTC+02:00 (CEST)
- Postal code: 1400
- SFOS number: 5909
- ISO 3166 code: CH-VD
- Surrounded by: Bonvillars, Corcelles-près-Concise, Cuarny, Grandson, Onnens, Villars-Epeney, Yverdon-les-Bains, Yvonand
- Website: https://www.cheseaux-noreaz.ch Profile (in French), SFSO statistics

Cheseaux-Noréaz is a municipality in the district of Jura-Nord Vaudois of the canton of Vaud in Switzerland.

== History ==
Cheseaux is first mentioned in 1147 as Chesaut. Noréaz was first mentioned in 1177 as Nobraia. The two villages merged into Cheseaux-Noréaz in 1798.

== Geography ==
Cheseaux-Noréaz has an area, as of 2009, of 6 square kilometers (2.3 mi^{2}). Of this area, 1.58 km^{2} (0.61 mi^{2}) or 26.2% is used for agricultural purposes, while 3.18 km^{2} (1.23 mi^{2}) or 52.7% is forested. Of the rest of the land, 0.63 km^{2} (0.24 mi^{2}) or 10.4% is settled (buildings or roads), 0.06 km^{2} (15 acres) or 1.0% is either rivers or lakes and 0.62 km^{2} (0.24 mi^{2}) or 10.3% is unproductive land.

Of the built up area, housing and buildings made up 4.1% and transportation infrastructure made up 4.1%. while parks, green belts and sports fields made up 2.2%. Out of the forested land, 51.4% of the total land area is heavily forested and 1.3% is covered with orchards or small clusters of trees. Of the agricultural land, 18.1% is used for growing crops and 4.6% is pastures, while 3.5% is used for orchards or vine crops. Of the water in the municipality, 0.8% is in lakes and 0.2% is in rivers and streams.

The municipality was part of the Yverdon District until it was dissolved on 31 August 2006, and Cheseaux-Noréaz became part of the new district of Jura-Nord Vaudois.

The municipality is located on the eastern shore of Lake Neuchâtel. It consists of the villages of Cheseaux and Noréaz which merged in 1798.

== Coat of arms ==
The blazon of the municipal coat of arms is Vert, between two Walnuts Or on a Bend of the same three Houses Sable windowed and doored Argent.

== Demographics ==
Cheseaux-Noréaz has a population (as of December 2020) of 740. As of 2008, 9.0% of the population are resident foreign nationals. Over the last 10 years (1999–2009) the population has changed at a rate of -1.5%. It has changed at a rate of -1.5% due to migration and at a rate of -0.6% due to births and deaths.

Most of the population (as of 2000) speaks French (488 or 92.4%) as their first language, with German being second most common (27 or 5.1%) and English being third (4 or 0.8%).

The age distribution, as of 2009, in Cheseaux-Noréaz is; 52 children or 9.8% of the population are between 0 and 9 years old and 65 teenagers or 12.3% are between 10 and 19. Of the adult population, 49 people or 9.3% of the population are between 20 and 29 years old. 44 people or 8.3% are between 30 and 39, 79 people or 15.0% are between 40 and 49, and 84 people or 15.9% are between 50 and 59. The senior population distribution is 72 people or 13.6% of the population are between 60 and 69 years old, 57 people or 10.8% are between 70 and 79, there are 21 people or 4.0% who are between 80 and 89, and there are 5 people or 0.9% who are 90 and older.

As of 2000, there were 184 people who were single and never married in the municipality. There were 307 married individuals, 25 widows or widowers and 12 individuals who are divorced.

As of 2000, there were 197 private households in the municipality, and an average of 2.7 persons per household. There were 35 households that consist of only one person and 23 households with five or more people. Out of a total of 199 households that answered this question, 17.6% were households made up of just one person and there was 1 adult who lived with their parents. Of the rest of the households, there are 68 married couples without children, 84 married couples with children There were 6 single parents with a child or children. There were 3 households that were made up of unrelated people and 2 households that were made up of some sort of institution or another collective housing.

In 2000 there were 165 single family homes (or 81.3% of the total) out of a total of 203 inhabited buildings. There were 18 multi-family buildings (8.9%), along with 14 multi-purpose buildings that were mostly used for housing (6.9%) and 6 other use buildings (commercial or industrial) that also had some housing (3.0%).

In 2000, a total of 193 apartments (82.8% of the total) were permanently occupied, while 37 apartments (15.9%) were seasonally occupied and 3 apartments (1.3%) were empty. As of 2009, the construction rate of new housing units was 3.8 new units per 1000 residents. The vacancy rate for the municipality, in 2010, was 0%.

The historical population is given in the following chart:

== Heritage sites of national significance ==
The Campagne De Champittet is listed as a Swiss heritage site of national significance.

== Politics ==
In the 2007 federal election the most popular party was the SVP which received 21.6% of the vote. The next three most popular parties were the SP (17.28%), the FDP (16.81%) and the LPS Party (14.05%). In the federal election, a total of 209 votes were cast, and the voter turnout was 58.2%.

== Economy ==
As of 2010, Cheseaux-Noréaz had an unemployment rate of 3%. As of 2008, there were 26 people employed in the primary economic sector and about 6 businesses involved in this sector. 5 people were employed in the secondary sector and there were 2 businesses in this sector. 170 people were employed in the tertiary sector, with 17 businesses in this sector. There were 250 residents of the municipality who were employed in some capacity, of which females made up 39.2% of the workforce.

In 2008 the total number of full-time equivalent jobs was 169. The number of jobs in the primary sector was 20, all of which were in agriculture. The number of jobs in the secondary sector was 5 of which 1 was in manufacturing and 4 (80.0%) were in construction. The number of jobs in the tertiary sector was 144. In the tertiary sector; 2 or 1.4% were in wholesale or retail sales or the repair of motor vehicles, 22 or 15.3% were in a hotel or restaurant, 1 was in the information industry, 1 was the insurance or financial industry, 9 or 6.3% were technical professionals or scientists, 94 or 65.3% were in education and 1 was in health care.

In 2000, there were 188 workers who commuted into the municipality and 212 workers who commuted away. The municipality is a net exporter of workers, with about 1.1 workers leaving the municipality for every one entering. Of the working population, 8.4% used public transportation to get to work, and 69.2% used a private car.

== Religion ==
From the 2000 census, 125 or 23.7% were Roman Catholic, while 303 or 57.4% belonged to the Swiss Reformed Church. Of the rest of the population, there were 2 members of an Orthodox church (or about 0.38% of the population), and there were 35 individuals (or about 6.63% of the population) who belonged to another Christian church. There were 5 individuals (or about 0.95% of the population) who were Jewish, and 5 (or about 0.95% of the population) who were Islamic. There was 1 person who was Buddhist. 53 (or about 10.04% of the population) belonged to no church, are agnostic or atheist, and 16 individuals (or about 3.03% of the population) did not answer the question.

== Education ==
In Cheseaux-Noréaz about 216 or (40.9%) of the population have completed non-mandatory upper secondary education, and 123 or (23.3%) have completed additional higher education (either university or a Fachhochschule). Of the 123 who completed tertiary schooling, 69.1% were Swiss men, 22.8% were Swiss women, 6.5% were non-Swiss men.

In the 2009/2010 school year there were a total of 56 students in the Cheseaux-Noréaz school district. In the Vaud cantonal school system, two years of non-obligatory pre-school are provided by the political districts. During the school year, the political district provided pre-school care for a total of 578 children of which 359 children (62.1%) received subsidized pre-school care. The canton's primary school program requires students to attend for four years. There were 26 students in the municipal primary school program. The obligatory lower secondary school program lasts for six years and there were 30 students in those schools.

As of 2000, there were 190 students in Cheseaux-Noréaz who came from another municipality, while 103 residents attended schools outside the municipality.
