= Molondin =

- Municipality
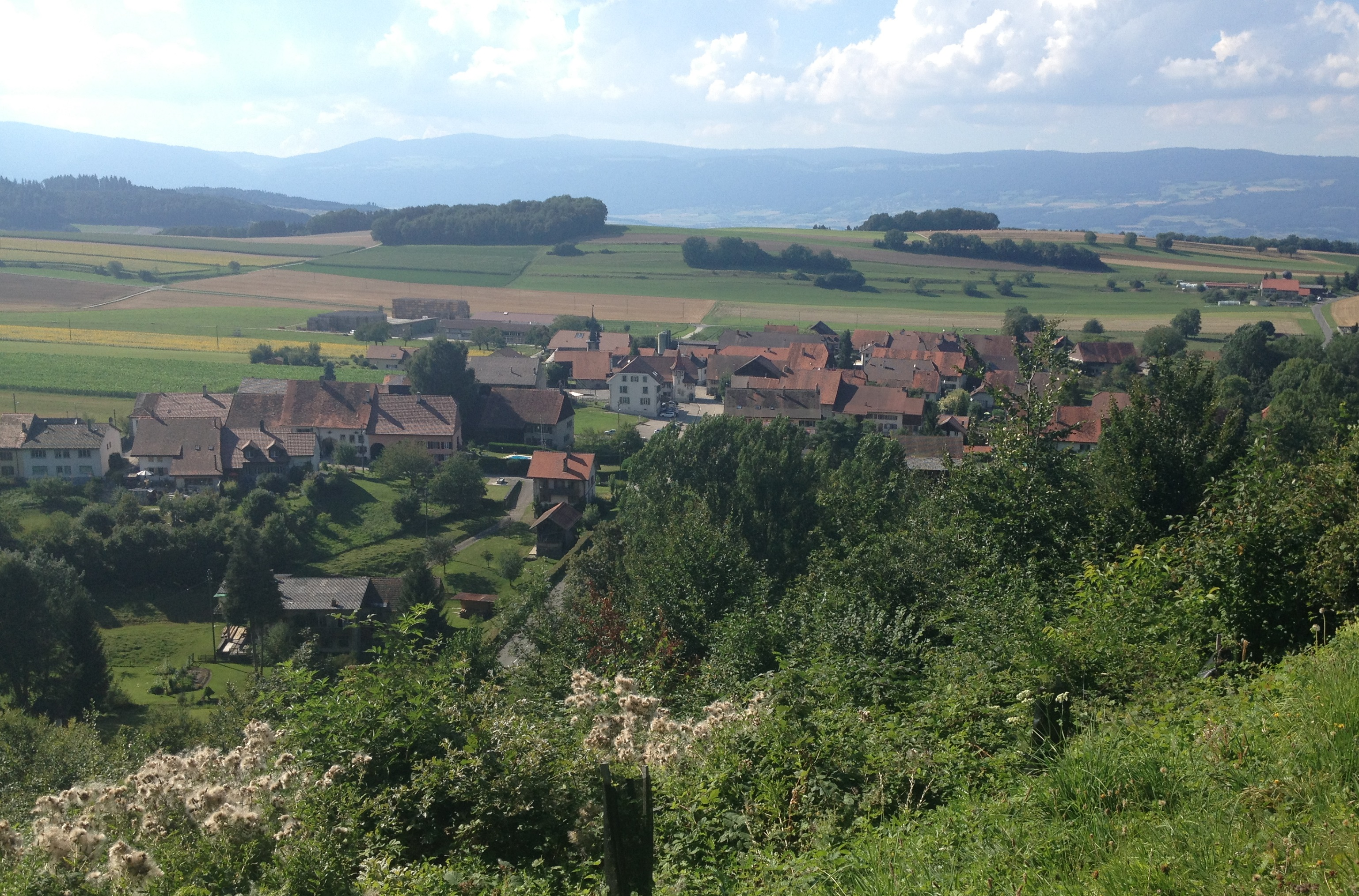

- Flag Coat of arms
- Location of Molondin
- Location within Switzerland Location within Canton of Vaud
- Coordinates: 46°46′N 6°45′E
- Country: Switzerland
- Canton: Vaud
- District: Jura-Nord Vaudois

Government
  - Mayor: Syndic

Area
  - Total: 5.53 km^{2} (2.14 sq mi)
- Elevation: 611 m (2,005 ft)

Population (2003)
  - Total: 196
  - Density: 35.4/km^{2} (91.8/sq mi)
- Time zone: UTC+01:00 (CET)
  - Summer (DST): UTC+02:00 (CEST)
- Postal code: 1415
- SFOS number: 5921
- ISO 3166 code: CH-VD
- Surrounded by: Chavannes-le-Chêne, Chêne-Pâquier, Démoret, Donneloye, Mézery-près-Donneloye, Prahins, Rovray, Yvonand
- Website: www.molondin.ch

Molondin is a municipality in the district of Jura-Nord Vaudois of the canton of Vaud in Switzerland.

== History ==
Molondin is first mentioned in 1380 as Mollondens and Mollendens.

== Geography ==
Molondin has an area, as of 2009, of 5.5 square kilometers (2.1 mi^{2}). Of this area, 3.65 km^{2} (1.41 mi^{2}) or 66.5% is used for agricultural purposes, while 1.62 km^{2} (0.63 mi^{2}) or 29.5% is forested. Of the rest of the land, 0.24 km^{2} (0.093 mi^{2}) or 4.4% is settled (buildings or roads).

Of the built up area, housing and buildings made up 1.6% and transportation infrastructure made up 2.0%. Out of the forested land, 27.9% of the total land area is heavily forested and 1.6% is covered with orchards or small clusters of trees. Of the agricultural land, 59.0% is used for growing crops and 6.7% is pastures.

The municipality was part of the Yverdon District until it was dissolved on 31 August 2006, and Molondin became part of the new district of Jura-Nord Vaudois.

The village is located on a plateau, south-west of Vallon des Vaux.

== Coat of arms ==
The blazon of the municipal coat of arms is Bendy of Eight Azure and Or, a Tower with a Wall to sinister embatteled Argent masoned Sable.

== Demographics ==
Molondin has a population (as of December 2020) of 252. As of 2008, 11.8% of the population are resident foreign nationals. Over the last 10 years (1999–2009 ) the population has changed at a rate of 6.8%. It has changed at a rate of 9.9% due to migration and at a rate of -2.1% due to births and deaths.

Most of the population (as of 2000) speaks French (172 or 95.0%) as their first language, with German being second most common (7 or 3.9%) and English being third (1 or 0.6%).

The age distribution, as of 2009, in Molondin is; 18 children or 8.8% of the population are between 0 and 9 years old and 31 teenagers or 15.1% are between 10 and 19. Of the adult population, 19 people or 9.3% of the population are between 20 and 29 years old. 29 people or 14.1% are between 30 and 39, 36 people or 17.6% are between 40 and 49, and 21 people or 10.2% are between 50 and 59. The senior population distribution is 27 people or 13.2% of the population are between 60 and 69 years old, 11 people or 5.4% are between 70 and 79, there are 11 people or 5.4% who are between 80 and 89, and there are 2 people or 1.0% who are 90 and older.

As of 2000, there were 82 people who were single and never married in the village. There were 86 married individuals, 11 widows or widowers and 2 individuals who are divorced.

As of 2000, there were 71 private households in the village, and an average of 2.5 persons per household. There were 18 households that consist of only one person and 6 households with five or more people. Out of a total of 71 households that answered this question, 25.4% were households made up of just one person and there were 2 adults who lived with their parents. Of the rest of the households, there are 20 married couples without children, 26 married couples with children There were 4 single parents with a child or children. There was 1 household that was made up of unrelated people.

In 2000 there were 37 single family homes (or 56.1% of the total) out of a total of 66 inhabited buildings. There were 7 multi-family buildings (10.6%), along with 19 multi-purpose buildings that were mostly used for housing (28.8%) and 3 other use buildings (commercial or industrial) that also had some housing (4.5%).

In 2000, a total of 67 apartments (80.7% of the total) were permanently occupied, while 11 apartments (13.3%) were seasonally occupied and 5 apartments (6.0%) were empty. As of 2009, the construction rate of new housing units was 0 new units per 1000 residents. The vacancy rate for the village, in 2010, was 0%.

The historical population is given in the following chart:

== Heritage sites of national significance ==
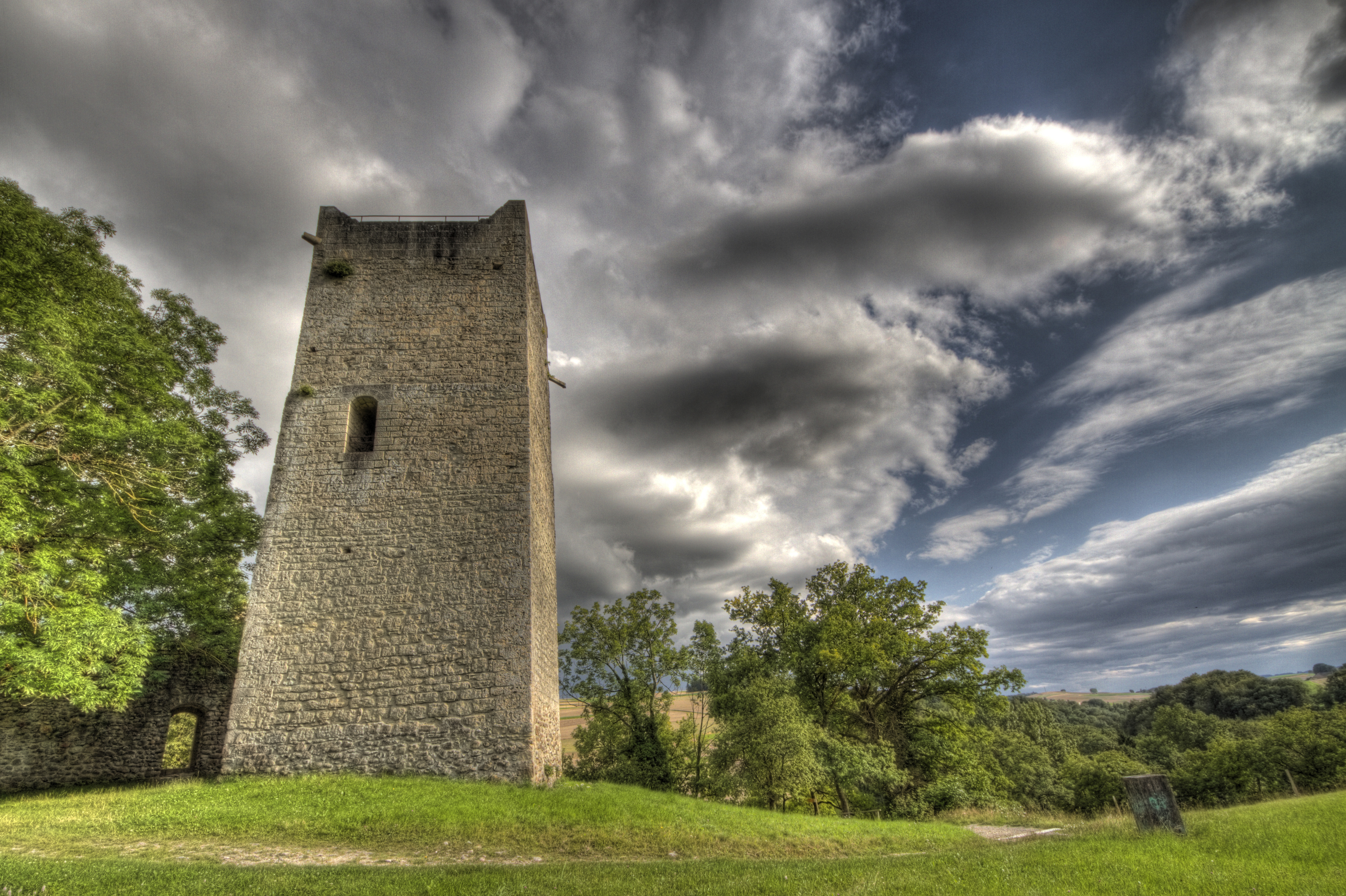
Tower of Saint Martin

The castle ruins and abandoned settlement at Saint-Martin-Du-Chêne is listed as a Swiss heritage site of national significance. The entire village of Molondin is part of the Inventory of Swiss Heritage Sites.

== Politics ==
In the 2007 federal election the most popular party was the SVP which received 41.64% of the vote. The next three most popular parties were the FDP (22.66%), the SP (14.84%) and the Green Party (6.65%). In the federal election, a total of 64 votes were cast, and the voter turnout was 45.7%.

== Economy ==
As of 2010, Molondin had an unemployment rate of 2.2%. As of 2008, there were 56 people employed in the primary economic sector and about 12 businesses involved in this sector. 7 people were employed in the secondary sector and there were 3 businesses in this sector. 23 people were employed in the tertiary sector, with 5 businesses in this sector. There were 83 residents of the village who were employed in some capacity, of which females made up 38.6% of the workforce.

In 2008 the total number of full-time equivalent jobs was 60. The number of jobs in the primary sector was 32, all of which were in agriculture. The number of jobs in the secondary sector was 6 of which 2 or (33.3%) were in manufacturing and 4 (66.7%) were in construction. The number of jobs in the tertiary sector was 22. In the tertiary sector; 17 or 77.3% were in wholesale or retail sales or the repair of motor vehicles, 2 or 9.1% were in a hotel or restaurant, 2 or 9.1% were the insurance or financial industry, 1 was in education.

In 2000, there were 9 workers who commuted into the village and 42 workers who commuted away. The village is a net exporter of workers, with about 4.7 workers leaving the village for every one entering. Of the working population, 4.8% used public transportation to get to work, and 47% used a private car.

== Religion ==
From the 2000 census, 20 or 11.0% were Roman Catholic, while 129 or 71.3% belonged to the Swiss Reformed Church. Of the rest of the population, there were 19 individuals (or about 10.50% of the population) who belonged to another Christian church. 16 (or about 8.84% of the population) belonged to no church, are agnostic or atheist, and 3 individuals (or about 1.66% of the population) did not answer the question.

== Education ==
In Molondin about 64 or (35.4%) of the population have completed non-mandatory upper secondary education, and 17 or (9.4%) have completed additional higher education (either university or a Fachhochschule). Of the 17 who completed tertiary schooling, 52.9% were Swiss men, 35.3% were Swiss women.

In the 2009/2010 school year there were a total of 31 students in the Molondin school district. In the Vaud cantonal school system, two years of non-obligatory pre-school are provided by the political districts. During the school year, the political district provided pre-school care for a total of 578 children of which 359 children (62.1%) received subsidized pre-school care. The canton's primary school program requires students to attend for four years. There were 14 students in the municipal primary school program. The obligatory lower secondary school program lasts for six years and there were 17 students in those schools.

As of 2000, there were 4 students in Molondin who came from another village, while 30 residents attended schools outside the village.
