= Belmont-sur-Yverdon =

- Municipality
- Flag Coat of arms
- Location of Belmont-sur-Yverdon
- Location within Switzerland Location within Canton of Vaud
- Coordinates: 46°45′N 6°37′E
- Country: Switzerland
- Canton: Vaud
- District: Jura-Nord Vaudois

Government
  - Mayor: Syndic

Area
  - Total: 6.47 km^{2} (2.50 sq mi)
- Elevation: 535 m (1,755 ft)

Population (2013)
  - Total: 345
  - Density: 53.3/km^{2} (138/sq mi)
- Time zone: UTC+01:00 (CET)
  - Summer (DST): UTC+02:00 (CEST)
- Postal code: 1432
- SFOS number: 5902
- ISO 3166 code: CH-VD
- Surrounded by: Épendes, Essertines-sur-Yverdon, Gressy, Suchy, Yverdon-les-Bains
- Website: http://www.belmont-sur-yverdon.ch Profile (in French), SFSO statistics

Belmont-sur-Yverdon (French pronunciation: [bɛlmɔ̃ syʁ ivɛʁdɔ̃], literally Belmont on Yverdon) is a municipality in the district of Jura-Nord Vaudois of the canton of Vaud in Switzerland.

== History ==
Belmont-sur-Yverdon is first mentioned in 1154 as castrum Bellimontis. In 1220, it was mentioned as burgum Bellimontis. The hamlet of Le Villaret is first mentioned in 1164 as Villars-Frelon.

== Geography ==
Aerial view (1963)

Belmont-sur-Yverdon has an area, as of 2009, of 6.5 square kilometers (2.5 mi^{2}). Of this area, 4.93 km^{2} (1.90 mi^{2}) or 76.2% is used for agricultural purposes, while 1.17 km^{2} (0.45 mi^{2}) or 18.1% is forested. Of the rest of the land, 0.37 km^{2} (0.14 mi^{2}) or 5.7% is settled (buildings or roads), 0.03 km^{2} (7.4 acres) or 0.5% is either rivers or lakes and 0.01 km^{2} (2.5 acres) or 0.2% is unproductive land.

Of the built up area, housing and buildings made up 1.7% and transportation infrastructure made up 4.0%. Out of the forested land, all of the forested land area is covered with heavy forests. Of the agricultural land, 66.6% is used for growing crops and 7.9% is pastures, while 1.7% is used for orchards or vine crops. All the water in the municipality is flowing water.

The municipality was part of the Yverdon District until it was dissolved on 31 August 2006, and Belmont-sur-Yverdon became part of the new district of Jura-Nord Vaudois.

It consists of the village of Belmont-sur-Yverdon and the hamlet of Le Villaret.

== Coat of arms ==
The blazon of the municipal coat of arms is Paly Argent and Azure, a castle Gules windowed and lined Sable.

== Demographics ==
Belmont-sur-Yverdon has a population (as of December 2020) of 397. As of 2008, 7.2% of the population are resident foreign nationals. Over the last 10 years (1999–2009 ) the population has changed at a rate of 23.1%. It has changed at a rate of 17.3% due to migration and at a rate of 5.3% due to births and deaths.

Most of the population (as of 2000) speaks French (239 or 96.8%) as their first language, with English being second most common (4 or 1.6%) and Portuguese being third (2 or 0.8%). There is 1 person who speaks German, 1 person who speaks Italian.

The age distribution, as of 2009, in Belmont-sur-Yverdon is; 24 children or 8.7% of the population are between 0 and 9 years old and 36 teenagers or 13.0% are between 10 and 19. Of the adult population, 36 people or 13.0% of the population are between 20 and 29 years old. 45 people or 16.2% are between 30 and 39, 46 people or 16.6% are between 40 and 49, and 32 people or 11.6% are between 50 and 59. The senior population distribution is 27 people or 9.7% of the population are between 60 and 69 years old, 19 people or 6.9% are between 70 and 79, there are 12 people or 4.3% who are between 80 and 89.

As of 2000, there were 110 people who were single and never married in the municipality. There were 110 married individuals, 16 widows or widowers and 11 individuals who are divorced.

As of 2000, there were 97 private households in the municipality, and an average of 2.5 persons per household. There were 32 households that consist of only one person and 10 households with five or more people. Out of a total of 98 households that answered this question, 32.7% were households made up of just one person and there was 1 adult who lived with their parents. Of the rest of the households, there are 16 married couples without children, 40 married couples with children There were 5 single parents with a child or children. There were 3 households that were made up of unrelated people and 1 household that was made up of some sort of institution or another collective housing.

In 2000 there were 45 single family homes (or 55.6% of the total) out of a total of 81 inhabited buildings. There were 10 multi-family buildings (12.3%) and along with 26 multi-purpose buildings that were mostly used for housing (32.1%).

In 2000, a total of 95 apartments (93.1% of the total) were permanently occupied, while 4 apartments (3.9%) were seasonally occupied and 3 apartments (2.9%) were empty. As of 2009, the construction rate of new housing units was 3.6 new units per 1000 residents. The vacancy rate for the municipality, in 2010, was 3.33%.

The historical population is given in the following chart:

== Politics ==
In the 2007 federal election the most popular party was the SVP which received 43.39% of the vote. The next three most popular parties were the FDP (15.52%), the SP (11.76%) and the Green Party (10.7%). In the federal election, a total of 87 votes were cast, and the voter turnout was 45.8%.

== Economy ==
As of 2010, Belmont-sur-Yverdon had an unemployment rate of 3.7%. As of 2008, there were 34 people employed in the primary economic sector and about 16 businesses involved in this sector. 5 people were employed in the secondary sector and there were 5 businesses in this sector. 8 people were employed in the tertiary sector, with 5 businesses in this sector. There were 109 residents of the municipality who were employed in some capacity, of which females made up 42.2% of the workforce.

In 2008 the total number of full-time equivalent jobs was 34. The number of jobs in the primary sector was 24, all of which were in agriculture. The number of jobs in the secondary sector was 4 of which 1 was in manufacturing and 3 (75.0%) were in construction. The number of jobs in the tertiary sector was 6. In the tertiary sector; 3 were in wholesale or retail sales or the repair of motor vehicles, 1 was a technical professional or scientist and 3 were in education.

In 2000, there were 9 workers who commuted into the municipality and 65 workers who commuted away. The municipality is a net exporter of workers, with about 7.2 workers leaving the municipality for every one entering. Of the working population, 6.4% used public transportation to get to work, and 55% used a private car.

== Religion ==
From the 2000 census, 23 or 9.3% were Roman Catholic, while 166 or 67.2% belonged to the Swiss Reformed Church. There was 1 individual who was Jewish, and 1 individual who belonged to another church. 54 (or about 21.86% of the population) belonged to no church, are agnostic or atheist, and 2 individuals (or about 0.81% of the population) did not answer the question.

== Education ==
In Belmont-sur-Yverdon about 94 or (38.1%) of the population have completed non-mandatory upper secondary education, and 28 or (11.3%) have completed additional higher education (either university or a Fachhochschule). Of the 28 who completed tertiary schooling, 60.7% were Swiss men, 32.1% were Swiss women.

In the 2009/2010 school year there were a total of 38 students in the Belmont-sur-Yverdon school district. In the Vaud cantonal school system, two years of non-obligatory pre-school are provided by the political districts. During the school year, the political district provided pre-school care for a total of 578 children of which 359 children (62.1%) received subsidized pre-school care. The canton's primary school program requires students to attend for four years. There were 18 students in the municipal primary school program. The obligatory lower secondary school program lasts for six years and there were 20 students in those schools.

As of 2000, there were 29 students in Belmont-sur-Yverdon who came from another municipality, while 39 residents attended schools outside the municipality.
