= Jura-Nord vaudois District =

Coordinates: 46°46′N 6°38′E

Jura-Nord vaudois District District du Jura-Nord vaudois
- District
- Country: Switzerland
- Canton: Vaud
- Capital: Yverdon-les-Bains

Area
  - Total: 701.20 km^{2} (270.73 sq mi)

Population (2020)
  - Total: 93,134
  - Density: 132.82/km^{2} (344.00/sq mi)
- Time zone: UTC+1 (CET)
  - Summer (DST): UTC+2 (CEST)
- Municipalities: 73

Jura-Nord Vaudois District (French: district du Jura-Nord vaudois, pronounced [ʒyʁa nɔʁ vodwa]) is a district in Vaud canton of Switzerland. Its capital is Yverdon-les-Bains.

== Geography ==
Jura-Nord vaudois has an area, as of 2009, of 701.20 square kilometers (270.73 sq mi). Of this area, 334.75 km^{2} (129.25 sq mi) or 47.6% is used for agricultural purposes, while 310.02 km^{2} (119.70 sq mi) or 44.1% is forested. Of the rest of the land, 48.93 km^{2} (18.89 sq mi) or 7.0% is settled (buildings or roads) and 8.98 km^{2} (3.47 sq mi) or 1.3% is unproductive land.

== Demographics ==
Jura-Nord vaudois has a population (as of December 2020) of 93,134.

In 2008 there were 605 live births to Swiss citizens and 195 births to non-Swiss citizens, and in same time span there were 608 deaths of Swiss citizens and 48 non-Swiss citizen deaths. Ignoring immigration and emigration, the population of Swiss citizens decreased by 3 while the foreign population increased by 147. There were 6 Swiss men and 11 Swiss women who immigrated back to Switzerland. At the same time, there were 581 non-Swiss men and 505 non-Swiss women who immigrated from another country to Switzerland. The total Swiss population change in 2008 (from all sources, including moves across municipal borders) was an increase of 833 and the non-Swiss population increased by 893 people. This represents a population growth rate of 2.3%.

The age distribution, as of 2009, in Jura-Nord vaudois is; 8,554 children or 10.7% of the population are between 0 and 9 years old and 9,981 teenagers or 12.5% are between 10 and 19. Of the adult population, 10,235 people or 12.8% of the population are between 20 and 29 years old. 10,835 people or 13.6% are between 30 and 39, 11,974 people or 15.0% are between 40 and 49, and 10,169 people or 12.7% are between 50 and 59. The senior population distribution is 8,264 people or 10.4% of the population are between 60 and 69 years old, 5,568 people or 7.0% are between 70 and 79, there are 3,578 people or 4.5% who are 80 and 89, and there are 607 people or 0.8% who are 90 and older.

== Politics ==
In the 2007 federal election the most popular party was the SVP which received 26.09% of the vote. The next three most popular parties were the SP (25.49%), the FDP (12.85%) and the Green Party (12.11%). In the federal election, a total of 20,765 votes were cast, and the voter turnout was 43.7%.

== Mergers and name changes ==
- On 1 January 2008 the former municipalities of Mézery-près-Donneloye and Gossens merged into the municipality of Donneloye.
- On 1 September 2006, the Grandson district (District de Grandson), Orbe district (District d'Orbe), La Vallée district (District de la Vallée) and the Yverdon district (District d'Yverdon) were dissolved and merged into the newly created Jura-Nord Vaudois district.
  - The municipalities of Bonvillars, Bullet, Champagne, Concise, Corcelles-près-Concise, Fiez, Fontaines-sur-Grandson, Fontanezier, Giez, Grandevent, Grandson, Mauborget, Mutrux, Novalles, Onnens, Provence, Romairon, Sainte-Croix, Vaugondry and Villars-Burquin came from the Grandson district (District de Grandson).
  - The municipalities of L'Abergement, Agiez, Arnex-sur-Orbe, Ballaigues, Baulmes, Bavois, Bofflens, Bretonnières, Chavornay, Les Clées, Corcelles-sur-Chavornay, Croy, Juriens, Lignerolle, Montcherand, Orbe, La Praz, Premier, Rances, Romainmôtier-Envy, Sergey, Valeyres-sous-Rances, Vallorbe, Vaulion and Vuiteboeuf came from the Orbe district (District d'Orbe).
  - The municipalities of L'Abbaye, Le Chenit and Le Lieu came from the La Vallée district (District de la Vallée).
  - The municipalities of Belmont-sur-Yverdon, Bioley-Magnoux, Chamblon, Champvent, Chanéaz, Chavannes-le-Chêne, Chêne-Pâquier, Cheseaux-Noréaz, Cronay, Cuarny, Démoret, Donneloye, Épendes and Essert-Pittet came from the Yverdon district (District d'Yverdon).
- The municipalities of Fontanezier, Romairon, Vaugondry and Villars-Burquin merged on 1 July 2011 into the new municipality of Tévenon.
- The municipalities of Essert-sous-Champvent and Villars-sous-Champvent merged on 1 January 2012 into Champvent and Prahins merged into Donneloye.
- The municipalities of Chapelle-sur-Moudon, Correvon, Denezy, Martherenges, Neyruz-sur-Moudon, Peyres-Possens, Saint-Cierges and Thierrens (all in the Gros-de-Vaud District) merged with Chanéaz on 1 January 2013 to form the new municipality of Montanaire, also in Gros-de-Vaud District.
- In 2017 the former municipalities of Corcelles-sur-Chavornay and Essert-Pittet merged into the municipality of Chavornay.

== Communes ==
Municipality	Population (31 December 2020)	Area km^{2}
Agiez	376	5.47
Arnex-sur-Orbe	637	7.61
Ballaigues	1,144	9.03
Baulmes	1,075	22.53
Bavois	994	9.34
Belmont-sur-Yverdon	397	6.47
Bioley-Magnoux	230	4.27
Bofflens	207	4.22
Bonvillars	489	7.54
Bretonnières	267	5.45
Bullet	658	16.83
Chamblon	560	2.86
Champagne	1,062	3.92
Champvent	696	9.03
Chavannes-le-Chêne	324	3.98
Chavornay	5,229	19.28
Chêne-Pâquier	143	2.12
Cheseaux-Noréaz	740	6.03
Concise	1,001	11.40
Corcelles-près-Concise	418	4.09
Cronay	396	6.59
Cuarny	232	4.57
Croy	397	4.48
Démoret	158	4.27
Donneloye	828	9.01
Épendes	389	4.83
Fiez	451	6.84
Fontaines-sur-Grandson	219	7.85
Giez	413	
Grandevent	226	
Grandson	3,358	
Juriens	336	9.36
L'Abbaye	1,474	31.88
L'Abergement	256	5.78
La Praz	175	5.12
Le Chenit	4,595	99.25
Le Lieu	887	32.55
Les Clées	187	7.04
Lignerolle	435	10.66
Mathod	651	6.59
Mauborget	127	5.51
Molondin	252	5.49
Montagny-près-Yverdon	738	3.52
Montcherand	505	3.06
Mutrux	148	3.21
Novalles	100	2.06
Onnens	506	5.11
Orbe	7,108	12.02
Orges	343	4.02
Orzens	201	4.20
Pomy	807	5.62
Premier	218	6.12
Provence	392	31.84
Rances	513	9.83
Romainmôtier-Envy	526	
Rovray	202	3.20
Sainte-Croix	4,933	39.42
Sergey	145	1.46
Suchy	655	6.66
Suscévaz	204	4.15
Tévenon	894	
Treycovagnes	485	2.08
Ursins	239	3.35
Valeyres-sous-Montagny	713	2.28
Valeyres-sous-Rances	610	6.37
Valeyres-sous-Ursins	241	2.88
Vallorbe	3,863	23.19
Vaulion	505	13.17
Villars-Epeney	100	0.86
Vugelles-La Mothe	138	3.07
Vuiteboeuf	588	5.06
Yverdon-les-Bains	29,955	11.28
Yvonand	3,470	13.39
Total	93,134	689.77
