= Grandson (disambiguation) =

A grandson is the son of one's child.

Grandson may also refer to:

== Music ==
- Grandson (musician), a Canadian-American rock artist
- Grandson, alias of Chicago drill rapper King Von
  - Grandson (album), a 2023 posthumous album by King Von
  - Grandson, Vol. 1, the 2019 debut mixtape by King Von
- "Grandson", a song by Lil Durk from Almost Healed

== Places ==
- Grandson, Switzerland, a municipality in Switzerland
- Grandson (district), a district in Switzerland
- Battle of Grandson, part of the Burgundian Wars, fought near the Swiss municipality

== Other ==
- Otto de Grandson

== See also ==
- Granddaughter
