= Tévenon =

- Municipality
- Flag Coat of arms
- Location of Tévenon
- Location within Switzerland Location within Canton of Vaud
- Coordinates: 46°50′N 06°37′E
- Country: Switzerland
- Canton: Vaud
- District: Jura-Nord Vaudois

Government
  - Mayor: Syndic; Ginette Duvoisin

Area
  - Total: 17.5 km^{2} (6.8 sq mi)

Population (2009)
  - Total: 565
  - Density: 32.3/km^{2} (83.6/sq mi)
- Time zone: UTC+01:00 (CET)
  - Summer (DST): UTC+02:00 (CEST)
- Postal code: 1423
- SFOS number: 5571
- ISO 3166 code: CH-VD
- Surrounded by: Fontaines-sur-Grandson, Mauborget
- Website: www.villars-burquin.ch

Tévenon is a municipality in the district of Jura-Nord Vaudois in the canton of Vaud in Switzerland.

The municipalities of Fontanezier, Romairon, Vaugondry and Villars-Burquin merged on 1 July 2011 into the new municipality of Tévenon.

== History ==
Before 2011, Tévenon, a municipality that is also known as "Pied-de-la-Côte", was made up of 4 different municipalities: Villars-Burquin, Vaugondry, Romairon, and Fontanezier. Romairon and Fontanezier were first mentioned in the 15th century. In 1897, a church was built in Villars-Burquin and a parish was created in the four municipalities in order to bring their populations closer together. Vaugondry and Villars-Burquin were both part of larger places but separated respectively from a lordship in Grandson, Switzerland in 1730 and from "Métralie de Fiez" in 1844 but merged with the other two municipalities, Romairon and Fontanezier in 2011 to form the municipality of Tévenon.

In September 2009 the four municipalities voted for a merge. 75% of the population agreed to the merge which was accepted and implemented on 1 July 2011. One of the main reasons the municipalities wanted to merge was because of the size of each individual municipality. It was hard to find people interested in the political life of each of the municipalities and it was getting hard to run. It is because of these small efforts to create a bond within the region of "Pied-de-la-Côte" that such a large proportion of the population voted yes to the merging of the four municipalities.

== Geography ==
After the four municipalities fused in 2011 it gave Tévenon a surface area of 1426 ha (14.26 square km). Villars-Burquin had a surface area of 481 ha (4.81 square km), Vaugondry had one of 84 ha (0.84 square km), Romairaon had one of 489 ha (4.89 square km) and Fontanezier had one of 372 ha (3.72 square km). The total surface area put it in 41st place on the list of municipalities in the canton of Vaud by size. Approximately 53% of this area is made up of forests but there are also numerous prairies thanks to Tévenon's high altitude which culminates at 1432m (at la Joux Dessus). Tévenon's lowest point is at 550m giving the municipality an average height of 749m.

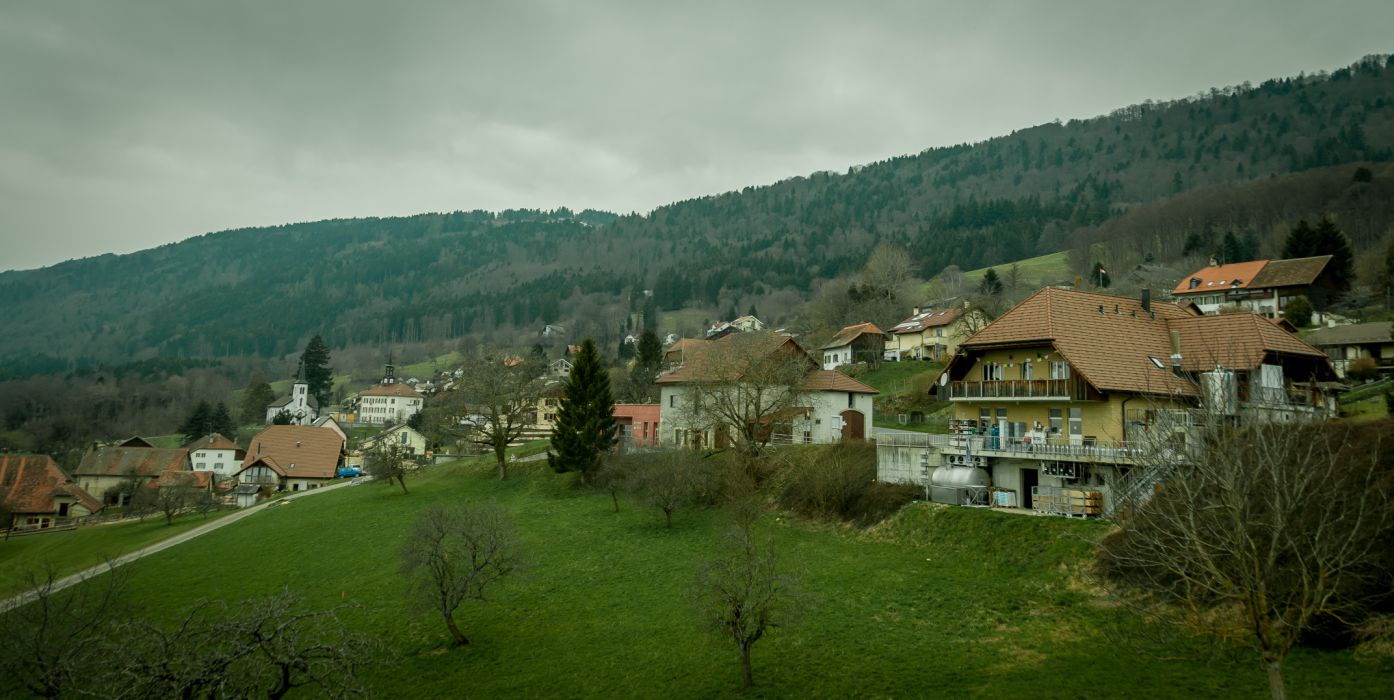
Tévenon, Switzerland

=== Weather ===
During the coldest months, even the lowest parts of Tévenon get some snow. But, in the spring, the temperatures rise and in the summer, the temperature in Tévenon is usually only 3 to 4 degrees lower than the temperatures in the main land.

The yearly average of the temperature in Tévenon in the year of 2014 was 12 °C. In the winter, the temperatures tended stay at 0 °C or just below 0 °C. During the summer, the temperatures weren't very high. In the earlier months of summer, the temperatures of Tévenon were just above 0 °C, but got up to 9 °C in the hottest months of the year.

== Accessibility ==
Villars-Burquin is situated on the cantonal road Grandson – Mauborget – Sainte-Croix, while Vaugondry and Fontanezier can be reached with the roads coming respectively from Champagne and Bonvillars. Romairon can attained be the road from Fontanezier.

== Religion ==
From the census done in all of the municipalities in 2000, we can conclude that more than half of the population that would have been Tévenon's population had the merge happened sooner, would have been part of the Swiss reformed church at that point in time.

"Religions in Tévenon"
1. Roman catholic church (15.3%)
2. Swiss reformed church (55.1%)
3. Orthodox church (0.30%)
4. Islamic (0.80%)
5. Buddhist (0.70%)
6. Other church (6.30%)
7. No church/atheist/agnostic (18.1%)
8. No answer (3.40%)

== Demographics ==
As of 2009, Tévenon had a population of 696 people (556 in Villars-Burquin, 38 in Vaugondry. 39 in Romairon and 63 in Fontanezier) of which 88% are Swiss and the remaining 12% are of foreign origin. 15% of the total population are under 18 years old.

=== Historic Population ===
The historical population is given in the following chart:

== Sights ==
The entire hamlet of Vaugondry is designated as part of the Inventory of Swiss Heritage Sites.

== Political System ==
The municipality is composed of one mayor, seven municipal councilors, one municipal secretary and one accountant. Composition of the Municipal Council, as of January 2015, are distributed as follows:

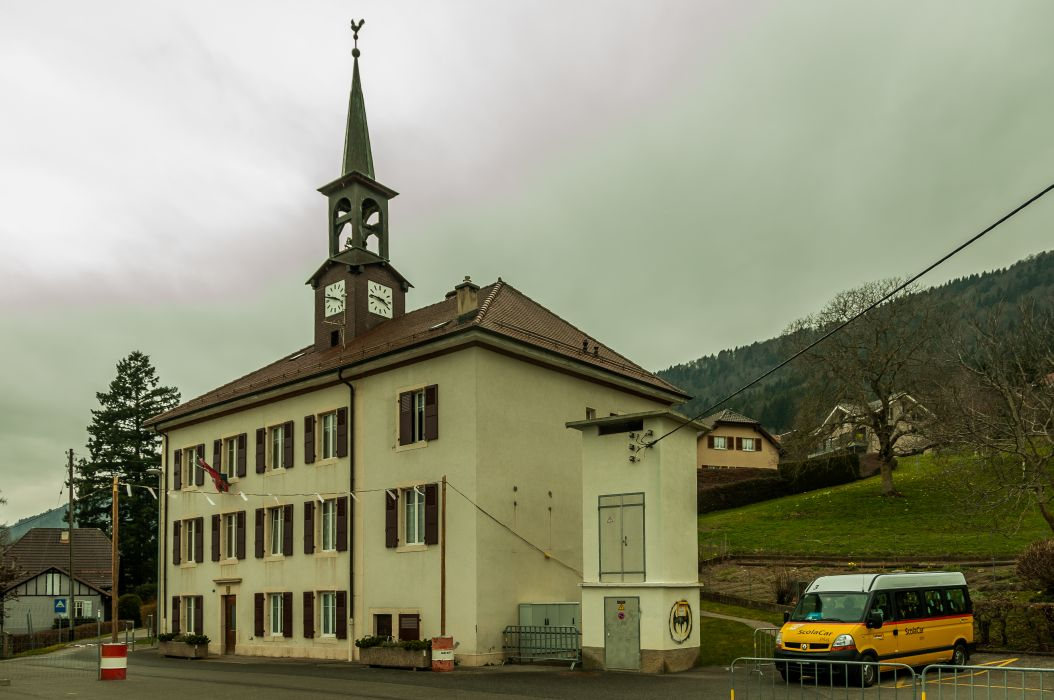
Tévenon's communal house.

Mayor:

- Ginette Duvoisin: General administration – Social affairs – Finances – Municipal staff – Health

Municipal councilors:

- Martine Dell'Orefice: Culture – Education – Environment –Mobility –Walks – Transports
- Frédy Duvoisin: Pathways – Forests – Road –Public works – Public highways
- Mary-Josée Duvoisin: Area – Housing – Heritage – Pastures – Grounds – Tourism
- Etienne Roulet: Sanitation – Waters – Sewers – Water purification – Public lighting
- Jean-Daniel Rousseil: Land development – Cimetry – Worship places – I.T. – Construction police
- Jean-Louis Clignez: I.T. – Waste – Police – Road safety

Municipal secretary:

- Anne-Claude Kehrli

Accountant:

- Monique Duvoisin

== Economics ==
The financial situation of the four municipalities was already relatively good before the fusion. Villars-Burquin achieved the construction of a fire station, and Fontanezier's budget was devoted to important sums for the installation of a wastewater network for the farms situated on the top of the village. The bill, which has been demanded by the state, was rather difficult to accept for Fontanezier and they're municipality have had to consider a few years of cushioning. Vaugondry and Romairon's municipalities didn't have a very good budget, and therefore were not able to assist in the financial cost of the wastewater network. In the 3 smallest town, the tax rate used to be at 85%, while Villard-Burquin's was at 77%. The biggest town's tax rate became the new one, when they fused together to become Tévenon. This shows how Villars-Burquin's economy and its impact was much more important than the other villages. It has since been changed to 73%.

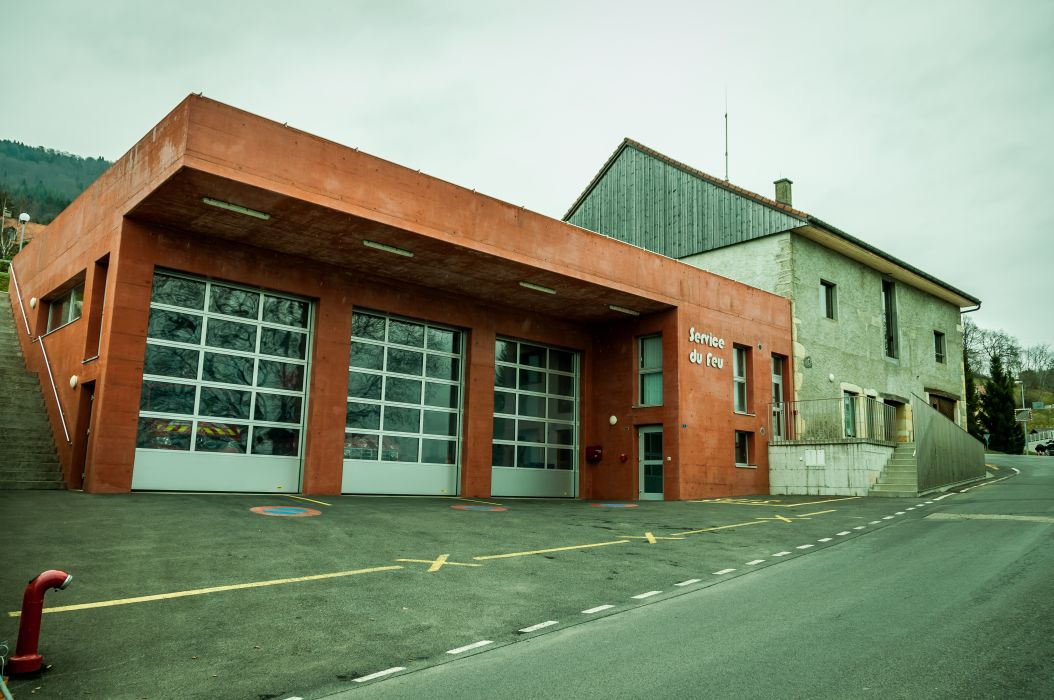
Tévenon's fire station.

=== Sectors of economic activity in 2000 ===
hover to see more details

- Primary
- Secondary
- Tertiary

According to the chart, the majority of Romairon's population works in the Primary sector. Whereas, Villars-Burquin had a majority of people working in the Tertiary sector. In fact, Romairon's inhabitants work as farmers in the proximity of their home, while Villard-Burquin's population prefers to work in another city. Contrary to popular belief, Tévenon's population doesn't have a majority of farmers. 77% of the population stated that they worked more than 10 km away from their home, and chose to live there because of its geographical position.

== Education ==
In Tévenon about 230 of the population have completed upper secondary education, and 97 have completed additional higher education (either University, University of Applied Sciences, Higher education institution of art and music or a University of teacher education).

In the 2009/2010 school year there were a total of 78 students in the Tévenon school district. The children in Tévenon, as well as all the children in the canton of Vaud, are required to attend eleven years of school.
