= Bonvillars =

- Municipality
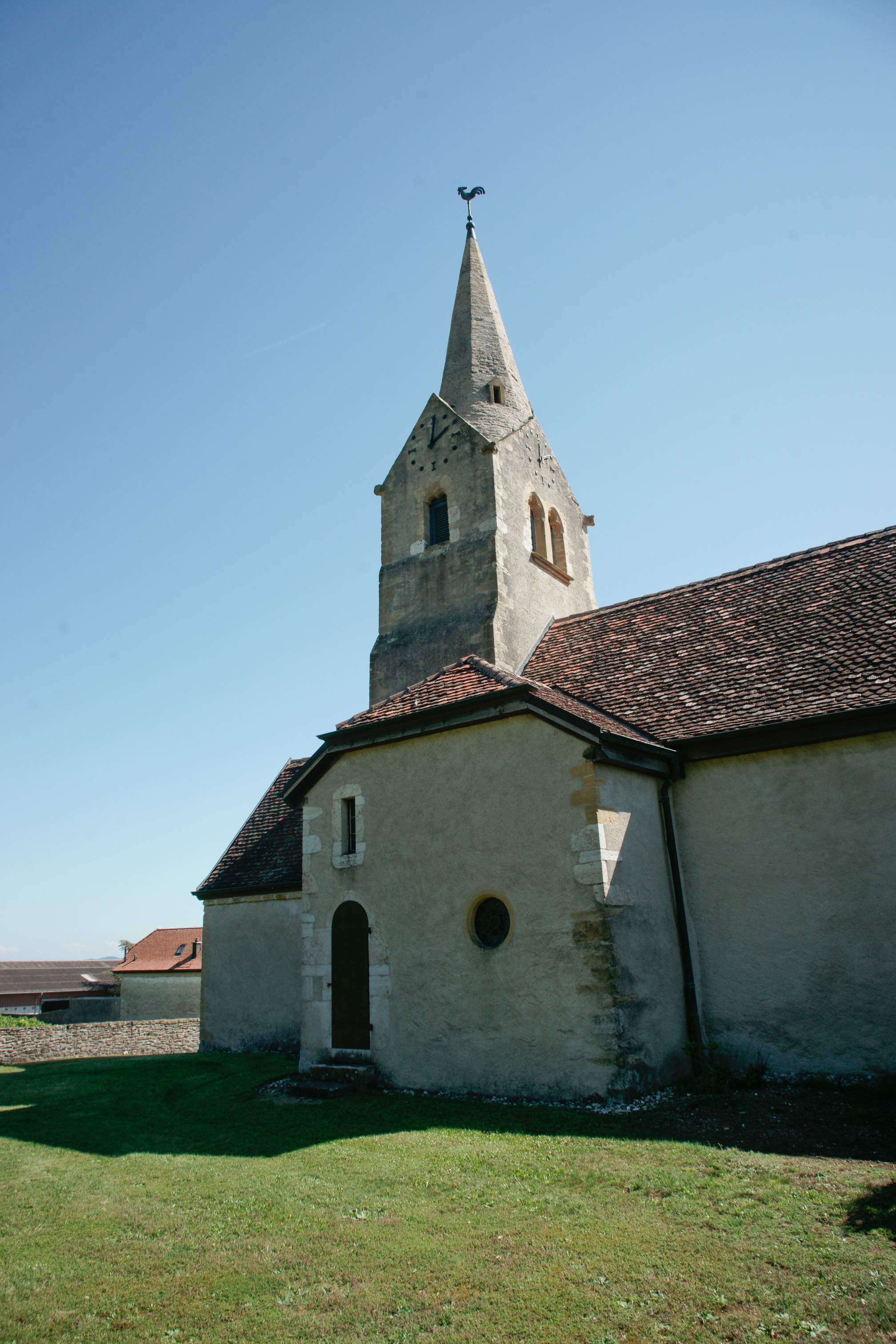

- Flag Coat of arms
- Location of Bonvillars
- Location within Switzerland Location within Canton of Vaud
- Coordinates: 46°50′N 6°40′E
- Country: Switzerland
- Canton: Vaud
- District: Jura-Nord Vaudois

Government
  - Mayor: Syndic

Area
  - Total: 7.54 km^{2} (2.91 sq mi)
- Elevation: 475 m (1,558 ft)

Population (December 2004)
  - Total: 395
  - Density: 52.4/km^{2} (136/sq mi)
- Time zone: UTC+01:00 (CET)
  - Summer (DST): UTC+02:00 (CEST)
- Postal code: 1427
- SFOS number: 5551
- ISO 3166 code: CH-VD
- Surrounded by: Champagne, Cheseaux-Noréaz, Concise, Corcelles-près-Concise, Fontanezier, Grandson, Onnens, Provence
- Website: http://www.bonvillars.ch

Bonvillars is a municipality in the district of Jura-Nord Vaudois in the canton of Vaud in Switzerland.

== History ==
Bonvillars is first mentioned in 1100 AD as Binvilar.

Local Savoyard Knight Sir John de Bonvillars (Sir Jean de Bevillard in French) was brother in law to nearby Otton de Grandson of Grandson Castle. Sir John was a household knight in the service of King Edward I of England. Bonvillars held the post of Deputy Justicier of Wales prior to being First Constable of Harlech Castle from 1285 to his death by drowning (probably during siege of Dryslwyn in South Wales) between July and November 1287. Married to Agnes de Bevillard (likely sister of Otto de Grandson).

== Geography ==
Aerial view (1949)

Bonvillars has an area, as of 2009, of 7.54 square kilometres (2.91 sq mi). Of this area, 3.66 km^{2} (1.41 sq mi) or 48.5% is used for agricultural purposes, while 3.29 km^{2} (1.27 sq mi) or 43.6% is forested. Of the rest of the land, 0.48 km^{2} (0.19 sq mi) or 6.4% is settled (buildings or roads), 0.05 km^{2} (12 acres) or 0.7% is either rivers or lakes.

Of the built up area, housing and buildings made up 1.9% and transportation infrastructure made up 2.7%. Out of the forested land, 41.9% of the total land area is heavily forested and 1.7% is covered with orchards or small clusters of trees. Of the agricultural land, 23.7% is used for growing crops and 13.5% is pastures, while 6.0% is used for orchards or vine crops and 5.3% is used for alpine pastures. All the water in the municipality is flowing water.

The municipality was part of the Grandson District until it was dissolved on 31 August 2006, and Bonvillars became part of the new district of Jura-Nord Vaudois.

The municipality is located at the foot of the Jura Mountains and stretches from Lake Neuchatel to Mont Aubert. It consists of the village of Bonvillars and the settlements of La Coudre and Les Vullierens.

== Coat of arms ==
The blazon of the municipal coat of arms is Argent, a saltire Azure, on a chief of the first three mullets of five of the second.

== Demographics ==
Bonvillars has a population (as of December 2020) of 489. As of 2008, 8.5% of the population are resident foreign nationals. Over the last 10 years (1999–2009 ) the population has changed at a rate of 29.3%. It has changed at a rate of 28.2% due to migration and at a rate of 1.4% due to births and deaths.

Most of the population (as of 2000) speaks French (330 or 95.9%), with German being second most common (8 or 2.3%) and Italian being third (3 or 0.9%).

Of the population in the municipality 107 or about 31.1% were born in Bonvillars and lived there in 2000. There were 132 or 38.4% who were born in the same canton, while 61 or 17.7% were born somewhere else in Switzerland, and 38 or 11.0% were born outside of Switzerland.

In 2008 there were 5 live births to Swiss citizens and 4 deaths of Swiss citizens. Ignoring immigration and emigration, the population of Swiss citizens increased by 1 while the foreign population remained the same. There was 1 Swiss man who emigrated from Switzerland and 2 Swiss women who immigrated back to Switzerland. At the same time, there were 3 non-Swiss men and 3 non-Swiss women who immigrated from another country to Switzerland. The total Swiss population change in 2008 (from all sources, including moves across municipal borders) was a decrease of 3 and the non-Swiss population increased by 4 people. This represents a population growth rate of 0.2%.

The age distribution, as of 2009, in Bonvillars is; 48 children or 10.6% of the population are between 0 and 9 years old and 74 teenagers or 16.3% are between 10 and 19. Of the adult population, 46 people or 10.2% of the population are between 20 and 29 years old. 67 people or 14.8% are between 30 and 39, 67 people or 14.8% are between 40 and 49, and 56 people or 12.4% are between 50 and 59. The senior population distribution is 43 people or 9.5% of the population are between 60 and 69 years old, 33 people or 7.3% are between 70 and 79, there are 16 people or 3.5% who are between 80 and 89, and there are 3 people or 0.7% who are 90 and older.

As of 2000, there were 129 people who were single and never married in the municipality. There were 168 married individuals, 26 widows or widowers and 21 individuals who are divorced.

As of 2000, there were 137 private households in the municipality, and an average of 2.5 persons per household. There were 36 households that consist of only one person and 10 households with five or more people. Out of a total of 138 households that answered this question, 26.1% were households made up of just one person and there was 1 adult who lived with their parents. Of the rest of the households, there are 40 married couples without children, 50 married couples with children There were 7 single parents with a child or children. There were 3 households that were made up of unrelated people and 1 household that was made up of some sort of institution or another collective housing.

In 2000 there were 65 single family homes (or 54.6% of the total) out of a total of 119 inhabited buildings. There were 18 multi-family buildings (15.1%), along with 32 multi-purpose buildings that were mostly used for housing (26.9%) and 4 other use buildings (commercial or industrial) that also had some housing (3.4%). Of the single family homes 33 were built before 1919, while 3 were built between 1990 and 2000. The most multi-family homes (14) were built before 1919 and the next most (2) were built between 1919 and 1945.

In 2000 there were 167 apartments in the municipality. The most common apartment size was four rooms of which there were 55. There were five single room apartments and 45 apartments with five or more rooms. Of these apartments, a total of 126 apartments (75.4% of the total) were permanently occupied, while 26 apartments (15.6%) were seasonally occupied and 15 apartments (9.0%) were empty. As of 2009, the construction rate of new housing units was 37.4 new units per 1000 residents. The vacancy rate for the municipality, in 2010, was 0%.

The historical population is given in the following chart:

== Sights ==
The entire village of Bonvillars is designated as part of the Inventory of Swiss Heritage Sites.

== Politics ==
In the 2007 federal election the most popular party was the SVP which received 27.83% of the vote. The next three most popular parties were the SP (22.05%), the FDP (17.34%) and the Green Party (12.95%). In the federal election, a total of 142 votes were cast, and the voter turnout was 43.6%.

== Economy ==
As of 2010, Bonvillars had an unemployment rate of 3.1%. As of 2008, there were 42 people employed in the primary economic sector and about 15 businesses involved in this sector. 49 people were employed in the secondary sector and there were 6 businesses in this sector. 22 people were employed in the tertiary sector, with 12 businesses in this sector. There were 165 residents of the municipality who were employed in some capacity, of which females made up 39.4% of the workforce.

In 2008 the total number of full-time equivalent jobs was 88. The number of jobs in the primary sector was 26, all of which were in agriculture. The number of jobs in the secondary sector was 44 of which 13 or (29.5%) were in manufacturing and 31 (70.5%) were in construction. The number of jobs in the tertiary sector was 18. In the tertiary sector; 2 or 11.1% were in wholesale or retail sales or the repair of motor vehicles, 1 was in the movement and storage of goods, 1 was the insurance or financial industry, 4 or 22.2% were technical professionals or scientists, 3 or 16.7% were in education and 2 or 11.1% were in health care.

In 2000, there were 50 workers who commuted into the municipality and 109 workers who commuted away. The municipality is a net exporter of workers, with about 2.2 workers leaving the municipality for every one entering. Of the working population, 6.7% used public transportation to get to work, and 64.8% used a private car.

== Religion ==
From the 2000 census, 62 or 18.0% were Roman Catholic, while 234 or 68.0% belonged to the Swiss Reformed Church. Of the rest of the population, there was 1 individual who belongs to another Christian church and 1 individual who belonged to another church. 34 (or about 9.88% of the population) belonged to no church, are agnostic or atheist, and 12 individuals (or about 3.49% of the population) did not answer the question.

== Education ==
In Bonvillars about 131 or (38.1%) of the population have completed non-mandatory upper secondary education, and 43 or (12.5%) have completed additional higher education (either university or a Fachhochschule). Of the 43 who completed tertiary schooling, 72.1% were Swiss men, 25.6% were Swiss women.

In the 2009/2010 school year there were a total of 66 students in the Bonvillars school district. In the Vaud cantonal school system, two years of non-obligatory pre-school are provided by the political districts. During the school year, the political district provided pre-school care for a total of 578 children of which 359 children (62.1%) received subsidized pre-school care. The canton's primary school program requires students to attend for four years. There were 25 students in the municipal primary school program. The obligatory lower secondary school program lasts for six years and there were 41 students in those schools.

As of 2000, there were 58 students in Bonvillars who came from another municipality, while 59 residents attended schools outside the municipality.
