= Vaugondry =

- Former municipality
- Flag Coat of arms
- Location of Vaugondry
- Location within Switzerland Location within Canton of Vaud
- Coordinates: 46°50′N 6°38′E
- Country: Switzerland
- Canton: Vaud
- District: Jura-Nord Vaudois

Government
  - Mayor: Frédy Duvoisin

Area
  - Total: 0.84 km^{2} (0.32 sq mi)
- Elevation: 729 m (2,392 ft)

Population (2009)
  - Total: 36
  - Density: 43/km^{2} (110/sq mi)
- Time zone: UTC+01:00 (CET)
  - Summer (DST): UTC+02:00 (CEST)
- Postal code: 1423
- SFOS number: 5569
- ISO 3166 code: CH-VD
- Surrounded by: Champagne, Fontaines-sur-Grandson, Romairon, Villars-Burquin
- Website: Profile (in French), SFSO statistics

Vaugondry is a former municipality in the district of Jura-Nord Vaudois in the canton of Vaud in Switzerland.

The municipalities of Fontanezier, Romairon, Vaugondry and Villars-Burquin merged on 1 July 2011 into the new municipality of Tévenon.

== Geography ==
Vaugondry has an area, as of 2009, of 0.84 square kilometers (0.32 sq mi). Of this area, 0.44 km^{2} (0.17 sq mi) or 52.4% is used for agricultural purposes, while 0.38 km^{2} (0.15 sq mi) or 45.2% is forested. Of the rest of the land, 0.02 km^{2} (4.9 acres) or 2.4% is settled (buildings or roads).

Of the built up area, housing and buildings made up 2.4% and transportation infrastructure made up 0.0%. Out of the forested land, 40.5% of the total land area is heavily forested and 4.8% is covered with orchards or small clusters of trees. Of the agricultural land, 14.3% is used for growing crops and 35.7% is pastures, while 2.4% is used for orchards or vine crops.

The municipality was part of the Grandson District until it was dissolved on 31 August 2006, and Vaugondry became part of the new district of Jura-Nord Vaudois.

== Coat of arms ==
The blazon of the municipal coat of arms is Gyrrony Or and Azure, overall a Cat effarouched statant proper.

== Demographics ==
Vaugondry has a population (as of 2009) of 36. As of 2008, 12.8% of the population are resident foreign nationals. Over the last 10 years (1999–2009 ) the population has changed at a rate of 9.1%. It has changed at a rate of -12.1% due to migration and at a rate of 21.2% due to births and deaths.

Most of the population (as of 2000) speaks French (32 or 84.2%), with Portuguese being second most common (3 or 7.9%) and German being third (2 or 5.3%).

Of the population in the municipality 5 or about 13.2% were born in Vaugondry and lived there in 2000. There were 17 or 44.7% who were born in the same canton, while 8 or 21.1% were born somewhere else in Switzerland, and 8 or 21.1% were born outside of Switzerland.

In 2008 there was 1 live birth to Swiss citizens. Ignoring immigration and emigration, the population of Swiss citizens increased by 1 while the foreign population remained the same. The total population remained the same in 2008.

The age distribution, as of 2009, in Vaugondry is; 7 children or 19.4% of the population are between 0 and 9 years old and 6 teenagers or 16.7% are between 10 and 19. Of the adult population, 5 people or 13.9% of the population are between 20 and 29 years old. 4 people or 11.1% are between 30 and 39, 5 people or 13.9% are between 40 and 49, and 6 people or 16.7% are between 50 and 59. The senior population distribution is 2 people or 5.6% of the population are between 60 and 69 years old, 1 person is between 70 and 79, there are people or 0.0% who are between 80 and 89.

As of 2000, there were 17 people who were single and never married in the municipality. There were 17 married individuals, 3 widows or widowers and 1 individuals who are divorced.

As of 2000 the average number of residents per living room was 0.59 which is about equal to the cantonal average of 0.61 per room. In this case, a room is defined as space of a housing unit of at least 4 m^{2} (40 sq ft) as normal bedrooms, dining rooms, living rooms, kitchens and habitable cellars and attics. About 60% of the total households were owner occupied, or in other words did not pay rent (though they may have a mortgage or a rent-to-own agreement).

As of 2000, there were 15 private households in the municipality, and an average of 2.5 persons per household. There were 4 households that consist of only one person and 1 household with five or more people. Out of a total of 16 households that answered this question, 25.0% were households made up of just one person. Of the rest of the households, there are 3 married couples without children, 5 married couples with children There was one single parent with a child or children. There were 2 households that were made up of unrelated people and 1 household that was made up of some sort of institution or another collective housing.

In 2000 there were 8 single family homes (or 57.1% of the total) out of a total of 14 inhabited buildings. There were 3 multi-family buildings (21.4%) and along with 3 multi-purpose buildings that were mostly used for housing (21.4%). Of the single family homes 5 were built before 1919. The most multi-family homes (3) were built before 1919.

In 2000 there were 17 apartments in the municipality. The most common apartment size was 4 rooms of which there were 8. There were single room apartments and 4 apartments with five or more rooms. Of these apartments, a total of 15 apartments (88.2% of the total) were permanently occupied, while 2 apartments (11.8%) were seasonally occupied. As of 2009, the construction rate of new housing units was 0 new units per 1000 residents. The vacancy rate for the municipality, in 2010, was 5.88%.

The historical population is given in the following chart:

== Sights ==
The entire hamlet of Vaugondry is designated as part of the Inventory of Swiss Heritage Sites.

== Politics ==
In the 2007 federal election the most popular party was the SP which received 24.29% of the vote. The next three most popular parties were the SVP (23.81%), the Green Party (19.52%) and the CVP (11.43%). In the federal election, a total of 12 votes were cast, and the voter turnout was 52.2%.

== Economy ==
As of 2010, Vaugondry had an unemployment rate of 11.6%. As of 2008, there were 4 people employed in the primary economic sector and about 2 businesses involved in this sector. No one was employed in the secondary sector or the tertiary sector. There were 17 residents of the municipality who were employed in some capacity, of which females made up 41.2% of the workforce.

In 2008 the total number of full-time equivalent jobs was 4. The number of jobs in the primary sector was 4, all of which were in agriculture. There were no jobs in the secondary sector or tertiary sector.

In 2000, there were 11 workers who commuted away from the municipality. Of the working population, 11.8% used public transportation to get to work, and 64.7% used a private car.

== Religion ==
From the 2000 census, 3 or 7.9% were Roman Catholic, while 21 or 55.3% belonged to the Swiss Reformed Church. There was 1 person who was Buddhist and 1 individual who belonged to another church. 11 (or about 28.95% of the population) belonged to no church, are agnostic or atheist, and 1 individual (or about 2.63% of the population) did not answer the question.

== Education ==
In Vaugondry about 11 or (28.9%) of the population have completed non-mandatory upper secondary education, and 8 or (21.1%) have completed additional higher education (either University or a Fachhochschule). Of the 8 who completed tertiary schooling, 12.5% were Swiss men, 50.0% were Swiss women.

In the 2009/2010 school year there were a total of 6 students in the Vaugondry school district. In the Vaud cantonal school system, two years of non-obligatory pre-school are provided by the political districts. During the school year, the political district provided pre-school care for a total of 578 children of which 359 children (62.1%) received subsidized pre-school care. The canton's primary school program requires students to attend for four years. There were 4 students in the municipal primary school program. The obligatory lower secondary school program lasts for six years and there were 2 students in those schools.

As of 2000, there were 11 students from Vaugondry who attended schools outside the municipality.
