= Romairon =

- Former municipality
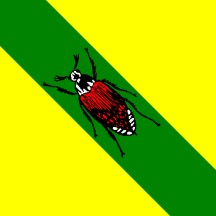
- Flag Coat of arms
- Location of Romairon
- Location within Switzerland Location within Canton of Vaud
- Coordinates: 46°51′N 06°38′E
- Country: Switzerland
- Canton: Vaud
- District: Jura-Nord Vaudois

Area
  - Total: 4.89 km^{2} (1.89 sq mi)
- Elevation: 807 m (2,648 ft)

Population (2009)
  - Total: 37
  - Density: 7.6/km^{2} (20/sq mi)
- Time zone: UTC+01:00 (CET)
  - Summer (DST): UTC+02:00 (CEST)
- Postal code: 1423
- SFOS number: 5567
- ISO 3166 code: CH-VD
- Surrounded by: Champagne, Fleurier (NE), Fontanezier, Mauborget, Môtiers (NE), Provence, Vaugondry, Villars-Burquin
- Website: Profile (in French), SFSO statistics

Romairon is a former municipality in the district of Jura-Nord Vaudois in the canton of Vaud in Switzerland.

The municipalities of Fontanezier, Romairon, Vaugondry and Villars-Burquin merged on 1 July 2011 into the new municipality of Tévenon.

== History ==
Romairon is first mentioned in 1403 as Romeyron.

== Geography ==
Romairon has an area, as of 2009, of 4.89 square kilometers (1.89 sq mi). Of this area, 1.94 km^{2} (0.75 sq mi) or 39.7% is used for agricultural purposes, while 2.79 km^{2} (1.08 sq mi) or 57.1% is forested. Of the rest of the land, 0.07 km^{2} (17 acres) or 1.4% is settled (buildings or roads) and 0.01 km^{2} (2.5 acres) or 0.2% is unproductive land.

Of the built up area, housing and buildings made up 0.6% and transportation infrastructure made up 0.6%. Out of the forested land, 50.3% of the total land area is heavily forested and 6.7% is covered with orchards or small clusters of trees. Of the agricultural land, 4.3% is used for growing crops and 7.0% is pastures and 28.2% is used for alpine pastures.

The municipality was part of the Grandson District until it was dissolved on 31 August 2006, and Romairon became part of the new district of Jura-Nord Vaudois.

The municipality is located in mountains between Chasseron and Mont Aubert, on the border with the Val-de-Travers.

== Coat of arms ==
The blazon of the municipal coat of arms is Or, on a Bend Vert a May-beetle proper bendwise.

== Demographics ==
Romairon has a population (as of 2009) of 37. As of 2008, 4.9% of the population are resident foreign nationals. Over the last 10 years (1999–2009 ) the population has changed at a rate of -15.9%. It has changed at a rate of -9.1% due to migration and at a rate of -6.8% due to births and deaths.

All of the population (as of 2000) speaks French.

Of the population in the municipality 20 or about 54.1% were born in Romairon and lived there in 2000. There were 12 or 32.4% who were born in the same canton, while 3 or 8.1% were born somewhere else in Switzerland, and 2 or 5.4% were born outside of Switzerland.

In 2008 there were 0 live births to Swiss citizens and 1 death of a Swiss citizen. Ignoring immigration and emigration, the population of Swiss citizens decreased by 1 while the foreign population remained the same. There was 1 Swiss woman who immigrated back to Switzerland. The total Swiss population remained the same in 2008 and the non-Swiss population remained the same. This represents a population growth rate of 0.0%.

The age distribution, as of 2009, in Romairon is; 1 child is between 0 and 9 years old and 4 teenagers or 10.8% are between 10 and 19. Of the adult population, 5 people or 13.5% of the population are between 20 and 29 years old. 4 people or 10.8% are between 30 and 39, 7 people or 18.9% are between 40 and 49, and 5 people or 13.5% are between 50 and 59. The senior population distribution is 5 people or 13.5% of the population are between 60 and 69 years old, 4 people or 10.8% are between 70 and 79, there are 2 people or 5.4% who are between 80 and 89.

As of 2000, there were 14 people who were single and never married in the municipality. There were 20 married individuals, 1 widows or widowers and 2 individuals who are divorced.

As of 2000 the average number of residents per living room was 0.54 which is fewer people per room than the cantonal average of 0.61 per room. In this case, a room is defined as space of a housing unit of at least 4 m^{2} (40 sq ft) as normal bedrooms, dining rooms, living rooms, kitchens and habitable cellars and attics. About 43.8% of the total households were owner occupied, or in other words did not pay rent (though they may have a mortgage or a rent-to-own agreement).

As of 2000, there were 16 private households in the municipality, and an average of 2.3 persons per household. There were 6 households that consist of only one person and 1 households with five or more people. Out of a total of 16 households that answered this question, 37.5% were households made up of just one person. Of the rest of the households, there are 5 married couples without children, 5 married couples with children

In 2000 there were 8 single family homes (or 44.4% of the total) out of a total of 18 inhabited buildings. There were 1 multi-family buildings (5.6%), along with 7 multi-purpose buildings that were mostly used for housing (38.9%) and 2 other use buildings (commercial or industrial) that also had some housing (11.1%). Of the single family homes 4 were built before 1919, while 1 was built between 1990 and 2000. The most multi-family homes (1) were built before 1919.

In 2000 there were 19 apartments in the municipality. The most common apartment size was 4 rooms of which there were 6. There was 1 single room apartment and 7 apartments with five or more rooms. Of these apartments, a total of 16 apartments (84.2% of the total) were permanently occupied, while 3 apartments (15.8%) were seasonally occupied. As of 2009, the construction rate of new housing units was 0 new units per 1000 residents. The vacancy rate for the municipality, in 2010, was 0%.

The historical population is given in the following chart:

== Politics ==
In the 2007 federal election the most popular party was the FDP which received 33.02% of the vote. The next three most popular parties were the SP (27.16%), the SVP (22.53%) and the Green Party (16.36%). In the federal election, a total of 18 votes were cast, and the voter turnout was 56.3%.

== Economy ==
As of 2010, Romairon had an unemployment rate of 2.6%. As of 2008, there were 8 people employed in the primary economic sector and about 3 businesses involved in this sector. No one was employed in the secondary sector. 4 people were employed in the tertiary sector, with 1 business in this sector. There were 16 residents of the municipality who were employed in some capacity, of which females made up 37.5% of the workforce.

In 2008 the total number of full-time equivalent jobs was 11. The number of jobs in the primary sector was 7, all of which were in agriculture. There were no jobs in the secondary sector. The number of jobs in the tertiary sector was 4 all in a hotel or restaurant.

In 2000, there were 6 workers who commuted away from the municipality. Of the working population, 0% used public transportation to get to work, and 37.5% used a private car.

== Religion ==
From the 2000 census, 4 or 10.8% were Roman Catholic, while 32 or 86.5% belonged to the Swiss Reformed Church. 1 (or about 2.70% of the population) belonged to no church, are agnostic or atheist.

== Education ==
In Romairon about 10 or (27.0%) of the population have completed non-mandatory upper secondary education, and 3 or (8.1%) have completed additional higher education (either University or a Fachhochschule). Of the 3 who completed tertiary schooling, all were Swiss men.

In the 2009/2010 school year there were a total of 2 students in the Romairon school district. In the Vaud cantonal school system, two years of non-obligatory pre-school are provided by the political districts. During the school year, the political district provided pre-school care for a total of 578 children of which 359 children (62.1%) received subsidized pre-school care. The canton's primary school program requires students to attend for four years. There was 1 student in the municipal primary school program. The obligatory lower secondary school program lasts for six years and there were no students in those schools. There was also 1 student who was home schooled or attended another non-traditional school.

As of 2000, there were 8 students from Romairon who attended schools outside the municipality.
