= Champagne, Switzerland =

Champagne
- Municipality
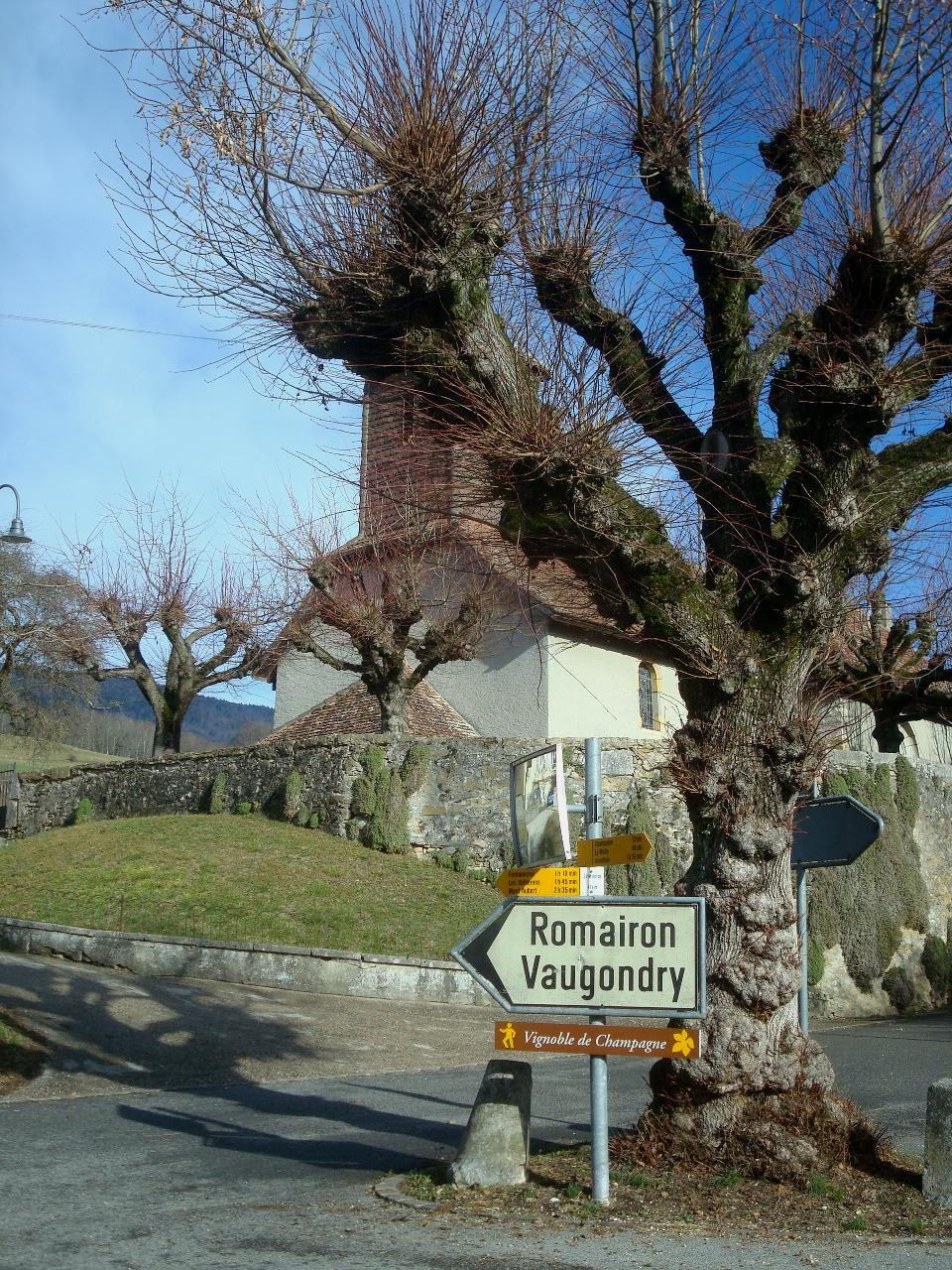
- Champagne village

- Flag Coat of arms
- Location of Champagne
- Location within Switzerland Location within Canton of Vaud
- Coordinates: 46°49′N 06°39′E
- Country: Switzerland
- Canton: Vaud
- District: Jura-Nord Vaudois

Government
  - Mayor: Syndic; Marc-André Cornu

Area
  - Total: 3.92 km^{2} (1.51 sq mi)
- Elevation: 449 m (1,473 ft)

Population (2004)
  - Total: 667
  - Density: 170/km^{2} (441/sq mi)
- Demonym(s): Lè z'Aragne; Les Champagnoux
- Time zone: UTC+01:00 (CET)
  - Summer (DST): UTC+02:00 (CEST)
- Postal code: 1424
- SFOS number: 5553
- ISO 3166 code: CH-VD
- Surrounded by: Romairon, Fontanezier, Bonvillars, Grandson, Fiez, Fontaines-sur-Grandson, Vaugondry
- Website: https://www.champagne.ch Profile (in French), SFSO statistics

Champagne (French pronunciation: [ʃɑ̃paɲ]) is a municipality in the district of Jura-Nord Vaudois in the canton of Vaud in Switzerland.

== History ==
Aerial view (1954)

Champagne is first mentioned in 885 as Campania.

In 1998 Switzerland agreed with the European Union that, in exchange for allowing Swissair to make stop overs in European Union cities, residents of the village would have to stop using its name on products they produced after 2004. After a failed lawsuit in 2002, the village was forced to remove the name in 2004. Sales dropped from 110,000 bottles of wine a year to 32,000 after the change. In April 2008, villagers voted to continue to try to use the name.

== Geography ==
Champagne has an area, as of 2009, of 3.92 square kilometers (1.51 sq mi). Of this area, 2.02 km^{2} (0.78 sq mi) or 51.5% is used for agricultural purposes, while 1.44 km^{2} (0.56 sq mi) or 36.7% is forested. Of the rest of the land, 0.39 km^{2} (0.15 sq mi) or 9.9% is settled (buildings or roads), 0.04 km^{2} (9.9 acres) or 1.0% is either rivers or lakes and 0.04 km^{2} (9.9 acres) or 1.0% is unproductive land.

Of the built up area, housing and buildings made up 4.1% and transportation infrastructure made up 3.1%. while parks, green belts and sports fields made up 1.3%. Out of the forested land, 35.2% of the total land area is heavily forested and 1.5% is covered with orchards or small clusters of trees. Of the agricultural land, 34.2% is used for growing crops and 7.9% is pastures, while 9.4% is used for orchards or vine crops. All the water in the municipality is flowing water.

The municipality was part of the Grandson District until it was dissolved on 31 August 2006, and Champagne became part of the new district of Jura-Nord Vaudois.

The municipality stretches from Lake Neuchatel to the first hills of the Jura Mountains. It is located on the western border with France. It consists of the village of Champagne and the hamlets of Saint-Maurice, Les Pasquières and Sous le Closel.

== Coat of arms ==
The blazon of the municipal coat of arms is Azure, three mushrooms Or two and one

== Demographics ==
Champagne has a population (as of December 2020) of 1,062. As of 2008, 12.5% of the population are resident foreign nationals. Over the last 10 years (1999–2009) the population has changed at a rate of 19.8%. It has changed at a rate of 15.3% due to migration and at a rate of 5.7% due to births and deaths.

Most of the population (as of 2000) speaks French (592 or 90.7%), with Portuguese being second most common (18 or 2.8%) and German being third (12 or 1.8%). There are 11 people who speak Italian.

Of the population in the municipality 183 or about 28.0% were born in Champagne and lived there in 2000. There were 263 or 40.3% who were born in the same canton, while 106 or 16.2% were born somewhere else in Switzerland, and 98 or 15.0% were born outside of Switzerland.

In 2008 there were 11 live births to Swiss citizens and were 6 deaths of Swiss citizens. Ignoring immigration and emigration, the population of Swiss citizens increased by 5 while the foreign population remained the same. There were 2 Swiss women who immigrated back to Switzerland. At the same time, there was 1 non-Swiss man who emigrated from Switzerland to another country and 3 non-Swiss women who immigrated from another country to Switzerland. The total Swiss population change in 2008 (from all sources, including moves across municipal borders) was an increase of 22 and the non-Swiss population decreased by 13 people. This represents a population growth rate of 1.2%.

The age distribution, as of 2009, in Champagne is; 93 children or 11.7% of the population are between 0 and 9 years old and 128 teenagers or 16.1% are between 10 and 19. Of the adult population, 86 people or 10.8% of the population are between 20 and 29 years old. 120 people or 15.1% are between 30 and 39, 126 people or 15.9% are between 40 and 49, and 109 people or 13.7% are between 50 and 59. The senior population distribution is 63 people or 7.9% of the population are between 60 and 69 years old, 44 people or 5.5% are between 70 and 79, there are 16 people or 2.0% who are between 80 and 89, and there are 8 people or 1.0% who are 90 and older.

As of 2000, there were 269 people who were single and never married in the municipality. There were 309 married individuals, 36 widows or widowers and 39 individuals who had divorced.

As of 2000, there were 261 private households in the municipality, and an average of 2.5 persons per household. There were 80 households that consist of only one person and 18 households with five or more people. Out of a total of 265 households that answered this question, 30.2% were households made up of just one person and there were 3 adults who lived with their parents. Of the rest of the households, there are 62 married couples without children, 104 married couples with children There were 7 single parents with a child or children. There were 5 households that were made up of unrelated people and 4 households that were made up of some sort of institution or another collective housing.

In 2000 there were 92 single family homes (or 58.6% of the total) out of a total of 157 inhabited buildings. There were 38 multi-family buildings (24.2%), along with 21 multi-purpose buildings that were mostly used for housing (13.4%) and 6 other use buildings (commercial or industrial) that also had some housing (3.8%). Of the single family homes 33 were built before 1919, while 15 were built between 1990 and 2000. The most multi-family homes (18) were built before 1919 and the next most (4) were built between 1919 and 1945. There were 2 multi-family houses built between 1996 and 2000.

In 2000 there were 280 apartments in the municipality. The most common apartment size was 4 rooms of which there were 87. There were 9 single room apartments and 82 apartments with five or more rooms. Of these apartments, a total of 257 apartments (91.8% of the total) were permanently occupied, while 8 apartments (2.9%) were seasonally occupied and 15 apartments (5.4%) were empty. As of 2009, the construction rate of new housing units was 13.9 new units per 1000 residents. The vacancy rate for the municipality, in 2010, was 0.94%.

The historical population is given in the following chart:

== Sights ==
The entire village of Champagne is designated as part of the Inventory of Swiss Heritage Sites

== Politics ==
In the 2007 federal election the most popular party was the SVP which received 30.06% of the vote. The next three most popular parties were the FDP (18.75%), the SP (15.89%) and the Green Party (11.94%). In the federal election, a total of 196 votes were cast, and the voter turnout was 42.9%.

== Economy ==
As of 2010, Champagne had an unemployment rate of 4.3%. As of 2008, there were 22 people employed in the primary economic sector and about 8 businesses involved in this sector. 258 people were employed in the secondary sector and there were 9 businesses in this sector. 36 people were employed in the tertiary sector, with 16 businesses in this sector. There were 328 residents of the municipality who were employed in some capacity, of which females made up 39.9% of the workforce.

In 2008 the total number of full-time equivalent jobs was 291. The number of jobs in the primary sector was 15, all of which were in agriculture. The number of jobs in the secondary sector was 248 of which 235 or (94.8%) were in manufacturing and 13 (5.2%) were in construction. The number of jobs in the tertiary sector was 28. In the tertiary sector; 13 or 46.4% were in wholesale or retail sales or the repair of motor vehicles, 1 was in the movement and storage of goods, 3 or 10.7% were in a hotel or restaurant, 1 was in the information industry, 5 or 17.9% were technical professionals or scientists.

In 2000, there were 237 workers who commuted into the municipality and 216 workers who commuted away. The municipality is a net importer of workers, with about 1.1 workers entering the municipality for every one leaving. About 10.5% of the workforce coming into Champagne are coming from outside Switzerland. Of the working population, 7.9% used public transportation to get to work, and 61.3% used a private car.

== Religion ==
From the 2000 census, 161 or 24.7% were Roman Catholic, while 353 or 54.1% belonged to the Swiss Reformed Church. Of the rest of the population, there were 4 members of an Orthodox church (or about 0.61% of the population), there were 2 individuals (or about 0.31% of the population) who belonged to the Christian Catholic Church, and there were 46 individuals (or about 7.04% of the population) who belonged to another Christian church. There were 16 (or about 2.45% of the population) who were Islamic. 80 (or about 12.25% of the population) belonged to no church, are agnostic or atheist, and 14 individuals (or about 2.14% of the population) did not answer the question.

== Education ==
In Champagne about 264 or (40.4%) of the population have completed non-mandatory upper secondary education, and 84 or (12.9%) have completed additional higher education (either university or a Fachhochschule). Of the 84 who completed tertiary schooling, 60.7% were Swiss men, 23.8% were Swiss women, 8.3% were non-Swiss men and 7.1% were non-Swiss women.

In the 2009/2010 school year there were a total of 122 students in the Champagne school district. In the Vaud cantonal school system, two years of non-obligatory pre-school are provided by the political districts. During the school year, the political district provided pre-school care for a total of 578 children of which 359 children (62.1%) received subsidized pre-school care. The canton's primary school program requires students to attend for four years. There were 62 students in the municipal primary school program. The obligatory lower secondary school program lasts for six years and there were 59 students in those schools. There were also 1 students who were home schooled or attended another non-traditional school.

As of 2000, there were 97 students in Champagne who came from another municipality, while 94 residents attended schools outside the municipality.
