= Villars-Burquin =

- Former municipality
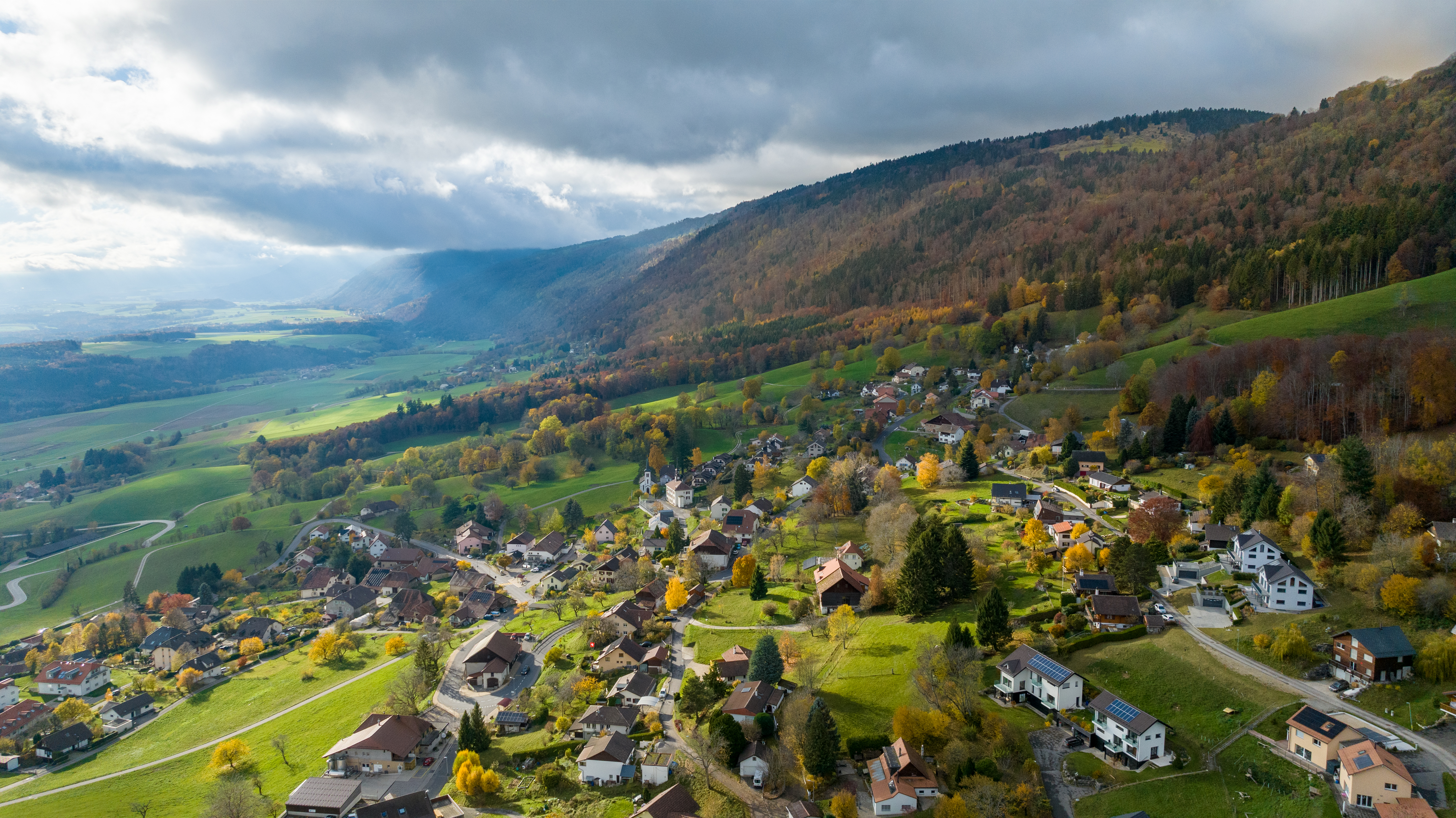

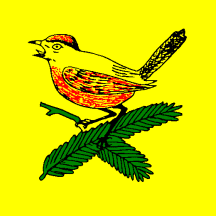
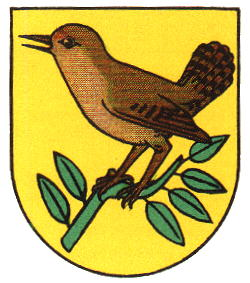
- Flag Coat of arms
- Location of Villars-Burquin
- Location within Switzerland Location within Canton of Vaud
- Coordinates: 46°50′N 06°37′E
- Country: Switzerland
- Canton: Vaud
- District: Jura-Nord Vaudois

Government
  - Mayor: Michel Cerinotti

Area
  - Total: 4.82 km^{2} (1.86 sq mi)
- Elevation: 749 m (2,457 ft)

Population (2009)
  - Total: 565
  - Density: 117/km^{2} (304/sq mi)
- Demonym: Les Roitelets
- Time zone: UTC+01:00 (CET)
  - Summer (DST): UTC+02:00 (CEST)
- Postal code: 1423
- SFOS number: 5570
- ISO 3166 code: CH-VD
- Surrounded by: Romairon, Vaugondry, Fontaines-sur-Grandson, Mauborget
- Website: www.villars-burquin.ch

Villars-Burquin is a former municipality in the district of Jura-Nord Vaudois in the canton of Vaud in Switzerland.

The municipalities of Fontanezier, Romairon, Vaugondry and Villars-Burquin merged on 1 July 2011 into the new municipality of Tévenon.

== Geography ==
Villars-Burquin has an area, as of 2009, of 4.82 square kilometers (1.86 sq mi). Of this area, 1.6 km^{2} (0.62 sq mi) or 33.2% is used for agricultural purposes, while 2.94 km^{2} (1.14 sq mi) or 61.0% is forested. Of the rest of the land, 0.26 km^{2} (0.10 sq mi) or 5.4% is settled (buildings or roads) and 0.02 km^{2} (4.9 acres) or 0.4% is unproductive land.

Of the built up area, housing and buildings made up 3.9% and transportation infrastructure made up 0.8%. Out of the forested land, 56.4% of the total land area is heavily forested and 4.6% is covered with orchards or small clusters of trees. Of the agricultural land, 3.7% is used for growing crops and 19.9% is pastures, while 1.9% is used for orchards or vine crops and 7.7% is used for alpine pastures.

The municipality was part of the Grandson District until it was dissolved on 31 August 2006, and Villars-Burquin became part of the new district of Jura-Nord Vaudois.

== Coat of arms ==
The blazon of the municipal coat of arms is Or, on two Pine Branches in saltire a Wren proper.

== Demographics ==
Villars-Burquin has a population (as of 2009) of 565. As of 2008, 8.2% of the population are resident foreign nationals. Over the last 10 years (1999–2009 ) the population has changed at a rate of 18%. It has changed at a rate of 15.7% due to migration and at a rate of 2.3% due to births and deaths.

Most of the population (as of 2000) speaks French (460 or 91.3%), with German being second most common (24 or 4.8%) and Italian being third (4 or 0.8%).

Of the population in the municipality 80 or about 15.9% were born in Villars-Burquin and lived there in 2000. There were 187 or 37.1% who were born in the same canton, while 139 or 27.6% were born somewhere else in Switzerland, and 70 or 13.9% were born outside of Switzerland.

In 2008 there were 6 live births to Swiss citizens and were 5 deaths of Swiss citizens. Ignoring immigration and emigration, the population of Swiss citizens increased by 1 while the foreign population remained the same. There was 1 Swiss woman who emigrated from Switzerland. At the same time, there were 2 non-Swiss men who emigrated from Switzerland to another country. The total Swiss population change in 2008 (from all sources, including moves across municipal borders) was an increase of 14 and the non-Swiss population increased by 5 people. This represents a population growth rate of 3.5%.

The age distribution, as of 2009, in Villars-Burquin is; 61 children or 10.8% of the population are between 0 and 9 years old and 65 teenagers or 11.5% are between 10 and 19. Of the adult population, 56 people or 9.9% of the population are between 20 and 29 years old. 75 people or 13.3% are between 30 and 39, 87 people or 15.4% are between 40 and 49, and 87 people or 15.4% are between 50 and 59. The senior population distribution is 70 people or 12.4% of the population are between 60 and 69 years old, 35 people or 6.2% are between 70 and 79, there are 22 people or 3.9% who are between 80 and 89, and there are 6 people or 1.1% who are 90 and older.

As of 2000, there were 182 people who were single and never married in the municipality. There were 240 married individuals, 44 widows or widowers and 38 individuals who are divorced.

As of 2000 the average number of residents per living room was 0.56 which is about equal to the cantonal average of 0.61 per room. In this case, a room is defined as space of a housing unit of at least 4 m^{2} (40 sq ft) as normal bedrooms, dining rooms, living rooms, kitchens and habitable cellars and attics. About 62.5% of the total households were owner occupied, or in other words did not pay rent (though they may have a mortgage or a rent-to-own agreement).

As of 2000, there were 197 private households in the municipality, and an average of 2.4 persons per household. There were 58 households that consist of only one person and 14 households with five or more people. Out of a total of 204 households that answered this question, 28.4% were households made up of just one person. Of the rest of the households, there are 61 married couples without children, 63 married couples with children There were 12 single parents with a child or children. There were 3 households that were made up of unrelated people and 7 households that were made up of some sort of institution or another collective housing.

In 2000 there were 142 single family homes (or 74.7% of the total) out of a total of 190 inhabited buildings. There were 26 multi-family buildings (13.7%), along with 16 multi-purpose buildings that were mostly used for housing (8.4%) and 6 other use buildings (commercial or industrial) that also had some housing (3.2%). Of the single family homes 22 were built before 1919, while 23 were built between 1990 and 2000. The greatest number of single family homes (37) were built between 1971 and 1980. The most multi-family homes (8) were built before 1919 and the next most (5) were built between 1971 and 1980. There was 1 multi-family house built between 1996 and 2000.

In 2000 there were 240 apartments in the municipality. The most common apartment size was 4 rooms of which there were 76. There were 8 single room apartments and 72 apartments with five or more rooms. Of these apartments, a total of 192 apartments (80.0% of the total) were permanently occupied, while 39 apartments (16.3%) were seasonally occupied and 9 apartments (3.8%) were empty. As of 2009, the construction rate of new housing units was 8.8 new units per 1000 residents. The vacancy rate for the municipality, in 2010, was 0.74%.

The historical population is given in the following chart:

== Politics ==
In the 2007 federal election the most popular party was the SVP which received 30.21% of the vote. The next three most popular parties were the SP (20.41%), the Green Party (17.08%) and the FDP (11.57%). In the federal election, a total of 191 votes were cast, and the voter turnout was 51.1%.

== Economy ==
As of 2010, Villars-Burquin had an unemployment rate of 5.3%. As of 2008, there were 15 people employed in the primary economic sector and about 5 businesses involved in this sector. 30 people were employed in the secondary sector and there were 3 businesses in this sector. 49 people were employed in the tertiary sector, with 9 businesses in this sector. There were 229 residents of the municipality who were employed in some capacity, of which females made up 44.5% of the workforce.

In 2008 the total number of full-time equivalent jobs was 80. The number of jobs in the primary sector was 13, of which 6 were in agriculture and 7 were in forestry or lumber production. The number of jobs in the secondary sector was 26, all of which were in manufacturing. The number of jobs in the tertiary sector was 41. In the tertiary sector; 1 was in the sale or repair of motor vehicles, 3 or 7.3% were in a hotel or restaurant, 1 was in the information industry, 2 or 4.9% were the insurance or financial industry, 1 was a technical professional or scientist, 1 was in education and 31 or 75.6% were in health care.

In 2000, there were 36 workers who commuted into the municipality and 171 workers who commuted away. The municipality is a net exporter of workers, with about 4.8 workers leaving the municipality for every one entering. About 11.1% of the workforce coming into Villars-Burquin are coming from outside Switzerland. Of the working population, 9.2% used public transportation to get to work, and 69.4% used a private car.

== Religion ==
From the 2000 census, 92 or 18.3% were Roman Catholic, while 267 or 53.0% belonged to the Swiss Reformed Church. Of the rest of the population, there was 1 member of an Orthodox church, and there were 32 individuals (or about 6.35% of the population) who belonged to another Christian church. There were 5 (or about 0.99% of the population) who were Islamic. There were 4 individuals who were Buddhist. 98 (or about 19.44% of the population) belonged to no church, are agnostic or atheist, and 21 individuals (or about 4.17% of the population) did not answer the question.

== Education ==
In Villars-Burquin about 189 or (37.5%) of the population have completed non-mandatory upper secondary education, and 75 or (14.9%) have completed additional higher education (either University or a Fachhochschule). Of the 75 who completed tertiary schooling, 58.7% were Swiss men, 28.0% were Swiss women, 10.7% were non-Swiss men.

In the 2009/2010 school year there were a total of 65 students in the Villars-Burquin school district. In the Vaud cantonal school system, two years of non-obligatory pre-school are provided by the political districts. During the school year, the political district provided pre-school care for a total of 578 children of which 359 children (62.1%) received subsidized pre-school care. The canton's primary school program requires students to attend for four years. There were 37 students in the municipal primary school program. The obligatory lower secondary school program lasts for six years and there were 28 students in those schools.

As of 2000, there were 3 students in Villars-Burquin who came from another municipality, while 77 residents attended schools outside the municipality.
