= Mauborget =

- Municipality
- Flag Coat of arms
- Location of Mauborget
- Location within Switzerland Location within Canton of Vaud
- Coordinates: 46°51′N 06°36′E
- Country: Switzerland
- Canton: Vaud
- District: Jura-Nord Vaudois

Government
  - Mayor: Syndic; Claude Roulet

Area
  - Total: 5.51 km^{2} (2.13 sq mi)
- Elevation: 1,173 m (3,848 ft)

Population (2004)
  - Total: 97
  - Density: 18/km^{2} (46/sq mi)
- Demonym(s): Lè Tsayou; Les Grillons
- Time zone: UTC+01:00 (CET)
  - Summer (DST): UTC+02:00 (CEST)
- Postal code: 1453
- SFOS number: 5562
- ISO 3166 code: CH-VD
- Surrounded by: Fleurier (NE), Romairon, Villars-Burquin, Fontaines-sur-Grandson
- Website: mauborget.ch

Mauborget (French pronunciation: [mobɔʁʒɛ]) is a municipality in the district of Jura-Nord Vaudois in the canton of Vaud in Switzerland.

== History ==
Mauborget is first mentioned in 1403 as Malborget.

== Geography ==
Mauborget has an area, as of 2009, of 5.51 square kilometers (2.13 sq mi). Of this area, 1.4 km^{2} (0.54 sq mi) or 25.4% is used for agricultural purposes, while 3.89 km^{2} (1.50 sq mi) or 70.6% is forested. Of the rest of the land, 0.23 km^{2} (0.089 sq mi) or 4.2% is settled (buildings or roads) and 0.01 km^{2} (2.5 acres) or 0.2% is unproductive land.

Of the built up area, housing and buildings made up 1.6% and transportation infrastructure made up 2.5%. Out of the forested land, 67.2% of the total land area is heavily forested and 3.4% is covered with orchards or small clusters of trees. Of the agricultural land, 0.0% is used for growing crops and 16.2% is pastures and 9.3% is used for alpine pastures.

The municipality was part of the Grandson District until it was dissolved on 31 August 2006, and Mauborget became part of the new district of Jura-Nord Vaudois.

The municipality is located between Chasseron mountain and Mont Aubert, on the road between Grandson to Môtiers. It is the highest village of the Vaudois Jura, with an elevation of 1,170 m (3,840 ft).

== Coat of arms ==
The blazon of the municipal coat of arms is Pally of Six Argent and Azure, overall a Bend semi-raguly Gules.

== Demographics ==
Mauborget has a population (as of December 2020) of 127. As of 2008, 9.7% of the population are resident foreign nationals. Over the last 10 years (1999–2009) the population has changed at a rate of -1.2%. It has changed at a rate of -9.4% due to migration and at a rate of 8.2% due to births and deaths.

Most of the population (as of 2000) speaks French (79 or 92.9%), with German being second most common (4 or 4.7%) and English being third (1 or 1.2%).

Of the population in the municipality 23 or about 27.1% were born in Mauborget and lived there in 2000. There were 32 or 37.6% who were born in the same canton, while 21 or 24.7% were born somewhere else in Switzerland, and 8 or 9.4% were born outside of Switzerland.

In 2008 there was 1 live birth to Swiss citizens and 1 birth to non-Swiss citizens, and in same time span there was 1 death of a Swiss citizen. Ignoring immigration and emigration, the population of Swiss citizens remained the same while the foreign population increased by 1. The total Swiss population change in 2008 (from all sources, including moves across municipal borders) was an increase of 4 and the non-Swiss population remained the same. This represents a population growth rate of 4.5%.

The age distribution, as of 2009, in Mauborget is; 7 children or 8.3% of the population are between 0 and 9 years old and 11 teenagers or 13.1% are between 10 and 19. Of the adult population, 2 people or 2.4% of the population are between 20 and 29 years old. 8 people or 9.5% are between 30 and 39, 13 people or 15.5% are between 40 and 49, and 12 people or 14.3% are between 50 and 59. The senior population distribution is 18 people or 21.4% of the population are between 60 and 69 years old, 11 people or 13.1% are between 70 and 79, there are 2 people or 2.4% who are between 80 and 89.

As of 2000, there were 24 people who were single and never married in the municipality. There were 50 married individuals, 6 widows or widowers and 5 individuals who are divorced.

As of 2000, there were 37 private households in the municipality, and an average of 2.2 persons per household. There were 14 households that consist of only one person and 3 households with five or more people. Out of a total of 40 households that answered this question, 35.0% were households made up of just one person. Of the rest of the households, there are 12 married couples without children, 11 married couples with children

In 2000 there were 66 single-family homes (or 79.5% of the total) out of a total of 83 inhabited buildings. There were 4 multi-family buildings (4.8%), along with 12 multi-purpose buildings that were mostly used for housing (14.5%) and 1 other use buildings (commercial or industrial) that also had some housing (1.2%). Of the single-family homes 4 were built before 1919, while 7 were built between 1990 and 2000. The greatest number of single-family homes (22) were built between 1946 and 1960. The most multi-family homes (2) were built between 1946 and 1960 and the next most (1) were built before 1919.

In 2000 there were 88 apartments in the municipality. The most common apartment size was 4 rooms of which there were 32. There were 2 single-room apartments and 23 apartments with five or more rooms. Of these apartments, a total of 37 apartments (42.0% of the total) were permanently occupied, while 45 apartments (51.1%) were seasonally occupied and 6 apartments (6.8%) were empty. As of 2009, the construction rate of new housing units was 0 new units per 1000 residents. The vacancy rate for the municipality, in 2010, was 2.17%.

The historical population is given in the following chart:

== Politics ==
In the 2007 federal election the most popular party was the SVP which received 42.29% of the vote. The next three most popular parties were the Green Party (16.06%), the LPS Party (9.86%) and the FDP (9.7%). In the federal election, a total of 35 votes were cast, and the voter turnout was 53.0%.

== Economy ==
As of 2010, Mauborget had an unemployment rate of 9.2%. As of 2008, there were 15 people employed in the primary economic sector and about 5 businesses involved in this sector. No one was employed in the secondary sector. 6 people were employed in the tertiary sector, with 2 businesses in this sector. There were 46 residents of the municipality who were employed in some capacity, of which females made up 37.0% of the workforce.

In 2008 the total number of full-time equivalent jobs was 12. The number of jobs in the primary sector was 9, all of which were in agriculture. There were no jobs in the secondary sector. The number of jobs in the tertiary sector was 3, all of which were in a hotel or restaurant.

In 2000, there were 25 workers who commuted away from the municipality. Of the working population, 6.5% used public transportation to get to work, and 47.8% used a private car.

== Religion ==
From the 2000 census, 18 or 21.2% were Roman Catholic, while 44 or 51.8% belonged to the Swiss Reformed Church. Of the rest of the population, there was 1 member of an Orthodox church, there were 2 individuals (or about 2.35% of the population) who belonged to the Christian Catholic Church. There were 2 (or about 2.35% of the population) who were Islamic. 16 (or about 18.82% of the population) belonged to no church, are agnostic or atheist, and 2 individuals (or about 2.35% of the population) did not answer the question.

== Education ==
In Mauborget about 36 or (42.4%) of the population have completed non-mandatory upper secondary education, and 13 or (15.3%) have completed additional higher education (either university or a Fachhochschule). Of the 13 who completed tertiary schooling, 61.5% were Swiss men, 38.5% were Swiss women.

In the 2009/2010 school year there were a total of 11 students in the Mauborget school district. In the Vaud cantonal school system, two years of non-obligatory pre-school are provided by the political districts. During the school year, the political district provided pre-school care for a total of 578 children of which 359 children (62.1%) received subsidized pre-school care. The canton's primary school program requires students to attend for four years. There were 4 students in the municipal primary school program. The obligatory lower secondary school program lasts for six years and there were 7 students in those schools.

As of 2000, there were 8 students from Mauborget who attended schools outside the municipality.

== Roses ==
Mauborget features in the story of the discovery of the dwarf rose breeding stock.
