= Fontanezier =

- Former municipality
- Flag Coat of arms
- Location of Fontanezier
- Location within Switzerland Location within Canton of Vaud
- Coordinates: 46°51′N 06°39′E
- Country: Switzerland
- Canton: Vaud
- District: Jura-Nord Vaudois

Government
  - Mayor: Dominique Duvoisin

Area
  - Total: 3.74 km^{2} (1.44 sq mi)
- Elevation: 823 m (2,700 ft)

Population (2009)
  - Total: 58
  - Density: 16/km^{2} (40/sq mi)
- Demonym: Lè Motsettî
- Time zone: UTC+01:00 (CET)
  - Summer (DST): UTC+02:00 (CEST)
- Postal code: 1423
- SFOS number: 5558
- ISO 3166 code: CH-VD
- Surrounded by: Provence, Bonvillars, Champagne, Romairon
- Website: Profile (in French), SFSO statistics

Fontanezier is a former municipality in the district of Jura-Nord Vaudois in the canton of Vaud in Switzerland.

The municipalities of Fontanezier, Romairon, Vaugondry and Villars-Burquin merged on 1 July 2011 into the new municipality of Tévenon.

== History ==
Fontanezier is first mentioned in 1403 as Fontanisy.

== Geography ==
Fontanezier has an area, as of 2009, of 3.74 square kilometers (1.44 sq mi). Of this area, 1.82 km^{2} (0.70 sq mi) or 48.7% is used for agricultural purposes, while 1.86 km^{2} (0.72 sq mi) or 49.7% is forested. Of the rest of the land, 0.09 km^{2} (22 acres) or 2.4% is settled (buildings or roads).

Of the built up area, housing and buildings made up 1.6% and transportation infrastructure made up 0.8%. Out of the forested land, 42.8% of the total land area is heavily forested and 7.0% is covered with orchards or small clusters of trees. Of the agricultural land, 13.6% is used for growing crops and 17.9% is pastures and 16.6% is used for alpine pastures.

The municipality was part of the Grandson District until it was dissolved on 31 August 2006, and Fontanezier became part of the new district of Jura-Nord Vaudois.

The municipality is located in the foothills of the Jura Mountains. It consists of the village of Fontanezier at an elevation of 825 m (2,707 ft) and the hamlet of Le Crozat (at 1,364 m (4,475 ft)).

== Coat of arms ==
The blazon of the municipal coat of arms is Paly of six Argent and Azure, on a bend Gules three Buckles Or.

== Demographics ==
Fontanezier has a population (as of 2009) of 58. As of 2008, 1.6% of the population are resident foreign nationals. Over the last 10 years (1999–2009 ) the population has changed at a rate of -17.1%. It has changed at a rate of -10% due to migration and at a rate of -7.1% due to births and deaths.

Most of the population (as of 2000) speaks French (62 or 88.6%), with German being second most common (7 or 10.0%) and Portuguese being third (1 or 1.4%).

Of the population in the municipality 28 or about 40.0% were born in Fontanezier and lived there in 2000. There were 17 or 24.3% who were born in the same canton, while 19 or 27.1% were born somewhere else in Switzerland, and 6 or 8.6% were born outside of Switzerland.

In 2008 there were live births to Swiss citizens and 1 death of a Swiss citizen. Ignoring immigration and emigration, the population of Swiss citizens decreased by 1 while the foreign population remained the same. The total Swiss population remained the same in 2008 and the non-Swiss population remained the same. This represents a population growth rate of 0.0%.

The age distribution, as of 2009, in Fontanezier is; 2 children or 3.4% of the population are between 0 and 9 years old and 8 teenagers or 13.8% are between 10 and 19. Of the adult population, 7 people or 12.1% of the population are between 20 and 29 years old. 6 people or 10.3% are between 30 and 39, 7 people or 12.1% are between 40 and 49, and 7 people or 12.1% are between 50 and 59. The senior population distribution is 10 people or 17.2% of the population are between 60 and 69 years old, 6 people or 10.3% are between 70 and 79, there are 3 people or 5.2% who are between 80 and 89, and there are 2 people or 3.4% who are 90 and older.

As of 2000, there were 28 people who were single and never married in the municipality. There were 35 married individuals, 2 widows or widowers and 5 individuals who are divorced.

As of 2000 the average number of residents per living room was 0.59 which is about equal to the cantonal average of 0.61 per room. In this case, a room is defined as space of a housing unit of at least 4 m^{2} (43 sq ft) as normal bedrooms, dining rooms, living rooms, kitchens and habitable cellars and attics. About 80.8% of the total households were owner occupied, or in other words did not pay rent (though they may have a mortgage or a rent-to-own agreement).

As of 2000, there were 26 private households in the municipality, and an average of 2.7 persons per household. There were 3 households that consist of only one person and 2 households with five or more people. Out of a total of 27 households that answered this question, 11.1% were households made up of just one person and there was 1 adult who lived with their parents. Of the rest of the households, there are 11 married couples without children, 8 married couples with children There were 2 single parents with a child or children. There was 1 household that was made up of unrelated people and 1 household that was made up of some sort of institution or another collective housing.

In 2000 there were 19 single family homes (or 61.3% of the total) out of a total of 31 inhabited buildings. There were 1 multi-family buildings (3.2%), along with 9 multi-purpose buildings that were mostly used for housing (29.0%) and 2 other use buildings (commercial or industrial) that also had some housing (6.5%). Of the single family homes 11 were built before 1919. The most multi-family homes (1) were built before 1919.

In 2000 there were 34 apartments in the municipality. The most common apartment size was 3 rooms of which there were 9. There were 2 single room apartments and 12 apartments with five or more rooms. Of these apartments, a total of 26 apartments (76.5% of the total) were permanently occupied, while 6 apartments (17.6%) were seasonally occupied and 2 apartments (5.9%) were empty. As of 2009, the construction rate of new housing units was 0 new units per 1000 residents. The vacancy rate for the municipality, in 2010, was 0%.

The historical population is given in the following chart:

== Politics ==
In the 2007 federal election the most popular party was the SVP which received 39.29% of the vote. The next three most popular parties were the SP (23.46%), the Green Party (21.23%) and the FDP (5.96%). In the federal election, a total of 30 votes were cast, and the voter turnout was 57.7%.

== Economy ==
As of 2010, Fontanezier had an unemployment rate of 0%. As of 2008, there were 6 people employed in the primary economic sector and about 2 businesses involved in this sector. No one was employed in the secondary sector or the tertiary sector. There were 32 residents of the municipality who were employed in some capacity, of which females made up 43.8% of the workforce.

In 2008 the total number of full-time equivalent jobs was 5, all of which were in agriculture.

In 2000, there were 23 workers who commuted away from the municipality. Of the working population, 25% used public transportation to get to work, and 56.3% used a private car.

== Religion ==
From the 2000 census, 4 or 5.7% were Roman Catholic, while 51 or 72.9% belonged to the Swiss Reformed Church. Of the rest of the population, there was 1 member of an Orthodox church. There was 1 individual who was Islamic. 12 (or about 17.14% of the population) belonged to no church, are agnostic or atheist, and 1 individual (or about 1.43% of the population) did not answer the question.

== Education ==
In Fontanezier about 20 or (28.6%) of the population have completed non-mandatory upper secondary education, and 11 or (15.7%) have completed additional higher education (either University or a Fachhochschule). Of the 11 who completed tertiary schooling, 72.7% were Swiss men, 27.3% were Swiss women.

In the 2009/2010 school year there were a total of 5 students in the Fontanezier school district. In the Vaud cantonal school system, two years of non-obligatory pre-school are provided by the political districts. During the school year, the political district provided pre-school care for a total of 578 children of which 359 children (62.1%) received subsidized pre-school care. The canton's primary school program requires students to attend for four years. There were 2 students in the municipal primary school program. The obligatory lower secondary school program lasts for six years and there were 3 students in those schools.

As of 2000, there were 11 students from Fontanezier who attended schools outside the municipality.
