= Grandson Castle =

Castle in Grandson, Switzerland

- Château de Grandson
- Grandson
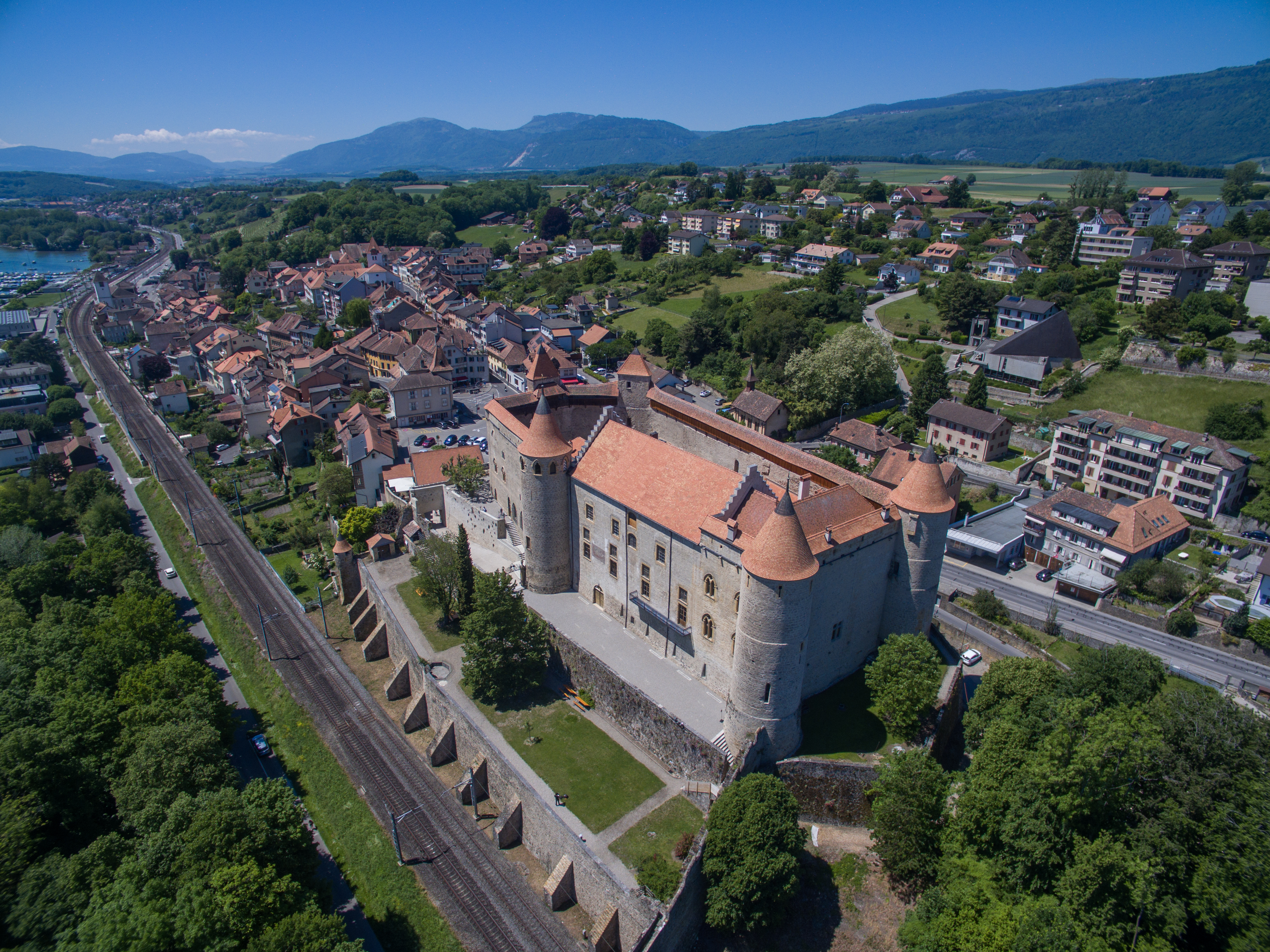

Site information
- Code: CH-VD
- Condition: Renovated

Location
- Coordinates: 46°48′32″N 6°38′46″E
- Height: 447 m above the sea

Site history
- Built: 1050-1100

Swiss Cultural Property of National Significance

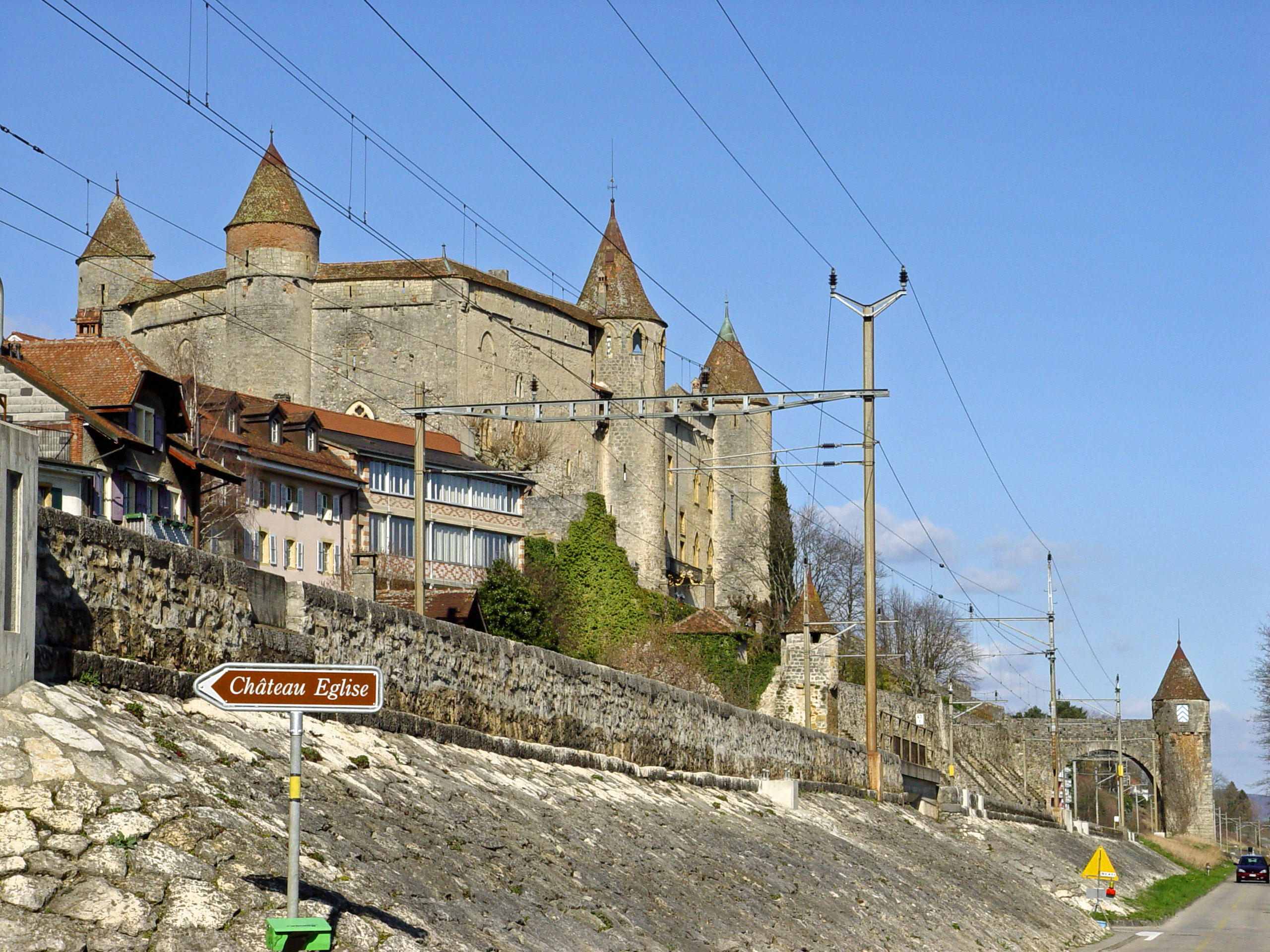
Grandson Castle

Grandson Castle (French: Château de Grandson) is a medieval castle in the Swiss municipality of Grandson in the canton of Vaud. It is a Swiss heritage site of national significance.

== History ==
The Lords of Grandson were first mentioned in the second half of the 11th century, when the castle was built. It was sited on the shore of Lake Neuchâtel to control the coast road. The House of Grandson sired a number of powerful scions, including bishops of Basel, Lausanne, Toul and Verdun Over the following century, as the Lords of Grandson expanded their power, they often came into conflict with the nearby monastery of Romainmôtier.

In the 13th century the castle was rebuilt by Otto I of Grandson. Otto I is the most famous of the Lords of Grandson. He was a close friend of Prince Edward of England and accompanied him in 1271 on the Crusades to the Holy Land. He participated on the side of the English king in the conquest of Wales in 1283. In 1291 he commanded the Crusader army that unsuccessfully attacked Acre. In 1313 he defeated the rebellious city of Lausanne, which had risen up against the bishop. In addition to being a military leader, he was a skilled diplomat and had the confidence of the Pope, the Emperor and the French and English kings. After he died in 1328, Otto's brother William moved to England, where he was also successful and was the founder of the line of the Lords of Grandisson. His son was John Grandisson, the Bishop of Exeter.

The main line of the House of Grandson remained close to the House of Savoy and possessed the confidence of the Count. At the end of the 14th century the Lords of Grandson began to decline. Hugo of Grandson was sentenced to death for allegedly forging documents, but fled to England, where he mysteriously died. Otto III was accused of having killed Amadeus VII, Count of Savoy, in a fight. In Bourg-en-Bresse in 1397 he agreed to a judicial duel to prove his innocence. He was beaten by his opponent, Gerhard von Estavayer. John II of Grandson was convicted of forgery and sedition against the Duke of Burgundy and sentenced to death by suffocation. When John II died, the power of the family died with him. The estate was confiscated and given to Margaret of Mümpelgard. Thereafter, there were several changes of ownership.

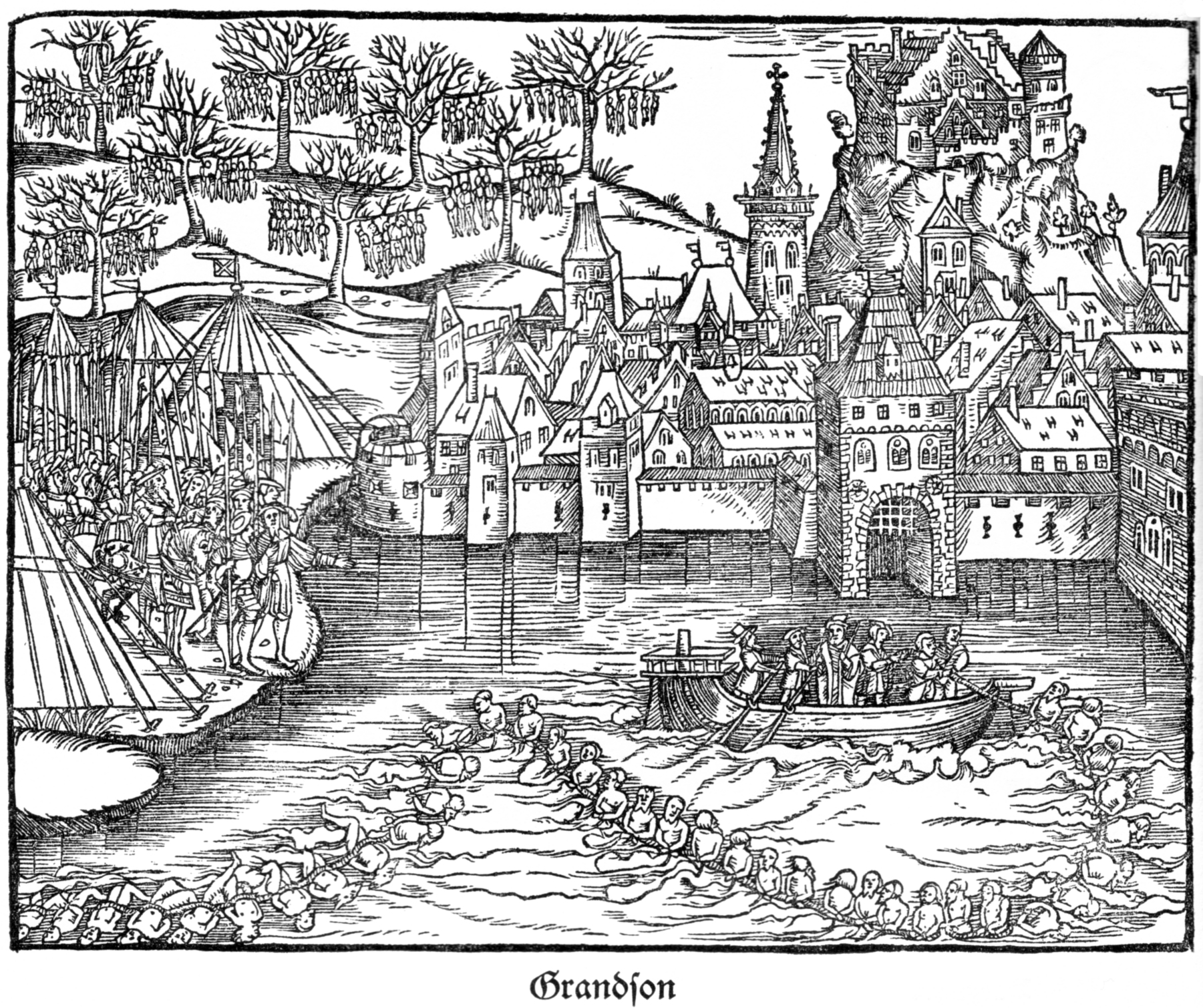
The siege of Grandson and the execution of the garrison, illustration by Johann Stumpf

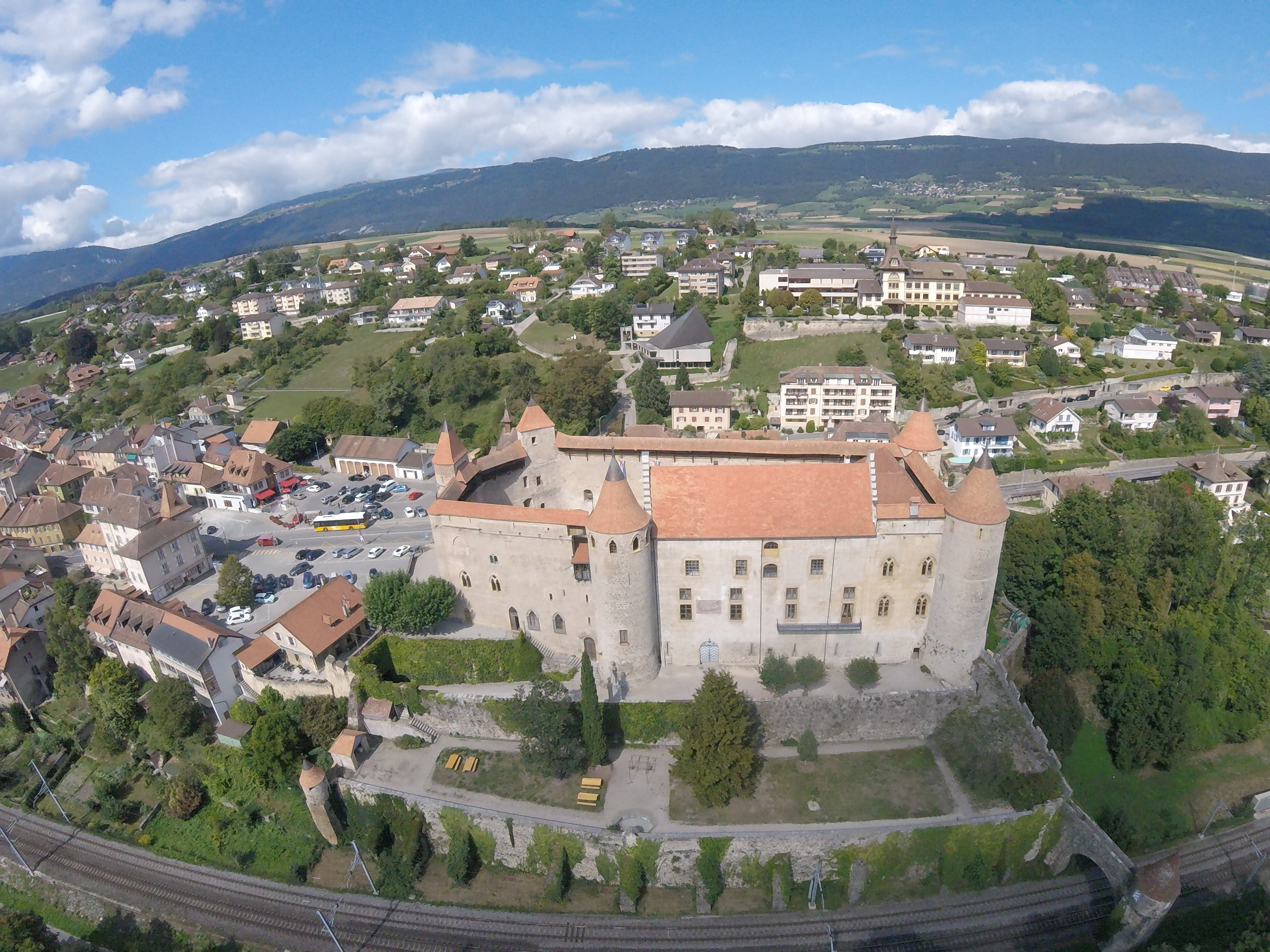
Grandson Castle, aerial photo

In the late 15th century, Grandson Castle belonged to Jacques de Savoie, an ally of Charles the Bold. In 1475 the castle was taken by the Swiss Confederation. In late February 1476, Charles the Bold brought a large mercenary army with him together with many heavy cannons. When the garrison chose to surrender to Charles, they were all executed by hanging or drowning.

Unaware of the execution of their countrymen, the Swiss Confederation sent an army to lift the siege of the castle. On 2 March 1476 the Swiss army approached the forces of Charles near the town of Concise. They surprised Charles' army and routed them in a short battle. While very few of Charles' soldiers were killed, the Swiss had humiliated the greatest duke in Europe, defeated one of the most feared armies, and taken a most impressive amount of treasure. What is probably a small surviving part of this fantastic booty is on display in various Swiss museums today, whilst a few remaining artillery pieces can be seen in the museum of La Neuveville, near Neuchâtel, Switzerland.

The castle was used as a seat of the bailiff until 1798 and then went over to the private sector.

Today the Château de Grandson survives as one of the best-preserved medieval fortresses in Switzerland. Only the dungeon has disappeared, probably destroyed during the construction of the castle's western section. Traces of the dungeon-tower can still be picked out on the northern side.

In 1875, the level of Lake Neuchâtel was lowered as part of a series of projects to reduce flood-risk in the area, so that the château is now some distance from the lake alongside which it was originally sited, and no longer enjoys the "natural protection" on its south-eastern side which the lake once afforded.

== See also ==
- List of castles in Switzerland
- Battle of Grandson

== Bibliography ==
- Marshall, John (2025). Othon de Grandson: Edward I’s Loyal Knight of Renown. Barnsley: Pen and Sword Books. ISBN 9781399039628
- Marshall, John (2022). Welsh Castle Builders. Barnsley: Pen and Sword Books. ISBN 978-1-39908-549-6.
- Ray, Michael. 2006. The Savoyard Cousins: A Comparison of the Careers and Relative Success of the Grandson (Grandison) and Champvent (Chavent) Families in England. The Antiquaries Journal 86
