= Grandson District =

Coordinates: 46°48′N 6°38′E

Grandson District District de Grandson
- District
- Flag Coat of arms

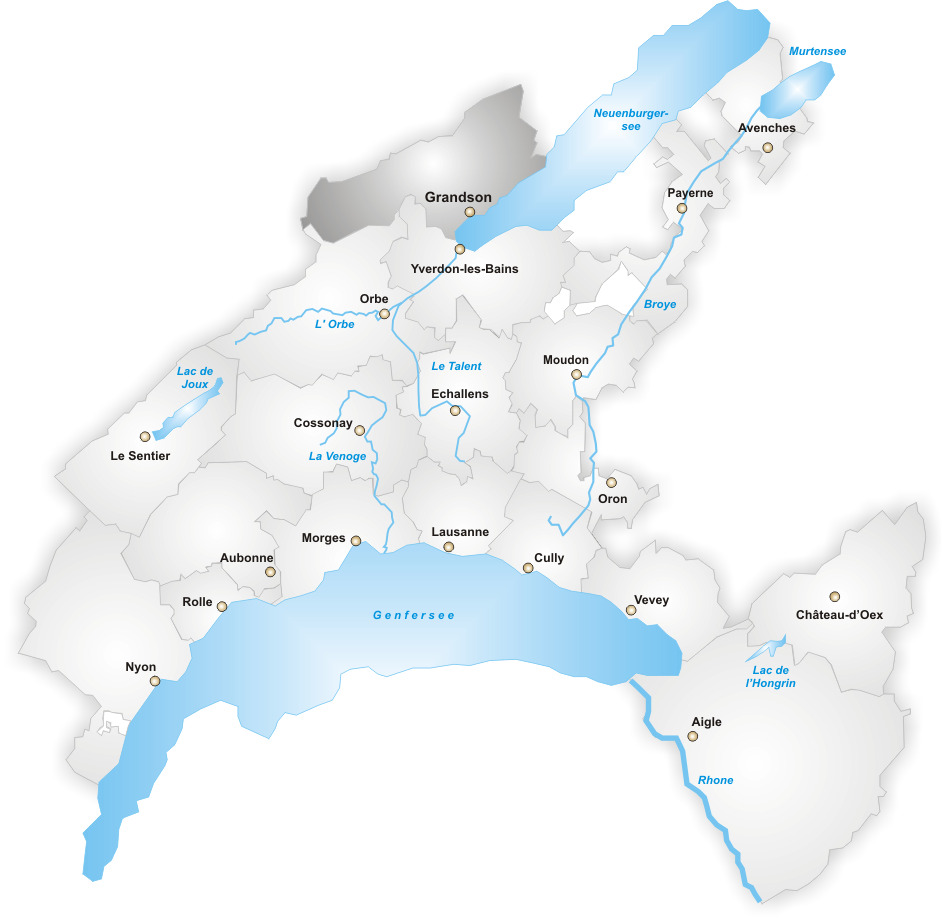
- Country: Switzerland
- Canton: Vaud
- Capital: Grandson

Area
  - Total: 175.97 km^{2} (67.94 sq mi)

Population (2006)
  - Total: 12,658
  - Density: 71.933/km^{2} (186.30/sq mi)
- Time zone: UTC+1 (CET)
  - Summer (DST): UTC+2 (CEST)
- Municipalities: 20

Grandson was a district of the Canton of Vaud in Switzerland. The seat of the district was the town of Grandson.

On 1 September 2006 the district was dissolved and all the municipalities joined the new Jura-North Vaudois District (French: District du Jura-Nord vaudois).

== Municipalities ==
- Bonvillars
- Bullet
- Champagne
- Concise
- Corcelles-près-Concise
- Fiez
- Fontaines-sur-Grandson
- Fontanezier
- Giez
- Grandevent
- Grandson
- Mauborget
- Mutrux
- Novalles
- Onnens
- Provence
- Romairon
- Sainte-Croix
- Vaugondry
- Villars-Burquin
