= Grandson, Switzerland =

Grandson
- Municipality
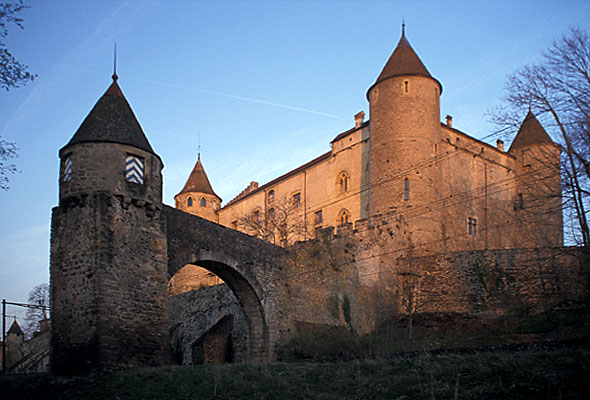
- Grandson castle

- Flag Coat of arms
- Location of Grandson
- Location within Switzerland Location within Canton of Vaud
- Coordinates: 46°49′N 06°39′E
- Country: Switzerland
- Canton: Vaud
- District: Jura-Nord Vaudois

Government
  - Mayor: Syndic

Area
  - Total: 7.86 km^{2} (3.03 sq mi)
- Elevation: 447 m (1,467 ft)

Population (2009)
  - Total: 3,040
  - Density: 387/km^{2} (1,000/sq mi)
- Demonyms: Les Gransonnois; Les Bocans
- Time zone: UTC+01:00 (CET)
  - Summer (DST): UTC+02:00 (CEST)
- Postal code: 1422
- SFOS number: 5561
- ISO 3166 code: CH-VD
- Localities: Corcelettes, Les Tuileries-de-Grandson, Péroset, La Poissine, Bru, La Perraudettaz
- Surrounded by: Champagne, Bonvillars, Montagny-près-Yverdon, Valeyres-sous-Montagny, Giez, Fiez
- Website: grandson.ch

Grandson (French: [ɡʀɑ̃sɔ̃]) is a municipality in the district of Jura-Nord Vaudois in the canton of Vaud in Switzerland. It is situated on the south-west tip of Lake Neuchâtel, about 25 km (16 mi) north of Lausanne. It was part of the Kingdom of Upper Burgundy until the death of Rudolph III of Burgundy (993–1032), also King of Lower Burgundy, the last in the male line, when it was united with the Holy Roman Empire. On 2 March 1476, during the Burgundian Wars, Charles the Bold was defeated here in the Battle of Grandson.

== History ==
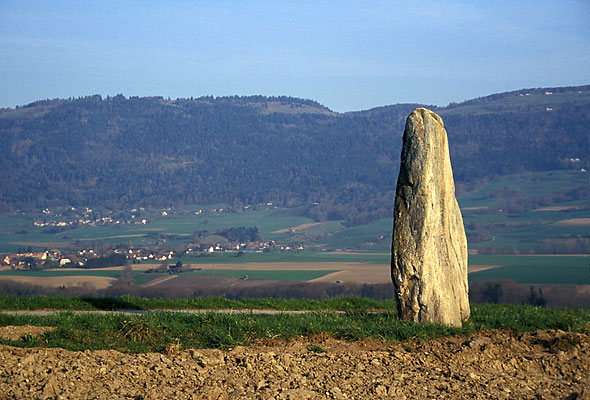
Menhir near Grandson, found buried underground and erected above the spot in 1895

The Grandson family is first mentioned in the second half of the 11th century as Grancione. The town was first mentioned around 1100 as de castro Grancione. Around 1126 it was mentioned as castri Grandissoni and in 1154 it was called apud Grantionem.

=== Prehistoric settlements ===
In May 1895 a farmer discovered a buried underground menhir weighing about three tons and about 3.4 m (11 ft) tall in Les Echâtelards. The monolith now stands in the vicinity of the discovery site. Grandson, however, is better known for its prehistoric lakeside settlements. The site at Corcelettes became well known after 1854, when Frederic Louis Troyon introduced the author Ferdinand Keller to the Corcelettes site in which numerous piles for stilt houses—as well as vases—were found. By 1930, seven lake front settlements were identified. They included: in Corcelettes a large Bronze Age site and a smaller one from the Neolithic period, in Les Buttes two more from the Neolithic period, and in Le Repuis, Le Stand and Les Tuileries three others that were probably from the Neolithic period. At the last three sites, no artifacts were discovered that could be used to definitively date them. In 1995 at the Bellerive campsite, a Late Neolithic settlement dating from 2741 to 2488 BC was discovered.

The most important stilt house settlement is at Corcelettes. The first Jura water correction of 1876 led to the drainage of a large part of the marshy field where the prehistoric village had been. The Federal Archaeology and History Museum in Lausanne seized the opportunity and started excavations in the following year which dragged on until 1880. Corcelettes is probably the one Swiss village that supplied the most metal objects from the Bronze Age to different museums and private collections around the world. In 1881, the stilt field was 300 by 100 to 200 metres (980 by 330 to 660 ft) in size. In 1900 it was declared a Swiss heritage site of national significance. While it legally protected from looting, several thousand square meters of archaeologically important material has been lost due to erosion. Nevertheless, Corcelettes is one of the best preserved and largest lakeside settlements on Lake Neuchâtel.

In 1983 a system of trenches and banks were built to protect the site from weathering. Between 1983 and 1988 approximately 2,000 wood pieces, of which 14 were from the period 1123-878 BC, were recorded and measured. Several investigations of the, up to 0.6 m (2.0 ft) thick, artifact layers have found—not only pottery and some bronze objects, but also organic material (threads, bark, wood, leaves, seeds, etc.) and burnt traces of house walls of wattle.

The findings from Corcelettes spread over the whole Bronze Age, but with a clear accumulation at the end of this period in the 9th century BC. The pottery is often decorated with paintings, tin bands or white incrustation. Some of the objects include; a small pig sculpture, a coil and terracotta horns, a flute and two sickle wooden handles, horse bits, three bronze vessels (including a basin in a northern Europe style), a broken brooch, a wheel made of ash wood, wheat bread, a bone plate made from pieces of about fifteen human skulls and a dugout canoe made of wood. A copper bar, hammer, small tools and molds indicate that there was a metal processing and manufacturing shop in the village.

It appears that the village had declined by the Iron Age. The only Iron Age object was a Certosa type brooch. From the Roman era only a few bricks and walls have been discovered in the area of the municipality.

=== Medieval Grandson ===
The development of Grandson town is closely tied to the castle and its owner, the lords of Grandson. The family came to power around 1000. The small settlement is first mentioned around 1100, but is certainly older than that. The name of the ruling family is recorded as Grancione in the 11th century; the castle as castr[um] Grancione in 1100, the settlement as apud Grantionem in 1154.

Either by 1146 or at least before 1178 the Grandson family supported the foundation of the Benedictine Priory of Saint-Jean, which belonged to the Abbey of La Chaise-Dieu in Auvergne. The family gave the church of Saint-Jean-Baptiste to the priory. At the same time, they rebuilt the church, with monolithic columns topped with Roman capitals. The choir was enlarged between 1300 and 1308 and was damaged in a fire in 1378. It was part of the parish of Giez until 1438 when the priory's church received the rights of a parish church.

By 1300, the entire town, except on the lake side, was surrounded by walls. The nearby villages of Provence, Bonvillars, Fiez, Concise and Yvonand were responsible for the maintenance of the walls. Otto I of Grandson rebuilt the old castle and enlarged it in 1277–1281. The castle was expanded again in the beginning of the 14th century. Otto de Grandson, also spelled Otton, Othon or Otho (c. 1238–1328), was the most prominent of the Savoyard knights in the service of King Edward I of England.

A large fire (probably in 1378, but first documented in 1397) destroyed the castle roof and a large portion of the courtyard. A Bürgergemeinde is first mentioned in 1293, and before 1328 Otto I granted a charter to the town. On the north side of the church, a covered market was built. In the village of Le Revelin, outside the city walls and close to the Giez gate, butcher shops opened. Otto I promoted the mendicant orders and allowed the Franciscans to build a monastery at the western entrance of the town in 1289. Today only the church tower and some remains of the convent building are visible. A hospital was built in the second half of the 14th century in today's Rue Basse, near the Gey gate tower, which was destroyed in 1837. In 1420 the hospital came under the auspices of the town of Grandson.

=== Battle of Grandson ===
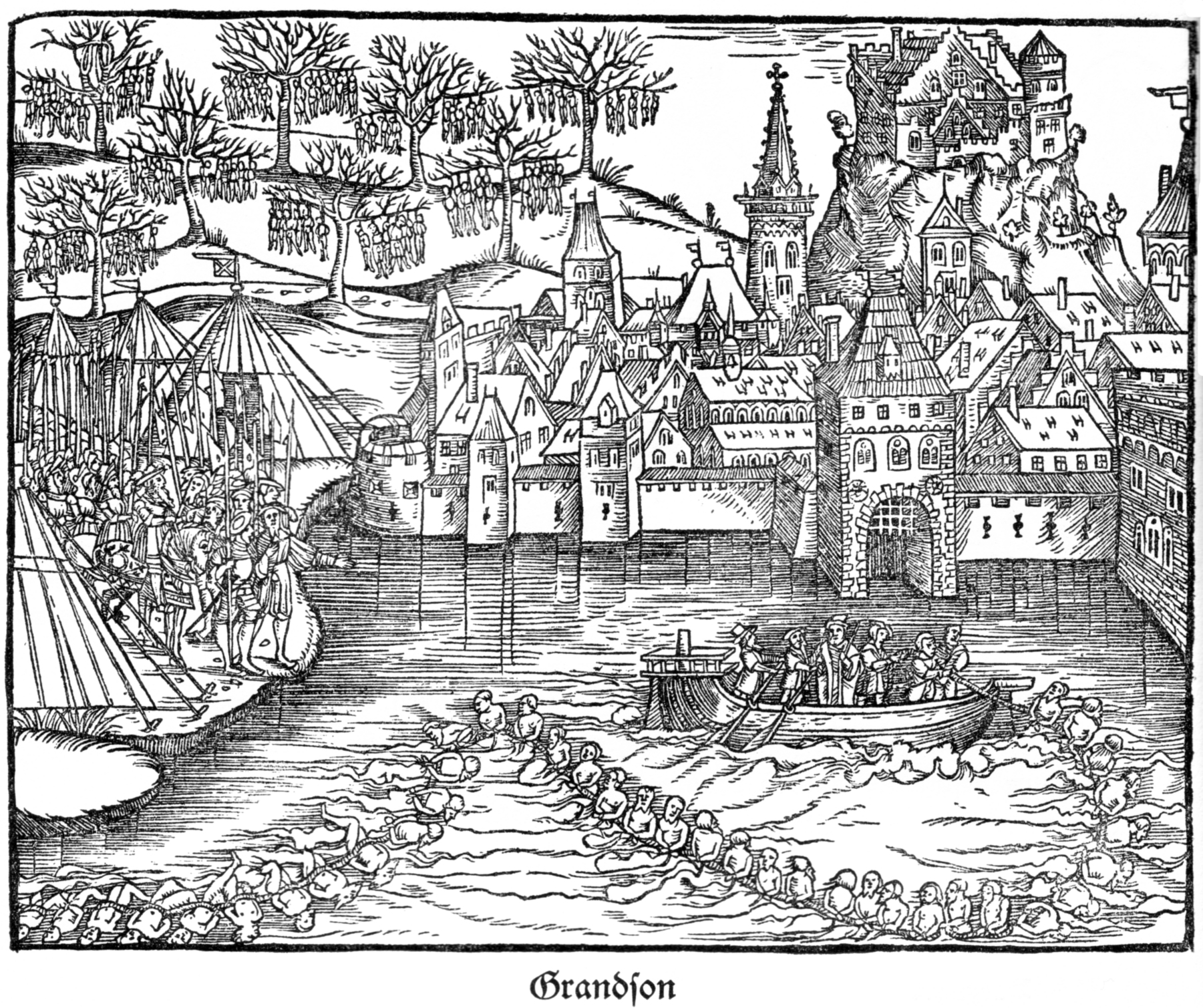
The siege of Grandson and the execution of the garrison, illustration by Johann Stumpf

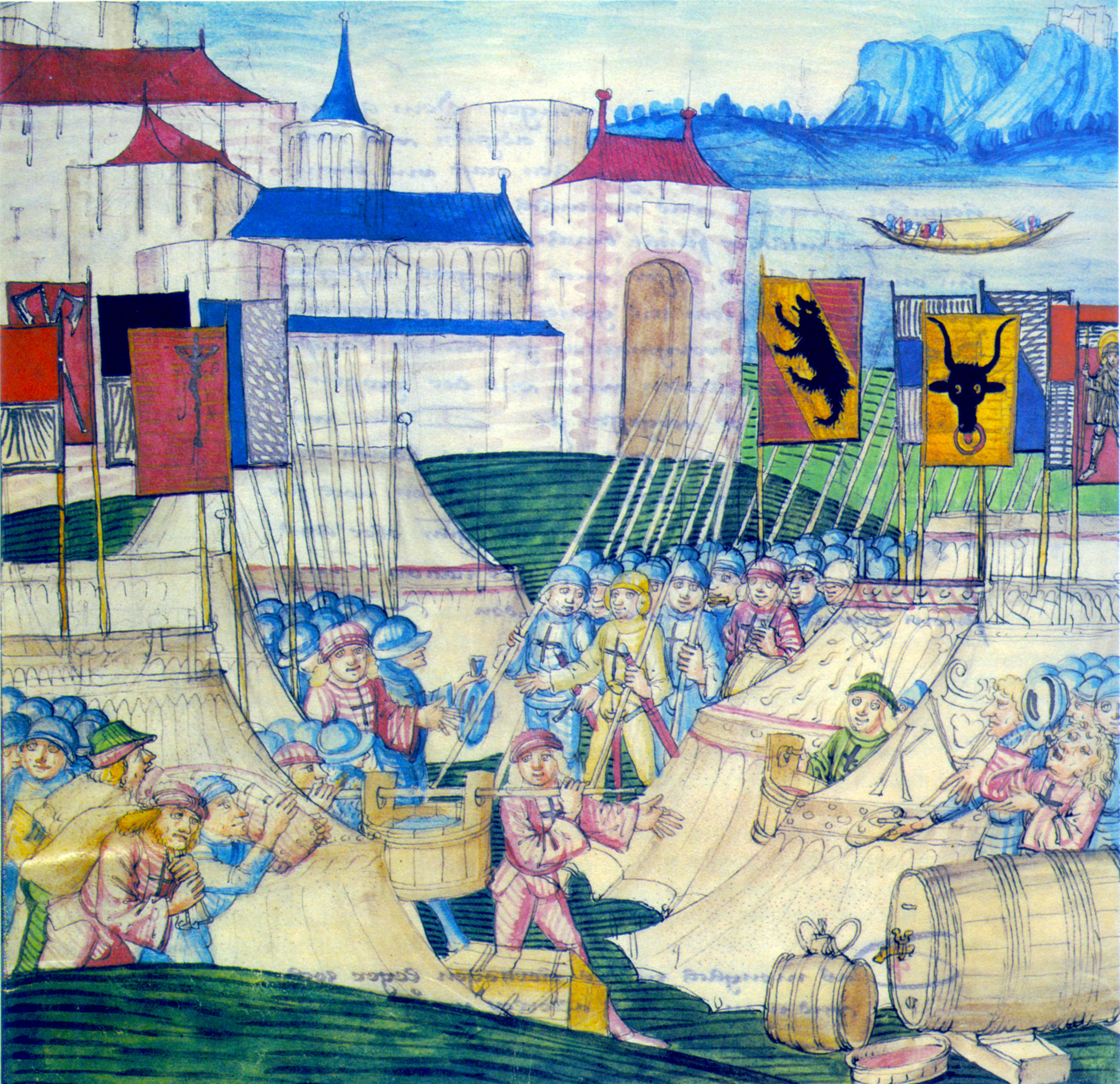
Pillage of the Burgundian camp after the battle of Grandson, illustration by Diebold Schilling the Elder, 1483

In the late 15th century, Grandson castle belonged to Jacques de Savoie, an ally of Charles the Bold. In 1475 the castle was taken by the Swiss Confederation. In late February 1476, Charles the Bold brought up a large mercenary army to retake the castle. Uncertain of relief, the garrison decided to surrender.

Swiss sources are unanimous in stating that the men only gave up when Charles assured them they would be spared. Instead, he ordered all 412 men of the garrison to be executed.

On 2 March 1476 the Swiss relief army approached the forces of Charles near the town of Concise. Poor reconnaissance left Charles uninformed as to the size and deployment of the Swiss, and he believed that the Swiss vanguard was the entire force sent against him. When the main body of the Swiss emerged from a forest, the Burgundian army, already pulling back, became confused. The withdrawal soon turned into a rout when the Burgundian army broke ranks and ran.

Few casualties were suffered on either side: the Swiss did not have the cavalry necessary to chase the Burgundians far. At insignificant cost to themselves, the Swiss had humiliated the greatest duke in Europe, defeated one of the most feared armies, and taken a most impressive amount of treasure. After the battle, the Swiss troops came upon the bodies of their countrymen still hanging from trees. Rather than demoralizing them, it united them as never before.

=== Early modern period ===
After the Burgundian Wars, Grandson became a condominium of Bern and Fribourg. The bailiwick (Vogtei) of Grandson was established, including most of the territory of the modern Grandson District (excepting Sainte-Croix and Bullet, but including Montagny, Villars-sous-Champvent, Essert-sous-Champvent, Chamblon and Yvonand). The town was administered by a 24-member council, with the first 12 forming a court.

The forerunners of the Protestant Reformation in Grandson included the coup of Guillaume Farel, who had destroyed the altars of the Franciscan church in 1531, and the sermons of the French priest Jean Le Comte. However, it was not until 1554 that the full Reformation spread from Bern to Grandson. The monastery and property of the Franciscans were divided between Grandson and the cities of Bern and Fribourg. After the secularization the cloister housed a cemetery until the beginning of the 19th. The buildings of the Priory of Saint-Jean became the City Hall and school buildings.

=== Modern municipality ===
Aerial view by Walter Mittelholzer (1919)

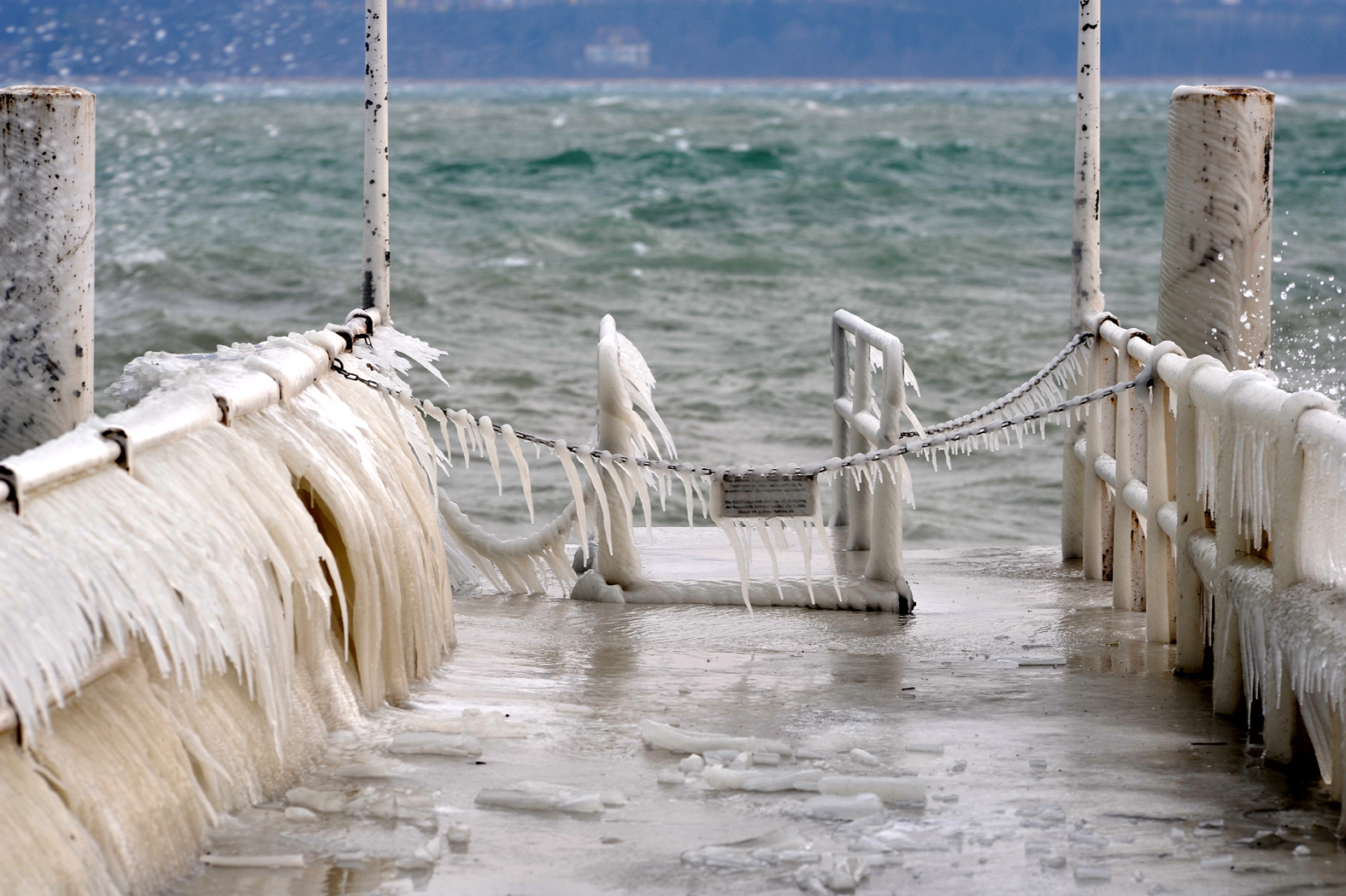
Part of the harbor of Grandson

The modern municipality was established in 1798, as administrative center of Grandson District. It was part of the canton of Léman until 1803.

In the 19th century major construction projects changed the town and the immediate surroundings. In 1819, the Franciscan church and the cemetery were moved to Les Collombaires to allow an extension of the Rue Basse to the main road. In 1890 the foundations of the church were destroyed to allow the creation of a plaza in front of city hall. In 1858, the city was separated from the lake by a dam which was built for the Yverdon-Biel railway line. The lake's water level fell in 1879 with the Jura water correction. The medieval harbor at the west entrance to the town, no longer connected to the lake. At the end of the 19th century, new docks were built along with magnificent houses on the new bank including the estate and astronomic observatory of the Vautier family. The expansion of the main road and their connection with the surrounding road network led to the 1848-55 straightening and widening of the Rue Basse which forced about thirty houses to move back. On the Palace Square, one of the most remarkable churches of the Evangelical Free Church of the Canton of Vaud was consecrated in 1898.

The income of the residents of Grandson came from agriculture, particularly from livestock raising on slopes of the Jura Mountains, but also from fishing. The wine production was widespread in the late 19th century but decreased significantly with the emergence of parasitic diseases. The major industry in the 19th century was tobacco processing. The main tobacco procession company was Vos, Decoppet. & Cie., which was headquartered in the castle. In 1831, it was taken over by the H. Vautier & Cie. company. The wealthy Vautier family were closely involved in local politics and between 1899 and 1914, they held the mayor's office. Their factory at the west entrance of the city was closed in 1972. In addition, there were various companies in the construction industry (Herren Frères & Cie., Beati Frères SA), Transport, Civil engineering (1896 Landi, 1920 Cand, merged in 1974 into Cand-Landi SA) and construction materials (Les Sables La Poissine Graviers & SA) in town. The automotive prototyping company Ateliers d'études de construction automobile Sàrl is headquartered in Grandson.

Grandson was joined to the newly formed Jura-Nord vaudois District in 2006.

== Geography ==
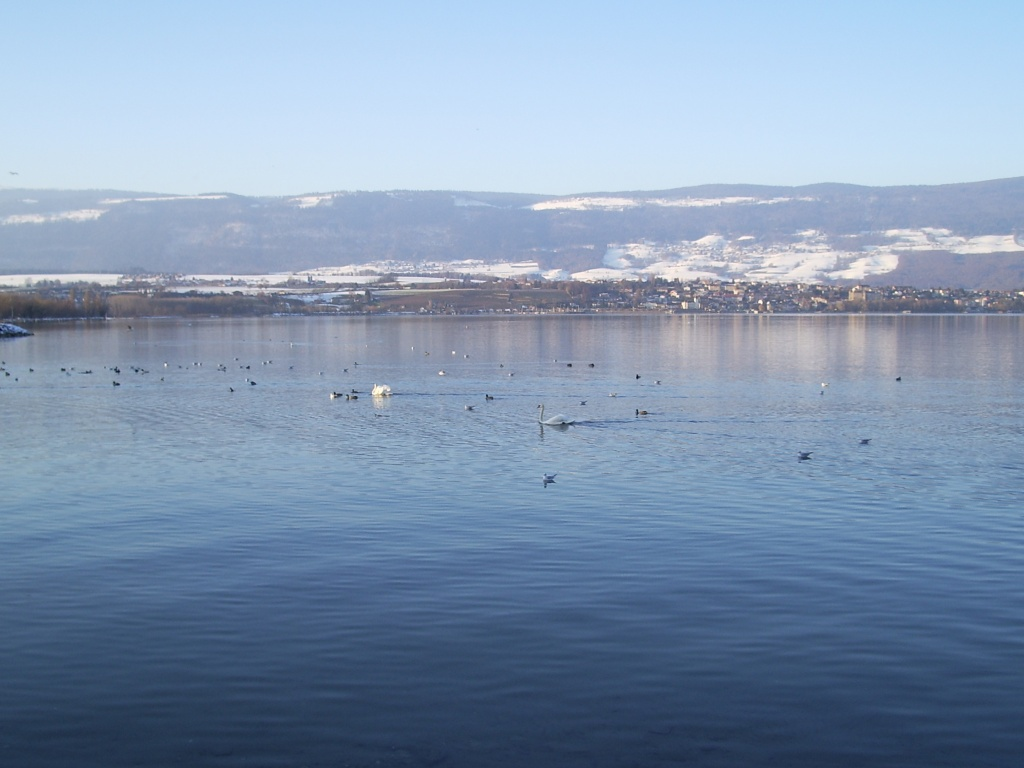
View across Lake Neuchatel toward Grandson

Grandson has an area, as of 2009, of 7.86 square kilometers (3.03 sq mi). Of this area, 5.1 km^{2} (2.0 sq mi) or 64.9% is used for agricultural purposes, while 0.69 km^{2} (0.27 sq mi) or 8.8% is forested. Of the rest of the land, 1.89 km^{2} (0.73 sq mi) or 24.0% is settled (buildings or roads), 0.09 km^{2} (22 acres) or 1.1% is either rivers or lakes and 0.13 km^{2} (32 acres) or 1.7% is unproductive land.

Of the built up area, industrial buildings made up 1.4% of the total area while housing and buildings made up 10.8% and transportation infrastructure made up 7.6%. Power and water infrastructure as well as other special developed areas made up 1.9% of the area while parks, green belts and sports fields made up 2.3%. Out of the forested land, 7.0% of the total land area is heavily forested and 1.8% is covered with orchards or small clusters of trees. Of the agricultural land, 55.2% is used for growing crops and 7.0% is pastures, while 2.7% is used for orchards or vine crops. Of the water in the municipality, 0.4% is in lakes and 0.8% is in rivers and streams.

Grandson lies at an elevation of 447 m (1,467 ft), at a distance of 3 km (1.9 mi) north of Yverdon-les-Bains.

The municipality was the capital of the Grandson District until it was dissolved on 31 August 2006, and Grandson became part of the new district of Jura-Nord Vaudois.

The town is built on moraines on the west side of the Lake of Neuchâtel near where the Gransonnet brook flows into the lake. It is at the foot of the Jura Mountains in the northern-central part of the canton of Vaud.

The territory of the municipality rises quite steeply from the shores of the lake to about 500 m (1,600 ft) on the plateau. Là Outre is the highest point in the municipality at an elevation of 540 m (1,770 ft).

The Arnon forms the northern boundary. In the southwest, it reaches to where the Brine flows into the lake.

Grandson includes the villages of Les Tuileries-de-Grandson and Corcelettes. The surrounding municipalities are Montagny-près-Yverdon, Valeyres-sous-Montagny, Giez, Fiez, Champagne, and Bonvillars.

== Coat of arms ==
The blazon of the municipal coat of arms is Azure, a Sun in his Spendour over a Crescent both Or. This municipal coat of arms was introduced in the early 20th century. Before 1798, the Swiss bailiwick of Grandson continued using the 13th-century arms of the baronial family of Grandson; this was continued as unofficial municipal arms well into the 19th century.

== Demographics ==
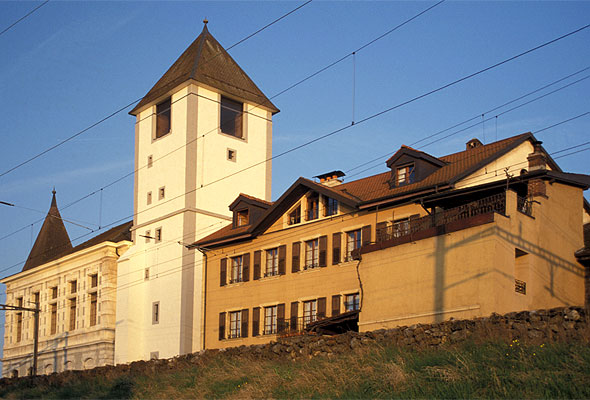
City hall building of Grandson

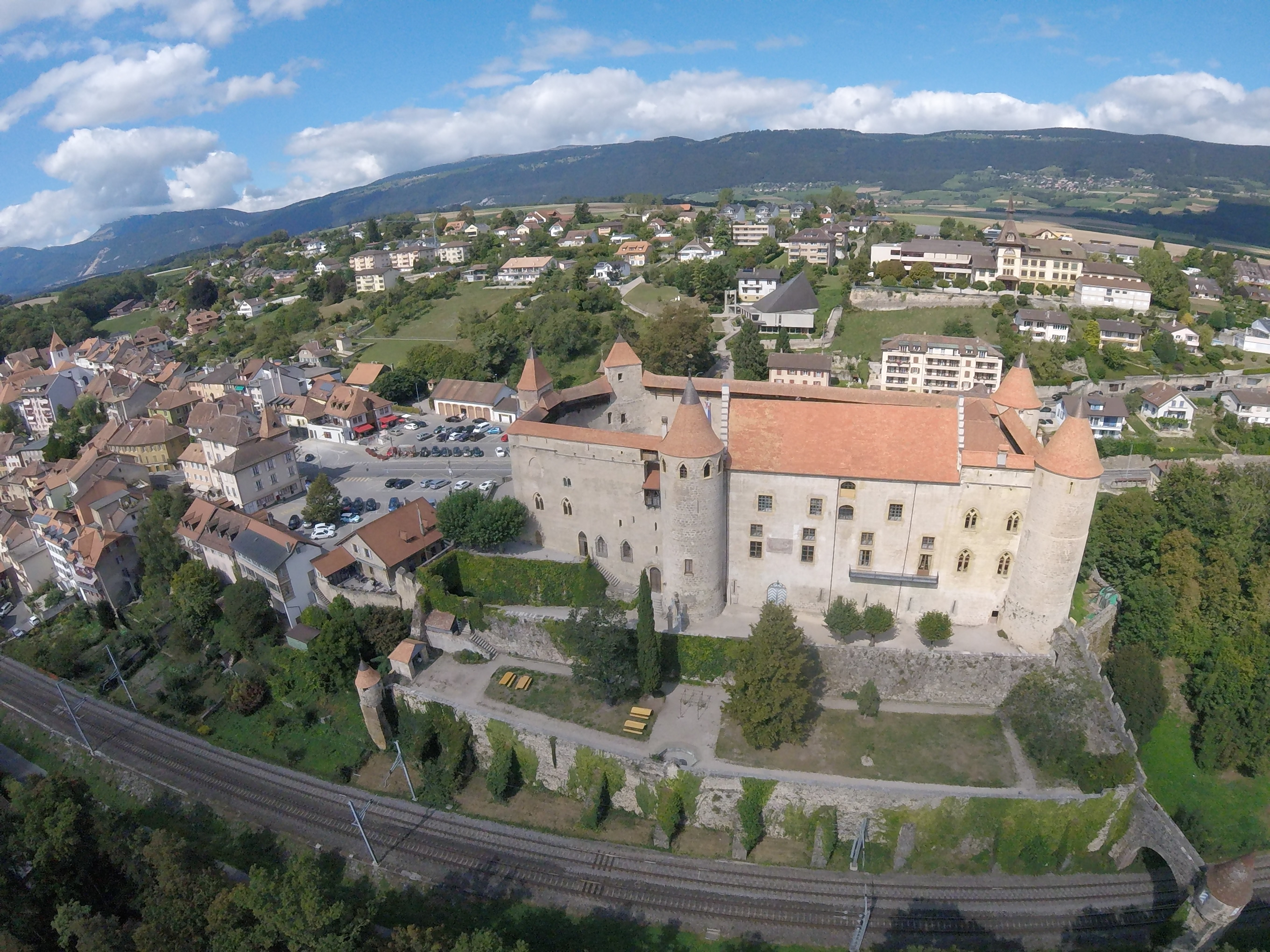
Grandson, aerial photo

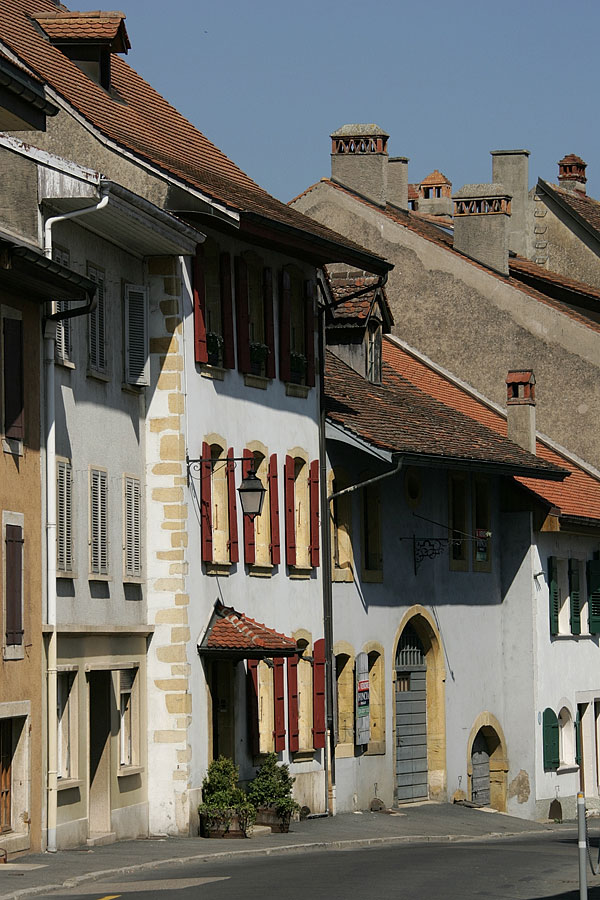
Along rue Haute in the old town

Grandson has a population (as of December 2020) of 3,358. As of 2008, 15.7% of the population are resident foreign nationals. Over the last 10 years (1999–2009 ) the population has changed at a rate of 13.1%. It has changed at a rate of 13.5% due to migration and at a rate of −0.3% due to births and deaths.

Most of the population (as of 2000) speaks French (2,464 or 89.3%), with German being second most common (109 or 4.0%) and Italian being third (45 or 1.6%).

Of the population in the municipality 537 or about 19.5% were born in Grandson and lived there in 2000. There were 1,084 or 39.3% who were born in the same canton, while 529 or 19.2% were born somewhere else in Switzerland, and 516 or 18.7% were born outside of Switzerland.

In 2008 there were 26 live births to Swiss citizens and 5 births to non-Swiss citizens, and in same time span there were 27 deaths of Swiss citizens and 2 non-Swiss citizen deaths. Ignoring immigration and emigration, the population of Swiss citizens decreased by 1 while the foreign population increased by 3. There were 3 Swiss men who emigrated from Switzerland and 1 Swiss woman who immigrated back to Switzerland. At the same time, there were 9 non-Swiss men and 9 non-Swiss women who immigrated from another country to Switzerland. The total Swiss population change in 2008 (from all sources, including moves across municipal borders) was an increase of 35 and the non-Swiss population increased by 32 people. This represents a population growth rate of 2.3%.

The age distribution, as of 2009, in Grandson is; 302 children or 10.0% of the population are between 0 and 9 years old and 375 teenagers or 12.4% are between 10 and 19. Of the adult population, 363 people or 12.0% of the population are between 20 and 29 years old. 424 people or 14.1% are between 30 and 39, 501 people or 16.6% are between 40 and 49, and 412 people or 13.7% are between 50 and 59. The senior population distribution is 312 people or 10.4% of the population are between 60 and 69 years old, 188 people or 6.2% are between 70 and 79, there are 116 people or 3.8% who are between 80 and 89, and there are 21 people or 0.7% who are 90 and older.

As of 2000, there were 1,138 people who were single and never married in the municipality. There were 1,232 married individuals, 183 widows or widowers and 206 individuals who are divorced.

As of 2000, there were 1,134 private households in the municipality, and an average of 2.3 persons per household. There were 403 households that consist of only one person and 66 households with five or more people. Out of a total of 1,171 households that answered this question, 34.4% were households made up of just one person and there were 4 adults who lived with their parents. Of the rest of the households, there are 313 married couples without children, 335 married couples with children There were 64 single parents with a child or children. There were 15 households that were made up of unrelated people and 37 households that were made up of some sort of institution or another collective housing.

In 2000 there were 378 single family homes (or 56.6% of the total) out of a total of 668 inhabited buildings. There were 146 multi-family buildings (21.9%), along with 99 multi-purpose buildings that were mostly used for housing (14.8%) and 45 other use buildings (commercial or industrial) that also had some housing (6.7%). Of the single family homes 69 were built before 1919, while 41 were built between 1990 and 2000. The greatest number of single family homes (77) were built between 1981 and 1990. The most multi-family homes (56) were built before 1919 and the next most (23) were built between 1919 and 1945. There were 11 multi-family houses built between 1996 and 2000.

In 2000 there were 1,282 apartments in the municipality. The most common apartment size was 3 rooms of which there were 385. There were 58 single room apartments and 341 apartments with five or more rooms. Of these apartments, a total of 1,101 apartments (85.9% of the total) were permanently occupied, while 147 apartments (11.5%) were seasonally occupied and 34 apartments (2.7%) were empty. As of 2009, the construction rate of new housing units was 0 new units per 1000 residents. The vacancy rate for the municipality, in 2010, was 0.77%.

The historical population is given in the following chart:

== Notable people ==
- Louis de Watteville (1776–1836), a Swiss mercenary in Dutch and British service
- Paolo Vietti-Violi (1882 in Grandson – 1965 in Vogogna, Italy) an Italian architect.

== Heritage sites of national significance ==
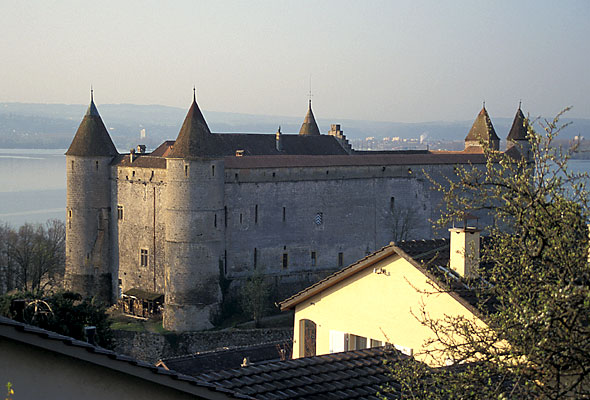
Grandson Castle

It is home to one or more prehistoric pile-dwelling (or stilt house) settlements that are part of the Prehistoric Pile dwellings around the Alps UNESCO World Heritage Site.

Grandson Castle and the Swiss Reformed Church of Saint-Jean-Baptiste are listed as Swiss heritage site of national significance. The entire town of Grandson is part of the Inventory of Swiss Heritage Sites.

== Politics ==
In the 2007 federal election the most popular party was the SP which received 22.92% of the vote. The next three most popular parties were the FDP (19.15%), the SVP (18.43%) and the LPS Party (12.55%). In the federal election, a total of 870 votes were cast, and the voter turnout was 45.1%.

== Economy ==
As of 2010, Grandson had an unemployment rate of 4.5%. As of 2008, there were 30 people employed in the primary economic sector and about 10 businesses involved in this sector. 295 people were employed in the secondary sector and there were 31 businesses in this sector. 898 people were employed in the tertiary sector, with 85 businesses in this sector. There were 1,363 residents of the municipality who were employed in some capacity, of which females made up 42.6% of the workforce.

In 2008 the total number of full-time equivalent jobs was 1,058. The number of jobs in the primary sector was 22, of which 20 were in agriculture and 1 was in fishing or fisheries. The number of jobs in the secondary sector was 285 of which 89 or (31.2%) were in manufacturing, 18 or (6.3%) were in mining and 176 (61.8%) were in construction. The number of jobs in the tertiary sector was 751. In the tertiary sector; 77 or 10.3% were in wholesale or retail sales or the repair of motor vehicles, 171 or 22.8% were in the movement and storage of goods, 64 or 8.5% were in a hotel or restaurant, 1 was in the information industry, 15 or 2.0% were the insurance or financial industry, 32 or 4.3% were technical professionals or scientists, 218 or 29.0% were in education and 135 or 18.0% were in health care.

In 2000, there were 953 workers who commuted into the municipality and 942 workers who commuted away. The municipality is a net importer of workers, with about 1.0 workers entering the municipality for every one leaving. About 6.0% of the workforce coming into Grandson are coming from outside Switzerland. Of the working population, 11.2% used public transportation to get to work, and 66.5% used a private car.

== Religion ==
From the 2000 census, 747 or 27.1% were Roman Catholic, while 1,324 or 48.0% belonged to the Swiss Reformed Church. Of the rest of the population, there were 27 members of an Orthodox church (or about 0.98% of the population), there was 1 individual who belongs to the Christian Catholic Church, and there were 103 individuals (or about 3.73% of the population) who belonged to another Christian church. There was 1 individual who was Jewish, and 78 (or about 2.83% of the population) who were Islamic. There were 5 individuals who were Buddhist and 4 individuals who belonged to another church. 375 (or about 13.59% of the population) belonged to no church, are agnostic or atheist, and 145 individuals (or about 5.26% of the population) did not answer the question.

== Education ==
In Grandson about 1,025 or (37.2%) of the population have completed non-mandatory upper secondary education, and 374 or (13.6%) have completed additional higher education (either university or a Fachhochschule). Of the 374 who completed tertiary schooling, 58.0% were Swiss men, 26.2% were Swiss women, 12.6% were non-Swiss men and 3.2% were non-Swiss women.

In the 2009/2010 school year there were a total of 371 students in the Grandson school district. In the Vaud cantonal school system, two years of non-obligatory pre-school are provided by the political districts. During the school year, the political district provided pre-school care for a total of 578 children of which 359 children (62.1%) received subsidized pre-school care. The canton's primary school program requires students to attend for four years. There were 183 students in the municipal primary school program. The obligatory lower secondary school program lasts for six years and there were 183 students in those schools. There were also 5 students who were home schooled or attended another non-traditional school.

Grandson is home to 1 museum, the Fondation du Château de Grandson. In 2009 it was visited by 54,510 visitors (the average in previous years was 57,723).

As of 2000, there were 326 students in Grandson who came from another municipality, while 159 residents attended schools outside the municipality.

== Transportation ==
The municipality has a railway station, Grandson, on the Jura Foot line. It has regular service to Yverdon-les-Bains, Lausanne, and Aigle.

== See also ==
- Urnfield culture
