= Vuiteboeuf =

- Municipality
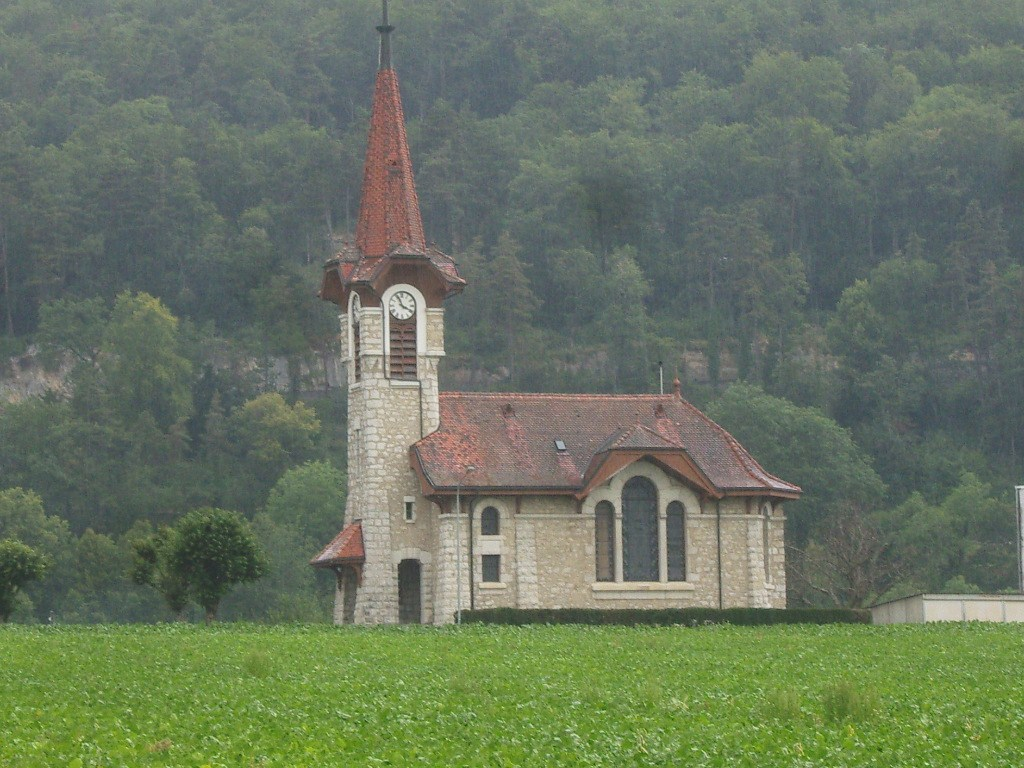
- Vuiteboeuf village church

- Flag Coat of arms
- Location of Vuiteboeuf
- Location within Switzerland Location within Canton of Vaud
- Coordinates: 46°48.484′N 6°32.9499′E
- Country: Switzerland
- Canton: Vaud
- District: Jura-Nord Vaudois

Government
  - Mayor: Syndic; Georges Karlen

Area
  - Total: 5.03 km^{2} (1.94 sq mi)
- Elevation: 610 m (2,000 ft)
- Highest elevation: 1,165 m (3,822 ft)
- Lowest elevation: 492 m (1,614 ft)

Population (2006)
  - Total: 477
  - Density: 94.8/km^{2} (246/sq mi)
- Demonym: Les Vuitebolards
- Time zone: UTC+01:00 (CET)
  - Summer (DST): UTC+02:00 (CEST)
- Postal code: 1445
- SFOS number: 5766
- ISO 3166 code: CH-VD
- Localities: Peney
- Surrounded by: Sainte-Croix, Vugelles-La Mothe, Orges, Valeyres-sous-Montagny, Essert-sous-Champvent, Champvent, Baulmes
- Website: www.vuiteboeuf.ch

Vuiteboeuf (french pronunciation: [vitbœf]) is a municipality in the district of Jura-Nord Vaudois in the canton of Vaud in Switzerland.

== History ==
Vuiteboeuf is first mentioned in 1028 as Vaitibo.

== Geography ==
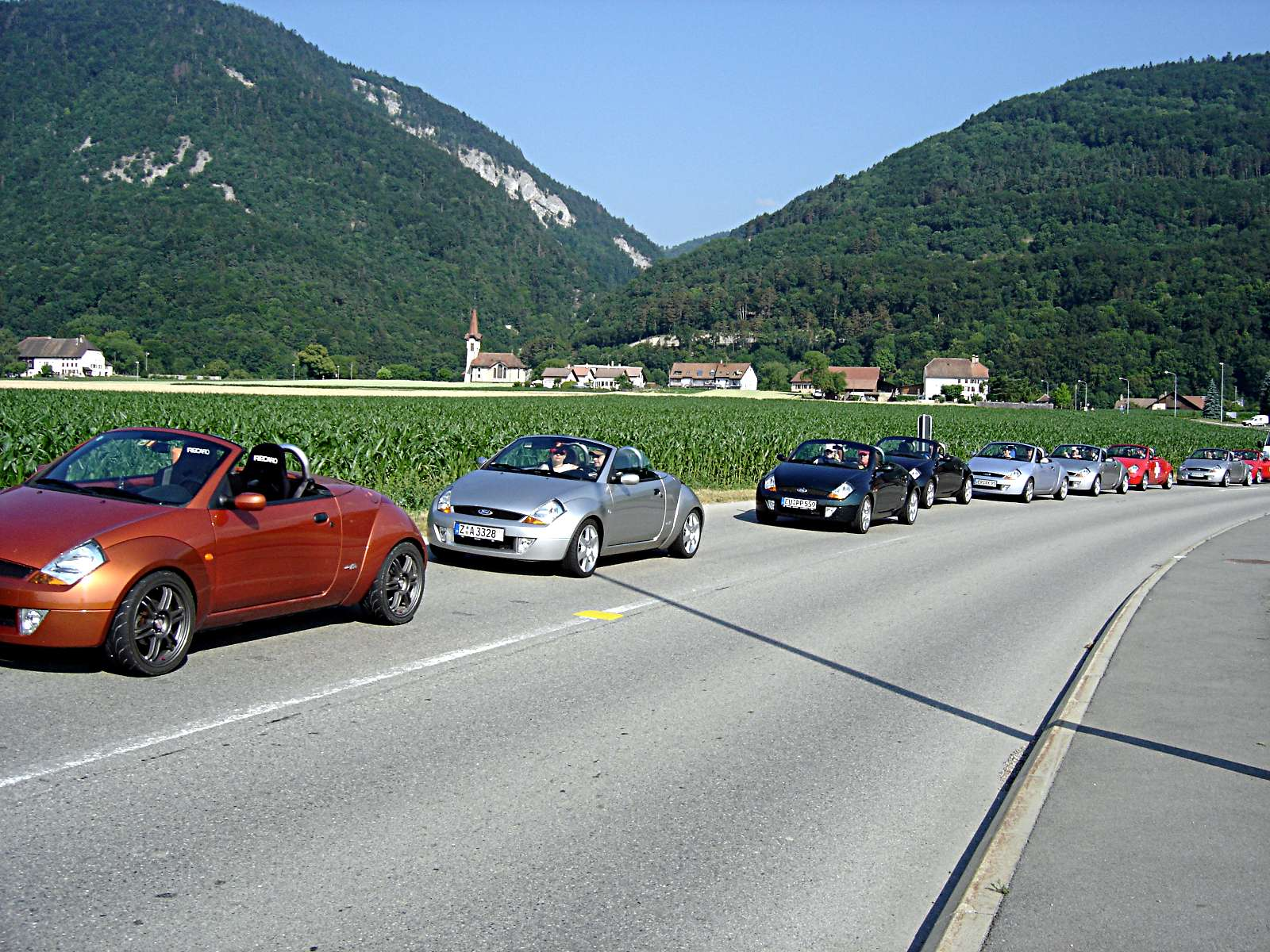
Cars stopped for a train outside Vuiteboeuf

Vuiteboeuf has an area, as of 2009, of 5.1 square kilometers (2.0 mi^{2}). Of this area, 2.45 km^{2} (0.95 mi^{2}) or 48.4% is used for agricultural purposes, while 2.2 km^{2} (0.85 mi^{2}) or 43.5% is forested. Of the rest of the land, 0.44 km^{2} (0.17 mi^{2}) or 8.7% is settled (buildings or roads), 0.01 km^{2} (2.5 acres) or 0.2% is either rivers or lakes.

Of the built up area, housing and buildings made up 2.6% and transportation infrastructure made up 5.1%. Out of the forested land, 41.7% of the total land area is heavily forested and 1.8% is covered with orchards or small clusters of trees. Of the agricultural land, 40.7% is used for growing crops and 6.3% is pastures, while 1.4% is used for orchards or vine crops. All the water in the municipality is flowing water.

The municipality was part of the Orbe District until it was dissolved on 31 August 2006, and Vuiteboeuf became part of the new district of Jura-Nord Vaudois.

The municipality is located at the foot of the Sainte-Croix hills. It consists of the village of Vuiteboeuf and the hamlet of Peney.

== Coat of arms ==
The blazon of the municipal coat of arms is Argent, a Bar wavy Azure, in chief three Mining-wheels Sable, in base a Church of the first roofed Gules.

== Demographics ==
Vuiteboeuf has a population (as of December 2020) of 588. As of 2008, 19.9% of the population are resident foreign nationals. Over the last 10 years (1999–2009 ) the population has changed at a rate of 11.8%. It has changed at a rate of 1.9% due to migration and at a rate of 9.9% due to births and deaths.

Most of the population (as of 2000) speaks French (367 or 88.0%), with Portuguese being second most common (12 or 2.9%) and Albanian being third (9 or 2.2%). There are 6 people who speak German, 6 people who speak Italian.

The age distribution, as of 2009, in Vuiteboeuf is; 68 children or 14.3% of the population are between 0 and 9 years old and 67 teenagers or 14.1% are between 10 and 19. Of the adult population, 66 people or 13.9% of the population are between 20 and 29 years old. 66 people or 13.9% are between 30 and 39, 79 people or 16.6% are between 40 and 49, and 55 people or 11.6% are between 50 and 59. The senior population distribution is 36 people or 7.6% of the population are between 60 and 69 years old, 16 people or 3.4% are between 70 and 79, there are 20 people or 4.2% who are between 80 and 89, and there are 2 people or 0.4% who are 90 and older.

As of 2000, there were 204 people who were single and never married in the municipality. There were 167 married individuals, 17 widows or widowers and 29 individuals who are divorced.

As of 2000, there were 161 private households in the municipality, and an average of 2.5 persons per household. There were 48 households that consist of only one person and 15 households with five or more people. Out of a total of 166 households that answered this question, 28.9% were households made up of just one person. Of the rest of the households, there are 36 married couples without children, 62 married couples with children There were 15 single parents with a child or children.

In 2000 there were 39 single family homes (or 39.0% of the total) out of a total of 100 inhabited buildings. There were 18 multi-family buildings (18.0%), along with 31 multi-purpose buildings that were mostly used for housing (31.0%) and 12 other use buildings (commercial or industrial) that also had some housing (12.0%). In 2000, a total of 156 apartments (87.2% of the total) were permanently occupied, while 10 apartments (5.6%) were seasonally occupied and 13 apartments (7.3%) were empty. As of 2009, the construction rate of new housing units was 0 new units per 1000 residents. The vacancy rate for the municipality, in 2010, was 0.53%.

The historical population is given in the following chart:

== Politics ==
In the 2007 federal election the most popular party was the SVP which received 33.83% of the vote. The next three most popular parties were the SP (18.62%), the Green Party (10.18%) and the FDP (8.04%). In the federal election, a total of 106 votes were cast, and the voter turnout was 38.4%.

== Economy ==
As of 2010, Vuiteboeuf had an unemployment rate of 8.3%. As of 2008, there were 23 people employed in the primary economic sector and about 10 businesses involved in this sector. 45 people were employed in the secondary sector and there were 12 businesses in this sector. 64 people were employed in the tertiary sector, with 17 businesses in this sector. There were 205 residents of the municipality who were employed in some capacity, of which females made up 41.5% of the workforce.

In 2008 the total number of full-time equivalent jobs was 106. The number of jobs in the primary sector was 17, all of which were in agriculture. The number of jobs in the secondary sector was 39 of which 12 or (30.8%) were in manufacturing and 24 (61.5%) were in construction. The number of jobs in the tertiary sector was 50. In the tertiary sector; 30 or 60.0% were in wholesale or retail sales or the repair of motor vehicles, 1 was in the movement and storage of goods, 3 or 6.0% were in a hotel or restaurant, 1 was the insurance or financial industry, 3 or 6.0% were in education and 1 was in health care.

In 2000, there were 37 workers who commuted into the municipality and 137 workers who commuted away. The municipality is a net exporter of workers, with about 3.7 workers leaving the municipality for every one entering. About 10.8% of the workforce coming into Vuiteboeuf are coming from outside Switzerland. Of the working population, 12.2% used public transportation to get to work, and 56.1% used a private car.

== Transport ==
The meter gauge electric Yverdon–Ste-Croix railway line links Vuiteboeuf with Yverdon-les-Bains and Sainte-Croix.

== Religion ==
From the 2000 census, 122 or 29.3% were Roman Catholic, while 222 or 53.2% belonged to the Swiss Reformed Church. Of the rest of the population, there was 1 member of an Orthodox church, and there were 3 individuals (or about 0.72% of the population) who belonged to another Christian church. There were 12 (or about 2.88% of the population) who were Islamic. There were 3 individuals who were Hindu. 53 (or about 12.71% of the population) belonged to no church, are agnostic or atheist, and 2 individuals (or about 0.48% of the population) did not answer the question.

== Education ==
In Vuiteboeuf about 138 or (33.1%) of the population have completed non-mandatory upper secondary education, and 41 or (9.8%) have completed additional higher education (either university or a Fachhochschule). Of the 41 who completed tertiary schooling, 48.8% were Swiss men, 31.7% were Swiss women, 14.6% were non-Swiss men.

In the 2009/2010 school year there were a total of 81 students in the Vuiteboeuf school district. In the Vaud cantonal school system, two years of non-obligatory pre-school are provided by the political districts. During the school year, the political district provided pre-school care for a total of 578 children of which 359 children (62.1%) received subsidized pre-school care. The canton's primary school program requires students to attend for four years. There were 47 students in the municipal primary school program. The obligatory lower secondary school program lasts for six years and there were 34 students in those schools.

As of 2000, there were 33 students in Vuiteboeuf who came from another municipality, while 59 residents attended schools outside the municipality.
