= Bullet, Switzerland =

Bullet
- Municipality
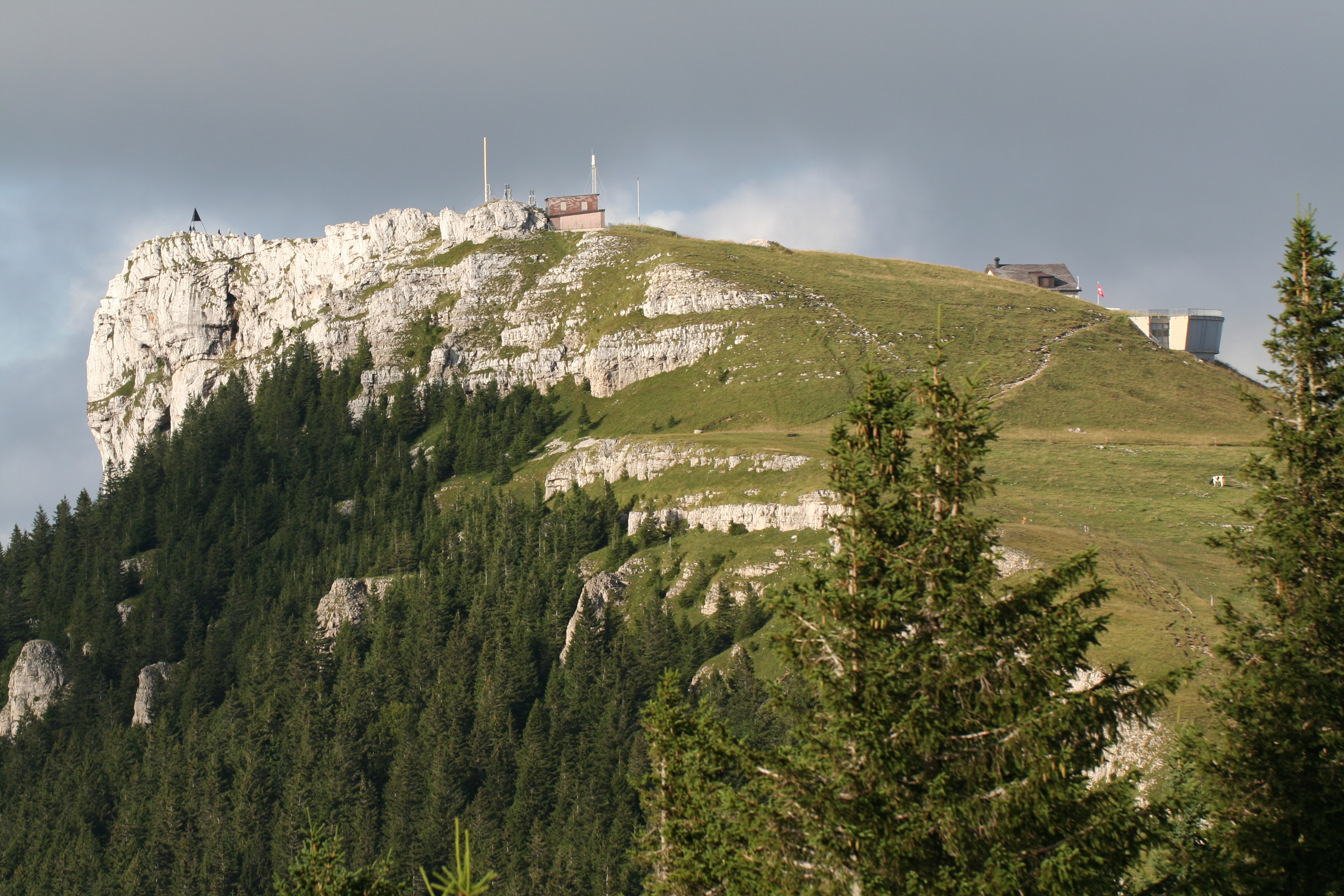

- Flag Coat of arms
- Location of Bullet
- Location within Switzerland Location within Canton of Vaud
- Coordinates: 46°49′N 06°33′E
- Country: Switzerland
- Canton: Vaud
- District: Jura-Nord Vaudois

Government
  - Mayor: Syndic; Jean-Franco Paillard

Area
  - Total: 16.83 km^{2} (6.50 sq mi)
- Elevation: 1,137 m (3,730 ft)

Population (2004)
  - Total: 581
  - Density: 34.5/km^{2} (89.4/sq mi)
- Demonym(s): Les Bullatons; Lè Pi-Bot
- Time zone: UTC+01:00 (CET)
  - Summer (DST): UTC+02:00 (CEST)
- Postal codes: 1452 Les Rasses; 1453 Bullet
- SFOS number: 5552
- ISO 3166 code: CH-VD
- Localities: Chasseron, Les Cluds, Les Rasses
- Surrounded by: Fiez, Fontaines-sur-Grandson, Grandevent, Novalles, Vugelles-La Mothe, Sainte-Croix
- Website: https://www.bullet.ch Profile (in French), SFSO statistics

Bullet (French pronunciation: [bylɛ]) is a municipality in the district of Jura-Nord Vaudois in the canton of Vaud in Switzerland.

== History ==
Bullet is first mentioned in 1323 as Buleto.

== Geography ==
Aerial view (1970)

Bullet has an area, as of 2009, of 16.83 square kilometres (6.50 sq mi). Of this area, 8.01 km^{2} (3.09 sq mi) or 47.6% is used for agricultural purposes, while 7.84 km^{2} (3.03 sq mi) or 46.6% is forested. Of the rest of the land, 0.89 km^{2} (0.34 sq mi) or 5.3% is settled (buildings or roads), 0.01 km^{2} (2.5 acres) or 0.1% is either rivers or lakes and 0.11 km^{2} (27 acres) or 0.7% is unproductive land.

Of the built up area, housing and buildings made up 3.1% and transportation infrastructure made up 1.7%. Out of the forested land, 38.5% of the total land area is heavily forested and 8.1% is covered with orchards or small clusters of trees. Of the agricultural land, 1.0% is used for growing crops and 14.6% is pastures and 32.0% is used for alpine pastures. All the water in the municipality is in lakes.

The municipality was part of the Grandson District until it was dissolved on 31 August 2006, and Bullet became part of the new district of Jura-Nord Vaudois.

The municipality is located in the Vaudois Jura. The town lies on the end moraine of the ice age era Rhone glacier. It consists of the village of Bullet (elevation 1,143 m (3,750 ft)) and the hamlets of Les Rasses, Les Cluds, La Crochère, Les Crosats and La Frétaz.

== Coat of arms ==
The blazon of the municipal coat of arms is Per fess Gules and Sable, overall a rock Or.

== Demographics ==
Bullet has a population (as of December 2020) of 658. As of 2008, 7.3% of the population are resident foreign nationals. Over the last 10 years (1999–2009 ) the population has changed at a rate of 10.1%. It has changed at a rate of 14.3% due to migration and at a rate of -3.6% due to births and deaths.

Most of the population (as of 2000) speaks French (482 or 92.3%), with German being second most common (30 or 5.7%) and Italian being third (4 or 0.8%).

Of the population in the municipality 215 or about 41.2% were born in Bullet and lived there in 2000. There were 163 or 31.2% who were born in the same canton, while 83 or 15.9% were born somewhere else in Switzerland, and 55 or 10.5% were born outside of Switzerland.

In 2008 there were 4 live births to Swiss citizens and were 7 deaths of Swiss citizens. Ignoring immigration and emigration, the population of Swiss citizens decreased by 3 while the foreign population remained the same. There was 1 Swiss man and 1 Swiss woman who immigrated back to Switzerland. At the same time, there were 4 non-Swiss men and 1 non-Swiss woman who immigrated from another country to Switzerland. The total Swiss population change in 2008 (from all sources, including moves across municipal borders) was a decrease of 1 and the non-Swiss population increased by 7 people. This represents a population growth rate of 1.1%.

The age distribution, as of 2009, in Bullet is; 57 children or 9.7% of the population are between 0 and 9 years old and 59 teenagers or 10.1% are between 10 and 19. Of the adult population, 44 people or 7.5% of the population are between 20 and 29 years old. 66 people or 11.2% are between 30 and 39, 83 people or 14.1% are between 40 and 49, and 85 people or 14.5% are between 50 and 59. The senior population distribution is 86 people or 14.7% of the population are between 60 and 69 years old, 68 people or 11.6% are between 70 and 79, there are 35 people or 6.0% who are between 80 and 89, and there are 4 people or 0.7% who are 90 and older.

As of 2000, there were 179 people who were single and never married in the municipality. There were 269 married individuals, 35 widows or widowers and 39 individuals who are divorced.

As of 2000, there were 225 private households in the municipality, and an average of 2.2 persons per household. There were 73 households that consist of only one person and 20 households with five or more people. Out of a total of 235 households that answered this question, 31.1% were households made up of just one person and there were 2 adults who lived with their parents. Of the rest of the households, there are 79 married couples without children, 51 married couples with children There were 10 single parents with a child or children. There were 10 households that were made up of unrelated people and 10 households that were made up of some sort of institution or another collective housing.

In 2000 there were 199 single family homes (or 62.8% of the total) out of a total of 317 inhabited buildings. There were 58 multi-family buildings (18.3%), along with 33 multi-purpose buildings that were mostly used for housing (10.4%) and 27 other use buildings (commercial or industrial) that also had some housing (8.5%). Of the single family homes 43 were built before 1919, while 8 were built between 1990 and 2000. The greatest number of single family homes (52) were built between 1961 and 1970. The most multi-family homes (29) were built before 1919 and the next most (6) were built between 1946 and 1960. There were 2 multi-family houses built between 1996 and 2000.

In 2000 there were 416 apartments in the municipality. The most common apartment size was 3 rooms of which there were 137. There were 9 single room apartments and 116 apartments with five or more rooms. Of these apartments, a total of 220 apartments (52.9% of the total) were permanently occupied, while 160 apartments (38.5%) were seasonally occupied and 36 apartments (8.7%) were empty. As of 2009, the construction rate of new housing units was 1.7 new units per 1000 residents. The vacancy rate for the municipality, in 2010, was 1.84%.

The historical population is given in the following chart:

== Climate ==
Climate in this area has mild differences between highs and lows, and there is adequate rainfall year-round. The Köppen Climate Classification subtype for this climate is "Cfb". (Marine West Coast Climate/Oceanic climate).

Climate data for Bullet/La Frétaz, elevation 1,205 m (3,953 ft), (1991–2020)
Month	Jan	Feb	Mar	Apr	May	Jun	Jul	Aug	Sep	Oct	Nov	Dec	Year
Mean daily maximum °C (°F)	1.8 (35.2)	2.0 (35.6)	5.2 (41.4)	8.9 (48.0)	12.9 (55.2)	16.7 (62.1)	18.9 (66.0)	18.5 (65.3)	14.3 (57.7)	10.4 (50.7)	5.5 (41.9)	2.7 (36.9)	9.8 (49.6)
Daily mean °C (°F)	−0.9 (30.4)	−0.9 (30.4)	1.9 (35.4)	5.1 (41.2)	9.1 (48.4)	12.7 (54.9)	14.8 (58.6)	14.6 (58.3)	10.7 (51.3)	7.2 (45.0)	2.7 (36.9)	0.0 (32.0)	6.4 (43.5)
Mean daily minimum °C (°F)	−3.6 (25.5)	−3.7 (25.3)	−1.1 (30.0)	1.8 (35.2)	5.5 (41.9)	8.9 (48.0)	10.9 (51.6)	11.0 (51.8)	7.6 (45.7)	4.4 (39.9)	0.0 (32.0)	−2.7 (27.1)	3.3 (37.9)
Average precipitation mm (inches)	106.3 (4.19)	87.1 (3.43)	93.3 (3.67)	90.4 (3.56)	117.6 (4.63)	115.4 (4.54)	115.6 (4.55)	120.0 (4.72)	101.9 (4.01)	121.4 (4.78)	110.3 (4.34)	126.2 (4.97)	1,305.5 (51.40)
Average precipitation days (≥ 1.0 mm)	11.5	10.1	10.5	10.8	13.0	11.8	11.0	11.1	9.9	11.6	11.0	12.2	134.5
Average relative humidity (%)	80	79	77	75	78	77	75	77	82	83	81	81	79
Mean monthly sunshine hours	85.5	99.4	141.9	153.1	172.3	192.6	213.4	197.4	149.9	115.0	81.5	78.4	1,680.4
Percentage possible sunshine	36	38	43	42	42	47	51	51	45	38	34	34	43
Source 1: NOAA
Source 2: MeteoSwiss

== Politics ==
In the 2007 federal election the most popular party was the SVP which received 31.54% of the vote. The next three most popular parties were the SP (27.69%), the FDP (9.9%) and the Green Party (8.72%). In the federal election, a total of 204 votes were cast, and the voter turnout was 46.7%.

== Economy ==
As of 2010, Bullet had an unemployment rate of 1%. As of 2008, there were 36 people employed in the primary economic sector and about 11 businesses involved in this sector. 23 people were employed in the secondary sector and there were 6 businesses in this sector. 107 people were employed in the tertiary sector, with 20 businesses in this sector. There were 244 residents of the municipality who were employed in some capacity, of which females made up 43.4% of the workforce.

In 2008 the total number of full-time equivalent jobs was 132. The number of jobs in the primary sector was 28, of which 22 were in agriculture and 6 were in forestry or lumber production. The number of jobs in the secondary sector was 22 of which 15 or (68.2%) were in manufacturing and 8 (36.4%) were in construction. The number of jobs in the tertiary sector was 82. In the tertiary sector; 2 or 2.4% were in wholesale or retail sales or the repair of motor vehicles, 1 was in the movement and storage of goods, 51 or 62.2% were in a hotel or restaurant, 2 or 2.4% were the insurance or financial industry, 4 or 4.9% were in education and 18 or 22.0% were in health care.

In 2000, there were 89 workers who commuted into the municipality and 139 workers who commuted away. The municipality is a net exporter of workers, with about 1.6 workers leaving the municipality for every one entering. About 21.3% of the workforce coming into Bullet are coming from outside Switzerland. Of the working population, 8.6% used public transportation to get to work, and 54.9% used a private car.

== Religion ==
From the 2000 census, 67 or 12.8% were Roman Catholic, while 398 or 76.2% belonged to the Swiss Reformed Church. Of the rest of the population, there were 2 members of an Orthodox church (or about 0.38% of the population), and there were 12 individuals (or about 2.30% of the population) who belonged to another Christian church. There was 1 individual who was Jewish, and 42 (or about 8.05% of the population) belonged to no church, are agnostic or atheist, and 6 individuals (or about 1.15% of the population) did not answer the question.

== Education ==
In Bullet about 216 or (41.4%) of the population have completed non-mandatory upper secondary education, and 47 or (9.0%) have completed additional higher education (either university or a Fachhochschule). Of the 47 who completed tertiary schooling, 68.1% were Swiss men, 19.1% were Swiss women.

In the 2009/2010 school year there were a total of 65 students in the Bullet school district. In the Vaud cantonal school system, two years of non-obligatory pre-school are provided by the political districts. During the school year, the political district provided pre-school care for a total of 578 children of which 359 children (62.1%) received subsidized pre-school care. The canton's primary school program requires students to attend for four years. There were 29 students in the municipal primary school program. The obligatory lower secondary school program lasts for six years and there were 36 students in those schools.

As of 2000, there were 20 students in Bullet who came from another municipality, while 55 residents attended schools outside the municipality.
