= Grandevent =

- Municipality
- Flag Coat of arms
- Location of Grandevent
- Location within Switzerland Location within Canton of Vaud
- Coordinates: 46°50′N 6°36′E
- Country: Switzerland
- Canton: Vaud
- District: Jura-Nord Vaudois

Government
  - Mayor: Syndic

Area
  - Total: 3.45 km^{2} (1.33 sq mi)
- Elevation: 665 m (2,182 ft)

Population (December 2004)
  - Total: 169
  - Density: 49.0/km^{2} (127/sq mi)
- Time zone: UTC+01:00 (CET)
  - Summer (DST): UTC+02:00 (CEST)
- Postal code: 1421
- SFOS number: 5560
- ISO 3166 code: CH-VD
- Surrounded by: Bullet, Fontaines-sur-Grandson, Novalles
- Website: grandevent.ch

Grandevent is a municipality in the district of Jura-Nord Vaudois in the canton of Vaud in Switzerland.

== History ==
Grandevent is first mentioned in the 16th century as Grandevens.

== Geography ==
Grandevent has an area, as of 2009, of 3.45 square kilometers (1.33 sq mi). Of this area, 1.57 km^{2} (0.61 sq mi) or 45.5% is used for agricultural purposes, while 1.77 km^{2} (0.68 sq mi) or 51.3% is forested. Of the rest of the land, 0.11 km^{2} (27 acres) or 3.2% is settled (buildings or roads).

Of the built up area, housing and buildings made up 2.0% and transportation infrastructure made up 1.2%. Out of the forested land, 43.8% of the total land area is heavily forested and 7.5% is covered with orchards or small clusters of trees. Of the agricultural land, 8.7% is used for growing crops and 11.0% is pastures, while 1.4% is used for orchards or vine crops and 24.3% is used for alpine pastures.

The municipality was part of the Grandson District until it was dissolved on 31 August 2006, and Grandevent became part of the new district of Jura-Nord Vaudois.

The municipality is located on the edge of the Jura Mountains, 5 km (3.1 mi) from Grandson. It consists of the village of Grandevent, the hamlet of Vers-chez-Grison and the seasonal alpine camp of Le Grand-Brelingard.

== Coat of arms ==
The blazon of the municipal coat of arms is Pally of Six Argent and Azure, overall a Rooster Gules.

== Demographics ==
Grandevent has a population (as of December 2020) of 226. As of 2008, 8.2% of the population are resident foreign nationals. Over the last 10 years (1999–2009 ) the population has changed at a rate of 37.2%. It has changed at a rate of 35.8% due to migration and at a rate of 1.4% due to births and deaths.

Most of the population (as of 2000) speaks French (133 or 92.4%), with German being second most common (5 or 3.5%) and Italian being third (2 or 1.4%).

Of the population in the municipality 25 or about 17.4% were born in Grandevent and lived there in 2000. There were 62 or 43.1% who were born in the same canton, while 43 or 29.9% were born somewhere else in Switzerland, and 14 or 9.7% were born outside of Switzerland.

The total Swiss population change in 2008 (from all sources, including moves across municipal borders) was an increase of 1 and the non-Swiss population increased by 2 people. This represents a population growth rate of 1.6%.

The age distribution, as of 2009, in Grandevent is; 22 children or 10.8% of the population are between 0 and 9 years old and 29 teenagers or 14.3% are between 10 and 19. Of the adult population, 15 people or 7.4% of the population are between 20 and 29 years old. 29 people or 14.3% are between 30 and 39, 39 people or 19.2% are between 40 and 49, and 29 people or 14.3% are between 50 and 59. The senior population distribution is 23 people or 11.3% of the population are between 60 and 69 years old, 13 people or 6.4% are between 70 and 79, there are 4 people or 2.0% who are between 80 and 89.

As of 2000, there were 52 people who were single and never married in the municipality. There were 80 married individuals, 5 widows or widowers and 7 individuals who are divorced.

As of 2000, there were 59 private households in the municipality, and an average of 2.4 persons per household. There were 10 households that consist of only one person and 2 households with five or more people. Out of a total of 60 households that answered this question, 16.7% were households made up of just one person. Of the rest of the households, there are 29 married couples without children, 15 married couples with children There were 4 single parents with a child or children. There was 1 household that was made up of unrelated people and 1 household that was made up of some sort of institution or another collective housing.

In 2000 there were 56 single family homes (or 77.8% of the total) out of a total of 72 inhabited buildings. There were 6 multi-family buildings (8.3%), along with 9 multi-purpose buildings that were mostly used for housing (12.5%) and 1 other use buildings (commercial or industrial) that also had some housing (1.4%). Of the single family homes 11 were built before 1919, while 4 were built between 1990 and 2000. The greatest number of single family homes (23) were built between 1971 and 1980. The most multi-family homes (2) were built between 1961 and 1970 and the next most (1) was built before 1919.

In 2000 there were 79 apartments in the municipality. The most common apartment size was 4 rooms of which there were 25. There were 4 single room apartments and 28 apartments with five or more rooms. Of these apartments, a total of 58 apartments (73.4% of the total) were permanently occupied, while 14 apartments (17.7%) were seasonally occupied and 7 apartments (8.9%) were empty. As of 2009, the construction rate of new housing units was 9.9 new units per 1000 residents. The vacancy rate for the municipality, in 2010, was 1%.

The historical population is given in the following chart:

== Politics ==
In the 2007 federal election the most popular party was the SVP which received 27.94% of the vote. The next three most popular parties were the SP (15.98%), the Green Party (15.59%) and the FDP (14.8%). In the federal election, a total of 63 votes were cast, and the voter turnout was 48.1%.

== Economy ==
As of 2010, Grandevent had an unemployment rate of 2.1%. As of 2008, there were 4 people employed in the primary economic sector and about 3 businesses involved in this sector. people were employed in the secondary sector and there were businesses in this sector. 1 person was employed in the tertiary sector, with 1 business in this sector. There were 79 residents of the municipality who were employed in some capacity, of which females made up 39.2% of the workforce.

In 2008 the total number of full-time equivalent jobs was 4. The number of jobs in the primary sector was 3, all of which were in agriculture. There were no jobs in the secondary sector. The number of jobs in the tertiary sector was 1, which was in the information industry.

In 2000, there were 67 workers who commuted away from the municipality. Of the working population, 7.6% used public transportation to get to work, and 77.2% used a private car.

== Religion ==
From the 2000 census, 33 or 22.9% were Roman Catholic, while 63 or 43.8% belonged to the Swiss Reformed Church. Of the rest of the population, there were 4 individuals (or about 2.78% of the population) who belonged to another Christian church. There was 1 individual who was Jewish, and There were 5 individuals who were Buddhist. 30 (or about 20.83% of the population) belonged to no church, are agnostic or atheist, and 10 individuals (or about 6.94% of the population) did not answer the question.

== Education ==
In Grandevent about 60 or (41.7%) of the population have completed non-mandatory upper secondary education, and 28 or (19.4%) have completed additional higher education (either university or a Fachhochschule). Of the 28 who completed tertiary schooling, 57.1% were Swiss men, 32.1% were Swiss women.

In the 2009/2010 school year there were a total of 34 students in the Grandevent school district. In the Vaud cantonal school system, two years of non-obligatory pre-school are provided by the political districts. During the school year, the political district provided pre-school care for a total of 578 children of which 359 children (62.1%) received subsidized pre-school care. The canton's primary school program requires students to attend for four years. There were 15 students in the municipal primary school program. The obligatory lower secondary school program lasts for six years and there were 19 students in those schools.

As of 2000, there were 17 students from Grandevent who attended schools outside the municipality.
