= Orges, Switzerland =

Orges
- Municipality
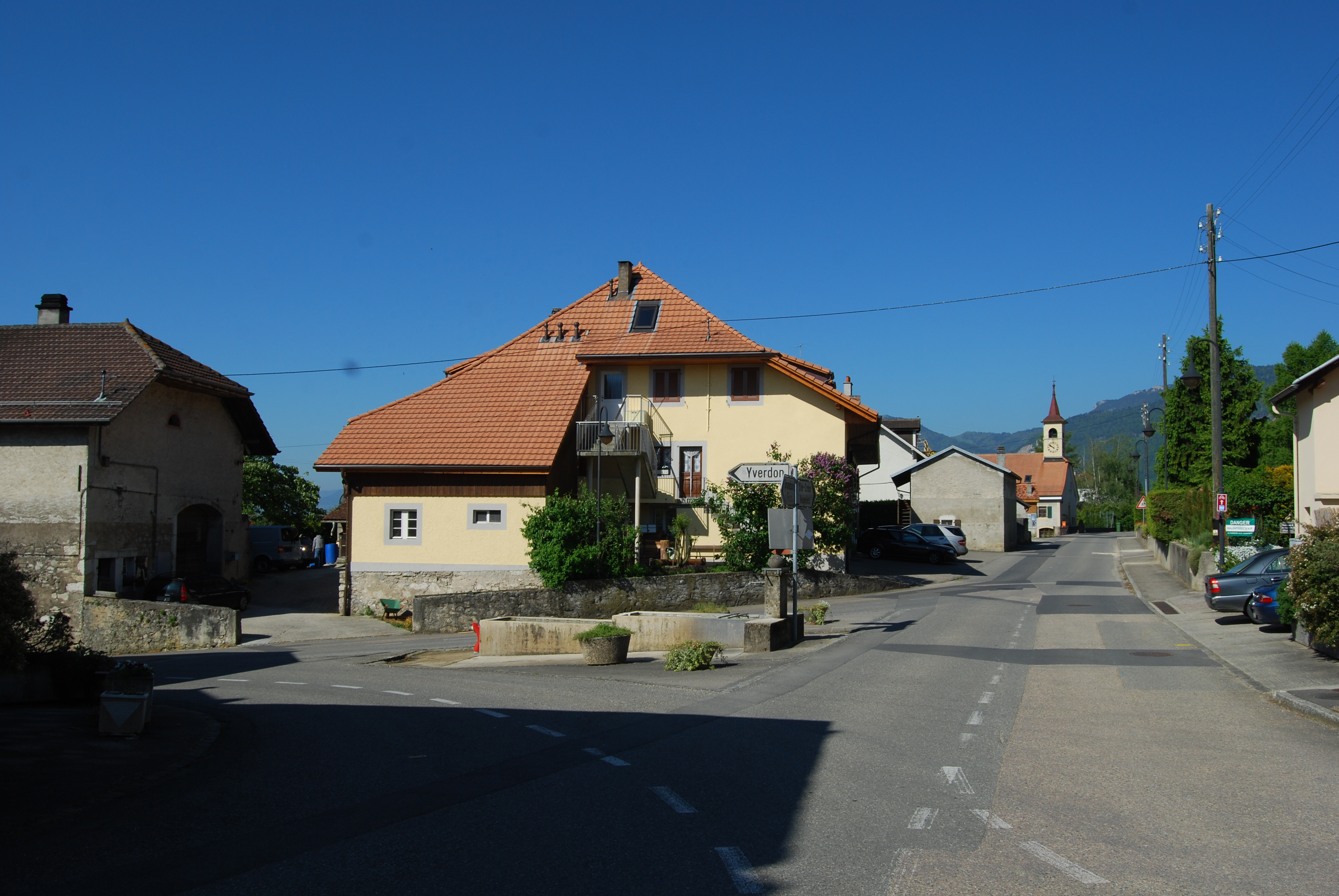

- Flag Coat of arms
- Location of Orges
- Location within Switzerland Location within Canton of Vaud
- Coordinates: 46°49′N 6°35′E
- Country: Switzerland
- Canton: Vaud
- District: Jura-Nord Vaudois

Government
  - Mayor: Syndic; Jean-Marc Ducret

Area
  - Total: 4.01 km^{2} (1.55 sq mi)
- Elevation: 560 m (1,840 ft)

Population (2003)
  - Total: 223
  - Density: 55.6/km^{2} (144/sq mi)
- Time zone: UTC+01:00 (CET)
  - Summer (DST): UTC+02:00 (CEST)
- Postal code: 1430
- SFOS number: 5924
- ISO 3166 code: CH-VD
- Surrounded by: Champvent, Giez, Valeyres-sous-Montagny, Vugelles-La Mothe, Vuiteboeuf
- Website: https://www.orges.ch/ Profile (in French), SFSO statistics

Orges is a municipality in the district of Jura-Nord Vaudois of the canton of Vaud in Switzerland.

== History ==
Orges is first mentioned in 1260 as Orses. The country estate of Longeville is first mentioned in 1261 as Longavilla.

== Geography ==
Orges has an area, as of 2009, of 4 square kilometers (1.5 mi^{2}). Of this area, 3.25 km^{2} (1.25 mi^{2}) or 80.8% is used for agricultural purposes, while 0.53 km^{2} (0.20 mi^{2}) or 13.2% is forested. Of the rest of the land, 0.24 km^{2} (0.093 mi^{2}) or 6.0% is settled (buildings or roads).

Of the built up area, housing and buildings made up 2.5% and transportation infrastructure made up 2.7%. Out of the forested land, all of the forested land area is covered with heavy forests. Of the agricultural land, 70.9% is used for growing crops and 8.2% is pastures, while 1.7% is used for orchards or vine crops.

The municipality was part of the Yverdon District until it was dissolved on 31 August 2006, and Orges became part of the new district of Jura-Nord Vaudois.

The village is located on a high plateau above Lake Neuchatel and between the valleys of the L'Arnon and La Brine rivers. It consists of the village of Orges and the country estate of Longeville.

== Coat of arms ==
The blazon of the municipal coat of arms is Azure, three Barley stems Or. The barley (French: orge) is an example of canting arms.

== Demographics ==
Orges has a population (as of December 2020) of 343. As of 2008, 9.4% of the population are resident foreign nationals. Over the last 10 years (1999–2009 ) the population has changed at a rate of 19.5%. It has changed at a rate of 10% due to migration and at a rate of 9.5% due to births and deaths.

Most of the population (as of 2000) speaks French (187 or 92.1%) as their first language, with German being second most common (7 or 3.4%) and Portuguese being third (7 or 3.4%). There is 1 person who speaks Italian.

The age distribution, as of 2009, in Orges is; 29 children or 11.6% of the population are between 0 and 9 years old and 32 teenagers or 12.8% are between 10 and 19. Of the adult population, 23 people or 9.2% of the population are between 20 and 29 years old. 31 people or 12.4% are between 30 and 39, 45 people or 18.0% are between 40 and 49, and 38 people or 15.2% are between 50 and 59. The senior population distribution is 28 people or 11.2% of the population are between 60 and 69 years old, 15 people or 6.0% are between 70 and 79, there are 8 people or 3.2% who are between 80 and 89, and there is 1 person who is 90 and older.

As of 2000, there were 93 people who were single and never married in the village. There were 94 married individuals, 10 widows or widowers and 6 individuals who are divorced.

As of 2000, there were 88 private households in the village, and an average of 2.3 persons per household. There were 31 households that consist of only one person and 5 households with five or more people. Out of a total of 90 households that answered this question, 34.4% were households made up of just one person. Of the rest of the households, there are 26 married couples without children, 26 married couples with children There were 3 single parents with a child or children. There were 2 households that were made up of unrelated people and 2 households that were made up of some sort of institution or another collective housing.

In 2000 there were 37 single family homes (or 59.7% of the total) out of a total of 62 inhabited buildings. There were 14 multi-family buildings (22.6%), along with 10 multi-purpose buildings that were mostly used for housing (16.1%) and 1 other use buildings (commercial or industrial) that also had some housing (1.6%).

In 2000, a total of 82 apartments (82.8% of the total) were permanently occupied, while 11 apartments (11.1%) were seasonally occupied and 6 apartments (6.1%) were empty. As of 2009, the construction rate of new housing units was 0 new units per 1000 residents. The vacancy rate for the village, in 2010, was 0%.

The historical population is given in the following chart:

== Politics ==
In the 2007 federal election the most popular party was the SVP which received 30.41% of the vote. The next three most popular parties were the FDP (13.79%), the SP (11.44%) and the PdA Party (9.25%). In the federal election, a total of 72 votes were cast, and the voter turnout was 44.7%.

== Economy ==
As of 2010, Orges had an unemployment rate of 2.3%. As of 2008, there were 19 people employed in the primary economic sector and about 7 businesses involved in this sector. 45 people were employed in the secondary sector and there were 5 businesses in this sector. 31 people were employed in the tertiary sector, with 8 businesses in this sector. There were 105 residents of the village who were employed in some capacity, of which females made up 39.0% of the workforce.

In 2008 the total number of full-time equivalent jobs was 77. The number of jobs in the primary sector was 14, all of which were in agriculture. The number of jobs in the secondary sector was 39 of which 10 or (25.6%) were in manufacturing and 29 (74.4%) were in construction. The number of jobs in the tertiary sector was 24. In the tertiary sector; 5 or 20.8% were in wholesale or retail sales or the repair of motor vehicles, 2 or 8.3% were in the movement and storage of goods, 3 or 12.5% were in a hotel or restaurant, 3 or 12.5% were in the information industry, 5 or 20.8% were in education.

In 2000, there were 79 workers who commuted into the village and 64 workers who commuted away. The village is a net importer of workers, with about 1.2 workers entering the village for every one leaving. About 8.9% of the workforce coming into Orges are coming from outside Switzerland. Of the working population, 6.7% used public transportation to get to work, and 57.1% used a private car.

== Religion ==
From the 2000 census, 49 or 24.1% were Roman Catholic, while 123 or 60.6% belonged to the Swiss Reformed Church. Of the rest of the population, there were 14 individuals (or about 6.90% of the population) who belonged to another Christian church. There was 1 individual who was Jewish, and There was 1 person who was Buddhist. 20 (or about 9.85% of the population) belonged to no church, are agnostic or atheist, and 2 individuals (or about 0.99% of the population) did not answer the question.

== Education ==
In Orges about 81 or (39.9%) of the population have completed non-mandatory upper secondary education, and 23 or (11.3%) have completed additional higher education (either university or a Fachhochschule). Of the 23 who completed tertiary schooling, 47.8% were Swiss men, 43.5% were Swiss women.

In the 2009/2010 school year there were a total of 31 students in the Orges school district. In the Vaud cantonal school system, two years of non-obligatory pre-school are provided by the political districts. During the school year, the political district provided pre-school care for a total of 578 children of which 359 children (62.1%) received subsidized pre-school care. The canton's primary school program requires students to attend for four years. There were 12 students in the municipal primary school program. The obligatory lower secondary school program lasts for six years and there were 19 students in those schools.

As of 2000, there were 10 students in Orges who came from another village, while 35 residents attended schools outside the village.
