= Valeyres-sous-Montagny =

- Municipality
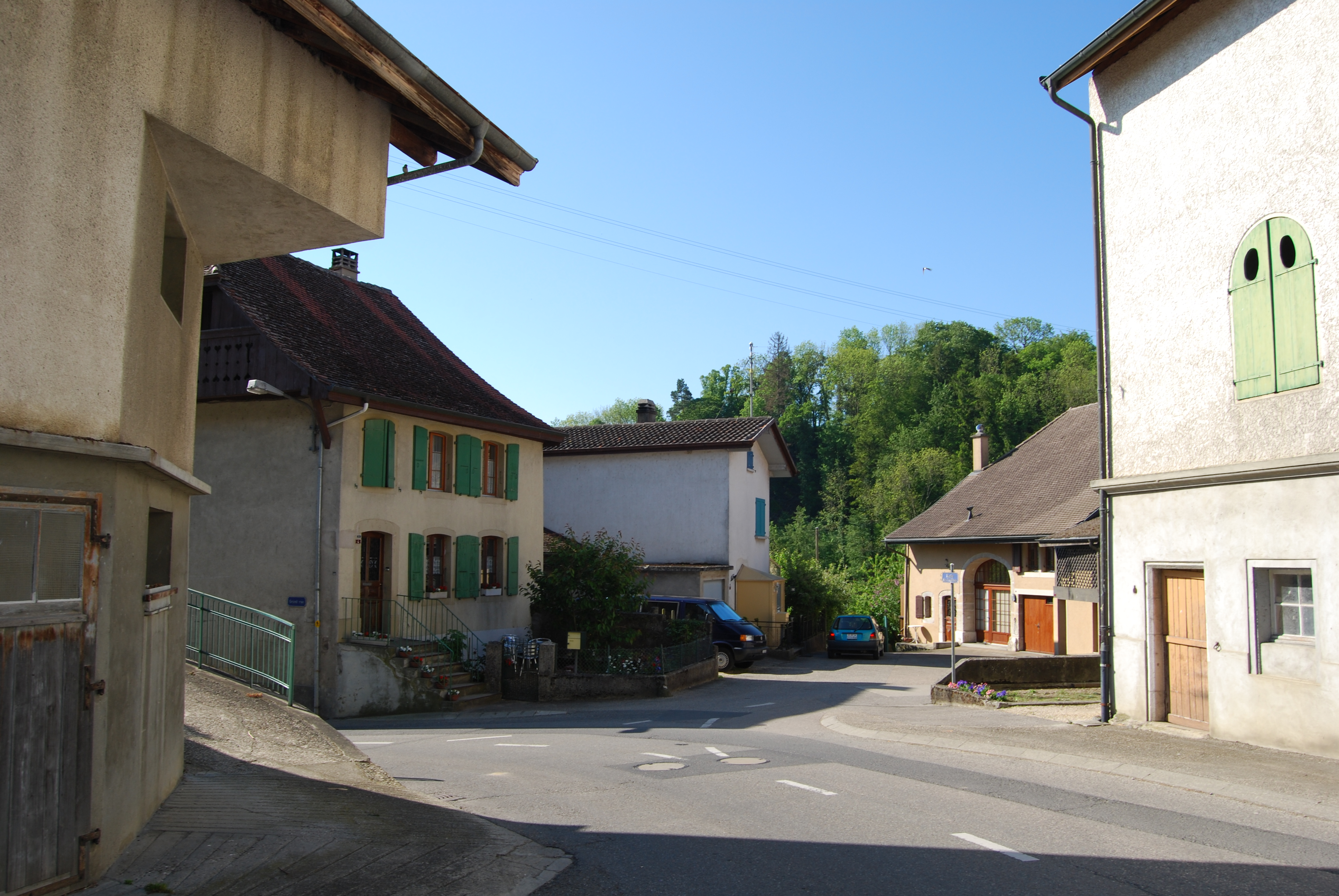

- Flag Coat of arms
- Location of Valeyres-sous-Montagny
- Location within Switzerland Location within Canton of Vaud
- Coordinates: 46°48′N 6°36′E
- Country: Switzerland
- Canton: Vaud
- District: Jura-Nord Vaudois

Government
  - Mayor: Syndic

Area
  - Total: 2.27 km^{2} (0.88 sq mi)
- Elevation: 471 m (1,545 ft)

Population (2003)
  - Total: 572
  - Density: 252/km^{2} (653/sq mi)
- Time zone: UTC+01:00 (CET)
  - Summer (DST): UTC+02:00 (CEST)
- Postal code: 1441
- SFOS number: 5933
- ISO 3166 code: CH-VD
- Surrounded by: Champvent, Essert-sous-Champvent, Giez, Grandson, Montagny-près-Yverdon, Orges
- Website: http://www.valeyres-sous-montagny.ch Profile (in French), SFSO statistics

Valeyres-sous-Montagny is a municipality in the district of Jura-Nord Vaudois of the canton of Vaud in Switzerland.

== History ==
Valeyres-sous-Montagny is first mentioned around 1139-48 as Valeriis.

== Geography ==
Valeyres-sous-Montagny has an area, as of 2009, of 2.3 square kilometers (0.89 mi^{2}). Of this area, 1.38 km^{2} (0.53 mi^{2}) or 60.5% is used for agricultural purposes, while 0.54 km^{2} (0.21 mi^{2}) or 23.7% is forested. Of the rest of the land, 0.37 km^{2} (0.14 mi^{2}) or 16.2% is settled (buildings or roads).

Of the built up area, housing and buildings made up 6.1% and transportation infrastructure made up 7.0%. Power and water infrastructure as well as other special developed areas made up 2.2% of the area Out of the forested land, all of the forested land area is covered with heavy forests. Of the agricultural land, 46.1% is used for growing crops and 11.8% is pastures, while 2.6% is used for orchards or vine crops.

The municipality was part of the Yverdon District until it was dissolved on 31 August 2006, and Valeyres-sous-Montagny became part of the new district of Jura-Nord Vaudois.

The municipality is located on the left bank of the Brine river, north-west of Yverdon-les-Bains.

== Coat of arms ==
The blazon of the municipal coat of arms is Azure, a Bend wavy Argent, in chief a Hand Or, in base a Trefoil of the same.

== Demographics ==
Valeyres-sous-Montagny has a population (as of December 2020) of 713. As of 2008, 15.0% of the population are resident foreign nationals. Over the last 10 years (1999–2009) the population has changed at a rate of 25%. It has changed at a rate of 21.7% due to migration and at a rate of 2.5% due to births and deaths.

Most of the population (as of 2000) speaks French (501 or 93.8%) as their first language, with German being second most common (14 or 2.6%) and Italian being third (12 or 2.2%).

The age distribution, as of 2009, in Valeyres-sous-Montagny is; 69 children or 10.6% of the population are between 0 and 9 years old and 85 teenagers or 13.1% are between 10 and 19. Of the adult population, 82 people or 12.6% of the population are between 20 and 29 years old. 83 people or 12.7% are between 30 and 39, 122 people or 18.7% are between 40 and 49, and 76 people or 11.7% are between 50 and 59. The senior population distribution is 66 people or 10.1% of the population are between 60 and 69 years old, 43 people or 6.6% are between 70 and 79, there are 20 people or 3.1% who are between 80 and 89, and there are 5 people or 0.8% who are 90 and older.

As of 2000, there were 202 people who were single and never married in the municipality. There were 274 married individuals, 24 widows or widowers and 34 individuals who are divorced.

As of 2000, there were 214 private households in the municipality, and an average of 2.4 persons per household. There were 52 households that consist of only one person and 14 households with five or more people. Out of a total of 220 households that answered this question, 23.6% were households made up of just one person and there were 3 adults who lived with their parents. Of the rest of the households, there are 73 married couples without children, 73 married couples with children There were 8 single parents with a child or children. There were 5 households that were made up of unrelated people and 6 households that were made up of some sort of institution or another collective housing.

In 2000 there were 110 single family homes (or 67.9% of the total) out of a total of 162 inhabited buildings. There were 27 multi-family buildings (16.7%), along with 15 multi-purpose buildings that were mostly used for housing (9.3%) and 10 other use buildings (commercial or industrial) that also had some housing (6.2%).

In 2000, a total of 191 apartments (95.5% of the total) were permanently occupied, while 9 apartments (4.5%) were seasonally occupied. As of 2009, the construction rate of new housing units was 4.6 new units per 1000 residents. The vacancy rate for the municipality, in 2010, was 0.46%.

The historical population is given in the following chart:

== Politics ==
In the 2007 federal election the most popular party was the SVP which received 27.48% of the vote. The next three most popular parties were the SP (17.82%), the Green Party (15.88%) and the FDP (12.93%). In the federal election, a total of 165 votes were cast, and the voter turnout was 40.1%.

== Notable people ==
- Léna Bühler (born 1997), racing driver

== Economy ==
As of 2010, Valeyres-sous-Montagny had an unemployment rate of 4.7%. As of 2008, there were 19 people employed in the primary economic sector and about 5 businesses involved in this sector. 42 people were employed in the secondary sector and there were 6 businesses in this sector. 30 people were employed in the tertiary sector, with 9 businesses in this sector. There were 272 residents of the municipality who were employed in some capacity, of which females made up 43.0% of the workforce.

In 2008 the total number of full-time equivalent jobs was 75. The number of jobs in the primary sector was 13, all of which were in agriculture. The number of jobs in the secondary sector was 41 of which 15 or (36.6%) were in manufacturing and 26 (63.4%) were in construction. The number of jobs in the tertiary sector was 21. In the tertiary sector; 1 was in the movement and storage of goods, 5 or 23.8% were in a hotel or restaurant, 1 was in the information industry, 3 or 14.3% were technical professionals or scientists, 4 or 19.0% were in education and 1 was in health care.

In 2000, there were 60 workers who commuted into the municipality and 227 workers who commuted away. The municipality is a net exporter of workers, with about 3.8 workers leaving the municipality for every one entering. About 6.7% of the workforce coming into Valeyres-sous-Montagny are coming from outside Switzerland. Of the working population, 12.5% used public transportation to get to work, and 70.6% used a private car.

== Transport ==
The meter gauge electric Yverdon–Ste-Croix railway line links Valeyres-sous-Montagny with Yverdon-les-Bains and Sainte Croix.

== Religion ==
From the 2000 census, 153 or 28.7% were Roman Catholic, while 258 or 48.3% belonged to the Swiss Reformed Church. Of the rest of the population, there were 3 members of an Orthodox church (or about 0.56% of the population), and there were 22 individuals (or about 4.12% of the population) who belonged to another Christian church. There were 3 (or about 0.56% of the population) who were Islamic. There were 2 individuals who were Buddhist and 1 individual who belonged to another church. 88 (or about 16.48% of the population) belonged to no church, are agnostic or atheist, and 15 individuals (or about 2.81% of the population) did not answer the question.

== Education ==
In Valeyres-sous-Montagny about 197 or (36.9%) of the population have completed non-mandatory upper secondary education, and 82 or (15.4%) have completed additional higher education (either university or a Fachhochschule). Of the 82 who completed tertiary schooling, 53.7% were Swiss men, 30.5% were Swiss women, 12.2% were non-Swiss men.

In the 2009/2010 school year there were a total of 85 students in the Valeyres-sous-Montagny school district. In the Vaud cantonal school system, two years of non-obligatory pre-school are provided by the political districts. During the school year, the political district provided pre-school care for a total of 578 children of which 359 children (62.1%) received subsidized pre-school care. The canton's primary school program requires students to attend for four years. There were 46 students in the municipal primary school program. The obligatory lower secondary school program lasts for six years and there were 35 students in those schools. There were also 4 students who were home schooled or attended another non-traditional school.

As of 2000, there were 49 students in Valeyres-sous-Montagny who came from another municipality, while 79 residents attended schools outside the municipality.
