= Fontaines-sur-Grandson =

- Municipality
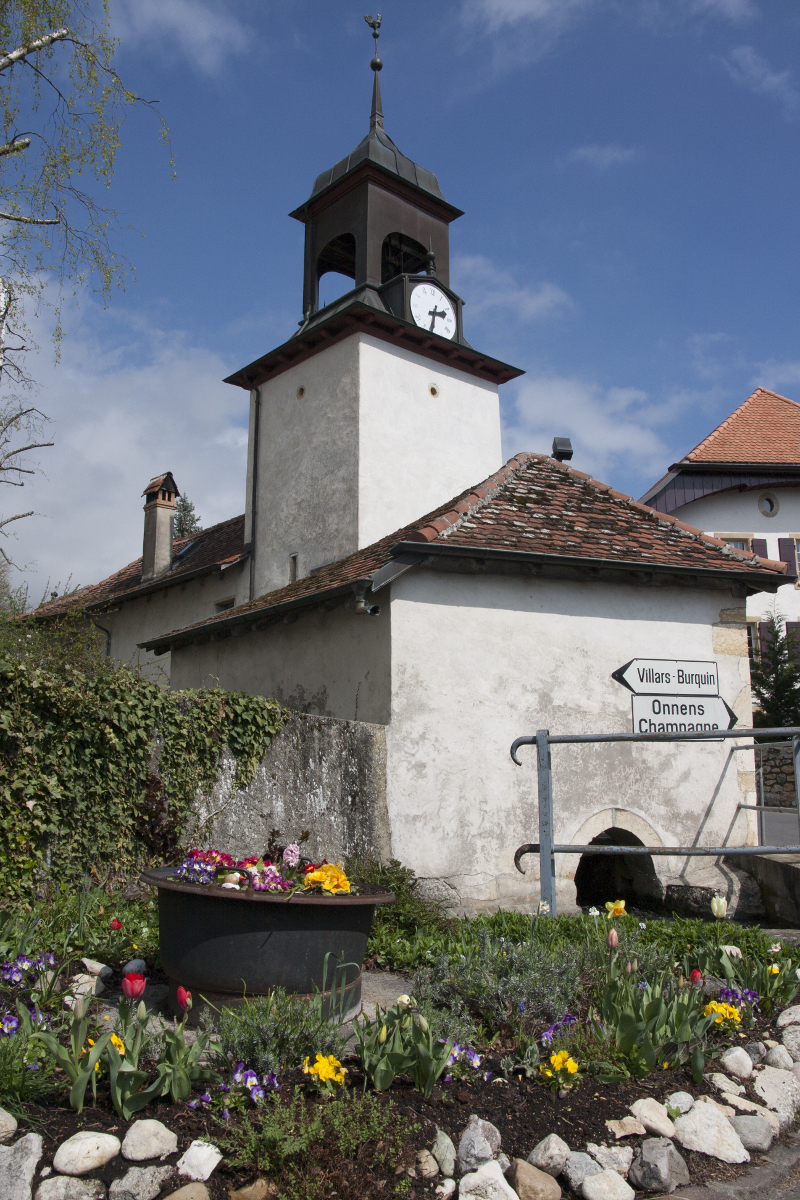
- Center of the village

- Flag Coat of arms
- Location of Fontaines-sur-Grandson
- Location within Switzerland Location within Canton of Vaud
- Coordinates: 46°50′N 06°37′E
- Country: Switzerland
- Canton: Vaud
- District: Jura-Nord Vaudois

Government
  - Mayor: Syndic; Jean-Jacques Thorens

Area
  - Total: 7.85 km^{2} (3.03 sq mi)
- Elevation: 568 m (1,864 ft)

Population (2004)
  - Total: 140
  - Density: 18/km^{2} (46/sq mi)
- Demonym: Lè z'Affamâ
- Time zone: UTC+01:00 (CET)
  - Summer (DST): UTC+02:00 (CEST)
- Postal code: 1421
- SFOS number: 5557
- ISO 3166 code: CH-VD
- Surrounded by: Fleurier (NE), Mauborget, Villars-Burquin, Vaugondry, Champagne, Fiez, Giez, Novalles, Grandevent, Bullet, Buttes (NE)
- Website: fontaines-sur-grandson.ch

Fontaines-sur-Grandson is a municipality in the district of Jura-Nord Vaudois in the canton of Vaud in Switzerland.

== History ==
Fontaines-sur-Grandson is first mentioned in 1011 as Fontanes.

== Geography ==
Fontaines-sur-Grandson has an area, as of 2009, of 7.85 square kilometers (3.03 sq mi). Of this area, 3.73 km^{2} (1.44 sq mi) or 47.5% is used for agricultural purposes, while 3.97 km^{2} (1.53 sq mi) or 50.6% is forested. Of the rest of the land, 0.19 km^{2} (0.073 sq mi) or 2.4% is settled (buildings or roads), 0.01 km^{2} (2.5 acres) or 0.1% is either rivers or lakes and 0.02 km^{2} (4.9 acres) or 0.3% is unproductive land.

Of the built up area, housing and buildings made up 0.9% and transportation infrastructure made up 1.4%. Out of the forested land, 46.0% of the total land area is heavily forested and 4.6% is covered with orchards or small clusters of trees. Of the agricultural land, 19.6% is used for growing crops and 6.9% is pastures and 20.8% is used for alpine pastures. All the water in the municipality is in lakes.

The municipality was part of the Grandson District until it was dissolved on 31 August 2006, and Fontaines-sur-Grandson became part of the new district of Jura-Nord Vaudois.

The municipality stretches between the foot of the Jura Mountains and the border with the Canton of Neuchatel. It includes seasonal alpine herding camps around Chasseron mountain.

== Coat of arms ==
The blazon of the municipal coat of arms is Argent, fours Pales wavy Azure, chief Or masoned Sable.

== Demographics ==
Fontaines-sur-Grandson has a population (as of December 2020) of 219. As of 2008, 8.9% of the population are resident foreign nationals. Over the last 10 years (1999–2009) the population has changed at a rate of 8.4%. It has changed at a rate of 8.4% due to migration and at a rate of 0% due to births and deaths.

Most of the population (as of 2000) speaks French (113 or 85.6%), with German being second most common (18 or 13.6%) and Russisch being third (1 or 0.8%).

Of the population in the municipality 34 or about 25.8% were born in Fontaines-sur-Grandson and lived there in 2000. There were 42 or 31.8% who were born in the same canton, while 38 or 28.8% were born somewhere else in Switzerland, and 14 or 10.6% were born outside of Switzerland.

In 2008 there was 1 live birth to Swiss citizens and 1 death of a Swiss citizen. Ignoring immigration and emigration, the population of Swiss citizens remained the same while the foreign population remained the same. The total Swiss population change in 2008 (from all sources, including moves across municipal borders) was a decrease of 2 and the non-Swiss population increased by 2 people. This represents a population growth rate of 0.0%.

The age distribution, as of 2009, in Fontaines-sur-Grandson is; 18 children or 12.7% of the population are between 0 and 9 years old and 21 teenagers or 14.8% are between 10 and 19. Of the adult population, 11 people or 7.7% of the population are between 20 and 29 years old. 19 people or 13.4% are between 30 and 39, 27 people or 19.0% are between 40 and 49, and 18 people or 12.7% are between 50 and 59. The senior population distribution is 16 people or 11.3% of the population are between 60 and 69 years old, 6 people or 4.2% are between 70 and 79, there are 6 people or 4.2% who are between 80 and 89.

As of 2000, there were 54 people who were single and never married in the municipality. There were 56 married individuals, 10 widows or widowers and 12 individuals who are divorced.

As of 2000, there were 56 private households in the municipality, and an average of 2.3 persons per household. There were 23 households that consist of only one person and 6 households with five or more people. Out of a total of 60 households that answered this question, 38.3% were households made up of just one person. Of the rest of the households, there are 11 married couples without children, 18 married couples with children There were 3 single parents with a child or children. There was 1 household that was made up of unrelated people and 4 households that were made up of some sort of institution or another collective housing.

In 2000 there were 23 single family homes (or 54.8% of the total) out of a total of 42 inhabited buildings. There were 10 multi-family buildings (23.8%), along with 6 multi-purpose buildings that were mostly used for housing (14.3%) and 3 other use buildings (commercial or industrial) that also had some housing (7.1%). Of the single family homes 12 were built before 1919. The most multi-family homes (9) were built before 1919 and the next most (1) were built between 1981 and 1990.

In 2000 there were 64 apartments in the municipality. The most common apartment size was 5 rooms of which there were 16. There were 2 single room apartments and 32 apartments with five or more rooms. Of these apartments, a total of 52 apartments (81.3% of the total) were permanently occupied, while 11 apartments (17.2%) were seasonally occupied and one apartment was empty. As of 2009, the construction rate of new housing units was 0 new units per 1000 residents. The vacancy rate for the municipality, in 2010, was 0%.

The historical population is given in the following chart:

== Sights ==
The entire village of Fontaines-sur-Grandson is designated as part of the Inventory of Swiss Heritage Sites.

== Politics ==
In the 2007 federal election the most popular party was the SVP which received 45.63% of the vote. The next three most popular parties were the FDP (17.6%), the Green Party (12.99%) and the SP (10.56%). In the federal election, a total of 48 votes were cast, and the voter turnout was 50.5%.

== Economy ==
As of 2010, Fontaines-sur-Grandson had an unemployment rate of 3.4%. As of 2008, there were 13 people employed in the primary economic sector and about 5 businesses involved in this sector. 3 people were employed in the secondary sector and there was 1 business in this sector. 2 people were employed in the tertiary sector, with 2 businesses in this sector. There were 69 residents of the municipality who were employed in some capacity, of which females made up 50.7% of the workforce.

In 2008 the total number of full-time equivalent jobs was 13. The number of jobs in the primary sector was 8, all of which were in agriculture. The number of jobs in the secondary sector was 3, all of which were in construction. The number of jobs in the tertiary sector was 2. In the tertiary sector; 1 was in the sale or repair of motor vehicles, .

In 2000, there were 4 workers who commuted into the municipality and 49 workers who commuted away. The municipality is a net exporter of workers, with about 12.3 workers leaving the municipality for every one entering. Of the working population, 8.7% used public transportation to get to work, and 63.8% used a private car.

== Religion ==
From the 2000 census, 19 or 14.4% were Roman Catholic, while 85 or 64.4% belonged to the Swiss Reformed Church. Of the rest of the population, there were 2 members of an Orthodox church (or about 1.52% of the population). 20 (or about 15.15% of the population) belonged to no church, are agnostic or atheist, and 6 individuals (or about 4.55% of the population) did not answer the question.

== Education ==
In Fontaines-sur-Grandson about 47 or (35.6%) of the population have completed non-mandatory upper secondary education, and 17 or (12.9%) have completed additional higher education (either university or a Fachhochschule). Of the 17 who completed tertiary schooling, 64.7% were Swiss men, 29.4% were Swiss women.

In the 2009/2010 school year there were a total of 20 students in the Fontaines-sur-Grandson school district. In the Vaud cantonal school system, two years of non-obligatory pre-school are provided by the political districts. During the school year, the political district provided pre-school care for a total of 578 children of which 359 children (62.1%) received subsidized pre-school care. The canton's primary school program requires students to attend for four years. There were 12 students in the municipal primary school program. The obligatory lower secondary school program lasts for six years and there were 8 students in those schools.

As of 2000, there were 16 students in Fontaines-sur-Grandson who came from another municipality, while 24 residents attended schools outside the municipality.
