= Fiez =

- Municipality
- Flag Coat of arms
- Location of Fiez
- Location within Switzerland Location within Canton of Vaud
- Coordinates: 46°50′N 6°37′E
- Country: Switzerland
- Canton: Vaud
- District: Jura-Nord Vaudois

Government
  - Mayor: Syndic

Area
  - Total: 6.84 km^{2} (2.64 sq mi)
- Elevation: 520 m (1,710 ft)

Population (2003)
  - Total: 372
  - Density: 54.4/km^{2} (141/sq mi)
- Time zone: UTC+01:00 (CET)
  - Summer (DST): UTC+02:00 (CEST)
- Postal code: 1420
- SFOS number: 5556
- ISO 3166 code: CH-VD
- Surrounded by: Bullet, Buttes (NE), Champagne, Fontaines-sur-Grandson, Giez, Grandson, La Côte-aux-Fées (NE), Sainte-Croix
- Website: fiez.ch

Fiez is a municipality in the district of Jura-Nord Vaudois in the canton of Vaud in Switzerland.

== History ==
Fiez is first mentioned in 885 as Figiaco.

== Geography ==
Fiez has an area, as of 2009, of 6.84 square kilometers (2.64 sq mi). Of this area, 4.23 km^{2} (1.63 sq mi) or 61.8% is used for agricultural purposes, while 2.37 km^{2} (0.92 sq mi) or 34.6% is forested. Of the rest of the land, 0.2 km^{2} (0.077 sq mi) or 2.9% is settled (buildings or roads), 0.02 km^{2} (4.9 acres) or 0.3% is either rivers or lakes and 0.01 km^{2} (2.5 acres) or 0.1% is unproductive land.

Of the built up area, housing and buildings made up 1.5% and transportation infrastructure made up 1.3%. Out of the forested land, 28.4% of the total land area is heavily forested and 6.3% is covered with orchards or small clusters of trees. Of the agricultural land, 24.7% is used for growing crops and 3.1% is pastures, while 2.5% is used for orchards or vine crops and 31.6% is used for alpine pastures. All the water in the municipality is flowing water.

The municipality was part of the Grandson District until it was dissolved on 31 August 2006, and Fiez became part of the new district of Jura-Nord Vaudois.

The municipality is located at the foot of the Jura Mountains on the right bank of the Arnon river. In addition to the land around the main village, it also includes an exclave north of Chasseron mountain, with multiple seasonal herding camps.

== Coat of arms ==
The blazon of the municipal coat of arms is Azure, a Bend wavy Argent between two Arrow Points bendwise of the same.

== Demographics ==
Fiez has a population (as of December 2020) of 451. As of 2008, 11.5% of the population are resident foreign nationals. The population grew by 18.8% between 1999 and 2009; migration accounted for 11.8% of this growth.

Most of the population (as of 2000) speaks French (322 or 93.3%), with German being second most common (10 or 2.9%) and Spanish being third (5 or 1.4%). There is 1 person who speaks Italian.

Of the population in the municipality 91 or about 26.4% were born in Fiez and lived there in 2000. There were 157 or 45.5% who were born in the same canton, while 48 or 13.9% were born somewhere else in Switzerland, and 39 or 11.3% were born outside of Switzerland.

In 2008 there were 4 live births to Swiss citizens and 1 birth to non-Swiss citizens, and in same time span there was 1 death of a Swiss citizen. Ignoring immigration and emigration, the population of Swiss citizens increased by 3 while the foreign population increased by 1. At the same time, there were 2 non-Swiss men and 1 non-Swiss woman who immigrated from another country to Switzerland. The total Swiss population change in 2008 (from all sources, including moves across municipal borders) was an increase of 20 and the non-Swiss population increased by 8 people. This represents a population growth rate of 7.7%.

The age distribution, as of 2009, in Fiez is; 58 children or 14.1% of the population are between 0 and 9 years old and 60 teenagers or 14.6% are between 10 and 19. Of the adult population, 39 people or 9.5% of the population are between 20 and 29 years old. 66 people or 16.1% are between 30 and 39, 62 people or 15.1% are between 40 and 49, and 56 people or 13.6% are between 50 and 59. The senior population distribution is 48 people or 11.7% of the population are between 60 and 69 years old, 10 people or 2.4% are between 70 and 79, there are 11 people or 2.7% who are between 80 and 89, and there is 1 person who is 90 and older.

As of 2000, there were 159 people who were single and never married in the municipality. There were 156 married individuals, 14 widows or widowers and 16 individuals who are divorced.

As of 2000, there were 128 private households in the municipality, and an average of 2.7 persons per household. There were 28 households that consist of only one person and 15 households with five or more people. Out of a total of 131 households that answered this question, 21.4% were households made up of just one person. Of the rest of the households, there are 36 married couples without children, 48 married couples with children There were 12 single parents with a child or children. There were 4 households that were made up of unrelated people and 3 households that were made up of some sort of institution or another collective housing.

In 2000 there were 57 single family homes (or 64.0% of the total) out of a total of 89 inhabited buildings. There were 14 multi-family buildings (15.7%), along with 13 multi-purpose buildings that were mostly used for housing (14.6%) and 5 other use buildings (commercial or industrial) that also had some housing (5.6%). Of the single family homes 18 were built before 1919, while 9 were built between 1990 and 2000. The greatest number of single family homes (20) were built between 1981 and 1990. The most multi-family homes (7) were built before 1919 and the next most (3) were built between 1961 and 1970.

In 2000 there were 134 apartments in the municipality. The most common apartment size was 3 rooms of which there were 34. There were 7 single room apartments and 62 apartments with five or more rooms. Of these apartments, a total of 125 apartments (93.3% of the total) were permanently occupied, while 5 apartments (3.7%) were seasonally occupied and 4 apartments (3.0%) were empty. As of 2009, the construction rate of new housing units was 7.3 new units per 1000 residents. The vacancy rate for the municipality, in 2010, was 1.29%.

The historical population is given in the following chart:

== Sights ==
The entire village of Fiez is designated as part of the Inventory of Swiss Heritage Sites.

== Politics ==
In the 2007 federal election the most popular party was the SP which received 26.64% of the vote. The next three most popular parties were the FDP (20.58%), the SVP (19.45%) and the Green Party (17.73%). In the federal election, a total of 118 votes were cast, and the voter turnout was 50.0%.

== Economy ==
As of 2010, Fiez had an unemployment rate of 2.4%. As of 2008, there were 15 people employed in the primary economic sector and about 6 businesses involved in this sector. 16 people were employed in the secondary sector and there were 4 businesses in this sector. 24 people were employed in the tertiary sector, with 9 businesses in this sector. There were 189 residents of the municipality who were employed in some capacity, of which females made up 45.0% of the workforce.

In 2008 the total number of full-time equivalent jobs was 48. The number of jobs in the primary sector was 12, all of which were in agriculture. The number of jobs in the secondary sector was 15, all of which were in manufacturing. The number of jobs in the tertiary sector was 21. In the tertiary sector; 8 or 38.1% were in wholesale or retail sales or the repair of motor vehicles, 1 was in the movement and storage of goods, 6 or 28.6% were in a hotel or restaurant, 1 was a technical professional or scientist, 4 or 19.0% were in education.

In 2000, there were 14 workers who commuted into the municipality and 164 workers who commuted away. The municipality is a net exporter of workers, with about 11.7 workers leaving the municipality for every one entering. Of the working population, 7.4% used public transportation to get to work, and 77.8% used a private car.

== Religion ==
From the 2000 census, 44 or 12.8% were Roman Catholic, while 226 or 65.5% belonged to the Swiss Reformed Church. Of the rest of the population, there were 2 members of an Orthodox church (or about 0.58% of the population), and there were 4 individuals (or about 1.16% of the population) who belonged to another Christian church. There were 2 (or about 0.58% of the population) who were Islamic. 48 (or about 13.91% of the population) belonged to no church, are agnostic or atheist, and 21 individuals (or about 6.09% of the population) did not answer the question.

== Education ==
In Fiez about 134 or (38.8%) of the population have completed non-mandatory upper secondary education, and 54 or (15.7%) have completed additional higher education (either university or a Fachhochschule). Of the 54 who completed tertiary schooling, 59.3% were Swiss men, 24.1% were Swiss women, 9.3% were non-Swiss men.

In the 2009/2010 school year there were a total of 74 students in the Fiez school district. In the Vaud cantonal school system, two years of non-obligatory pre-school are provided by the political districts. During the school year, the political district provided pre-school care for a total of 578 children of which 359 children (62.1%) received subsidized pre-school care. The canton's primary school program requires students to attend for four years. There were 46 students in the municipal primary school program. The obligatory lower secondary school program lasts for six years and there were 28 students in those schools.

As of 2000, there were 26 students in Fiez who came from another municipality, while 52 residents attended schools outside the municipality.

== Notable people ==
- Pierre Gilliard (1879–1962), Swiss academic and writer who served as the French language tutor to the children of Nicholas II of Russia.
