= La Côte-aux-Fées =

- Municipality
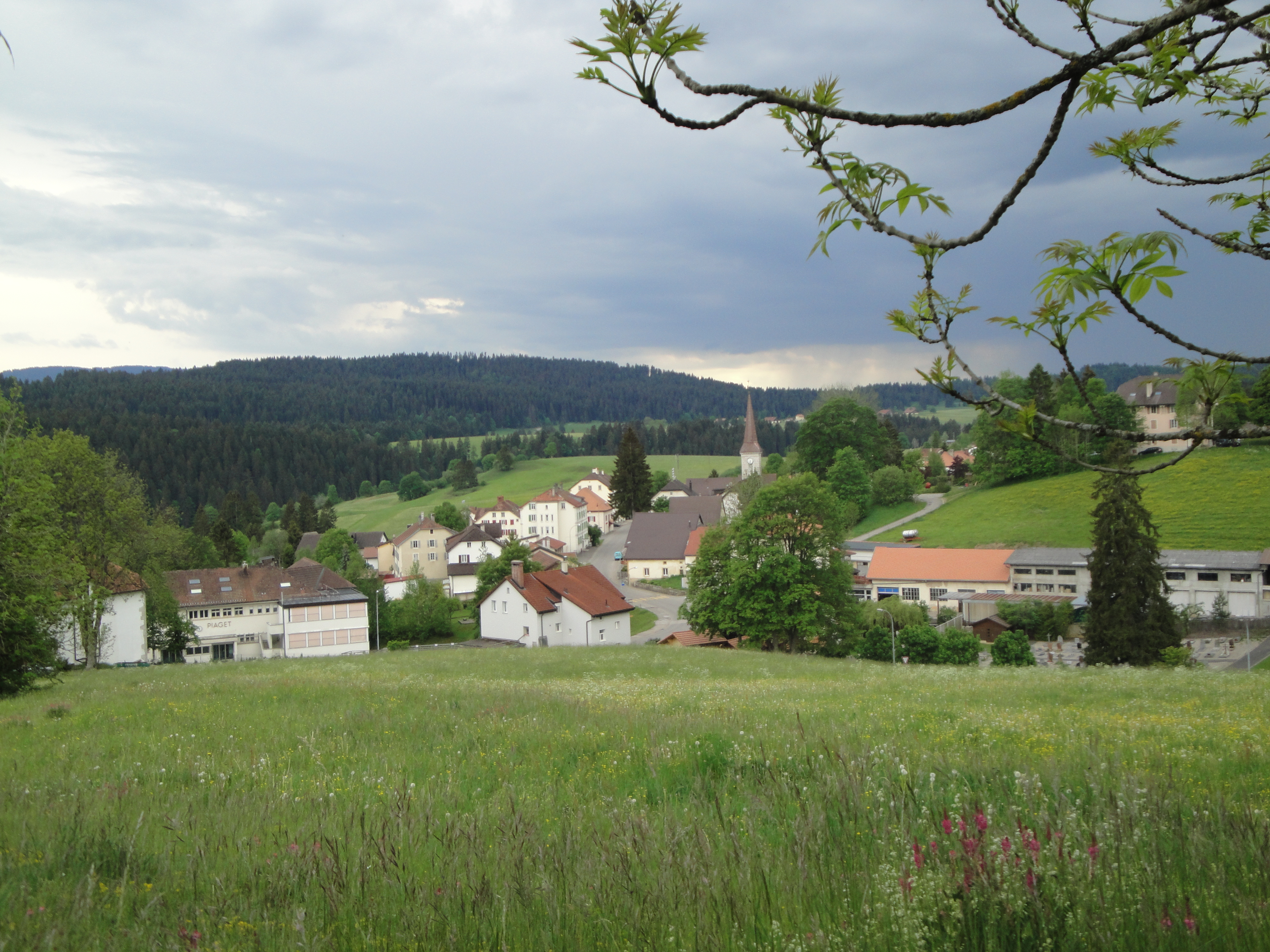
- View of La Côte-aux-Fées from North-East

- Coat of arms
- Location of La Côte-aux-Fées
- Location within Switzerland Location within Canton of Neuchâtel
- Coordinates: 46°52′N 6°29′E
- Country: Switzerland
- Canton: Neuchâtel

Area
  - Total: 12.85 km^{2} (4.96 sq mi)
- Elevation: 1,041 m (3,415 ft)

Population (December 2007)
  - Total: 469
  - Density: 36.5/km^{2} (94.5/sq mi)
- Time zone: UTC+01:00 (CET)
  - Summer (DST): UTC+02:00 (CEST)
- Postal code: 2117
- SFOS number: 6504
- ISO 3166 code: CH-NE
- Surrounded by: Buttes, Fiez (VD), Les Fourgs (FR-25), Les Verrières, Sainte-Croix (VD), Verrières-de-Joux (FR-25)
- Website: http://www.lacote-aux-fees.ch SFSO statistics

La Côte-aux-Fées (French pronunciation: [la kot o fe]) is a municipality in the canton of Neuchâtel in Switzerland.

== History ==
La Côte-aux-Fées is first mentioned in 1337 as La Costa des Faies.

== Geography ==
Aerial view (1964)

La Côte-aux-Fées has an area, as of 2009, of 12.9 square kilometers (5.0 mi^{2}). Of this area, 7.15 km^{2} (2.76 mi^{2}) or 55.6% is used for agricultural purposes, while 5.27 km^{2} (2.03 mi^{2}) or 41.0% is forested. Of the rest of the land, 0.39 km^{2} (0.15 mi^{2}) or 3.0% is settled (buildings or roads), 0.01 km^{2} (2.5 acres) or 0.1% is either rivers or lakes and 0.04 km^{2} (9.9 acres) or 0.3% is unproductive land.

Of the built up area, housing and buildings made up 1.9% and transportation infrastructure made up 0.5%. Out of the forested land, 35.8% of the total land area is heavily forested and 5.2% is covered with orchards or small clusters of trees. Of the agricultural land, 36.5% is pastures and 19.1% is used for alpine pastures. All the water in the municipality is in lakes.

The municipality was in the district of Val-de-Travers, until the district level was eliminated on 1 January 2018. It consists of about a dozen hamlets, the most important of which is Les Bolles-du-Temple.

== Coat of arms ==
The blazon of the municipal coat of arms is Azure, a Lamb Argent passant on a base Vert. This is an example of canting since the old version of the name is Coste eis Faes or hill of the lambs.

== Demographics ==
La Côte-aux-Fées has a population (as of December 2020) of 458. As of 2008, 8.2% of the population are resident foreign nationals. Over the last 10 years (2000–2010) the population has changed at a rate of -13.6%. Migration accounted for -6.7%, while births and deaths accounted for -3.3%.

Most of the population (as of 2000) speaks French (496 or 93.8%) as their first language, German is the second most common (22 or 4.2%) and Portuguese is the third (7 or 1.3%). There are 2 people who speak Italian.

As of 2008, the population was 50.3% male and 49.7% female. The population was made up of 212 Swiss men (46.8% of the population) and 16 (3.5%) non-Swiss men. There were 208 Swiss women (45.9%) and 17 (3.8%) non-Swiss women. Of the population in the municipality, 160 or about 30.2% were born in La Côte-aux-Fées and lived there in 2000. There were 132 or 25.0% who were born in the same canton, while 142 or 26.8% were born somewhere else in Switzerland, and 64 or 12.1% were born outside of Switzerland.

As of 2000, children and teenagers (0–19 years old) make up 18.3% of the population, while adults (20–64 years old) make up 56.7% and seniors (over 64 years old) make up 25%.

As of 2000, there were 195 people who were single and never married in the municipality. There were 246 married individuals, 54 widows or widowers and 34 individuals who are divorced.

As of 2000, there were 219 private households in the municipality, and an average of 2.1 persons per household. There were 85 households that consist of only one person and 13 households with five or more people. In 2000, a total of 216 apartments (75.0% of the total) were permanently occupied, while 54 apartments (18.8%) were seasonally occupied and 18 apartments (6.3%) were empty. The vacancy rate for the municipality, in 2010, was 1.02%.

The historical population is given in the following chart:

== Politics ==
In the 2007 federal election the most popular party was the SVP which received 41.96% of the vote. The next three most popular parties were the SP (16.07%), the FDP (12.69%) and the LPS Party (11.51%). In the federal election, a total of 248 votes were cast, and the voter turnout was 64.6%.

== Economy ==
As of 2010, La Côte-aux-Fées had an unemployment rate of 3.1%. As of 2008, there were 35 people employed in the primary economic sector and about 16 businesses involved in this sector. 151 people were employed in the secondary sector and there were 12 businesses in this sector. 140 people were employed in the tertiary sector, with 19 businesses in this sector. There were 241 residents of the municipality who were employed in some capacity, of which females made up 42.3% of the workforce.

In 2008 the total number of full-time equivalent jobs was 279. The number of jobs in the primary sector was 29, all of which were in agriculture. The number of jobs in the secondary sector was 144 of which 136 or (94.4%) were in manufacturing and 8 (5.6%) were in construction. The number of jobs in the tertiary sector was 106. In the tertiary sector; 16 or 15.1% were in wholesale or retail sales or the repair of motor vehicles, 6 or 5.7% were in the movement and storage of goods, 4 or 3.8% were in a hotel or restaurant, 2 or 1.9% were the insurance or financial industry, 1 was a technical professional or scientist, 2 or 1.9% were in education and 57 or 53.8% were in health care.

In 2000, there were 219 workers who commuted into the municipality and 91 workers who commuted away. The municipality is a net importer of workers, with about 2.4 workers entering the municipality for every one leaving. About 16.4% of the workforce coming into La Côte-aux-Fées are coming from outside Switzerland. Of the working population, 7.9% used public transportation to get to work, and 47.3% used a private car.

== Religion ==
From the 2000 census, 59 or 11.2% were Roman Catholic, while 278 or 52.6% belonged to the Swiss Reformed Church. Of the rest of the population, there was 1 member of an Orthodox church, and there were 170 individuals (or about 32.14% of the population) who belonged to another Christian church. There were 2 individuals who belonged to another church. 78 (or about 14.74% of the population) belonged to no church, are agnostic or atheist, and 25 individuals (or about 4.73% of the population) did not answer the question.

== Education ==
In La Côte-aux-Fées about 163 or (30.8%) of the population have completed non-mandatory upper secondary education, and 58 or (11.0%) have completed additional higher education (either university or a Fachhochschule). Of the 58 who completed tertiary schooling, 55.2% were Swiss men, 29.3% were Swiss women, 10.3% were non-Swiss men.

In the canton of Neuchâtel most municipalities provide two years of non-mandatory kindergarten, followed by five years of mandatory primary education. The next four years of mandatory secondary education is provided at thirteen larger secondary schools, which many students travel out of their home municipality to attend. During the 2010–11 school year, there were 0.5 kindergarten classes with a total of 8 students in La Côte-aux-Fées. In the same year, there was one primary class with a total of 17 students.

As of 2000, there were 15 students in La Côte-aux-Fées who came from another municipality, while 31 residents attended schools outside the municipality.
