= Novalles =

- Municipality
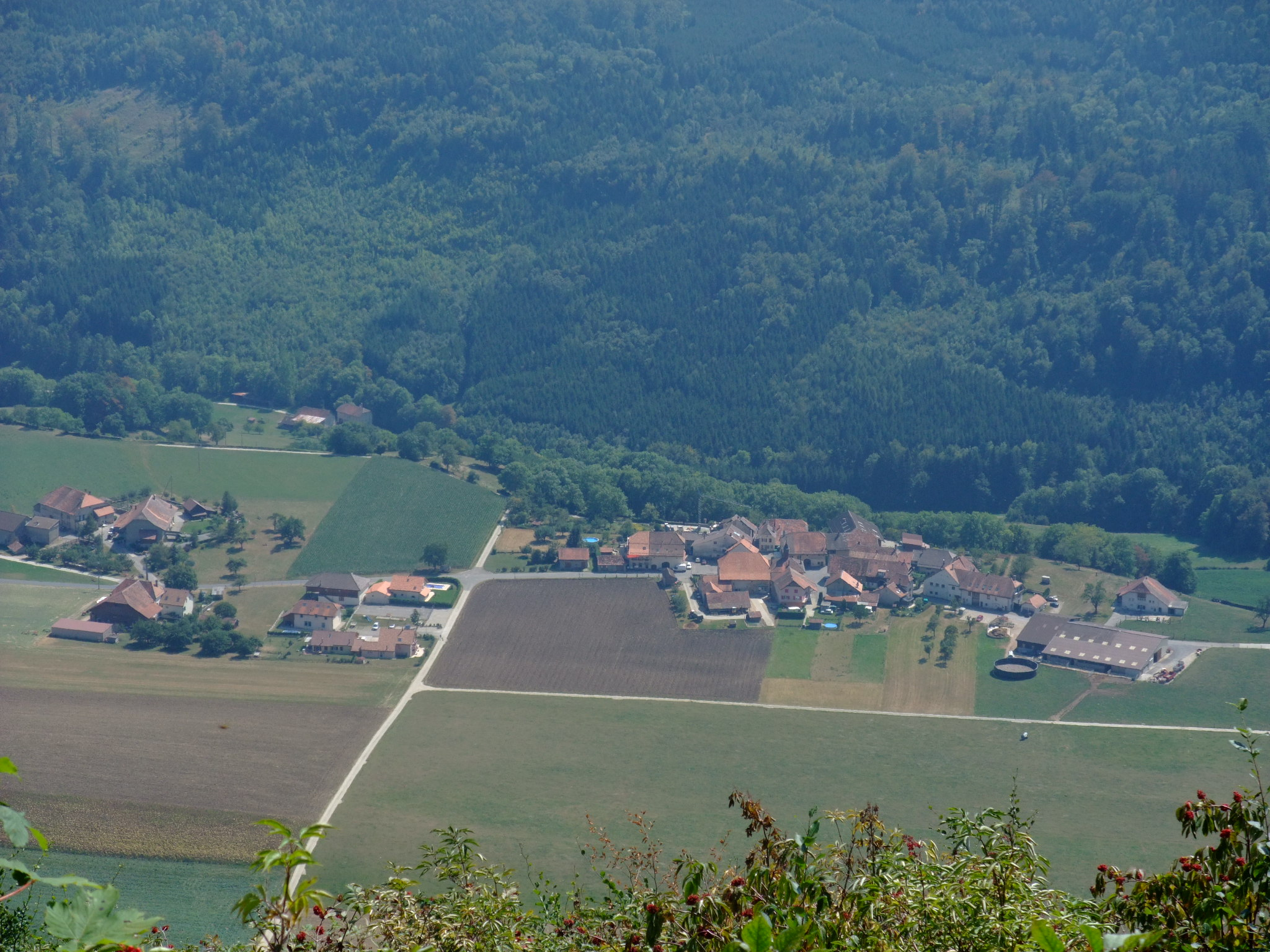

- Flag Coat of arms
- Location of Novalles
- Location within Switzerland Location within Canton of Vaud
- Coordinates: 46°49′N 06°35′E
- Country: Switzerland
- Canton: Vaud
- District: Jura-Nord Vaudois

Government
  - Mayor: Syndic; André Guillet

Area
  - Total: 2.06 km^{2} (0.80 sq mi)
- Elevation: 550 m (1,800 ft)

Population (2004)
  - Total: 101
  - Density: 49.0/km^{2} (127/sq mi)
- Demonym: Lè Tsa
- Time zone: UTC+01:00 (CET)
  - Summer (DST): UTC+02:00 (CEST)
- Postal code: 1431
- SFOS number: 5564
- ISO 3166 code: CH-VD
- Surrounded by: Bullet, Grandevent, Fontaines-sur-Grandson, Giez, Vugelles-La Mothe
- Website: https://www.novalles.ch Profile (in French), SFSO statistics

Novalles is a municipality in the district of Jura-Nord Vaudois in the canton of Vaud in Switzerland.

== History ==
Novalles is first mentioned in 1179 as Novellis.

== Geography ==
Novalles has an area, as of 2009, of 2.06 square kilometers (0.80 sq mi). Of this area, 0.96 km^{2} (0.37 sq mi) or 46.6% is used for agricultural purposes, while 1.01 km^{2} (0.39 sq mi) or 49.0% is forested. Of the rest of the land, 0.09 km^{2} (22 acres) or 4.4% is settled (buildings or roads).

Of the built up area, housing and buildings made up 1.9% and transportation infrastructure made up 1.9%. Out of the forested land, all of the forested land area is covered with heavy forests. Of the agricultural land, 32.5% is used for growing crops and 12.1% is pastures, while 1.9% is used for orchards or vine crops.

The municipality was part of the Grandson District until it was dissolved on 31 August 2006, and Novalles became part of the new district of Jura-Nord Vaudois.

The municipality is located north-west of Grandson on a plateau and along the left bank of the Arnon river. It consists of the haufendorf village (an irregular, unplanned and quite closely packed village, built around a central square) of Novalles and the hamlet of Le Moulin.

== Coat of arms ==
The blazon of the municipal coat of arms is Pally of Six Argent and Azure, overall a Mining-wheel Or.

== Demographics ==
Novalles has a population (as of December 2020) of 100. As of 2008, 3.1% of the population are resident foreign nationals. Over the last 10 years (1999–2009 ) the population has changed at a rate of -8%. It has changed at a rate of -4% due to migration and at a rate of -4% due to births and deaths.

Most of the population (as of 2000) speaks French (92 or 92.9%), with German being second most common (5 or 5.1%) and Italian being third (2 or 2.0%).

Of the population in the municipality 19 or about 19.2% were born in Novalles and lived there in 2000. There were 39 or 39.4% who were born in the same canton, while 35 or 35.4% were born somewhere else in Switzerland, and 6 or 6.1% were born outside of Switzerland.

In 2008 there was 1 live birth to Swiss citizens. Ignoring immigration and emigration, the population of Swiss citizens increased by 1 while the foreign population remained the same. There were 2 Swiss men who immigrated back to Switzerland. The total Swiss population remained the same in 2008 and the non-Swiss population increased by 2 people. This represents a population growth rate of 2.1%.

The age distribution, as of 2009, in Novalles is; 6 children or 6.5% of the population are between 0 and 9 years old and 12 teenagers or 13.0% are between 10 and 19. Of the adult population, 12 people or 13.0% of the population are between 20 and 29 years old. 14 people or 15.2% are between 30 and 39, 14 people or 15.2% are between 40 and 49, and 14 people or 15.2% are between 50 and 59. The senior population distribution is 14 people or 15.2% of the population are between 60 and 69 years old, 5 people or 5.4% are between 70 and 79, there is 1 person who is 80 and 89.

As of 2000, there were 42 people who were single and never married in the municipality. There were 45 married individuals, 7 widows or widowers and 5 individuals who are divorced.

As of 2000, there were 33 private households in the municipality, and an average of 3. persons per household. There were 5 households that consist of only one person and 4 households with five or more people. Out of a total of 33 households that answered this question, 15.2% were households made up of just one person and there were 2 adults who lived with their parents. Of the rest of the households, there are 8 married couples without children, 16 married couples with children There was one single parent with a child or children. There was 1 household that was made up of unrelated people.

In 2000 there were 20 single family homes (or 69.0% of the total) out of a total of 29 inhabited buildings. There were 3 multi-family buildings (10.3%), along with 5 multi-purpose buildings that were mostly used for housing (17.2%) and 1 other use buildings (commercial or industrial) that also had some housing (3.4%). Of the single family homes 17 were built before 1919, while 1 was built between 1990 and 2000. The most multi-family homes (2) were built before 1919 and the next most (1) were built between 1981 and 1990.

In 2000 there were 35 apartments in the municipality. The most common apartment size was 4 rooms of which there were 12. There were 2 single room apartments and 15 apartments with five or more rooms. Of these apartments, a total of 33 apartments (94.3% of the total) were permanently occupied and 2 apartments (5.7%) were empty. As of 2009, the construction rate of new housing units was 0 new units per 1000 residents. The vacancy rate for the municipality, in 2010, was 0%.

The historical population is given in the following chart:

== Sights ==
The entire hamlet of Novalles is designated as part of the Inventory of Swiss Heritage Sites.

== Politics ==
In the 2007 federal election the most popular party was the SVP which received 43% of the vote. The next three most popular parties were the FDP (26.97%), the SP (10.93%) and the Green Party (9.91%). In the federal election, a total of 39 votes were cast, and the voter turnout was 48.8%.

== Economy ==
As of 2010, Novalles had an unemployment rate of 0.1%. As of 2008, there were 12 people employed in the primary economic sector and about 4 businesses involved in this sector. 2 people were employed in the secondary sector and there were 2 businesses in this sector. 2 people were employed in the tertiary sector, with 1 business in this sector. There were 56 residents of the municipality who were employed in some capacity, of which females made up 42.9% of the workforce.

In 2008 the total number of full-time equivalent jobs was 11. The number of jobs in the primary sector was 8, all of which were in agriculture. The number of jobs in the secondary sector was 2 of which 1 was in manufacturing and 1 was in construction. The number of jobs in the tertiary sector was 1.

In 2000, there were 42 workers who commuted away from the municipality. Of the working population, 10.7% used public transportation to get to work, and 60.7% used a private car.

== Religion ==
From the 2000 census, 19 or 19.2% were Roman Catholic, while 56 or 56.6% belonged to the Swiss Reformed Church. Of the rest of the population, there were 18 individuals (or about 18.18% of the population) who belonged to another Christian church. 14 (or about 14.14% of the population) belonged to no church, are agnostic or atheist, and 1 individuals (or about 1.01% of the population) did not answer the question.

== Education ==
In Novalles about 42 or (42.4%) of the population have completed non-mandatory upper secondary education, and 11 or (11.1%) have completed additional higher education (either university or a Fachhochschule). Of the 11 who completed tertiary schooling, 81.8% were Swiss men, 9.1% were Swiss women.

In the 2009/2010 school year there were a total of 8 students in the Novalles school district. In the Vaud cantonal school system, two years of non-obligatory pre-school are provided by the political districts. During the school year, the political district provided pre-school care for a total of 578 children of which 359 children (62.1%) received subsidized pre-school care. The canton's primary school program requires students to attend for four years. There were 3 students in the municipal primary school program. The obligatory lower secondary school program lasts for six years and there were 5 students in those schools.

As of 2000, there were 19 students from Novalles who attended schools outside the municipality.
