= Giez =

- Municipality
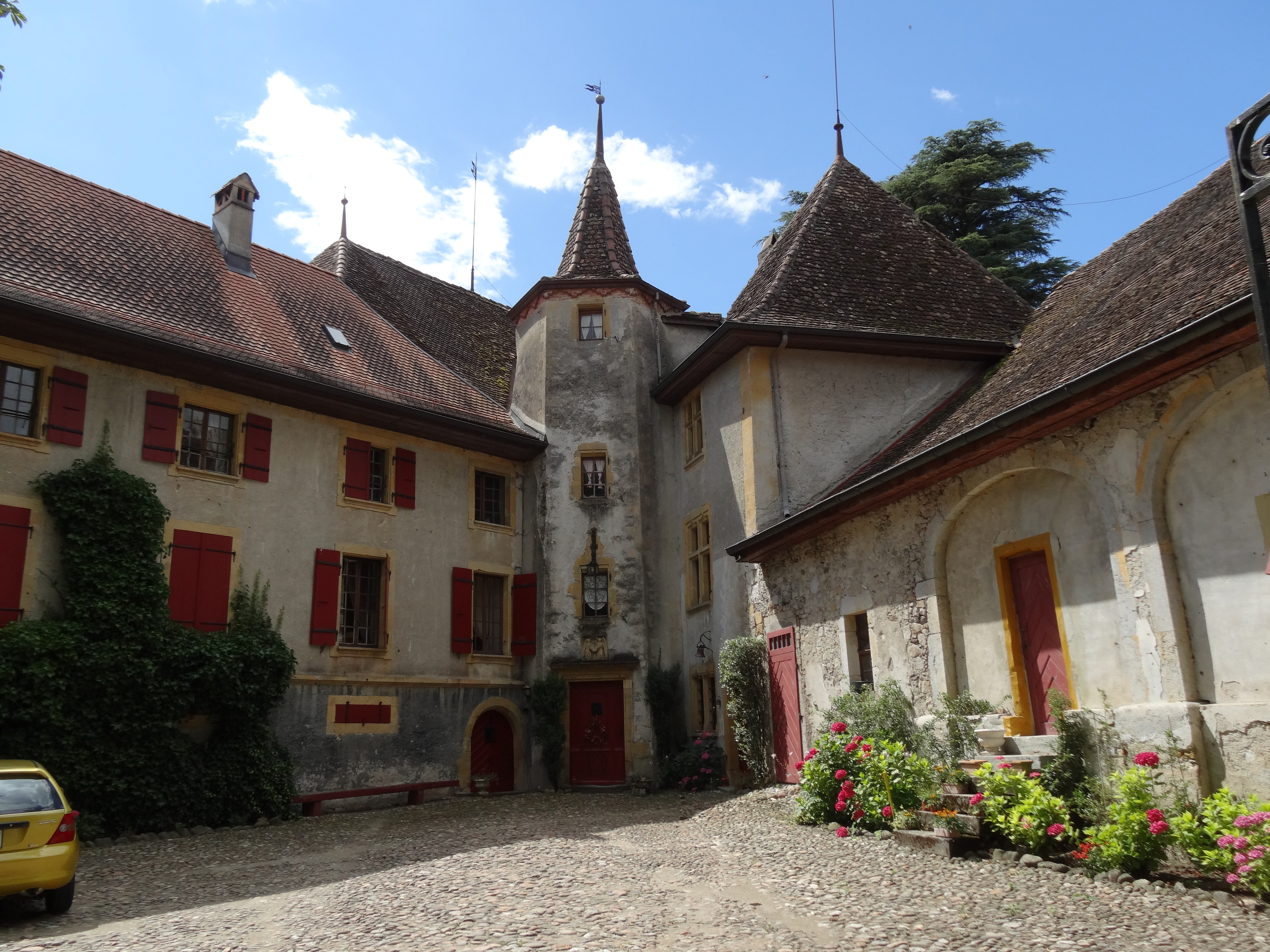

- Flag Coat of arms
- Location of Giez
- Location within Switzerland Location within Canton of Vaud
- Coordinates: 46°49′N 06°37′E
- Country: Switzerland
- Canton: Vaud
- District: Jura-Nord Vaudois

Government
  - Mayor: Syndic

Area
  - Total: 4.77 km^{2} (1.84 sq mi)
- Elevation: 529 m (1,736 ft)

Population (2003)
  - Total: 361
  - Density: 75.7/km^{2} (196/sq mi)
- Time zone: UTC+01:00 (CET)
  - Summer (DST): UTC+02:00 (CEST)
- Postal code: 1429
- SFOS number: 5559
- ISO 3166 code: CH-VD
- Surrounded by: Fiez, Fontaines-sur-Grandson, Grandson, Novalles, Orges, Valeyres-sous-Montagny, Vugelles-La Mothe
- Website: giez.ch

Giez is a municipality in the district of Jura-Nord Vaudois in the canton of Vaud in Switzerland.

== History ==
Giez is first mentioned in 1011 as Gies.

== Geography ==
Giez has an area, as of 2009, of 4.77 square kilometers (1.84 sq mi). Of this area, 2.79 km^{2} (1.08 sq mi) or 58.5% is used for agricultural purposes, while 1.68 km^{2} (0.65 sq mi) or 35.2% is forested. Of the rest of the land, 0.27 km^{2} (0.10 sq mi) or 5.7% is settled (buildings or roads), 0.02 km^{2} (4.9 acres) or 0.4% is either rivers or lakes.

Of the built up area, housing and buildings made up 4.2% and transportation infrastructure made up 1.3%. Out of the forested land, all of the forested land area is covered with heavy forests. Of the agricultural land, 50.3% is used for growing crops and 6.7% is pastures, while 1.5% is used for orchards or vine crops. All the water in the municipality is flowing water.

The municipality was part of the Grandson District until it was dissolved on 31 August 2006, and Giez became part of the new district of Jura-Nord Vaudois.

The municipality is located on a high plateau between Lake Neuchatel and the Jura Mountains.

== Coat of arms ==
The blazon of the municipal coat of arms is Azure, a Key Or.

== Demographics ==
Giez has a population (as of December 2020) of 413. As of 2008, 9.9% of the population are resident foreign nationals. Over the last 10 years (1999–2009 ) the population has changed at a rate of 1.4%. It has changed at a rate of -1.1% due to migration and at a rate of 2.5% due to births and deaths.

Most of the population (as of 2000) speaks French (331 or 95.1%), with German being second most common (12 or 3.4%) and Arabic being third (2 or 0.6%). There is 1 person who speaks Italian.

Of the population in the municipality 87 or about 25.0% were born in Giez and lived there in 2000. There were 156 or 44.8% who were born in the same canton, while 60 or 17.2% were born somewhere else in Switzerland, and 31 or 8.9% were born outside of Switzerland.

In 2008 there were 2 live births to Swiss citizens and were 3 deaths of Swiss citizens. Ignoring immigration and emigration, the population of Swiss citizens decreased by 1 while the foreign population remained the same. At the same time, there was 1 non-Swiss man and 1 non-Swiss woman who immigrated from another country to Switzerland. The total Swiss population change in 2008 (from all sources, including moves across municipal borders) was an increase of 2 and the non-Swiss population increased by 2 people. This represents a population growth rate of 1.1%.

The age distribution, as of 2009, in Giez is; 42 children or 11.6% of the population are between 0 and 9 years old and 50 teenagers or 13.9% are between 10 and 19. Of the adult population, 23 people or 6.4% of the population are between 20 and 29 years old. 36 people or 10.0% are between 30 and 39, 66 people or 18.3% are between 40 and 49, and 55 people or 15.2% are between 50 and 59. The senior population distribution is 37 people or 10.2% of the population are between 60 and 69 years old, 29 people or 8.0% are between 70 and 79, there are 18 people or 5.0% who are between 80 and 89, and there are 5 people or 1.4% who are 90 and older.

As of 2000, there were 133 people who were single and never married in the municipality. There were 179 married individuals, 16 widows or widowers and 20 individuals who are divorced.

As of 2000, there were 137 private households in the municipality, and an average of 2.5 persons per household. There were 33 households that consist of only one person and 13 households with five or more people. Out of a total of 140 households that answered this question, 23.6% were households made up of just one person and there was 1 adult who lived with their parents. Of the rest of the households, there are 41 married couples without children, 50 married couples with children There were 11 single parents with a child or children. There was 1 household that was made up of unrelated people and 3 households that were made up of some sort of institution or another collective housing.

In 2000 there were 81 single-family homes (or 67.5% of the total) out of a total of 120 inhabited buildings. There were 13 multi-family buildings (10.8%), along with 20 multi-purpose buildings that were mostly used for housing (16.7%) and 6 other use buildings (commercial or industrial) that also had some housing (5.0%). Of the single-family homes 12 were built before 1919, while 13 were built between 1990 and 2000. The greatest number of single-family homes (29) were built between 1971 and 1980. The most multi-family homes (4) were built before 1919 and the next most (3) were built between 1919 and 1945.

In 2000 there were 153 apartments in the municipality. The most common apartment size was 5 rooms of which there were 38. There were 6 single-room apartments and 72 apartments with five or more rooms. Of these apartments, a total of 133 apartments (86.9% of the total) were permanently occupied, while 15 apartments (9.8%) were seasonally occupied and 5 apartments (3.3%) were empty. As of 2009, the construction rate of new housing units was 0 new units per 1000 residents. The vacancy rate for the municipality, in 2010, was 0%.

The historical population is given in the following chart:

== Sights ==
The entire region of Giez is designated as part of the Inventory of Swiss Heritage Sites.

== Politics ==
In the 2007 federal election the most popular party was the SVP which received 31.02% of the vote. The next three most popular parties were the Green Party (18.63%), the FDP (14.72%) and the SP (13.46%). In the federal election, a total of 120 votes were cast, and the voter turnout was 46.7%.

== Economy ==
As of 2010, Giez had an unemployment rate of 3.3%. As of 2008, there were 30 people employed in the primary economic sector and about 10 businesses involved in this sector. 35 people were employed in the secondary sector and there were 3 businesses in this sector. 22 people were employed in the tertiary sector, with 9 businesses in this sector. There were 186 residents of the municipality who were employed in some capacity, of which females made up 43.5% of the workforce.

In 2008 the total number of full-time equivalent jobs was 69. The number of jobs in the primary sector was 18, all of which were in agriculture. The number of jobs in the secondary sector was 35 of which 33 or (94.3%) were in manufacturing and 2 (5.7%) were in construction. The number of jobs in the tertiary sector was 16. In the tertiary sector; 7 or 43.8% were in wholesale or retail sales or the repair of motor vehicles, 3 or 18.8% were in the movement and storage of goods, 2 or 12.5% were in the information industry, 1 was in education.

In 2000, there were 58 workers who commuted into the municipality and 144 workers who commuted away. The municipality is a net exporter of workers, with about 2.5 workers leaving the municipality for every one entering. About 12.1% of the workforce coming into Giez are coming from outside Switzerland. Of the working population, 11.3% used public transportation to get to work, and 61.3% used a private car.

== Religion ==
From the 2000 census, 65 or 18.7% were Roman Catholic, while 235 or 67.5% belonged to the Swiss Reformed Church. Of the rest of the population, there was 1 member of an Orthodox church, and there were 6 individuals (or about 1.72% of the population) who belonged to another Christian church. There were 4 (or about 1.15% of the population) who were Islamic. 17 (or about 4.89% of the population) belonged to no church, are agnostic or atheist, and 23 individuals (or about 6.61% of the population) did not answer the question.

== Education ==
In Giez about 138 or (39.7%) of the population have completed non-mandatory upper secondary education, and 52 or (14.9%) have completed additional higher education (either university or a Fachhochschule). Of the 52 who completed tertiary schooling, 63.5% were Swiss men, 30.8% were Swiss women.

In the 2009/2010 school year there were a total of 44 students in the Giez school district. In the Vaud cantonal school system, two years of non-obligatory pre-school are provided by the political districts. During the school year, the political district provided pre-school care for a total of 578 children of which 359 children (62.1%) received subsidized pre-school care. The canton's primary school program requires students to attend for four years. There were 22 students in the municipal primary school program. The obligatory lower secondary school program lasts for six years and there were 22 students in those schools.

As of 2000, there were 43 students in Giez who came from another municipality, while 47 residents attended schools outside the municipality.
