= Vugelles-La Mothe =

- Municipality
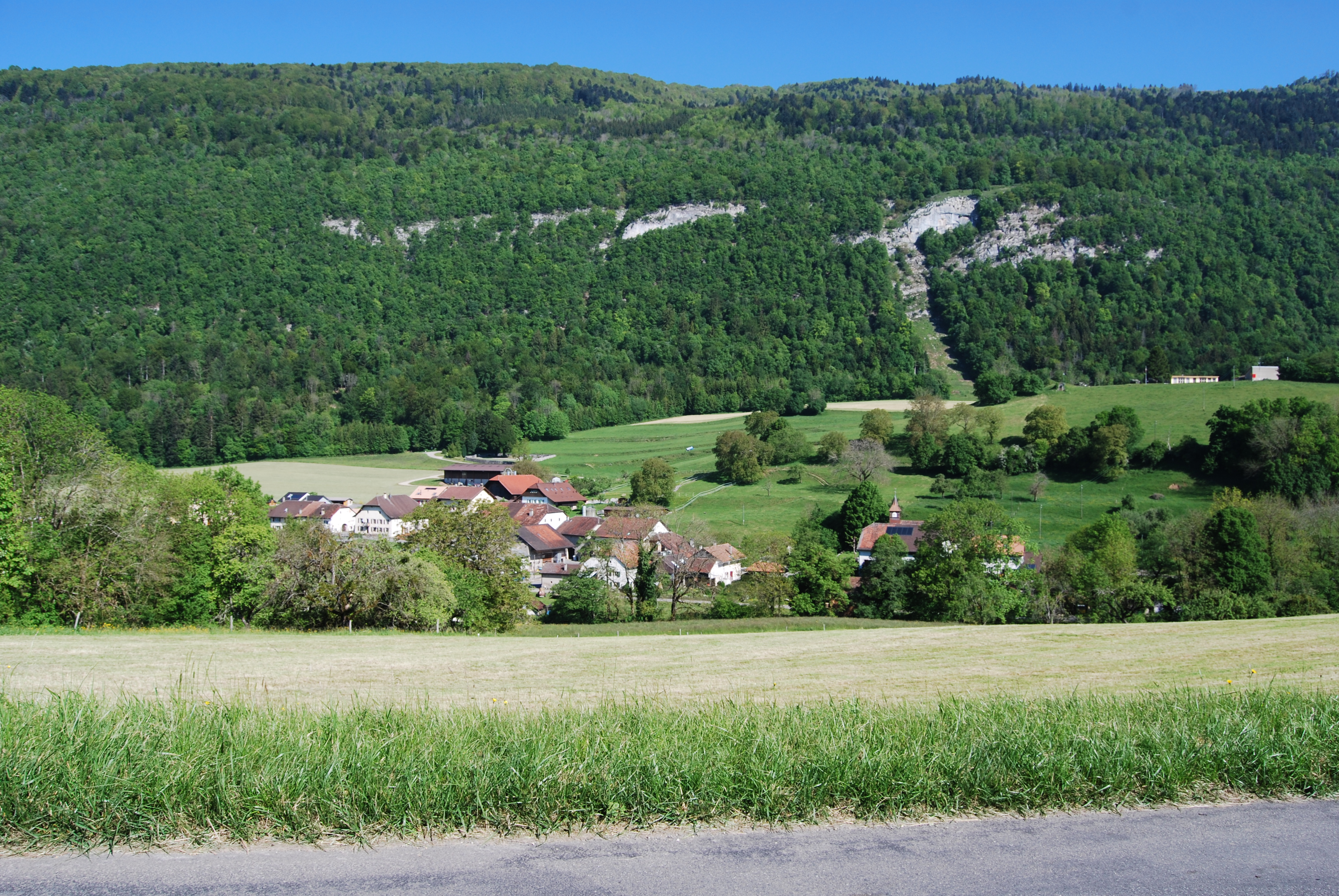

- Flag Coat of arms
- Location of Vugelles-La Mothe
- Location within Switzerland Location within Canton of Vaud
- Coordinates: 46°49′N 6°35′E
- Country: Switzerland
- Canton: Vaud
- District: Jura-Nord Vaudois

Government
  - Mayor: Syndic

Area
  - Total: 3.08 km^{2} (1.19 sq mi)
- Elevation: 520 m (1,710 ft)

Population (2003)
  - Total: 106
  - Density: 34.4/km^{2} (89.1/sq mi)
- Time zone: UTC+01:00 (CET)
  - Summer (DST): UTC+02:00 (CEST)
- Postal code: 1431
- SFOS number: 5937
- ISO 3166 code: CH-VD
- Surrounded by: Bullet, Giez, Novalles, Orges, Vuiteboeuf
- Website: https://vugelleslamothe.ch Profile (in French), SFSO statistics

Vugelles-La Mothe is a municipality in the district of Jura-Nord Vaudois of the canton of Vaud in Switzerland.

== Geography ==
Vugelles-La Mothe has an area, as of 2009, of 3.1 square kilometers (1.2 mi^{2}). Of this area, 0.95 km^{2} (0.37 mi^{2}) or 30.9% is used for agricultural purposes, while 1.97 km^{2} (0.76 mi^{2}) or 64.2% is forested. Of the rest of the land, 0.13 km^{2} (32 acres) or 4.2% is settled (buildings or roads), 0.01 km^{2} (2.5 acres) or 0.3% is either rivers or lakes and 0.04 km^{2} (9.9 acres) or 1.3% is unproductive land.

Of the built up area, housing and buildings made up 1.3% and transportation infrastructure made up 2.3%. Out of the forested land, 60.6% of the total land area is heavily forested and 3.6% is covered with orchards or small clusters of trees. Of the agricultural land, 14.0% is used for growing crops and 14.3% is pastures, while 1.3% is used for orchards or vine crops and 1.3% is used for alpine pastures. All the water in the municipality is flowing water.

The municipality was part of the Yverdon District until it was dissolved on 31 August 2006, and Vugelles-La Mothe became part of the new district of Jura-Nord Vaudois.

== Coat of arms ==
The blazon of the municipal coat of arms is Pally of Six Argent and Azure, overall an Owl proper standing on a semi Mining-weel Or.

== Demographics ==
Vugelles-La Mothe has a population (as of December 2020) of 138. As of 2008, 5.9% of the population are resident foreign nationals. Over the last 10 years (1999–2009 ) the population has changed at a rate of 5.5%. It has changed at a rate of 3.6% due to migration and at a rate of 0% due to births and deaths.

Most of the population (as of 2000) speaks French (81 or 81.8%) as their first language, German is the second most common (14 or 14.1%) and English is the third (2 or 2.0%).

The age distribution, as of 2009, in Vugelles-La Mothe is; 19 children or 16.4% of the population are between 0 and 9 years old and 15 teenagers or 12.9% are between 10 and 19. Of the adult population, 13 people or 11.2% of the population are between 20 and 29 years old. 17 people or 14.7% are between 30 and 39, 17 people or 14.7% are between 40 and 49, and 15 people or 12.9% are between 50 and 59. The senior population distribution is 11 people or 9.5% of the population are between 60 and 69 years old, 5 people or 4.3% are between 70 and 79, there are 4 people or 3.4% who are between 80 and 89.

As of 2000, there were 37 people who were single and never married in the municipality. There were 48 married individuals, 8 widows or widowers and 6 individuals who are divorced.

As of 2000, there were 38 private households in the municipality, and an average of 2.6 persons per household. There were 7 households that consist of only one person and 4 households with five or more people. Out of a total of 38 households that answered this question, 18.4% were households made up of just one person. Of the rest of the households, there are 11 married couples without children, 15 married couples with children There were 5 single parents with a child or children.

In 2000 there were 17 single family homes (or 53.1% of the total) out of a total of 32 inhabited buildings. There were 2 multi-family buildings (6.3%), along with 7 multi-purpose buildings that were mostly used for housing (21.9%) and 6 other use buildings (commercial or industrial) that also had some housing (18.8%).

In 2000, a total of 36 apartments (92.3% of the total) were permanently occupied and 3 apartments (7.7%) were empty. As of 2009, the construction rate of new housing units was 0 new units per 1000 residents. The vacancy rate for the municipality, in 2010, was 0%.

The historical population is given in the following chart:

== Politics ==
In the 2007 federal election the most popular party was the SVP which received 52.54% of the vote. The next three most popular parties were the SP (18.21%), the FDP (11.38%) and the Green Party (9.63%). In the federal election, a total of 33 votes were cast, and the voter turnout was 44.6%.

== Economy ==
As of 2010, Vugelles-La Mothe had an unemployment rate of 6.6%. As of 2008, there were 10 people employed in the primary economic sector and about 3 businesses involved in this sector. 5 people were employed in the secondary sector and there were 2 businesses in this sector. 4 people were employed in the tertiary sector, with 1 business in this sector. There were 43 residents of the municipality who were employed in some capacity, of which females made up 46.5% of the workforce.

In 2008 the total number of full-time equivalent jobs was 15. The number of jobs in the primary sector was 7, all of which were in agriculture. The number of jobs in the secondary sector was 4 of which 3 or (75.0%) were in manufacturing The number of jobs in the tertiary sector was 4, all in a hotel or restaurant.

In 2000, there were 7 workers who commuted into the municipality and 25 workers who commuted away. The municipality is a net exporter of workers, with about 3.6 workers leaving the municipality for every one entering. Of the working population, 7% used public transportation to get to work, and 51.2% used a private car.

== Religion ==
From the 2000 census, 10 or 10.1% were Roman Catholic, while 70 or 70.7% belonged to the Swiss Reformed Church. There were 2 individuals who were Hindu. 15 (or about 15.15% of the population) belonged to no church, are agnostic or atheist, and 2 individuals (or about 2.02% of the population) did not answer the question.

== Education ==
In Vugelles-La Mothe about 29 or (29.3%) of the population have completed non-mandatory upper secondary education, and 16 or (16.2%) have completed additional higher education (either university or a Fachhochschule). Of the 16 who completed tertiary schooling, 56.3% were Swiss men, 37.5% were Swiss women.

In the 2009/2010 school year there were a total of 20 students in the Vugelles-La Mothe school district. In the Vaud cantonal school system, two years of non-obligatory pre-school are provided by the political districts. During the school year, the political district provided pre-school care for a total of 578 children of which 359 children (62.1%) received subsidized pre-school care. The canton's primary school program requires students to attend for four years. There were 9 students in the municipal primary school program. The obligatory lower secondary school program lasts for six years and there were 9 students in those schools. There were also 2 students who were home schooled or attended another non-traditional school.

As of 2000, there were 22 students from Vugelles-La Mothe who attended schools outside the municipality.
