= Sainte-Croix, Switzerland =

Sainte-Croix
- Municipality
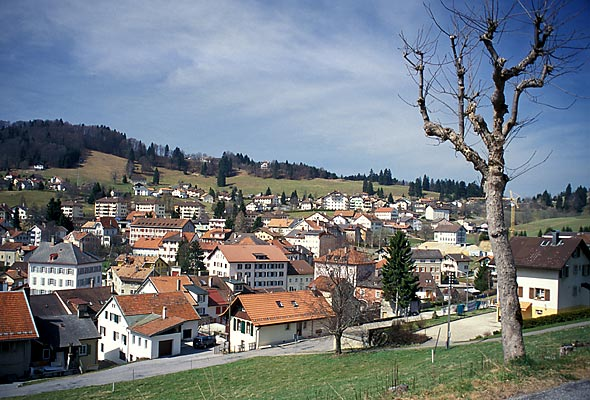
- View of the city from the south

- Flag Coat of arms
- Location of Sainte-Croix
- Location within Switzerland Location within Canton of Vaud
- Coordinates: 46°49′N 06°30′E
- Country: Switzerland
- Canton: Vaud
- District: Jura-Nord Vaudois

Government
  - Mayor: Syndic

Area
  - Total: 39.42 km^{2} (15.22 sq mi)
- Elevation: 1,086 m (3,563 ft)

Population (2003)
  - Total: 4,187
  - Density: 106.2/km^{2} (275.1/sq mi)
- Time zone: UTC+01:00 (CET)
  - Summer (DST): UTC+02:00 (CEST)
- Postal code: 1450
- SFOS number: 5568
- ISO 3166 code: CH-VD
- Surrounded by: Baulmes, Bullet, Buttes (NE), Fiez, La Côte-aux-Fées (NE), Les Fourgs (FR-25), Les Hôpitaux-Vieux (FR-25), Vuiteboeuf
- Website: www.sainte-croix.ch

Sainte-Croix (French pronunciation: [sɛ̃t kʁwa]) is a municipality in the district of Jura-Nord Vaudois in the canton of Vaud in Switzerland.

== History ==
Sainte-Croix is first mentioned in 1177 as Sancta Crux. In 1317 it was mentioned as Saint Crueyz. Previously it was known by its German name Heilig Kreuz.

== Geography ==
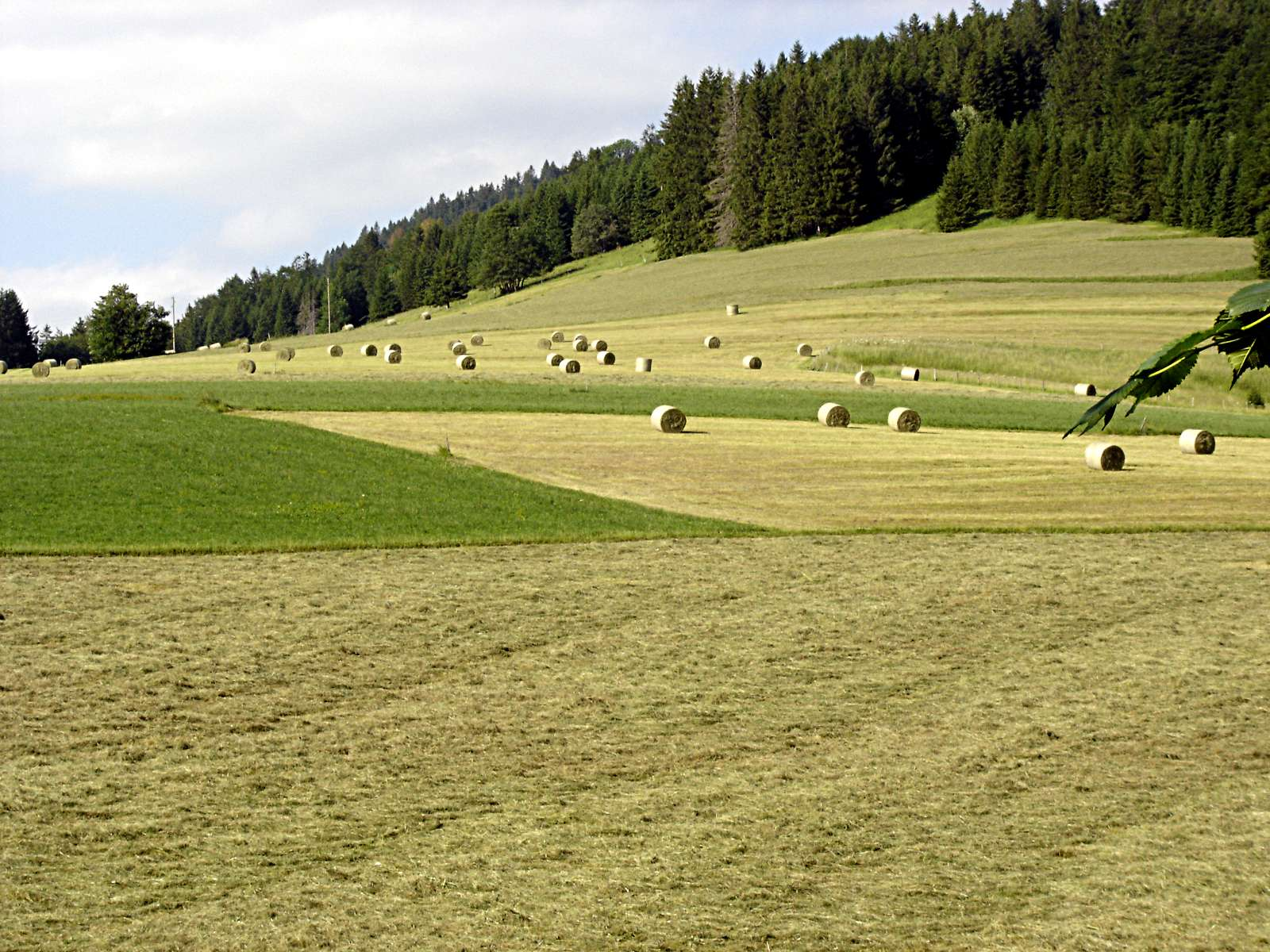
Fields outside Sainte Croix

Aerial view (1970)

Sainte-Croix has an area, as of 2009, of 39.42 square kilometers (15.22 sq mi). Of this area, 16.21 km^{2} (6.26 sq mi) or 41.1% is used for agricultural purposes, while 19.57 km^{2} (7.56 sq mi) or 49.6% is forested. Of the rest of the land, 2.74 km^{2} (1.06 sq mi) or 7.0% is settled (buildings or roads), 0.1 km^{2} (25 acres) or 0.3% is either rivers or lakes and 0.69 km^{2} (0.27 sq mi) or 1.8% is unproductive land.

Of the built up area, housing and buildings made up 3.6% and transportation infrastructure made up 2.6%. Out of the forested land, 45.9% of the total land area is heavily forested and 3.8% is covered with orchards or small clusters of trees. Of the agricultural land, 1.0% is used for growing crops and 21.2% is pastures and 18.9% is used for alpine pastures. All the water in the municipality is flowing water.

The municipality was part of the Grandson District until it was dissolved on 31 August 2006, and Sainte-Croix became part of the new district of Jura-Nord Vaudois.

It is located between Yverdon in Vaud, Fleurier in Neuchâtel, and Pontarlier in France.

The village of Sainte Croix is situated at an altitude of 1,086 meters (3,563 ft) in the Jura Mountains at the foot of the Chasseron. The municipal area stretches over two valleys, Sainte Croix and Les Granges and includes 27 villages. Some of the most notable include Sainte Croix, L' Auberson, La Gitte Dessous, La Chaux, La Vraconne, La Sagne and Le Château.

== Coat of arms ==
The blazon of the municipal coat of arms is Azure, a Latin Cross Or issuant from a Coupeaux Vert.

== Demographics ==
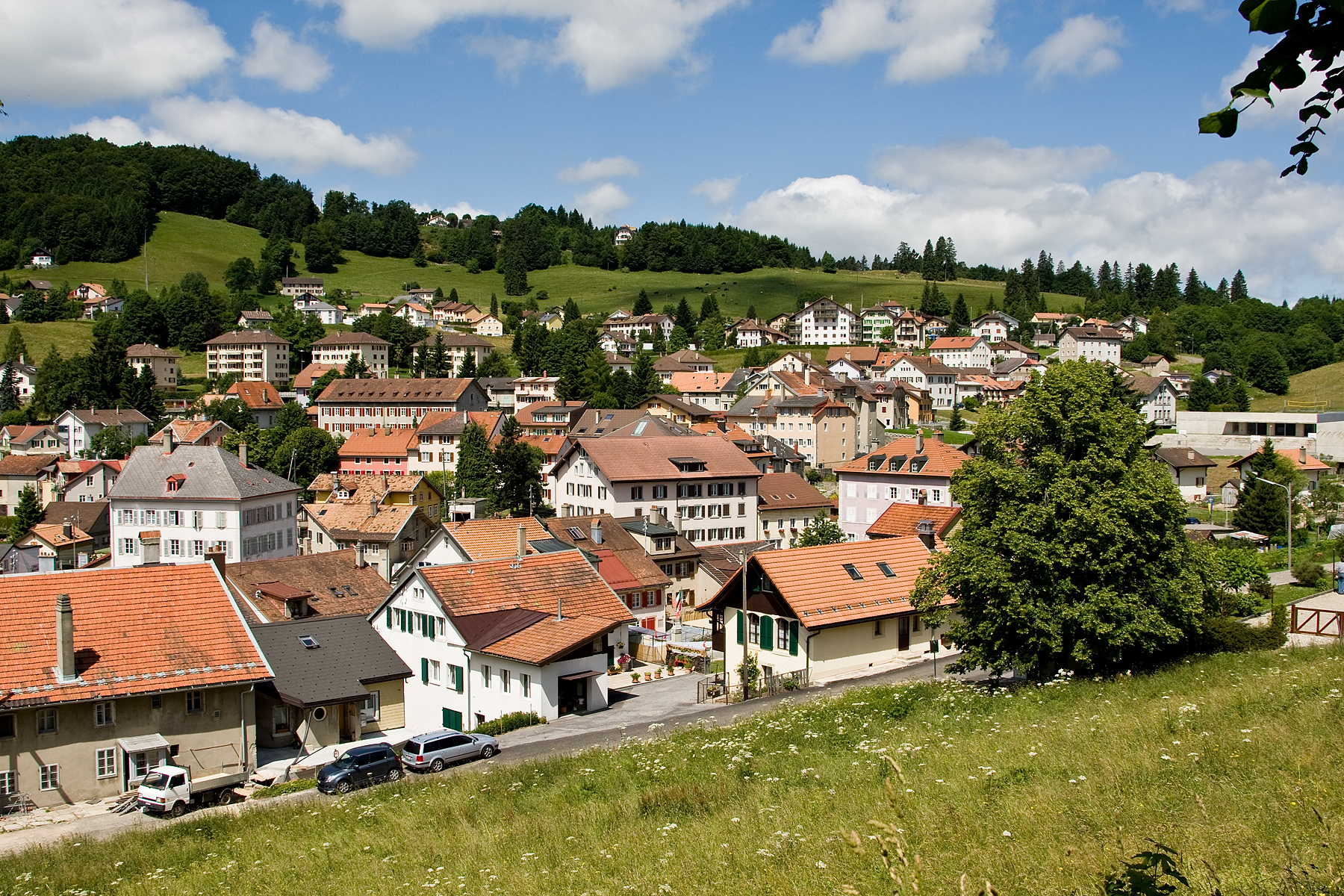
Sainte Croix village

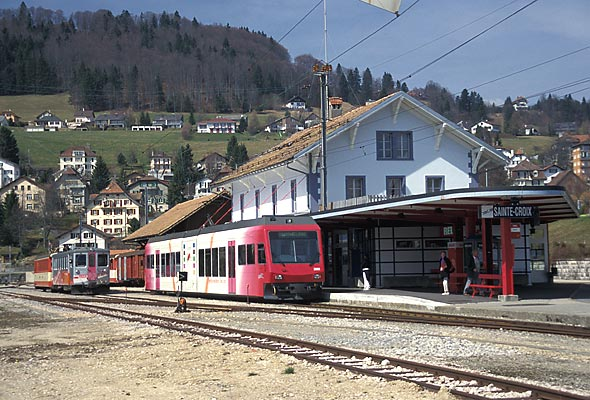
Sainte Croix train station

Sainte-Croix has a population (as of December 2020) of 4,933. As of 2008, 14.6% of the population are resident foreign nationals. Over the last 10 years (1999–2009 ) the population has changed at a rate of 7.5%. It has changed at a rate of 14.3% due to migration and at a rate of -5.8% due to births and deaths.

Most of the population (as of 2000) speaks French (3,914 or 90.3%), with German being second most common (96 or 2.2%) and Italian being third (93 or 2.1%). There are 2 people who speak Romansh.

Of the population in the municipality 1,734 or about 40.0% were born in Sainte-Croix and lived there in 2000. There were 885 or 20.4% who were born in the same canton, while 618 or 14.3% were born somewhere else in Switzerland, and 746 or 17.2% were born outside of Switzerland.

In 2008 there were 43 live births to Swiss citizens and 9 births to non-Swiss citizens, and in same time span there were 49 deaths of Swiss citizens and 2 non-Swiss citizen deaths. Ignoring immigration and emigration, the population of Swiss citizens decreased by 6 while the foreign population increased by 7. There were 7 Swiss men who immigrated back to Switzerland and 2 Swiss women who emigrated from Switzerland. At the same time, there were 25 non-Swiss men and 22 non-Swiss women who immigrated from another country to Switzerland. The total Swiss population change in 2008 (from all sources, including moves across municipal borders) was an increase of 3 and the non-Swiss population increased by 39 people. This represents a population growth rate of 1.0%.

The age distribution, as of 2009, in Sainte-Croix is; 400 children or 9.0% of the population are between 0 and 9 years old and 448 teenagers or 10.0% are between 10 and 19. Of the adult population, 499 people or 11.2% of the population are between 20 and 29 years old. 464 people or 10.4% are between 30 and 39, 623 people or 14.0% are between 40 and 49, and 581 people or 13.0% are between 50 and 59. The senior population distribution is 639 people or 14.3% of the population are between 60 and 69 years old, 417 people or 9.3% are between 70 and 79, there are 322 people or 7.2% who are between 80 and 89, and there are 69 people or 1.5% who are 90 and older.

As of 2000, there were 1,549 people who were single and never married in the municipality. There were 2,086 married individuals, 443 widows or widowers and 255 individuals who are divorced.

As of 2000, there were 1,980 private households in the municipality, and an average of 2. persons per household. There were 836 households that consist of only one person and 105 households with five or more people. Out of a total of 2,053 households that answered this question, 40.7% were households made up of just one person and there were 20 adults who lived with their parents. Of the rest of the households, there are 609 married couples without children, 416 married couples with children There were 87 single parents with a child or children. There were 12 households that were made up of unrelated people and 73 households that were made up of some sort of institution or another collective housing.

In 2000 there were 579 single family homes (or 47.2% of the total) out of a total of 1,226 inhabited buildings. There were 367 multi-family buildings (29.9%), along with 193 multi-purpose buildings that were mostly used for housing (15.7%) and 87 other use buildings (commercial or industrial) that also had some housing (7.1%). Of the single family homes 173 were built before 1919, while 33 were built between 1990 and 2000. The most multi-family homes (183) were built before 1919 and the next most (72) were built between 1946 and 1960. There was 1 multi-family house built between 1996 and 2000.

In 2000 there were 2,847 apartments in the municipality. The most common apartment size was 3 rooms of which there were 1,049. There were 155 single room apartments and 485 apartments with five or more rooms. Of these apartments, a total of 1,926 apartments (67.7% of the total) were permanently occupied, while 643 apartments (22.6%) were seasonally occupied and 278 apartments (9.8%) were empty. As of 2009, the construction rate of new housing units was 0.9 new units per 1000 residents. The vacancy rate for the municipality, in 2010, was 1.26%.

The historical population is given in the following chart:

== Sights ==
The entire villages of L’Auberson and Sainte-Croix and the hamlet of La Chaux are designated as part of the Inventory of Swiss Heritage Sites.

The Centre International de la Mécanique d'Art is located in the municipality.

== Politics ==
In the 2007 federal election the most popular party was the SP which received 35.49% of the vote. The next three most popular parties were the SVP (25.48%), the FDP (11.66%) and the Green Party (10.93%). In the federal election, a total of 1,263 votes were cast, and the voter turnout was 40.8%.

== Economy ==
As of 2010, Sainte-Croix had an unemployment rate of 6.3%. As of 2008, there were 91 people employed in the primary economic sector and about 36 businesses involved in this sector. 674 people were employed in the secondary sector and there were 60 businesses in this sector. 891 people were employed in the tertiary sector, with 145 businesses in this sector. There were 1,704 residents of the municipality who were employed in some capacity, of which females made up 42.3% of the workforce.

In 2008 the total number of full-time equivalent jobs was 1,385. The number of jobs in the primary sector was 63, of which 55 were in agriculture and 8 were in forestry or lumber production. The number of jobs in the secondary sector was 630 of which 543 or (86.2%) were in manufacturing and 88 (14.0%) were in construction. The number of jobs in the tertiary sector was 692. In the tertiary sector; 151 or 21.8% were in wholesale or retail sales or the repair of motor vehicles, 32 or 4.6% were in the movement and storage of goods, 78 or 11.3% were in a hotel or restaurant, 16 or 2.3% were in the information industry, 10 or 1.4% were the insurance or financial industry, 22 or 3.2% were technical professionals or scientists, 102 or 14.7% were in education and 185 or 26.7% were in health care.

In 2000, there were 886 workers who commuted into the municipality and 585 workers who commuted away. The municipality is a net importer of workers, with about 1.5 workers entering the municipality for every one leaving. About 33.9% of the workforce coming into Sainte-Croix are coming from outside Switzerland. Of the working population, 8.3% used public transportation to get to work, and 57% used a private car.

== Transportation ==
The meter gauge electric Yverdon–Ste-Croix railway line links Sainte Croix with Yverdon-les-Bains.

== Religion ==
From the 2000 census, 920 or 21.2% were Roman Catholic, while 2,275 or 52.5% belonged to the Swiss Reformed Church. Of the rest of the population, there were 12 members of an Orthodox church (or about 0.28% of the population), there were 2 individuals (or about 0.05% of the population) who belonged to the Christian Catholic Church, and there were 308 individuals (or about 7.11% of the population) who belonged to another Christian church. There were 2 individuals (or about 0.05% of the population) who were Jewish, and 104 (or about 2.40% of the population) who were Islamic. There were 3 individuals who were Buddhist, 12 individuals who were Hindu and 5 individuals who belonged to another church. 457 (or about 10.55% of the population) belonged to no church, are agnostic or atheist, and 385 individuals (or about 8.89% of the population) did not answer the question.

== Education ==
In Sainte-Croix about 1,433 or (33.1%) of the population have completed non-mandatory upper secondary education, and 348 or (8.0%) have completed additional higher education (either university or a Fachhochschule). Of the 348 who completed tertiary schooling, 61.8% were Swiss men, 22.7% were Swiss women, 10.6% were non-Swiss men and 4.9% were non-Swiss women.

In the 2009/2010 school year there were a total of 464 students in the Sainte-Croix school district. In the Vaud cantonal school system, two years of non-obligatory pre-school are provided by the political districts. During the school year, the political district provided pre-school care for a total of 578 children of which 359 children (62.1%) received subsidized pre-school care. The canton's primary school program requires students to attend for four years. There were 223 students in the municipal primary school program. The obligatory lower secondary school program lasts for six years and there were 223 students in those schools. There were also 18 students who were home schooled or attended another non-traditional school.

As of 2000, there were 160 students in Sainte-Croix who came from another municipality, while 106 residents attended schools outside the municipality.

Sainte-Croix is home to the Musée des Arts et des Sciences and the CIMA. In 2009 the Musée des Arts et des Sciences was visited by 757 visitors (the average in previous years was 530). In 2009 the CIMA was visited by 14,171 visitors (the average in previous years was 18,096).

== Sport ==
In the winter, it is a popular winter sports resort.
