= Boccard (noble family) =

Swiss patrician family

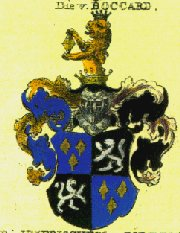
The de Boccard family coat of arms from the 1734 edition of Siebmacher's Book of Coats of Arms.

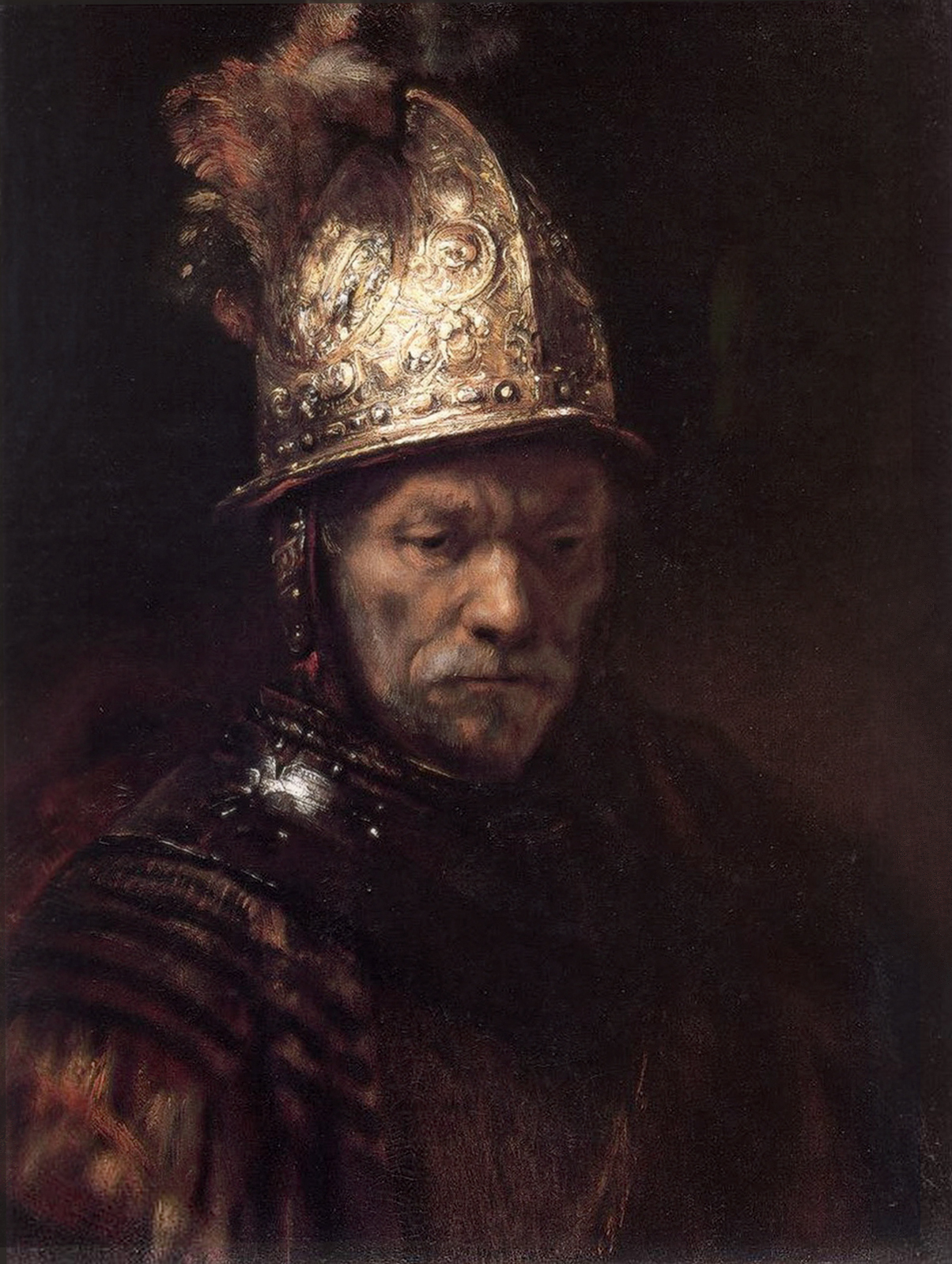
The Man with the Golden Helmet

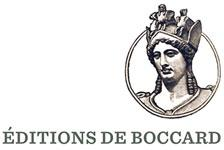
Logo of the former Parisian publishing house Éditions de Boccard

The de Boccard family (German: Burckhardt) is a Catholic patrician family from the Swiss Canton of Fribourg.

== History ==
The first known representative of the de Boccard family was Pierre Boccardier of Onnens (Canton of Vaud), who was mentioned in 1462 as a co-owner of Corcelles-près-Concise. In 1538, a Boccard was granted citizenship in Fribourg for the first time.

After settling in Freiburg, the Boccards distinguished themselves in various political offices within the city-state. From the early 17th century, members of the family also served in the Spanish military in the Duchy of Milan. From 1751 to 1782, François-Jean-Philippe de Boccard commanded a regiment in the French army. Nearly twenty members of the family served in the Papal Swiss Guard, during the Restoration in Naples and Rome, in the Fribourg militia, and in the Swiss Army.

In the 19th and 20th centuries the family held roles including members of the Fribourg Grand Council, Stadtammann (Mayor), Oberamtmann (district administrator), judges, police commanders, and bankers. However, the family also included a publisher in Paris, two female painters, and three explorers who traveled to Africa, South America, and Australia.

== Notable members ==
- Antoinette de Weck-de Boccard (1868–1956): A painter from Fribourg and sister of Louis de Boccard.
- Elisa de Boccard (1847–1925): A painter from Fribourg and sister of Raymond de Boccard (see below). Along with him, she sold the inherited portrait The Man with the Golden Helmet—which was at the time attributed to the Dutch painter Rembrandt van Rijn—to the London art gallery P. & D. Colnaghi & Co., which subsequently resold it in 1897 to the Kaiser Friedrich Museumsverein (Berlin).
- Enrico de Boccard (1921–1988): An Italian journalist, writer, and secret agent.
- Eugène de Boccard (1879–1957): A poet and publisher from Fribourg; in 1911, he acquired the Parisian publishing house "Albert Fontemoing" and renamed it "Éditions de Boccard."
- François Jean-Philippe de Boccard (1696–1782): A Swiss soldier in the French army.
- Hubert de Boccard (1835–1908): A soldier, gold miner, and explorer who bequeathed the majority of his arms collection to the Museum of Estavayer-le-Lac (also known as the "Frog Museum").
- Jeanne-Marie de Boccard (1922–2020): A lawyer, diplomat, and women's rights activist; wife of Pierre de Boccard (1921–1995) (see below).
- Joseph Hubert de Boccard (1697–1758): Bishop of Lausanne.
- Louis de Boccard (1866–1956): Emigrated to Argentina in 1889, where he became a South American adventurer, explorer, taxidermist, and farmer; brother of Antoinette de Weck-de Boccard.
- Pierre de Boccard (1921–1995): A private banker in Geneva.
- Pierre de Boccard (born 1988): A member of the Geneva Municipal Council (FDP) and elected as its president in 2023.
- Raymond de Boccard (1844–1923): A member of the Fribourg Grand Council, soldier, police director, fire chief, and curator of the Fribourg Musée d'art et d'histoire.
- Theodor Scherer-Boccard (1816–1885): A Swiss journalist and politician.
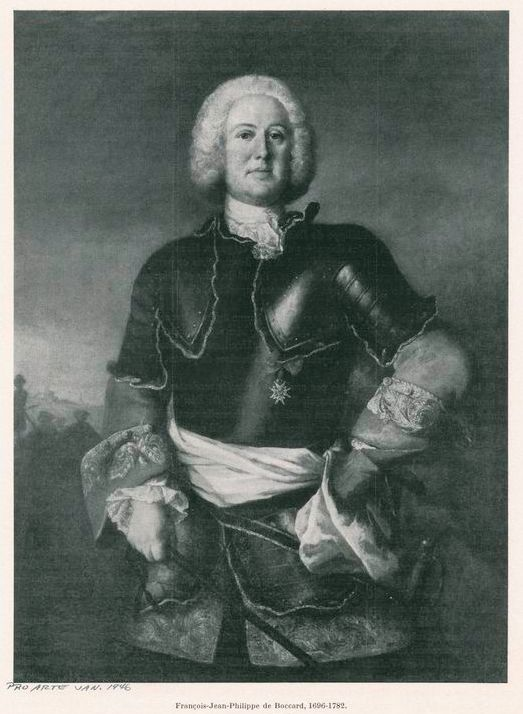
François Jean Philippe de Boccard

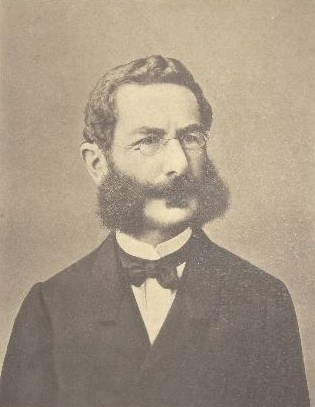
Theodor Scherer-Boccard

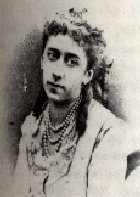
Elisa de Boccard

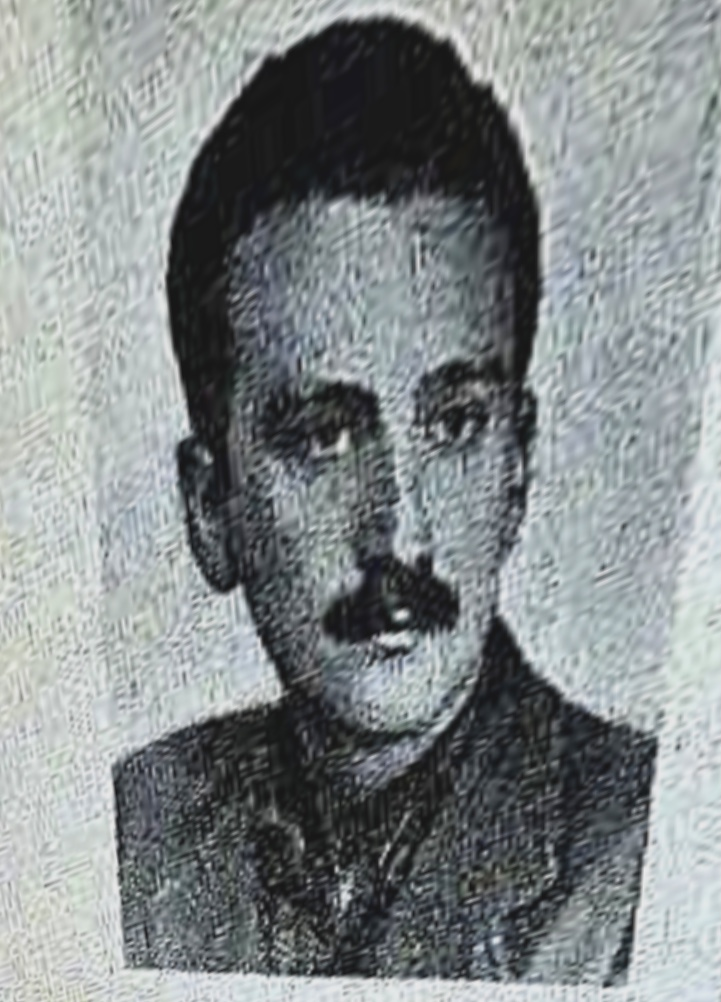
Enrico de Boccard

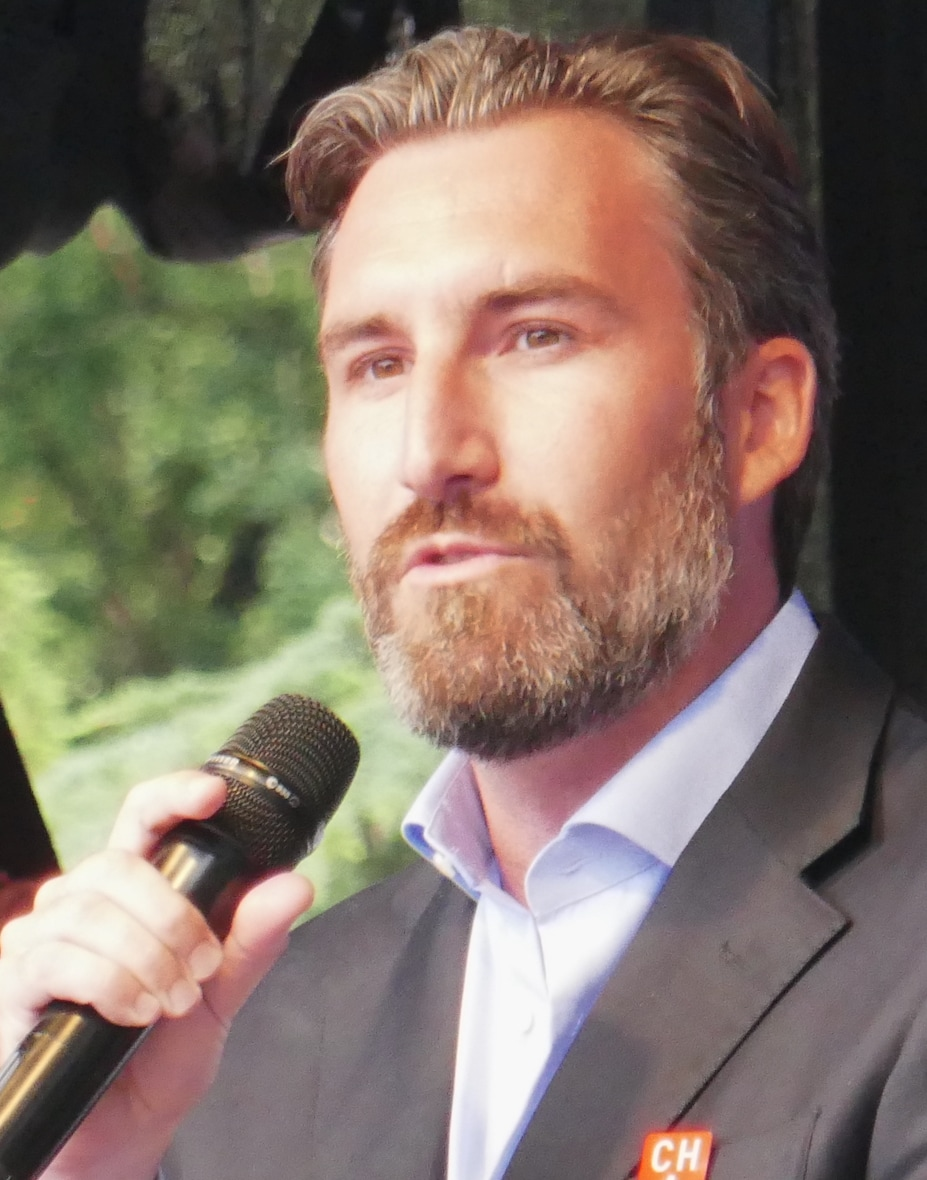
Pierre de Boccard, Geneva politician

== Castles and manors ==
The following estates belonged to (or are still owned by) various branches of the de Boccard family:

- de Boccard Castle, Givisiez, Canton of Fribourg
- Maison de Sorens, Vuippens, Canton of Fribourg
- Givisiez Castle, Givisiez, Canton of Fribourg
- Griset de Forel Castle, Middes (Municipality of Torny), Canton of Fribourg
- Jetschwil Castle, Jetschwil, Canton of Fribourg
- Baillival Castle, Vuippens, Canton of Fribourg
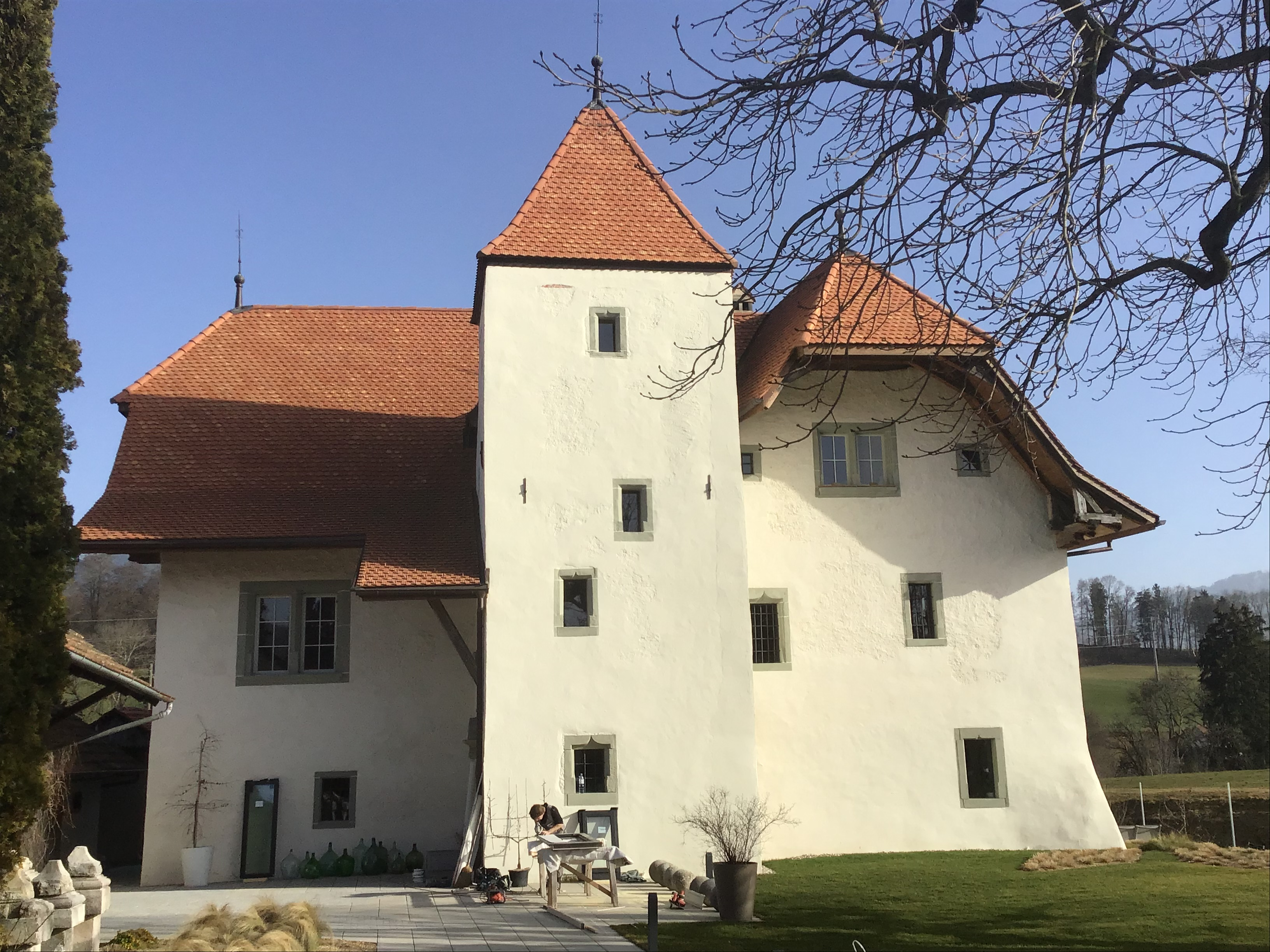
Maison de Sorens

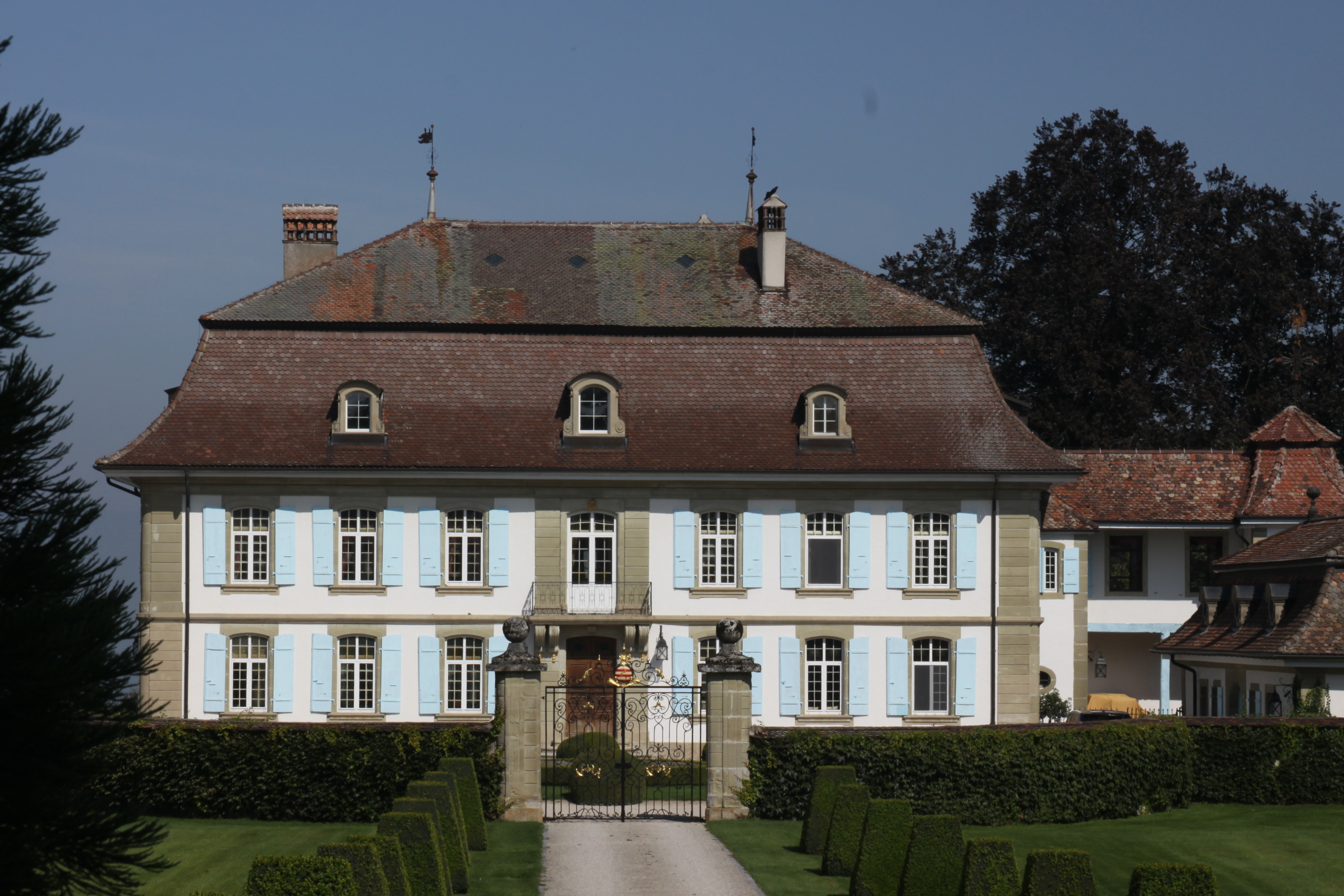
Griset de Forel Castle

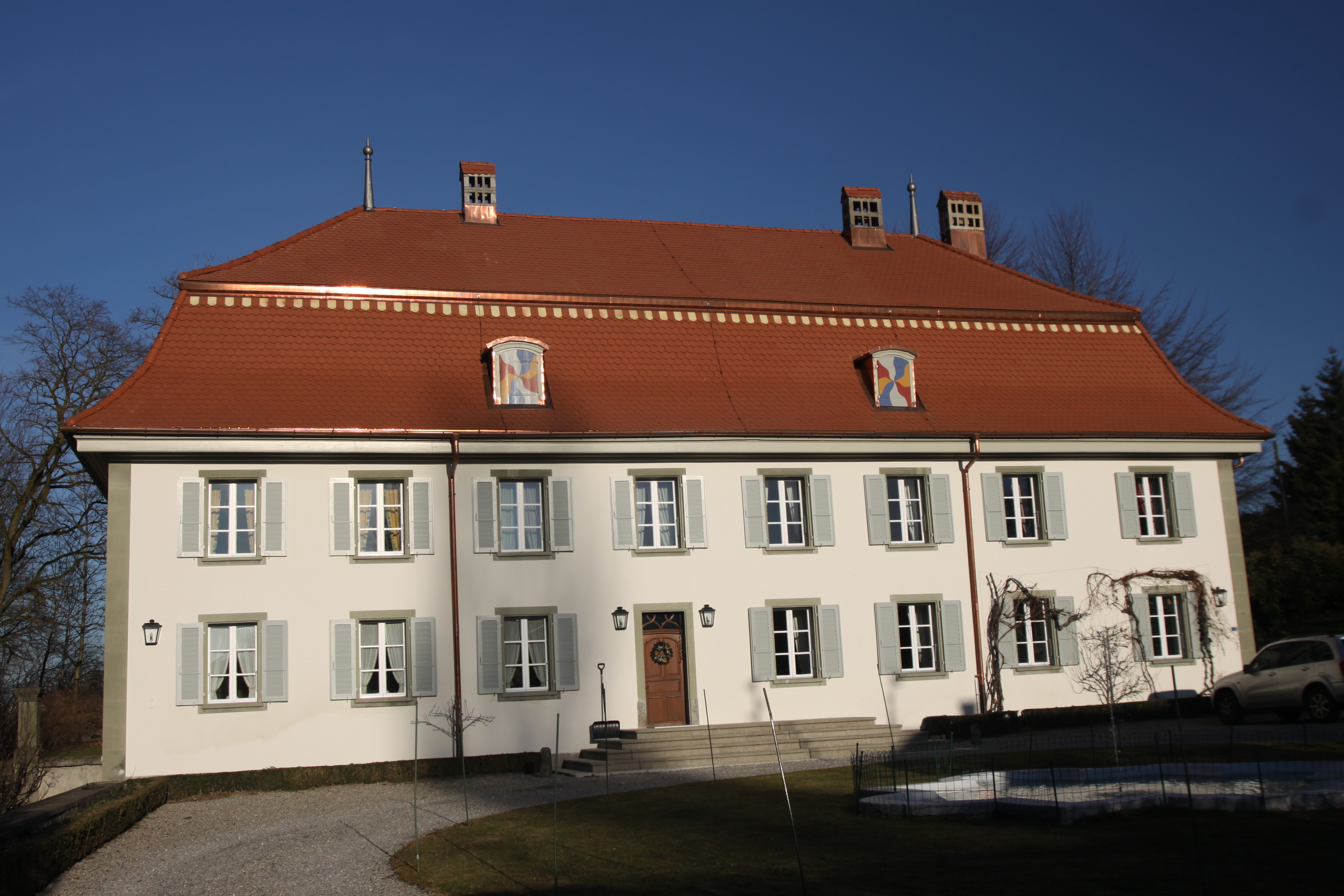
Jetschwil Castle

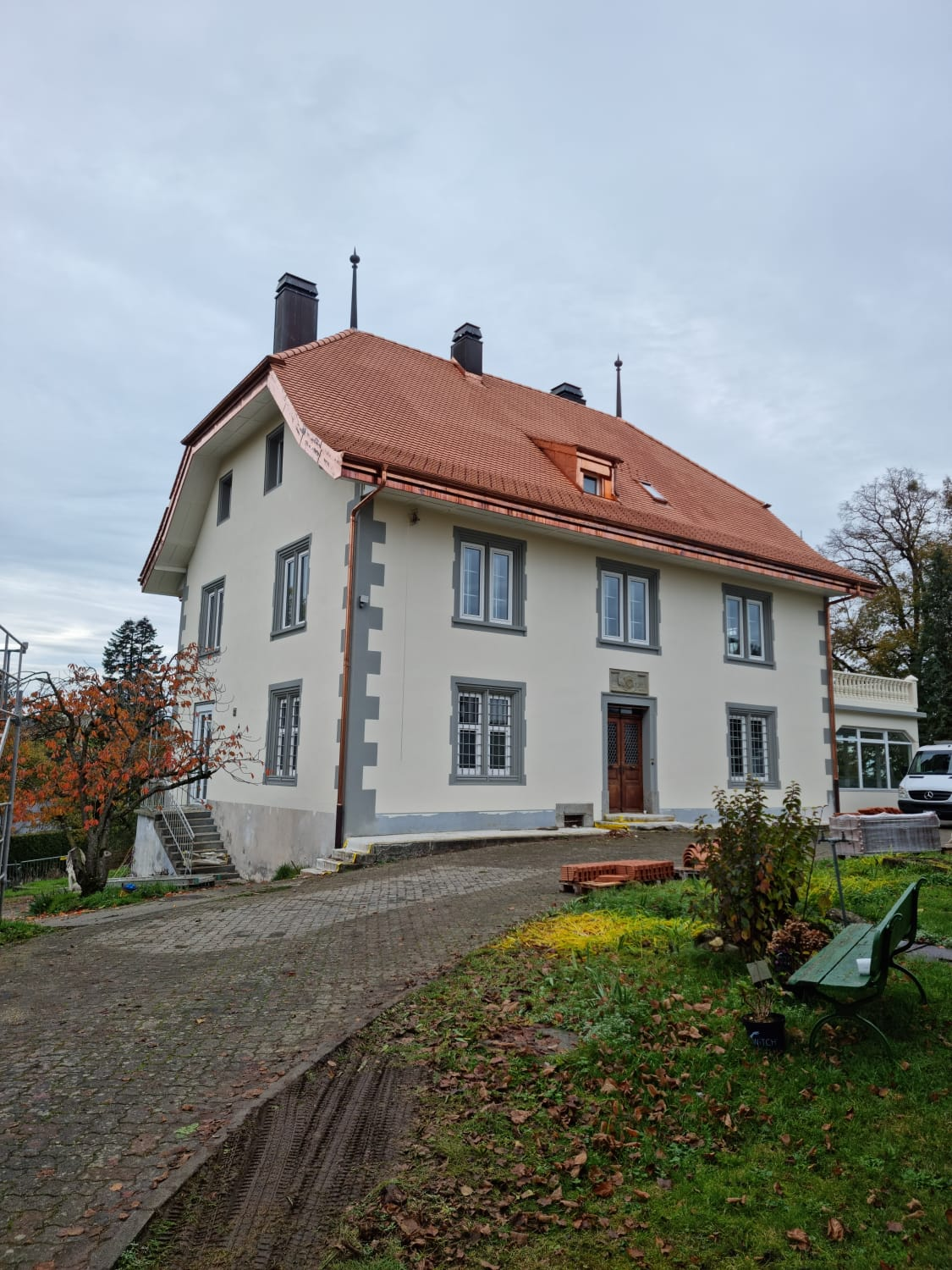
de Boccard Castle

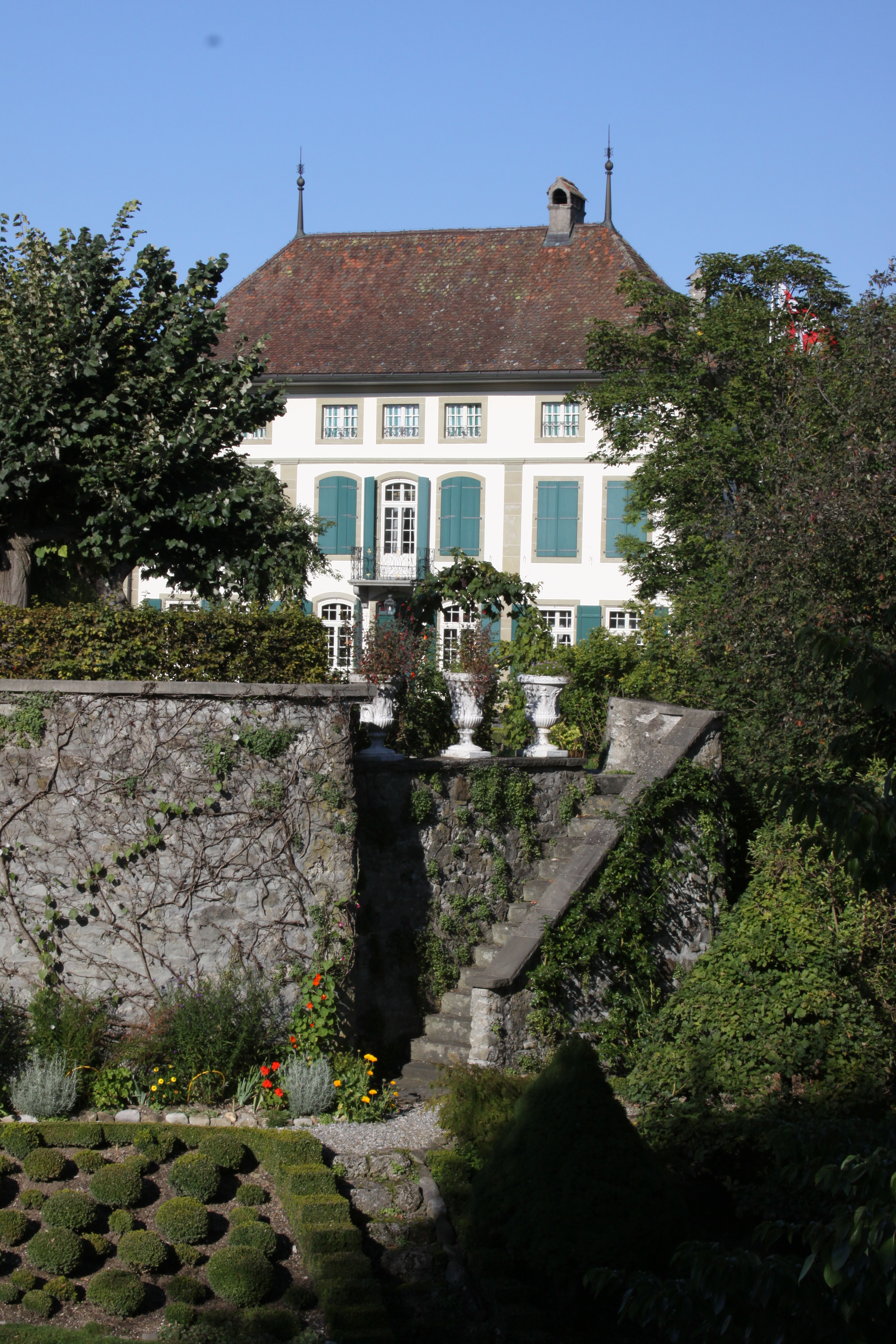
Baillival Castle (Vuippens)
