= Mutrux (disambiguation) =

Mutrux is a municipality in the district of Jura-Nord Vaudois in the canton of Vaud in Switzerland.

Mutrux may also refer to:

- Floyd Mutrux (born 1941), American stage and film director, writer, producer, and screenwriter
- Gail Mutrux (born 1945), American film producer
