= Concise, Switzerland =

Concise
- Municipality
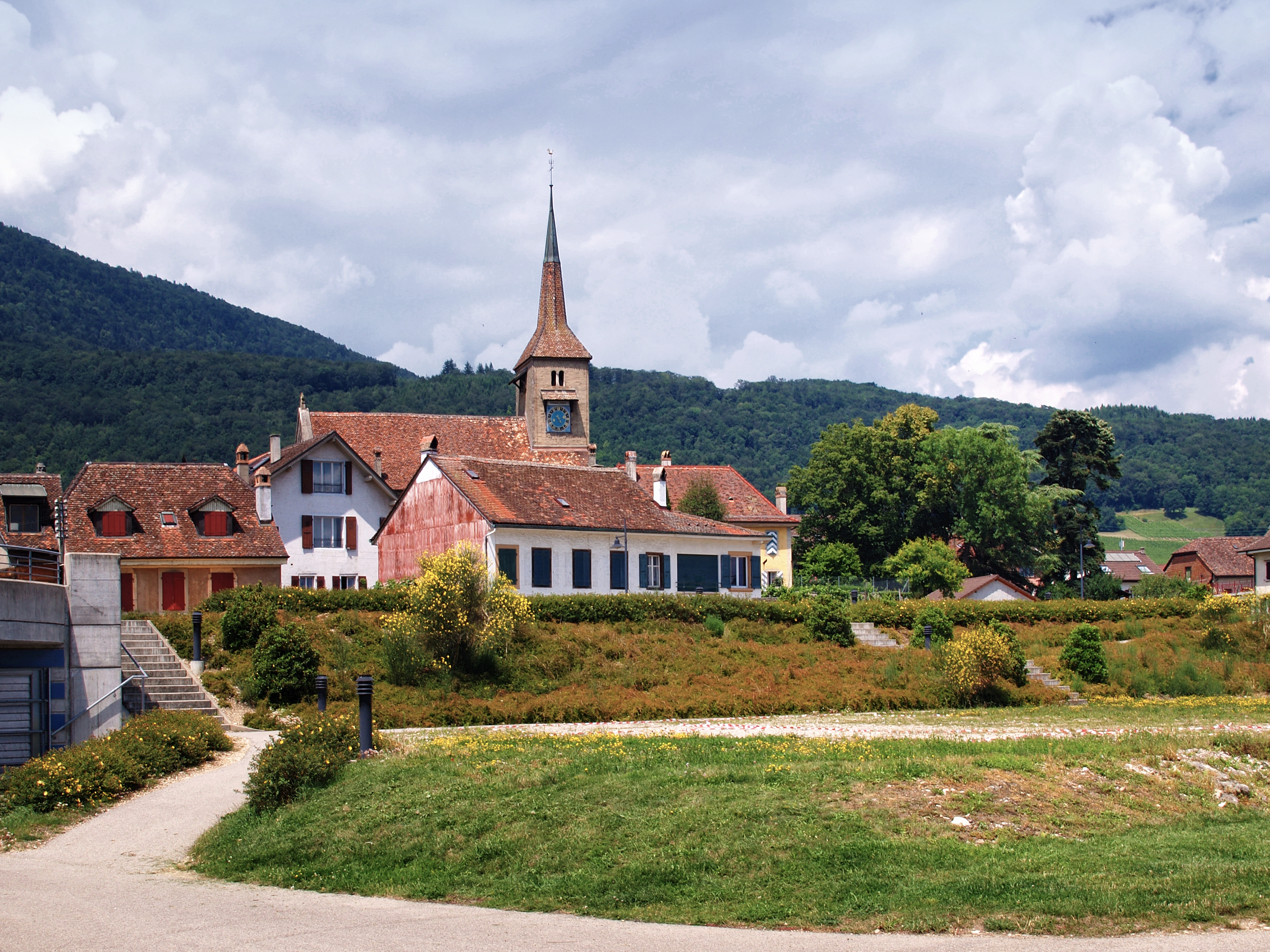
- Concise village and church of Saint-Jean Baptiste

- Flag Coat of arms
- Location of Concise
- Location within Switzerland Location within Canton of Vaud
- Coordinates: 46°51′N 06°43′E
- Country: Switzerland
- Canton: Vaud
- District: Jura-Nord Vaudois

Government
  - Mayor: Syndic; Michel Paris

Area
  - Total: 11.41 km^{2} (4.41 sq mi)
- Elevation: 438 m (1,437 ft)

Population (2004)
  - Total: 714
  - Density: 62.6/km^{2} (162/sq mi)
- Demonym(s): Les Concisois; Les Rebibes
- Time zone: UTC+01:00 (CET)
  - Summer (DST): UTC+02:00 (CEST)
- Postal code: 1426
- SFOS number: 5554
- ISO 3166 code: CH-VD
- Localities: La Raisse
- Surrounded by: Mutrux, Vaumarcus (NE), Corcelles-près-Concise, Bonvillars, Provence
- Website: concise.ch

Concise is a municipality in the district of Jura-Nord Vaudois in the canton of Vaud in Switzerland.

== History ==
Concise is first mentioned in 1179 as Concisa.

== Geography ==
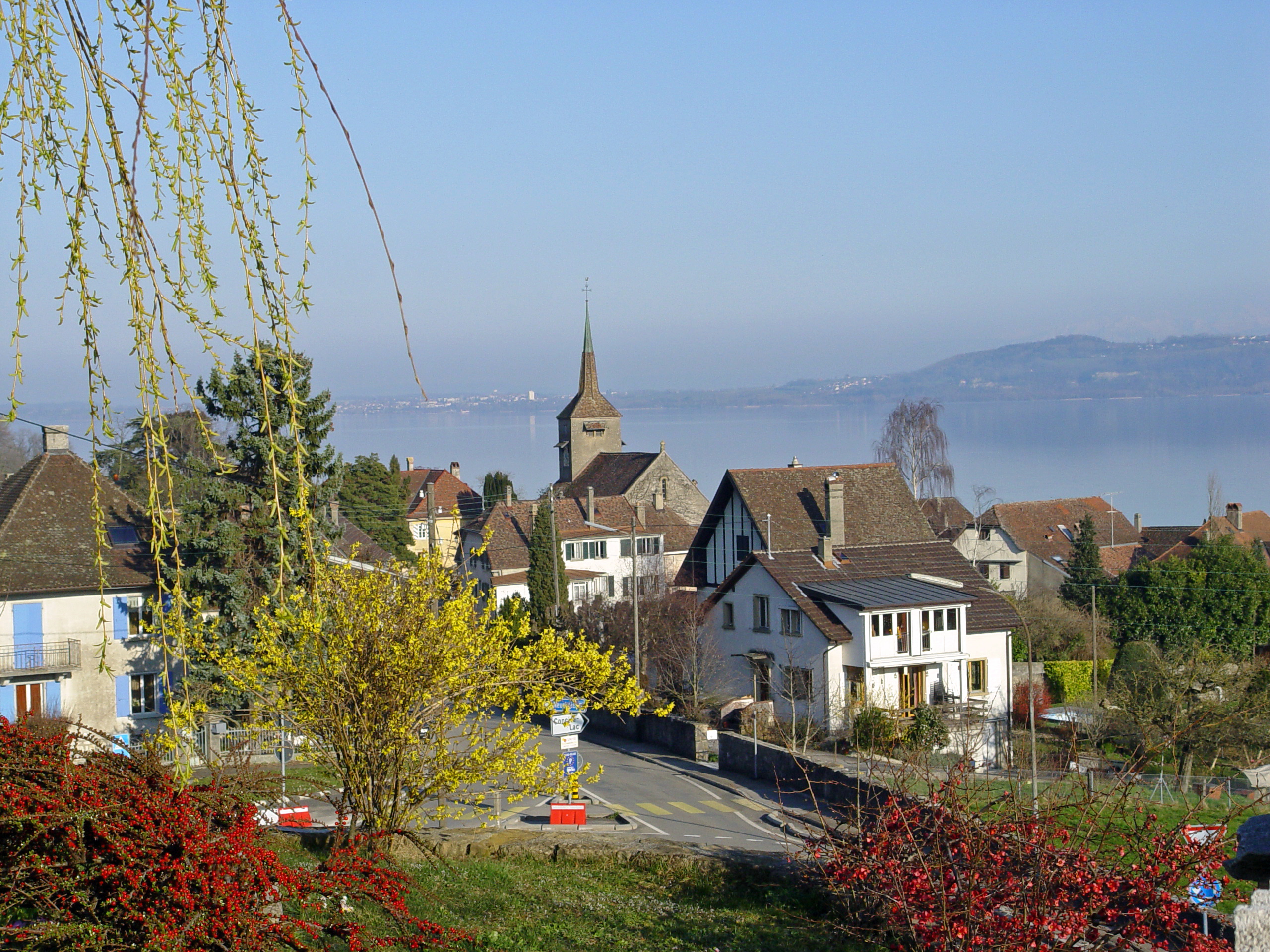
Concise village and Lake Neuchatel

Aerial view (1954)

Concise has an area, as of 2009, of 11.4 square kilometers (4.4 sq mi). Of this area, 2.78 km^{2} (1.07 sq mi) or 24.4% is used for agricultural purposes, while 7.56 km^{2} (2.92 sq mi) or 66.3% is forested. Of the rest of the land, 1 km^{2} (0.39 sq mi) or 8.8% is settled (buildings or roads), 0.01 km^{2} (2.5 acres) or 0.1% is either rivers or lakes and 0.02 km^{2} (4.9 acres) or 0.2% is unproductive land.

Of the built up area, housing and buildings made up 2.8% and transportation infrastructure made up 4.0%. Power and water infrastructure as well as other special developed areas made up 1.6% of the area Out of the forested land, 64.6% of the total land area is heavily forested and 1.7% is covered with orchards or small clusters of trees. Of the agricultural land, 9.0% is used for growing crops and 6.3% is pastures, while 4.5% is used for orchards or vine crops and 4.6% is used for alpine pastures. All the water in the municipality is in lakes.

The municipality was part of the Grandson District until it was dissolved on 31 August 2006, and Concise became part of the new district of Jura-Nord Vaudois.

The municipality is located along the border with the Canton of Neuchatel. It stretches from the shores of Lake Neuchatel to Mont Aubert. It consists of the village of Concise, the hamlets of La Lance and La Raisse and multiple alpine settlements in the Jura Mountains.

The municipalities of Concise, Corcelles-près-Concise, Mutrux and Onnens are considering a merger on 1 January 2014 into a new municipality with an, as of 2011, undetermined name.

== Coat of arms ==
The blazon of the municipal coat of arms is Azure, a Buck salient Or.

== Demographics ==
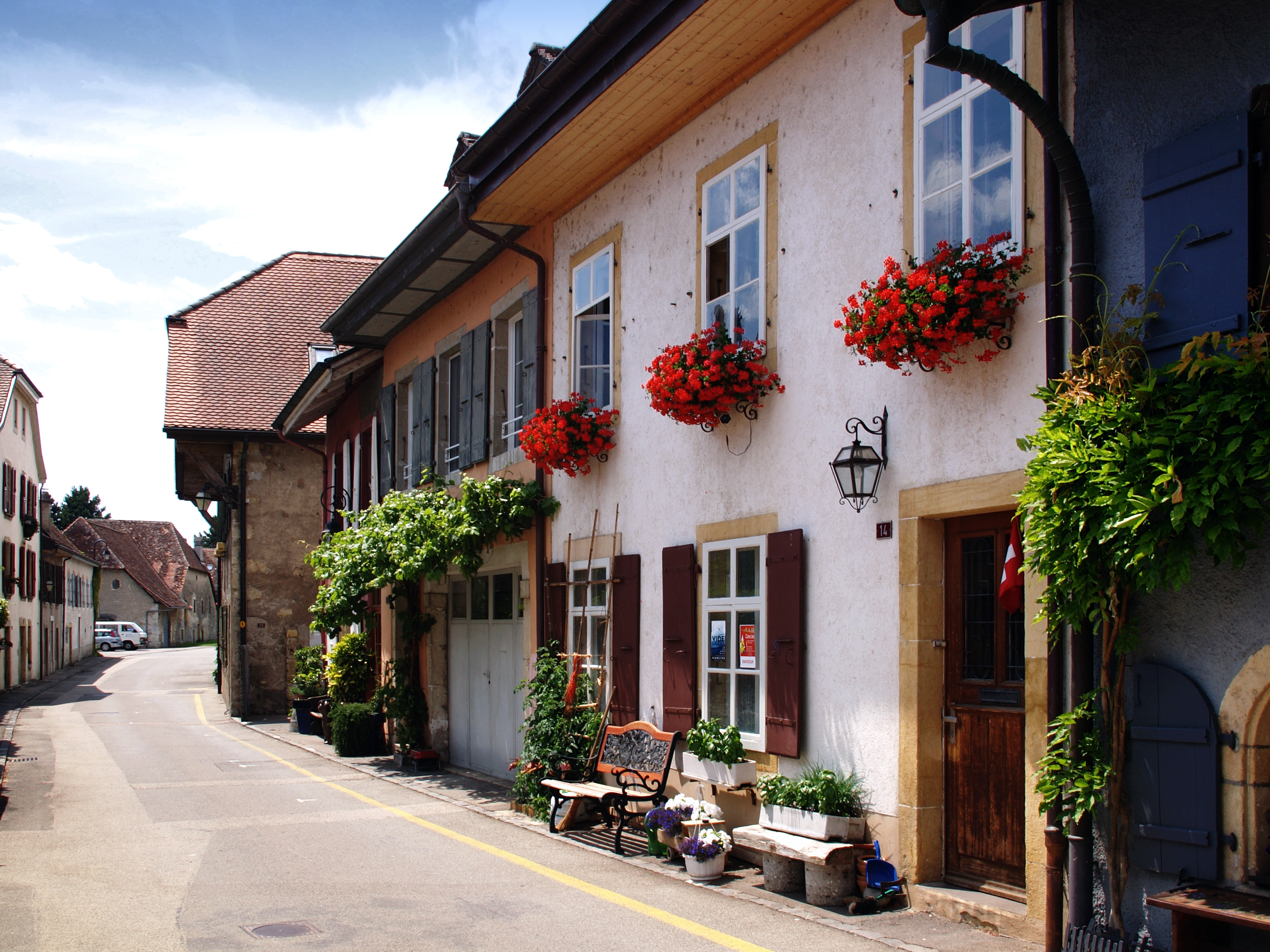
La Rive

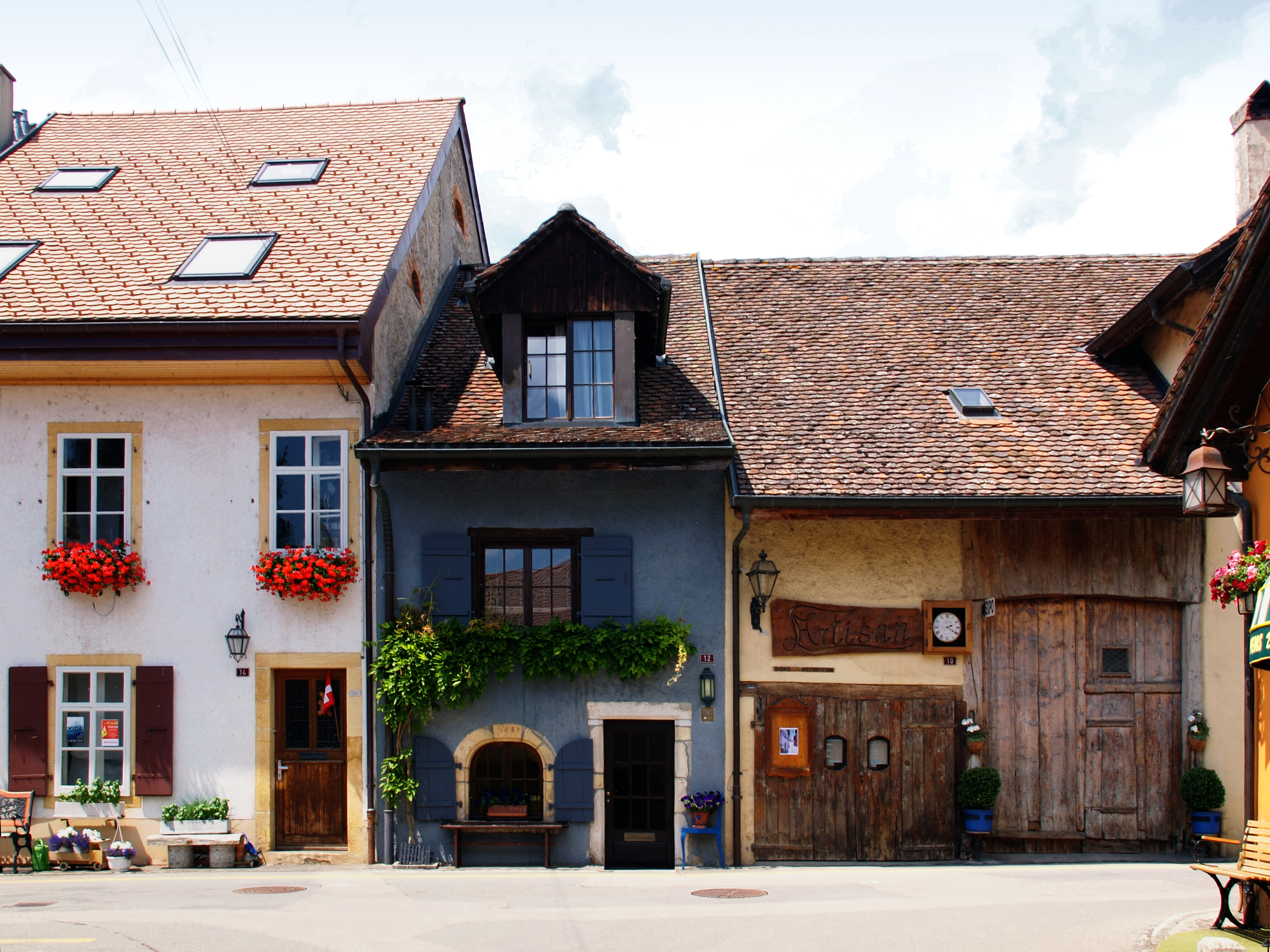
Houses at La Rive

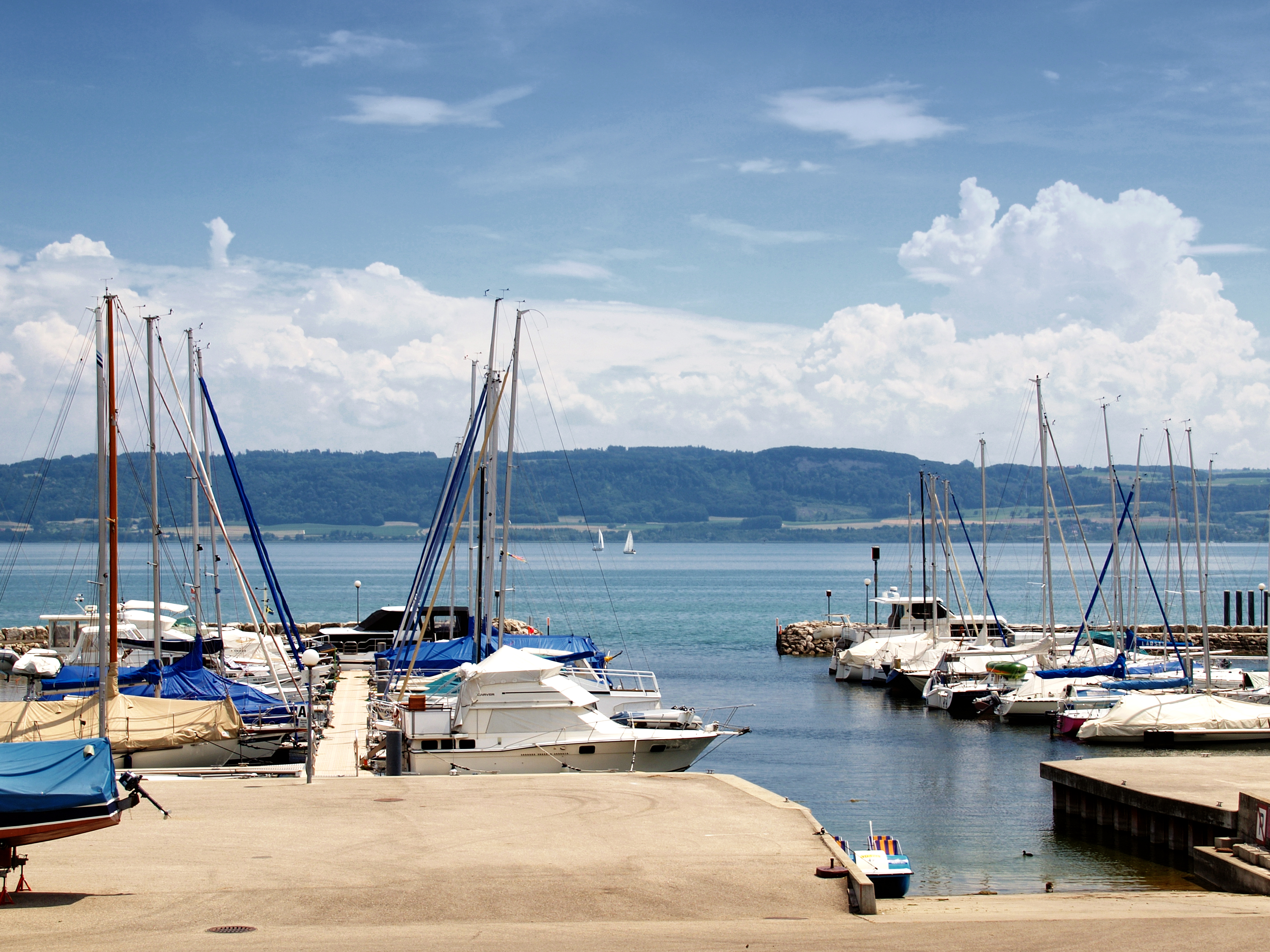
Concise marina

Concise has a population (as of December 2020) of 1,001. As of 2008, 12.9% of the population are resident foreign nationals. Over the last 10 years (1999–2009) the population has changed at a rate of 16.6%. It has changed at a rate of 12.6% due to migration and at a rate of 4.3% due to births and deaths.

Most of the population (as of 2000) speaks French (603 or 88.2%), with German being second most common (40 or 5.8%) and Portuguese being third (22 or 3.2%). There are 6 people who speak Italian.

Of the population in the municipality 173 or about 25.3% were born in Concise and lived there in 2000. There were 201 or 29.4% who were born in the same canton, while 198 or 28.9% were born somewhere else in Switzerland, and 103 or 15.1% were born outside of Switzerland.

In 2008 there were 6 live births to Swiss citizens and 1 birth to non-Swiss citizens, and in same time span there were 4 deaths of Swiss citizens. Ignoring immigration and emigration, the population of Swiss citizens increased by 2 while the foreign population increased by 1. There was 1 Swiss woman who emigrated from Switzerland. At the same time, there were 4 non-Swiss men and 4 non-Swiss women who immigrated from another country to Switzerland. The total Swiss population change in 2008 (from all sources, including moves across municipal borders) was an increase of 19 and the non-Swiss population increased by 8 people. This represents a population growth rate of 3.8%.

The age distribution, as of 2009, in Concise is; 90 children or 11.6% of the population are between 0 and 9 years old and 94 teenagers or 12.1% are between 10 and 19. Of the adult population, 85 people or 10.9% of the population are between 20 and 29 years old. 89 people or 11.4% are between 30 and 39, 139 people or 17.8% are between 40 and 49, and 87 people or 11.2% are between 50 and 59. The senior population distribution is 100 people or 12.8% of the population are between 60 and 69 years old, 59 people or 7.6% are between 70 and 79, there are 29 people or 3.7% who are between 80 and 89, and there are 7 people or 0.9% who are 90 and older.

As of 2000, there were 246 people who were single and never married in the municipality. There were 332 married individuals, 42 widows or widowers and 64 individuals who are divorced.

As of 2000, there were 289 private households in the municipality, and an average of 2.2 persons per household. There were 96 households that consist of only one person and 14 households with five or more people. Out of a total of 299 households that answered this question, 32.1% were households made up of just one person. Of the rest of the households, there are 84 married couples without children, 87 married couples with children There were 17 single parents with a child or children. There were 5 households that were made up of unrelated people and 10 households that were made up of some sort of institution or another collective housing.

In 2000 there were 122 single family homes (or 51.7% of the total) out of a total of 236 inhabited buildings. There were 54 multi-family buildings (22.9%), along with 35 multi-purpose buildings that were mostly used for housing (14.8%) and 25 other use buildings (commercial or industrial) that also had some housing (10.6%). Of the single family homes 58 were built before 1919, while 9 were built between 1990 and 2000. The most multi-family homes (36) were built before 1919 and the next most (7) were built between 1919 and 1945.

In 2000 there were 366 apartments in the municipality. The most common apartment size was 3 rooms of which there were 102. There were 11 single room apartments and 106 apartments with five or more rooms. Of these apartments, a total of 276 apartments (75.4% of the total) were permanently occupied, while 70 apartments (19.1%) were seasonally occupied and 20 apartments (5.5%) were empty. As of 2009, the construction rate of new housing units was 1.3 new units per 1000 residents. The vacancy rate for the municipality, in 2010, was 0.26%.

The historical population is given in the following chart:

== Heritage sites of national significance ==
The Ancienne Chartreuse De La Lance, the Roman era quarry at La Raisse/En Favarges and the bay and lakeshore neolithic and Bronze Age settlements of Sous-Colachoz are listed as Swiss heritage site of national significance. The entire village of Concise and the La Lance area are both part of the Inventory of Swiss Heritage Sites.

== Politics ==
In the 2007 federal election the most popular party was the SVP which received 29% of the vote. The next three most popular parties were the SP (16.82%), the FDP (13.96%) and the Green Party (13.45%). In the federal election, a total of 239 votes were cast, and the voter turnout was 49.8%.

== Economy ==
As of 2010, Concise had an unemployment rate of 3.6%. As of 2008, there were 65 people employed in the primary economic sector and about 14 businesses involved in this sector. 26 people were employed in the secondary sector and there were 7 businesses in this sector. 106 people were employed in the tertiary sector, with 25 businesses in this sector. There were 337 residents of the municipality who were employed in some capacity, of which females made up 44.5% of the workforce.

In 2008 the total number of full-time equivalent jobs was 134. The number of jobs in the primary sector was 36, of which 34 were in agriculture and 2 were in forestry or lumber production. The number of jobs in the secondary sector was 24 of which 13 or (54.2%) were in manufacturing and 11 (45.8%) were in construction. The number of jobs in the tertiary sector was 74. In the tertiary sector; 11 or 14.9% were in wholesale or retail sales or the repair of motor vehicles, 2 or 2.7% were in the movement and storage of goods, 8 or 10.8% were in a hotel or restaurant, 7 or 9.5% were the insurance or financial industry, 2 or 2.7% were technical professionals or scientists, 7 or 9.5% were in education and 25 or 33.8% were in health care.

In 2000, there were 70 workers who commuted into the municipality and 219 workers who commuted away. The municipality is a net exporter of workers, with about 3.1 workers leaving the municipality for every one entering. About 7.1% of the workforce coming into Concise are coming from outside Switzerland. Of the working population, 11% used public transportation to get to work, and 60.8% used a private car.

== Religion ==
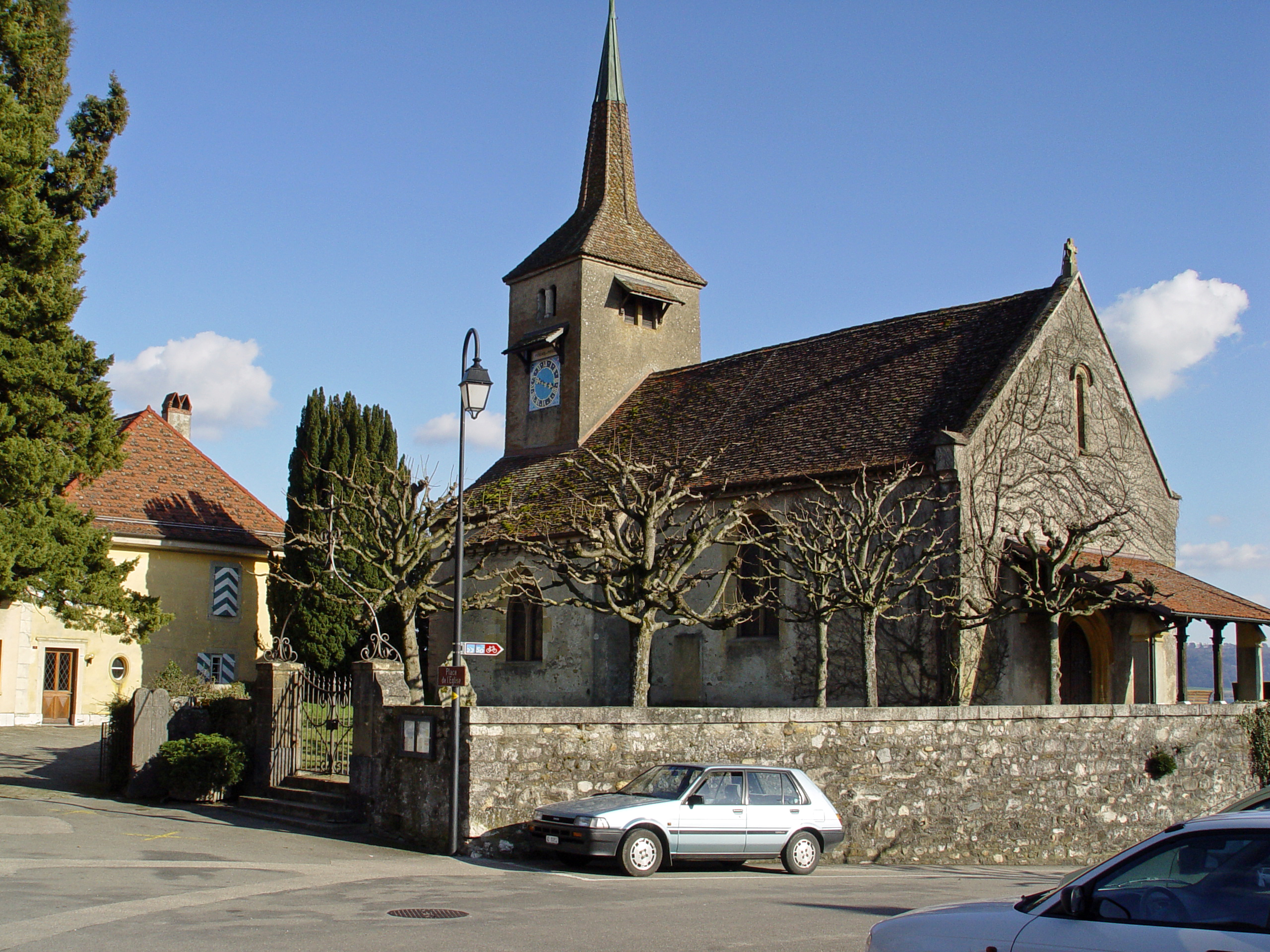
Church in Concise

From the 2000 census, 147 or 21.5% were Roman Catholic, while 394 or 57.6% belonged to the Swiss Reformed Church. Of the rest of the population, there were 4 members of an Orthodox church (or about 0.58% of the population), there was 1 individual who belongs to the Christian Catholic Church, and there were 12 individuals (or about 1.75% of the population) who belonged to another Christian church. There was 1 individual who was Jewish, and 4 (or about 0.58% of the population) who were Islamic. There was 1 person who was Buddhist and 1 individual who belonged to another church. 110 (or about 16.08% of the population) belonged to no church, are agnostic or atheist, and 15 individuals (or about 2.19% of the population) did not answer the question.

== Education ==
In Concise about 255 or (37.3%) of the population have completed non-mandatory upper secondary education, and 86 or (12.6%) have completed additional higher education (either university or a Fachhochschule). Of the 86 who completed tertiary schooling, 66.3% were Swiss men, 22.1% were Swiss women and 8.1% were non-Swiss women.

In the 2009/2010 school year there were a total of 117 students in the Concise school district. In the Vaud cantonal school system, two years of non-obligatory pre-school are provided by the political districts. During the school year, the political district provided pre-school care for a total of 578 children of which 359 children (62.1%) received subsidized pre-school care. The canton's primary school program requires students to attend for four years. There were 64 students in the municipal primary school program. The obligatory lower secondary school program lasts for six years and there were 52 students in those schools. There were also 1 students who were home schooled or attended another non-traditional school.

As of 2000, there were 69 students in Concise who came from another municipality, while 63 residents attended schools outside the municipality.
