= The Man with the Golden Helmet =

Painting of the circle of Rembrandt

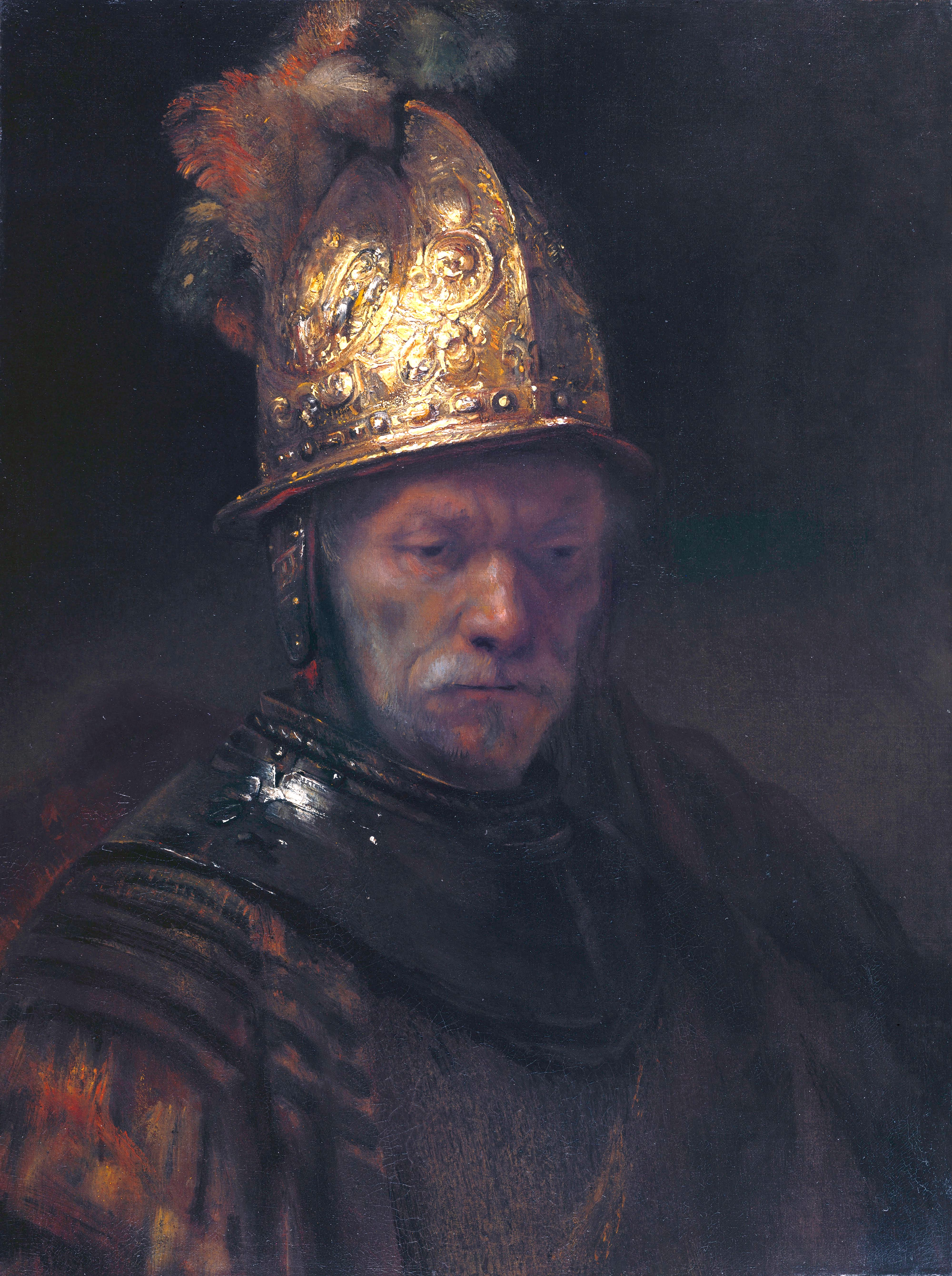
- Artist: Circle of Rembrandt
- Year: c. 1650
- Dimensions: 67.5 cm × 50.7 cm (26.6 in × 20.0 in)
- Location: Gemäldegalerie, Berlin, Berlin

The Man with the Golden Helmet (c. 1650) is an oil-on-canvas painting formerly attributed to the Dutch painter Rembrandt and today considered to be a work by someone in his circle. The Man with the Golden Helmet is an example of Dutch Golden Age painting and is now in the collection of the Gemäldegalerie, Berlin.

== Description ==
The picture shows an elderly man in front of a dark background with a striking golden helmet on his head.

The helmet is the dominant subject of the picture thanks to its color and light and the impasto application, against which the half-illuminated face and the dark background become less important.

== Attribution ==
Categorized as a work by Rembrandt for many years, doubts were expressed as to its provenance in 1984 by a Dutch curators' commission specifically created to investigate Rembrandt's works of questionable authenticity. They made their remarks while viewing the painting in West Berlin.

In November 1985, Berlin-based art expert Jan Kelch announced that important details in the painting's style did not match the style of Rembrandt's known works, and that the painting was probably painted in 1650 by one of Rembrandt's students.

"It is not a fake," Kelch averred. "It remains a great masterful work."

== Documentation ==
This painting was documented by Cornelis Hofstede de Groot in 1915, who wrote:

261. AN ELDERLY MAN WITH A GILT HELMET. B.-HdG. 356. He is turned a little to the right; his eyes are cast down. He wears a dark coat with purplish-red sleeves. On his head is a richly wrought gilt helmet with ear-pieces and a plume of short white and red feathers. Dark background. Strong light falls from the left at top on tin helmet and, touching the face as it passes, on the breast. Life size, half-length. The sitter is identified as Rembrandt's brother Adriaen. But as Adriaen was a poor shoemaker in Leyden while Rembrandt lived in Amsterdam, and as moreover Adriaen van Rijn died in 1652 while this model occurs in pictures of the year 1654, the identification is not very probable. Painted about 1650. See the notes to 384 and 442; cf. 420, 423.

Canvas, 26 1/2 inches by 20 1/2 inches.

Exhibited at Amsterdam, 1898, No. 75.

Mentioned by Bode, Oud Holland, 1891, p. 4; by Dr. Laban, Zeitschrift für bildende Kunst, 1898, pp. 73, etc.

Acquired from the De Boccard collection, Fribourg, Switzerland, by the London dealers P. and D. Colnaghi; bought from them in 1897 by the Kaiser Friedrich Museumverein, Berlin, and since exhibited--

In the Kaiser Friedrich Museum, Berlin, 1911 catalogue, No. 811A.
