= Onnens =

- Municipality
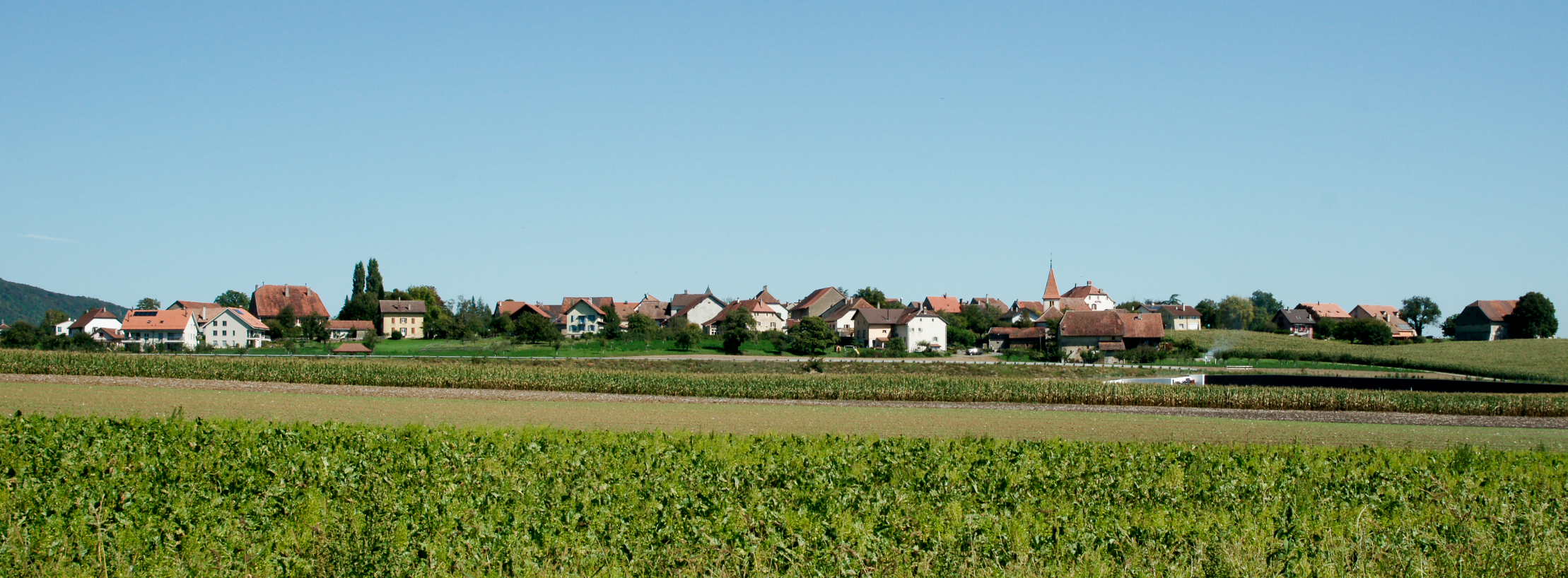

- Flag Coat of arms
- Location of Onnens
- Location within Switzerland Location within Canton of Vaud
- Coordinates: 46°50′N 06°41′E
- Country: Switzerland
- Canton: Vaud
- District: Jura-Nord Vaudois

Government
  - Mayor: Syndic; Alain Portner

Area
  - Total: 5.11 km^{2} (1.97 sq mi)
- Elevation: 471 m (1,545 ft)

Population (2004)
  - Total: 430
  - Density: 84/km^{2} (220/sq mi)
- Demonym: Les Bâveux
- Time zone: UTC+01:00 (CET)
  - Summer (DST): UTC+02:00 (CEST)
- Postal code: 1425
- SFOS number: 5565
- ISO 3166 code: CH-VD
- Surrounded by: Bonvillars, Corcelles-près-Concise
- Website: onnens.ch

Onnens (Arpitan: Onens [uˈnɛ̃]) is a municipality in the district of Jura-Nord Vaudois in the canton of Vaud in Switzerland.

== History ==
Onnens is first mentioned in 1228 as Unens.

== Geography ==
Aerial view (1949)

Onnens has an area, as of 2009, of 5.11 square kilometers (1.97 sq mi). Of this area, 2.13 km^{2} (0.82 sq mi) or 41.7% is used for agricultural purposes, while 2.52 km^{2} (0.97 sq mi) or 49.3% is forested. Of the rest of the land, 0.48 km^{2} (0.19 sq mi) or 9.4% is settled (buildings or roads).

Of the built up area, industrial buildings made up 2.3% of the total area while housing and buildings made up 2.7% and transportation infrastructure made up 2.0%. Power and water infrastructure as well as other special developed areas made up 2.3% of the area Out of the forested land, 47.9% of the total land area is heavily forested and 1.4% is covered with orchards or small clusters of trees. Of the agricultural land, 25.8% is used for growing crops and 10.2% is pastures, while 5.7% is used for orchards or vine crops.

The municipality was part of the Grandson District until it was dissolved on 31 August 2006, and Onnens became part of the new district of Jura-Nord Vaudois.

The municipality is located between the foot of Mont-Aubert and Lake Neuchatel.

The municipalities of Concise, Corcelles-près-Concise, Mutrux and Onnens are considering a merger 1 January 2014 into the new municipality of with an, as of 2011, undetermined name.

== Coat of arms ==
The blazon of the municipal coat of arms is Argent, a Crayfish Gulles declawed dexter. The missing crayfish claw can be found on the coat of arms of Montagny-pres-Yverdon and represents the division of the two municipalities.

== Demographics ==
Onnens has a population (as of December 2020) of 506. As of 2008, 14.2% of the population are resident foreign nationals. Over the last 10 years (1999–2009 ) the population has changed at a rate of 18.2%. It has changed at a rate of 10.5% due to migration and at a rate of 9.2% due to births and deaths.

Most of the population (as of 2000) speaks French (354 or 89.2%), with German being second most common (18 or 4.5%) and Portuguese being third (8 or 2.0%). There are 6 people who speak Italian.

Of the population in the municipality 97 or about 24.4% were born in Onnens and lived there in 2000. There were 145 or 36.5% who were born in the same canton, while 73 or 18.4% were born somewhere else in Switzerland, and 62 or 15.6% were born outside of Switzerland.

In 2008 there were 3 live births to Swiss citizens and 1 birth to non-Swiss citizens, and in same time span there was 1 death of a Swiss citizen and 1 non-Swiss citizen death. Ignoring immigration and emigration, the population of Swiss citizens increased by 2 while the foreign population remained the same. There were 2 Swiss men and 1 Swiss woman who emigrated from Switzerland. At the same time, there were 2 non-Swiss men and 1 non-Swiss woman who immigrated from another country to Switzerland. The total Swiss population change in 2008 (from all sources, including moves across municipal borders) was an increase of 2 and the non-Swiss population increased by 4 people. This represents a population growth rate of 1.3%.

The age distribution, as of 2009, in Onnens is; 66 children or 14.7% of the population are between 0 and 9 years old and 50 teenagers or 11.1% are between 10 and 19. Of the adult population, 49 people or 10.9% of the population are between 20 and 29 years old. 70 people or 15.6% are between 30 and 39, 77 people or 17.1% are between 40 and 49, and 48 people or 10.7% are between 50 and 59. The senior population distribution is 54 people or 12.0% of the population are between 60 and 69 years old, 19 people or 4.2% are between 70 and 79, there are 14 people or 3.1% who are between 80 and 89, and there are 2 people or 0.4% who are 90 and older.

As of 2000, there were 155 people who were single and never married in the municipality. There were 197 married individuals, 25 widows or widowers and 20 individuals who are divorced.

As of 2000, there were 160 private households in the municipality, and an average of 2.4 persons per household. There were 41 households that consist of only one person and 15 households with five or more people. Out of a total of 167 households that answered this question, 24.6% were households made up of just one person and there was 1 adult who lived with their parents. Of the rest of the households, there are 59 married couples without children, 47 married couples with children There were 8 single parents with a child or children. There were 4 households that were made up of unrelated people and 7 households that were made up of some sort of institution or another collective housing.

In 2000 there were 64 single family homes (or 53.8% of the total) out of a total of 119 inhabited buildings. There were 27 multi-family buildings (22.7%), along with 19 multi-purpose buildings that were mostly used for housing (16.0%) and 9 other use buildings (commercial or industrial) that also had some housing (7.6%). Of the single family homes 27 were built before 1919, while 6 were built between 1990 and 2000. The most multi-family homes (12) were built before 1919 and the next most (3) were built between 1946 and 1960. There was 1 multi-family house built between 1996 and 2000.

In 2000 there were 188 apartments in the municipality. The most common apartment size was 3 rooms of which there were 52. There were 5 single room apartments and 58 apartments with five or more rooms. Of these apartments, a total of 152 apartments (80.9% of the total) were permanently occupied, while 29 apartments (15.4%) were seasonally occupied and 7 apartments (3.7%) were empty. As of 2009, the construction rate of new housing units was 0 new units per 1000 residents. The vacancy rate for the municipality, in 2010, was 0%.

The historical population is given in the following chart:

== Heritage sites of national significance ==
The Swiss Reformed Church of Saint-Martin is listed as a Swiss heritage site of national significance. The entire village of Onnens is part of the Inventory of Swiss Heritage Sites.

== Politics ==
In the 2007 federal election the most popular party was the SP which received 29.83% of the vote. The next three most popular parties were the SVP (22.24%), the FDP (15.95%) and the Green Party (8.78%). In the federal election, a total of 126 votes were cast, and the voter turnout was 44.1%.

== Economy ==
As of 2010, Onnens had an unemployment rate of 4.6%. As of 2008, there were 34 people employed in the primary economic sector and about 10 businesses involved in this sector. 22 people were employed in the secondary sector and there were 3 businesses in this sector. 122 people were employed in the tertiary sector, with 14 businesses in this sector. There were 200 residents of the municipality who were employed in some capacity, of which females made up 39.5% of the workforce.

In 2008 the total number of full-time equivalent jobs was 157. The number of jobs in the primary sector was 27, of which 15 were in agriculture and 12 were in forestry or lumber production. The number of jobs in the secondary sector was 20 of which 19 or (95.0%) were in manufacturing and 1 was in construction. The number of jobs in the tertiary sector was 110. In the tertiary sector; 4 or 3.6% were in wholesale or retail sales or the repair of motor vehicles, 83 or 75.5% were in the movement and storage of goods, 13 or 11.8% were in a hotel or restaurant, 1 was in the information industry, 2 or 1.8% were technical professionals or scientists, 3 or 2.7% were in education.

In 2000, there were 201 workers who commuted into the municipality and 132 workers who commuted away. The municipality is a net importer of workers, with about 1.5 workers entering the municipality for every one leaving. Of the working population, 6.5% used public transportation to get to work, and 72% used a private car.

== Religion ==
From the 2000 census, 90 or 22.7% were Roman Catholic, while 225 or 56.7% belonged to the Swiss Reformed Church. Of the rest of the population, there were 14 individuals (or about 3.53% of the population) who belonged to another Christian church. There was 1 individual who was Islamic. There were 2 individuals who were Hindu. 48 (or about 12.09% of the population) belonged to no church, are agnostic or atheist, and 24 individuals (or about 6.05% of the population) did not answer the question.

== Education ==
In Onnens about 147 or (37.0%) of the population have completed non-mandatory upper secondary education, and 43 or (10.8%) have completed additional higher education (either university or a Fachhochschule). Of the 43 who completed tertiary schooling, 55.8% were Swiss men, 32.6% were Swiss women.

In the 2009/2010 school year there were a total of 62 students in the Onnens (VD) school district. In the Vaud cantonal school system, two years of non-obligatory pre-school are provided by the political districts. During the school year, the political district provided pre-school care for a total of 578 children of which 359 children (62.1%) received subsidized pre-school care. The canton's primary school program requires students to attend for four years. There were 39 students in the municipal primary school program. The obligatory lower secondary school program lasts for six years and there were 23 students in those schools.

As of 2000, there were 22 students in Onnens who came from another municipality, while 60 residents attended schools outside the municipality.
