= Jeannine de Boccard =

Swiss women's rights activist (1922–2020)

- Born: Jeanne-Marie Perréard; 28 March 1922; Geneva, Switzerland
- Died: 16 February 2020 (aged 97); Geneva, Switzerland
- Occupations: Jurist, women's rights activist
- Spouse: Pierre de Boccard

Jeannine de Boccard (née Jeanne-Marie Perréard; 28 March 1922 – 16 February 2020) was a Swiss jurist and women's rights activist who held leading positions in national and international women's organizations.

== Biography ==
Jeanne-Marie Perréard was the daughter of François Perréard and of Marie Jeanne Etiennette née Bayard. She married Pierre de Boccard, son of André de Boccard. After attending the gymnasium in Geneva, she studied law at the University of Geneva (1942–1945) and then worked as a legal assistant in the Division of International Organizations of the Political Department.

De Boccard was a member of the liaison center of Geneva Women's Association Liaison Center and of the central committee of the Alliance of Swiss Women's Societies (1977–1989). From 1979 to 1997 she sat on the International Council of Women (ICW), of which she was vice-president from 1991. Appointed permanent representative of the ICW and of Liberal International to the United Nations in Geneva, she took part as an observer in several international conferences, including the second and third World Conferences on Women (Copenhagen 1980, Nairobi 1985), the International Labour Conferences from 1992, the Rio de Janeiro summit of 1992, the Vienna conference on human rights of 1993, and the sessions of the UN Commission on Human Rights in Geneva.

== Works ==
- Bal à la SDN, 1997
