= François Perréard =

Swiss politician (1892–1974)

Member of the Council of States
- In office 1955–1963

Member of the National Council
- In office 1939–1955

Member of the Council of State of Geneva
- In office 1936–1957

Personal details
- Born: 29 September 1892 Chêne-Bourg, Switzerland
- Died: 21 August 1974 (aged 81) Geneva, Switzerland
- Party: Radical

François Perréard (29 September 1892 – 21 August 1974) was a Swiss Radical politician from Geneva. He served on the cantonal government of Geneva and in both chambers of the Federal Assembly.

== Biography ==
Perréard was the son of Jules François Perréard. He married Marie Jeanne Etiennette Bayard, daughter of Oscar Constant, a stonemason. He studied law at Geneva, Freiburg im Breisgau, and Berlin. As a substitute public prosecutor (1916–1919), he was charged with a study on the consequences of the general strike of 1918.

A Radical deputy in the Grand Council of Geneva (1919–1936), Perréard was elected to the cantonal executive (1936–1957, in charge of finances) on the Entente Nationale list. He served in the National Council (1939–1955) and the Council of States (1955–1963). He restored the finances of the canton of Geneva, which had been ruined by the economic crisis.

== Works ==
- Genève 1936–1957: souvenirs d'un ancien conseiller d'État, 1972

== Bibliography ==
- Tribune de Genève, 29 November 1956; 29/30 September 1962; 26/27 October 1974
