= Jules François Perréard =

Swiss politician (1862–1930)

Member of the National Council
- In office 1908–1911

Member of the Council of State of Geneva
- In office 1906–1912

Personal details
- Born: 13 June 1862 Thônex, Switzerland
- Died: 14 November 1930 (aged 68) Soral, Switzerland
- Party: Radical

Jules François Perréard (13 June 1862 – 14 November 1930) was a Swiss Radical politician and cigar manufacturer from Chêne-Bourg, in the canton of Geneva.

== Biography ==
Perréard was the son of François, a member of the cantonal government, and of Joséphine Côte. He married Jeanne Rojoux, daughter of Charles, a merchant. After obtaining his Matura at the college of Geneva, he served an apprenticeship in the tobacco industry at Bremen. On his return, he succeeded his father as director of a cigar factory at Chêne-Bourg.

Perréard was mayor of Anières (1898–1902) and of Chêne-Bourg (1902–1906). A Radical deputy in the Grand Council of Geneva (1905–1913), he was a member of the cantonal executive (1906–1912, in charge of commerce and industry, public education, and the interior and military affairs, and president in 1911), and sat in the National Council (1908–1911). He became the representative in Switzerland of the French tobacco monopoly (1912) and, in collaboration with the Swiss customs authorities, designed the taxation of tobacco (1921). He was a great promoter of the separation of church and state.

== Bibliography ==
- Gruner, L'Assemblée fédérale suisse, 1, 961
