= Mutrux =

- Municipality
- Flag Coat of arms
- Location of Mutrux
- Location within Switzerland Location within Canton of Vaud
- Coordinates: 46°53′N 06°43′E
- Country: Switzerland
- Canton: Vaud
- District: Jura-Nord Vaudois

Government
  - Mayor: Syndic; Didier Delay

Area
  - Total: 3.21 km^{2} (1.24 sq mi)
- Elevation: 749 m (2,457 ft)

Population (2004)
  - Total: 137
  - Density: 42.7/km^{2} (111/sq mi)
- Demonym: Les Chats borgnes
- Time zone: UTC+01:00 (CET)
  - Summer (DST): UTC+02:00 (CEST)
- Postal code: 1428
- SFOS number: 5563
- ISO 3166 code: CH-VD
- Surrounded by: Provence, Fresens (NE), Vaumarcus (NE), Concise
- Website: website missing Profile (in French), SFSO statistics

Mutrux is a municipality in the district of Jura-Nord Vaudois in the canton of Vaud in Switzerland.

== History ==
Mutrux is first mentioned in 1309 as Mostrue. In 1359 it was mentioned as Mustrueu.

== Geography ==
Mutrux has an area, as of 2009, of 3.21 square kilometers (1.24 sq mi). Of this area, 1.1 km^{2} (0.42 sq mi) or 34.3% is used for agricultural purposes, while 2.01 km^{2} (0.78 sq mi) or 62.6% is forested. Of the rest of the land, 0.11 km^{2} (27 acres) or 3.4% is settled (buildings or roads).

Of the built up area, housing and buildings made up 1.6% and transportation infrastructure made up 1.2%. Out of the forested land, 61.1% of the total land area is heavily forested and 1.6% is covered with orchards or small clusters of trees. Of the agricultural land, 20.6% is used for growing crops and 8.1% is pastures and 4.7% is used for alpine pastures.

The municipality was part of the Grandson District until it was dissolved on 31 August 2006, and Mutrux became part of the new district of Jura-Nord Vaudois.

The municipality is located in the north-east of the district at the foot of Mont Aubert.

The municipalities of Concise, Corcelles-près-Concise, Mutrux and Onnens are considering a merger 1 January 2014 into the new municipality of with an, as of 2011, undetermined name.

== Coat of arms ==
The blazon of the municipal coat of arms is Vert, a Chapel Argent roofed Gules and topped with a Cross Or.

== Demographics ==
Mutrux has a population (as of December 2020) of 148. As of 2008, 4.1% of the population are resident foreign nationals. Over the last 10 years (1999–2009 ) the population has changed at a rate of 8.9%. It has changed at a rate of 12.1% due to migration and at a rate of -3.2% due to births and deaths.

Most of the population (as of 2000) speaks French (112 or 99.1%) with the rest speaking Spanish

Of the population in the municipality 42 or about 37.2% were born in Mutrux and lived there in 2000. There were 39 or 34.5% who were born in the same canton, while 24 or 21.2% were born somewhere else in Switzerland, and 6 or 5.3% were born outside of Switzerland.

In 2008 there was 1 Swiss man and 1 Swiss woman who emigrated from Switzerland. The total Swiss population change in 2008 (from all sources, including moves across municipal borders) was an increase of 3 and the non-Swiss population remained the same. This represents a population growth rate of 2.1%.

The age distribution, as of 2009, in Mutrux is; 16 children or 11.9% of the population are between 0 and 9 years old and 21 teenagers or 15.6% are between 10 and 19. Of the adult population, 15 people or 11.1% of the population are between 20 and 29 years old. 16 people or 11.9% are between 30 and 39, 13 people or 9.6% are between 40 and 49, and 18 people or 13.3% are between 50 and 59. The senior population distribution is 15 people or 11.1% of the population are between 60 and 69 years old, 17 people or 12.6% are between 70 and 79, there are 4 people or 3.0% who are between 80 and 89.

As of 2000, there were 48 people who were single and never married in the municipality. There were 58 married individuals, 4 widows or widowers and 3 individuals who are divorced.

As of 2000, there were 41 private households in the municipality, and an average of 2.8 persons per household. There were 8 households that consist of only one person and 6 households with five or more people. Out of a total of 41 households that answered this question, 19.5% were households made up of just one person. Of the rest of the households, there are 13 married couples without children, 17 married couples with children There were 2 single parents with a child or children. There was 1 household that was made up of unrelated people.

In 2000 there were 17 single family homes (or 41.5% of the total) out of a total of 41 inhabited buildings. There were 7 multi-family buildings (17.1%), along with 15 multi-purpose buildings that were mostly used for housing (36.6%) and 2 other use buildings (commercial or industrial) that also had some housing (4.9%). Of the single family homes 8 were built before 1919, while 1 was built between 1990 and 2000. The greatest number of multi-family homes (2) were built before 1919 and again between 1946 and 1960

In 2000 there were 59 apartments in the municipality. The most common apartment size was 3 rooms of which there were 18. There were single room apartments and 16 apartments with five or more rooms. Of these apartments, a total of 41 apartments (69.5% of the total) were permanently occupied, while 12 apartments (20.3%) were seasonally occupied and 6 apartments (10.2%) were empty. As of 2009, the construction rate of new housing units was 0 new units per 1000 residents. The vacancy rate for the municipality, in 2010, was 0%.

The historical population is given in the following chart:

== Politics ==
In the 2007 federal election the most popular party was the SVP which received 37.9% of the vote. The next three most popular parties were the SP (15.76%), the Green Party (12.58%) and the PdA Party (11.62%). In the federal election, a total of 37 votes were cast, and the voter turnout was 37.8%.

== Economy ==
As of 2010, Mutrux had an unemployment rate of 1.2%. As of 2008, there were 12 people employed in the primary economic sector and about 3 businesses involved in this sector. 2 people were employed in the secondary sector and there was 1 business in this sector. 5 people were employed in the tertiary sector, with 3 businesses in this sector. There were 54 residents of the municipality who were employed in some capacity, of which females made up 40.7% of the workforce.

In 2008 the total number of full-time equivalent jobs was 14. The number of jobs in the primary sector was 8, all of which were in agriculture. The number of jobs in the secondary sector was 2, all of which were in construction. The number of jobs in the tertiary sector was 4, of which 3 were in wholesale or retail sales or the repair of motor vehicles and 1 was in a hotel or restaurant.

In 2000, there were 30 workers who commuted away from the municipality. Of the working population, 13% used public transportation to get to work, and 38.9% used a private car.

== Religion ==
From the 2000 census, 9 or 8.0% were Roman Catholic, while 90 or 79.6% belonged to the Swiss Reformed Church. Of the rest of the population, there were 10 individuals (or about 8.85% of the population) who belonged to another Christian church. 4 (or about 3.54% of the population) belonged to no church, are agnostic or atheist, and 5 individuals (or about 4.42% of the population) did not answer the question.

== Education ==
In Mutrux, about 36 or (31.9%) of the population have completed non-mandatory upper secondary education, and 7 or (6.2%) have completed additional higher education (either university or a Fachhochschule). Of the 7 who completed tertiary schooling, 71.4% were men and 28.6% were women.

In the 2009/2010 school year there were a total of 27 students in the Mutrux school district. In the Vaud cantonal school system, two years of non-obligatory pre-school are provided by the political districts. During the school year, the political district provided pre-school care for a total of 578 children, of which 359 children (62.1%) received subsidized pre-school care. The canton's primary school program requires students to attend for four years. There were 13 students in the municipal primary school program. The obligatory lower secondary school program lasts for six years and there were 14 students in those schools.

As of 2000, there were 25 students from Mutrux who attended schools outside the municipality.
