= Corcelles-près-Concise =

- Municipality
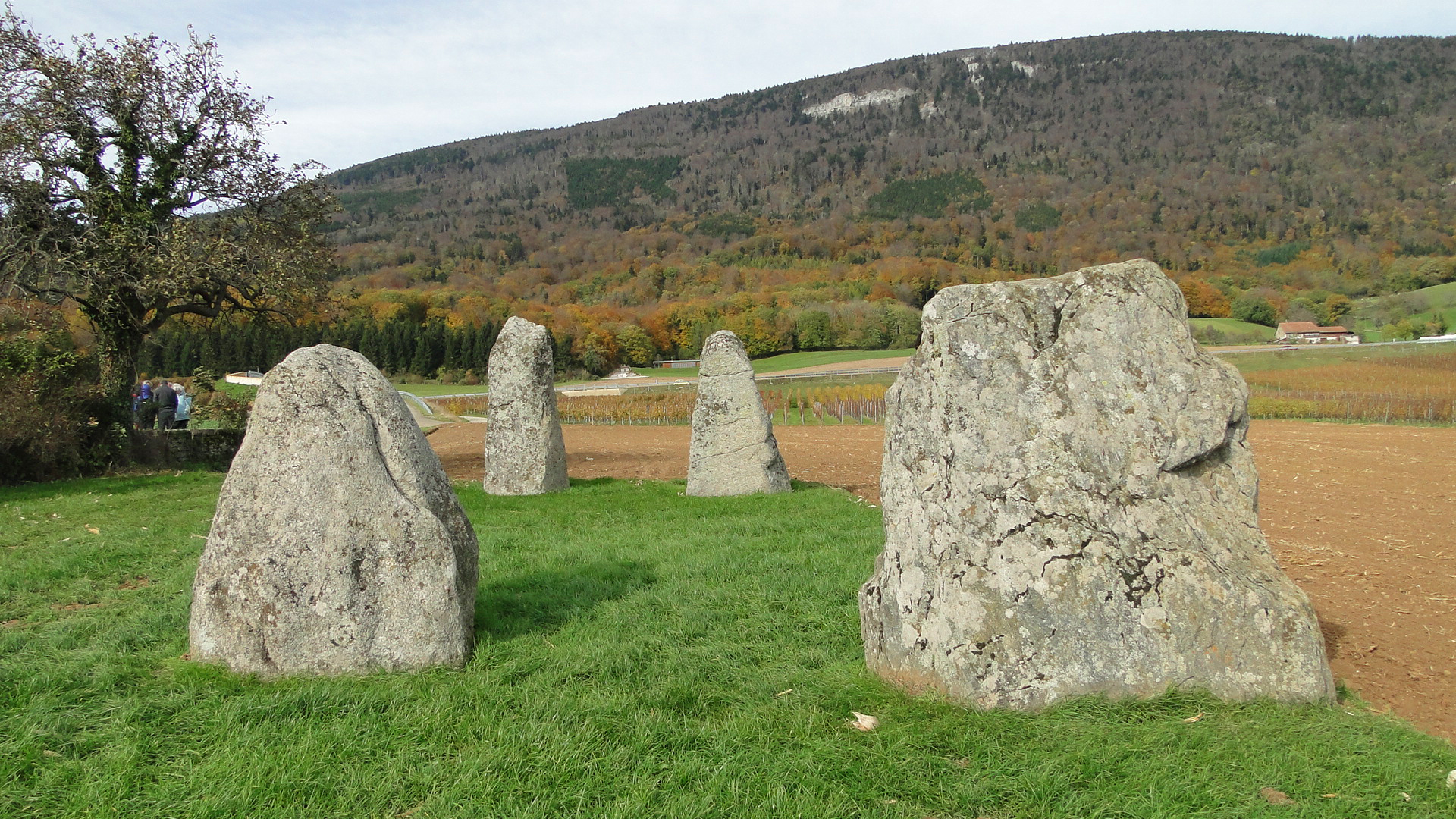

- Flag Coat of arms
- Location of Corcelles-près-Concise
- Location within Switzerland Location within Canton of Vaud
- Coordinates: 46°50′N 06°42′E
- Country: Switzerland
- Canton: Vaud
- District: Jura-Nord Vaudois

Government
  - Mayor: Syndic; M. Jacques Kehrli

Area
  - Total: 4.09 km^{2} (1.58 sq mi)
- Elevation: 459 m (1,506 ft)

Population (2004)
  - Total: 273
  - Density: 66.7/km^{2} (173/sq mi)
- Demonym(s): Les Corcellois; Les Casse-écuelles; Les Couennati
- Time zone: UTC+01:00 (CET)
  - Summer (DST): UTC+02:00 (CEST)
- Postal code: 1426
- SFOS number: 5555
- ISO 3166 code: CH-VD
- Surrounded by: Concise, Onnens, Bonvillars
- Website: corcelles-concise.ch

Corcelles-près-Concise is a municipality in the district of Jura-Nord Vaudois in the canton of Vaud in Switzerland.

== History ==
Corcelles-près-Concise is first mentioned in 885 as Corceles. In 888 it was mentioned as Corcella.

== Geography ==
Corcelles-près-Concise has an area, as of 2009, of 4.09 square kilometers (1.58 sq mi). Of this area, 1.87 km^{2} (0.72 sq mi) or 45.7% is used for agricultural purposes, while 1.7 km^{2} (0.66 sq mi) or 41.6% is forested. Of the rest of the land, 0.51 km^{2} (0.20 sq mi) or 12.5% is settled (buildings or roads), 0.01 km^{2} (2.5 acres) or 0.2% is either rivers or lakes.

Of the built up area, housing and buildings made up 5.4% and transportation infrastructure made up 4.6%. Power and water infrastructure as well as other special developed areas made up 2.2% of the area Out of the forested land, all of the forested land area is covered with heavy forests. Of the agricultural land, 29.8% is used for growing crops and 8.6% is pastures, while 6.4% is used for orchards or vine crops. All the water in the municipality is in lakes.

The municipality was part of the Grandson District until it was dissolved on 31 August 2006, and Corcelles-près-Concise became part of the new district of Jura-Nord Vaudois.

The grape and grain growing municipality is located between Lake Neuchatel and Mont Aubert.

The municipalities of Concise, Corcelles-près-Concise, Mutrux and Onnens are considering a merger 1 January 2014 into a new municipality with an, as of 2011, undetermined name.

== Coat of arms ==
The blazon of the municipal coat of arms is Gules, on a pale Argent a Griffin coward Sable langued and armed of the second, in chief Fleur-de-Lys of the third.

== Demographics ==
Corcelles-près-Concise has a population (as of December 2020) of 418. As of 2008, 8.7% of the population are resident foreign nationals. Over the last 10 years (1999–2009) the population has changed at a rate of -1.5%. It has changed at a rate of 7.4% due to migration and at a rate of -8.1% due to births and deaths.

Most of the population (as of 2000) speaks French (266 or 95.7%), with German being second most common (10 or 3.6%) and English being third (2 or 0.7%).

Of the population in the municipality 90 or about 32.4% were born in Corcelles-près-Concise and lived there in 2000. There were 81 or 29.1% who were born in the same canton, while 69 or 24.8% were born somewhere else in Switzerland, and 31 or 11.2% were born outside of Switzerland.

In 2008 there were 2 live births to Swiss citizens and 1 birth to non-Swiss citizens, and in same time span there were 5 deaths of Swiss citizens and 1 non-Swiss citizen death. Ignoring immigration and emigration, the population of Swiss citizens decreased by 3 while the foreign population remained the same. At the same time, there was 1 non-Swiss man and 1 non-Swiss woman who immigrated from another country to Switzerland. The total Swiss population change in 2008 (from all sources, including moves across municipal borders) was an increase of 9 and the non-Swiss population decreased by 1 people. This represents a population growth rate of 2.9%.

The age distribution, as of 2009, in Corcelles-près-Concise is; 27 children or 10.1% of the population are between 0 and 9 years old and 32 teenagers or 11.9% are between 10 and 19. Of the adult population, 25 people or 9.3% of the population are between 20 and 29 years old. 31 people or 11.6% are between 30 and 39, 39 people or 14.6% are between 40 and 49, and 37 people or 13.8% are between 50 and 59. The senior population distribution is 32 people or 11.9% of the population are between 60 and 69 years old, 29 people or 10.8% are between 70 and 79, there are 15 people or 5.6% who are between 80 and 89, and there is 1 person who is 90 and older.

As of 2000, there were 124 people who were single and never married in the municipality. There were 121 married individuals, 22 widows or widowers and 11 individuals who are divorced.

As of 2000, there were 88 private households in the municipality, and an average of 2.9 persons per household. There were 19 households that consist of only one person and 13 households with five or more people. Out of a total of 89 households that answered this question, 21.3% were households made up of just one person. Of the rest of the households, there are 18 married couples without children, 46 married couples with children There were 5 single parents with a child or children.

In 2000 there were 84 single family homes (or 67.7% of the total) out of a total of 124 inhabited buildings. There were 13 multi-family buildings (10.5%), along with 21 multi-purpose buildings that were mostly used for housing (16.9%) and 6 other use buildings (commercial or industrial) that also had some housing (4.8%). Of the single family homes 23 were built before 1919, while 4 were built between 1990 and 2000. The most multi-family homes (5) were built before 1919 and the next most (3) were built between 1946 and 1960.

In 2000 there were 155 apartments in the municipality. The most common apartment size was 4 rooms of which there were 47. There were 6 single room apartments and 52 apartments with five or more rooms. Of these apartments, a total of 85 apartments (54.8% of the total) were permanently occupied, while 65 apartments (41.9%) were seasonally occupied and 5 apartments (3.2%) were empty. As of 2009, the construction rate of new housing units was 0 new units per 1000 residents. The vacancy rate for the municipality, in 2010, was 0%.

The historical population is given in the following chart:

== Sights ==
The entire village of Corcelles-près-Concise is designated as part of the Inventory of Swiss Heritage Sites.

The prehistoric settlement at Stations de Concise is part of the Prehistoric Pile dwellings around the Alps a UNESCO World Heritage Site.

== Twin town ==
Corcelles-près-Concise is twinned with the town of Saint-Martin-sous-Montaigu, France.

== Politics ==
In the 2007 federal election the most popular party was the SP which received 28.75% of the vote. The next three most popular parties were the SVP (21.18%), the Green Party (16.9%) and the FDP (15.64%). In the federal election, a total of 84 votes were cast, and the voter turnout was 44.7%.

== Economy ==
As of 2010, Corcelles-près-Concise had an unemployment rate of 2%. As of 2008, there were 35 people employed in the primary economic sector and about 13 businesses involved in this sector. 7 people were employed in the secondary sector and there were 4 businesses in this sector. 52 people were employed in the tertiary sector, with 5 businesses in this sector. There were 130 residents of the municipality who were employed in some capacity, of which females made up 43.1% of the workforce.

In 2008 the total number of full-time equivalent jobs was 71. The number of jobs in the primary sector was 26, of which 22 were in agriculture and 3 were in fishing or fisheries. The number of jobs in the secondary sector was 6 of which 2 or (33.3%) were in manufacturing and 4 (66.7%) were in construction. The number of jobs in the tertiary sector was 39. In the tertiary sector; 1 was in the sale or repair of motor vehicles, 1 was a technical professional or scientist, 1 was in education and 36 or 92.3% were in health care.

In 2000, there were 36 workers who commuted into the municipality and 95 workers who commuted away. The municipality is a net exporter of workers, with about 2.6 workers leaving the municipality for every one entering. Of the working population, 13.1% used public transportation to get to work, and 63.8% used a private car.

== Religion ==
From the 2000 census, 44 or 15.8% were Roman Catholic, while 183 or 65.8% belonged to the Swiss Reformed Church. Of the rest of the population, there was 1 member of an Orthodox church, and there were 20 individuals (or about 7.19% of the population) who belonged to another Christian church. 32 (or about 11.51% of the population) belonged to no church, are agnostic or atheist, and 8 individuals (or about 2.88% of the population) did not answer the question.

== Education ==
In Corcelles-près-Concise about 97 or (34.9%) of the population have completed non-mandatory upper secondary education, and 39 or (14.0%) have completed additional higher education (either university or a Fachhochschule). Of the 39 who completed tertiary schooling, 61.5% were Swiss men, 25.6% were Swiss women.

In the 2009/2010 school year there were a total of 28 students in the Corcelles-près-Concise school district. In the Vaud cantonal school system, two years of non-obligatory pre-school are provided by the political districts. During the school year, the political district provided pre-school care for a total of 578 children of which 359 children (62.1%) received subsidized pre-school care. The canton's primary school program requires students to attend for four years. There were 14 students in the municipal primary school program. The obligatory lower secondary school program lasts for six years and there were 14 students in those schools.

As of 2000, there were 11 students in Corcelles-près-Concise who came from another municipality, while 59 residents attended schools outside the municipality.
