= List of municipalities of Switzerland =

This is an alphabetical list of the 2,110 municipalities of Switzerland, updated (as of January 2026).

Municipalities of Switzerland
Municipality	Canton
Aarburg	Aargau
Aarwangen	Bern
Abtwil	Aargau
Aclens	Vaud
Acquarossa	Ticino
Adelboden	Bern
Adligenswil	Lucerne
Adliswil	Zürich
Aedermannsdorf	Solothurn
Aefligen	Bern
Aegerten	Bern
Aesch	Basel-Landschaft
Aesch	Lucerne
Aesch	Zürich
Aeschi	Solothurn
Aeschi bei Spiez	Bern
Aeugst am Albis	Zürich
Affeltrangen	Thurgau
Affoltern am Albis	Zürich
Affoltern im Emmental	Bern
Agarn	Valais
Agiez	Vaud
Agno	Ticino
Aigle	Vaud
Aire-la-Ville	Geneva
Airolo	Ticino
Alberswil	Lucerne
Albinen	Valais
Albula/Alvra	Graubünden
Alchenstorf	Bern
Allaman	Vaud
Alle	Jura
Allmendingen bei Bern	Bern
Allschwil	Basel-Landschaft
Alpnach	Obwalden
Alpthal	Schwyz
Altbüron	Lucerne
Altdorf	Uri
Altendorf	Schwyz
Altikon	Zürich
Altishofen	Lucerne
Altnau	Thurgau
Alto Malcantone	Ticino
Altstätten	St. Gallen
Amden	St. Gallen
Amlikon-Bissegg	Thurgau
Ammerswil	Aargau
Amriswil	Thurgau
Amsoldingen	Bern
Andeer	Graubünden
Andelfingen	Zürich
Andermatt	Uri
Andwil	St. Gallen
Anières	Geneva
Anniviers	Valais
Anwil	Basel-Landschaft
Appenzell	Appenzell Innerrhoden
Aranno	Ticino
Arbaz	Valais
Arbedo-Castione	Ticino
Arboldswil	Basel-Landschaft
Arbon	Thurgau
Arch	Bern
Ardon	Valais
Arisdorf	Basel-Landschaft
Aristau	Aargau
Arlesheim	Basel-Landschaft
Arnex-sur-Nyon	Vaud
Arnex-sur-Orbe	Vaud
Arni	Aargau
Arni	Bern
Arogno	Ticino
Arosa	Graubünden
Arth	Schwyz
Arzier-Le Muids	Vaud
Ascona	Ticino
Assens	Vaud
Attalens	Fribourg
Attinghausen	Uri
Attiswil	Bern
Au	St. Gallen
Aubonne	Vaud
Auenstein	Aargau
Augst	Basel-Landschaft
Ausserberg	Valais
Auswil	Bern
Autigny	Fribourg
Auw	Aargau
Avegno Gordevio	Ticino
Avenches	Vaud
Avers	Graubünden
Avry	Fribourg
Avully	Geneva
Avusy	Geneva
Ayent	Valais
Baar	Zug
Bachs	Zürich
Bad Ragaz	St. Gallen
Baden	Aargau
Balerna	Ticino
Balgach	St. Gallen
Ballaigues	Vaud
Ballens	Vaud
Ballwil	Lucerne
Balm bei Günsberg	Solothurn
Balsthal	Solothurn
Baltschieder	Valais
Bannwil	Bern
Bardonnex	Geneva
Bäretswil	Zürich
Bargen	Bern
Bargen	Schaffhausen
Bäriswil	Bern
Bärschwil	Solothurn
Bas-Intyamon	Fribourg
Basadingen-Schlattingen	Thurgau
Basel	Basel-Stadt
Basse-Allaine	Jura
Basse-Vendline	Jura
Bassersdorf	Zürich
Bassins	Vaud
Bätterkinden	Bern
Bättwil	Solothurn
Baulmes	Vaud
Bauma	Zürich
Bavois	Vaud
Beatenberg	Bern
Beckenried	Nidwalden
Bedano	Ticino
Bedretto	Ticino
Beggingen	Schaffhausen
Begnins	Vaud
Beinwil (Freiamt)	Aargau
Beinwil	Solothurn
Beinwil am See	Aargau
Belfaux	Fribourg
Bellach	Solothurn
Bellevue	Geneva
Bellikon	Aargau
Bellinzona	Ticino
Bellmund	Bern
Bellwald	Valais
Belmont-Broye	Fribourg
Belmont-sur-Lausanne	Vaud
Belmont-sur-Yverdon	Vaud
Belp	Bern
Belprahon	Bern
Benken	St. Gallen
Benken	Zürich
Bennwil	Basel-Landschaft
Bercher	Vaud
Berg	St. Gallen
Berg	Thurgau
Berg am Irchel	Zürich
Bergdietikon	Aargau
Bergün Filisur	Graubünden
Berikon	Aargau
Beringen	Schaffhausen
Berken	Bern
Berlingen	Thurgau
Bern	Bern
Berneck	St. Gallen
Bernex	Geneva
Berolle	Vaud
Beromünster	Lucerne
Besenbüren	Aargau
Bettenhausen	Bern
Bettens	Vaud
Bettingen	Basel-Stadt
Bettlach	Solothurn
Bettmeralp	Valais
Bettwiesen	Thurgau
Bettwil	Aargau
Bever	Graubünden
Bex	Vaud
Biasca	Ticino
Biberist	Solothurn
Biberstein	Aargau
Bichelsee-Balterswil	Thurgau
Biel-Benken	Basel-Landschaft
Biel/Bienne	Bern
Bière	Vaud
Biezwil	Solothurn
Biglen	Bern
Billens-Hennens	Fribourg
Binn	Valais
Binningen	Basel-Landschaft
Bioggio	Ticino
Bioley-Magnoux	Vaud
Birmensdorf	Zürich
Birmenstorf	Aargau
Birr	Aargau
Birrhard	Aargau
Birrwil	Aargau
Birsfelden	Basel-Landschaft
Birwinken	Thurgau
Bischofszell	Thurgau
Bissone	Ticino
Bister	Valais
Bitsch	Valais
Blatten	Valais
Blauen	Basel-Landschaft
Bleienbach	Bern
Blenio	Ticino
Blonay – Saint-Légier	Vaud
Blumenstein	Bern
Böckten	Basel-Landschaft
Boécourt	Jura
Bofflens	Vaud
Bogis-Bossey	Vaud
Bois-d'Amont	Fribourg
Bolken	Solothurn
Bolligen	Bern
Boltigen	Bern
Bonaduz	Graubünden
Boncourt	Jura
Bönigen	Bern
Boningen	Solothurn
Boniswil	Aargau
Bonstetten	Zürich
Bonvillars	Vaud
Boppelsen	Zürich
Borex	Vaud
Bosco/Gurin	Ticino
Bösingen	Fribourg
Bossonnens	Fribourg
Boswil	Aargau
Bottens	Vaud
Bottenwil	Aargau
Botterens	Fribourg
Bottighofen	Thurgau
Bottmingen	Basel-Landschaft
Böttstein	Aargau
Boudry	Neuchâtel
Bougy-Villars	Vaud
Boulens	Vaud
Bourg-en-Lavaux	Vaud
Bourg-Saint-Pierre	Valais
Bournens	Vaud
Bourrignon	Jura
Boussens	Vaud
Bovernier	Valais
Bowil	Bern
Bözberg	Aargau
Böztal	Aargau
Braunau	Thurgau
Bregaglia	Graubünden
Breggia	Ticino
Breil/Brigels	Graubünden
Breitenbach	Solothurn
Bremblens	Vaud
Bremgarten	Aargau
Bremgarten bei Bern	Bern
Brenzikofen	Bern
Bretigny-sur-Morrens	Vaud
Bretonnières	Vaud
Bretzwil	Basel-Landschaft
Brienz	Bern
Brienzwiler	Bern
Brig-Glis	Valais
Brione sopra Minusio	Ticino
Brislach	Basel-Landschaft
Brissago	Ticino
Brittnau	Aargau
Broc	Fribourg
Brot-Plamboz	Neuchâtel
Brugg	Aargau
Brügg	Bern
Brunegg	Aargau
Brünisried	Fribourg
Brusino Arsizio	Ticino
Brusio	Graubünden
Brüttelen	Bern
Brütten	Zürich
Bubendorf	Basel-Landschaft
Bubikon	Zürich
Buch	Schaffhausen
Buch am Irchel	Zürich
Buchegg	Solothurn
Buchberg	Schaffhausen
Buchholterberg	Bern
Buchillon	Vaud
Buchrain	Lucerne
Buchs	Aargau
Buchs	St. Gallen
Buchs	Zürich
Buckten	Basel-Landschaft
Büetigen	Bern
Bühl bei Aarberg	Bern
Bühler	Appenzell Ausserrhoden
Bülach	Zürich
Bulle	Fribourg
Bullet	Vaud
Bünzen	Aargau
Buochs	Nidwalden
Bürchen	Valais
Bure	Jura
Büren	Solothurn
Büren an der Aare	Bern
Burg im Leimental	Basel-Landschaft
Burgdorf	Bern
Burgistein	Bern
Bürglen	Thurgau
Bürglen	Uri
Büron	Lucerne
Bursinel	Vaud
Bursins	Vaud
Burtigny	Vaud
Buseno	Graubünden
Büsserach	Solothurn
Bussigny	Vaud
Bussnang	Thurgau
Busswil bei Melchnau	Bern
Bussy-sur-Moudon	Vaud
Bütschwil-Ganterschwil	St. Gallen
Büttenhardt	Schaffhausen
Büttikon	Aargau
Buttisholz	Lucerne
Buttwil	Aargau
Buus	Basel-Landschaft
Cademario	Ticino
Cadempino	Ticino
Cadenazzo	Ticino
Calanca	Graubünden
Cama	Graubünden
Campo	Ticino
Canobbio	Ticino
Capriasca	Ticino
Carouge	Geneva
Cartigny	Geneva
Caslano	Ticino
Castaneda	Graubünden
Castel San Pietro	Ticino
Cazis	Graubünden
Celerina/Schlarigna	Graubünden
Céligny	Geneva
Centovalli	Ticino
Cerentino	Ticino
Cevio	Ticino
Chalais	Valais
Cham	Zug
Chamblon	Vaud
Chamoson	Valais
Champagne	Vaud
Champéry	Valais
Champoz	Bern
Champtauroz	Vaud
Champvent	Vaud
Chancy	Geneva
Chardonne	Vaud
Château-d'Oex	Vaud
Châtel-Saint-Denis	Fribourg
Châtel-sur-Montsalvens	Fribourg
Châtillon	Fribourg
Châtillon	Jura
Châtonnaye	Fribourg
Chavannes-de-Bogis	Vaud
Chavannes-des-Bois	Vaud
Chavannes-le-Chêne	Vaud
Chavannes-le-Veyron	Vaud
Chavannes-près-Renens	Vaud
Chavannes-sur-Moudon	Vaud
Chavornay	Vaud
Chêne-Bougeries	Geneva
Chêne-Bourg	Geneva
Chêne-Pâquier	Vaud
Chénens	Fribourg
Cheseaux-Noréaz	Vaud
Cheseaux-sur-Lausanne	Vaud
Chéserex	Vaud
Chessel	Vaud
Chevilly	Vaud
Chevroux	Vaud
Chexbres	Vaud
Cheyres-Châbles	Fribourg
Chiasso	Ticino
Chigny	Vaud
Chippis	Valais
Choulex	Geneva
Chur	Graubünden
Churwalden	Graubünden
Clarmont	Vaud
Clos du Doubs	Jura
Coeuve	Jura
Coinsins	Vaud
Coldrerio	Ticino
Collex-Bossy	Geneva
Collina d'Oro	Ticino
Collombey-Muraz	Valais
Collonge-Bellerive	Geneva
Collonges	Valais
Cologny	Geneva
Comano	Ticino
Commugny	Vaud
Concise	Vaud
Confignon	Geneva
Conters im Prättigau	Graubünden
Conthey	Valais
Coppet	Vaud
Corbeyrier	Vaud
Corbières	Fribourg
Corcelles	Bern
Corcelles-le-Jorat	Vaud
Corcelles-près-Concise	Vaud
Corcelles-près-Payerne	Vaud
Corgémont	Bern
Corminboeuf	Fribourg
Cormoret	Bern
Cornaux	Neuchâtel
Cornol	Jura
Corseaux	Vaud
Corsier	Geneva
Corsier-sur-Vevey	Vaud
Cortaillod	Neuchâtel
Cortébert	Bern
Cossonay	Vaud
Cottens	Fribourg
Courchapoix	Jura
Courchavon	Jura
Courgenay	Jura
Courgevaux	Fribourg
Courrendlin	Jura
Courroux	Jura
Court	Bern
Courtedoux	Jura
Courtelary	Bern
Courtepin	Fribourg
Courtételle	Jura
Crans	Vaud
Crans-Montana	Valais
Crassier	Vaud
Crémines	Bern
Cressier	Fribourg
Cressier	Neuchâtel
Crésuz	Fribourg
Crissier	Vaud
Cronay	Vaud
Croy	Vaud
Cuarnens	Vaud
Cuarny	Vaud
Cudrefin	Vaud
Cugnasco-Gerra	Ticino
Cugy	Fribourg
Cugy	Vaud
Cureglia	Ticino
Curtilles	Vaud
Dachsen	Zürich
Dägerlen	Zürich
Dagmersellen	Lucerne
Daillens	Vaud
Dallenwil	Nidwalden
Dällikon	Zürich
Dalpe	Ticino
Damphreux-Lugnez	Jura
Däniken	Solothurn
Dänikon	Zürich
Dardagny	Geneva
Därligen	Bern
Därstetten	Bern
Dättlikon	Zürich
Davos	Graubünden
Degersheim	St. Gallen
Deisswil bei Münchenbuchsee	Bern
Deitingen	Solothurn
Delémont	Jura
Delley-Portalban	Fribourg
Démoret	Vaud
Denens	Vaud
Denges	Vaud
Densbüren	Aargau
Derendingen	Solothurn
Develier	Jura
Diegten	Basel-Landschaft
Dielsdorf	Zürich
Diemtigen	Bern
Diepflingen	Basel-Landschaft
Diepoldsau	St. Gallen
Dierikon	Lucerne
Diessbach bei Büren	Bern
Diessenhofen	Thurgau
Dietikon	Zürich
Dietlikon	Zürich
Dietwil	Aargau
Dinhard	Zürich
Dintikon	Aargau
Disentis/Mustér	Graubünden
Dittingen	Basel-Landschaft
Dizy	Vaud
Domat/Ems	Graubünden
Domleschg	Graubünden
Dompierre	Vaud
Donneloye	Vaud
Doppleschwand	Lucerne
Dorénaz	Valais
Dorf	Zürich
Dörflingen	Schaffhausen
Dornach	Solothurn
Dottikon	Aargau
Döttingen	Aargau
Dotzigen	Bern
Dozwil	Thurgau
Drei Höfe	Solothurn
Dübendorf	Zürich
Düdingen	Fribourg
Duggingen	Basel-Landschaft
Duillier	Vaud
Dulliken	Solothurn
Dully	Vaud
Dürnten	Zürich
Dürrenäsch	Aargau
Dürrenroth	Bern
Ebikon	Lucerne
Ebnat-Kappel	St. Gallen
Échallens	Vaud
Echandens	Vaud
Echarlens	Fribourg
Echichens	Vaud
Eclépens	Vaud
Écublens	Vaud
Ederswiler	Jura
Egerkingen	Solothurn
Egg	Zürich
Eggenwil	Aargau
Eggerberg	Valais
Eggersriet	St. Gallen
Eggiwil	Bern
Eglisau	Zürich
Egliswil	Aargau
Egnach	Thurgau
Egolzwil	Lucerne
Ehrendingen	Aargau
Eich	Lucerne
Eichberg	St. Gallen
Eiken	Aargau
Einsiedeln	Schwyz
Eischoll	Valais
Eisten	Valais
Elgg	Zürich
Ellikon an der Thur	Zürich
Elsau	Zürich
Embd	Valais
Embrach	Zürich
Emmen	Lucerne
Emmetten	Nidwalden
Endingen	Aargau
Engelberg	Obwalden
Ennetbaden	Aargau
Ennetbürgen	Nidwalden
Ennetmoos	Nidwalden
Entlebuch	Lucerne
Epalinges	Vaud
Épendes	Vaud
Eppenberg-Wöschnau	Solothurn
Epsach	Bern
Eptingen	Basel-Landschaft
Ergisch	Valais
Eriswil	Bern
Eriz	Bern
Erlach	Bern
Erlen	Thurgau
Erlenbach	Zürich
Erlenbach im Simmental	Bern
Erlinsbach	Aargau
Erlinsbach	Solothurn
Ermatingen	Thurgau
Ermensee	Lucerne
Ernen	Valais
Erschwil	Solothurn
Ersigen	Bern
Erstfeld	Uri
Eschenbach	Lucerne
Eschenbach	St. Gallen
Eschenz	Thurgau
Eschert	Bern
Eschlikon	Thurgau
Escholzmatt-Marbach	Lucerne
Essertines-sur-Rolle	Vaud
Essertines-sur-Yverdon	Vaud
Estavayer	Fribourg
Etagnières	Vaud
Etoy	Vaud
Ettingen	Basel-Landschaft
Ettiswil	Lucerne
Etziken	Solothurn
Evilard	Bern
Evionnaz	Valais
Evolène	Valais
Eysins	Vaud
Fahrni	Bern
Fahrwangen	Aargau
Fahy	Jura
Faido	Ticino
Falera	Graubünden
Fällanden	Zürich
Faoug	Vaud
Farnern	Bern
Féchy	Vaud
Fehraltorf	Zürich
Fehren	Solothurn
Felben-Wellhausen	Thurgau
Feldbrunnen-St. Niklaus	Solothurn
Felsberg	Graubünden
Ferden	Valais
Ferenbalm	Bern
Ferpicloz	Fribourg
Ferrera	Graubünden
Ferreyres	Vaud
Fétigny-Ménières	Fribourg
Feuerthalen	Zürich
Feusisberg	Schwyz
Fey	Vaud
Fideris	Graubünden
Fiesch	Valais
Fieschertal	Valais
Fiez	Vaud
Finhaut	Valais
Finsterhennen	Bern
Fischbach	Lucerne
Fischbach-Göslikon	Aargau
Fischenthal	Zürich
Fischingen	Thurgau
Fisibach	Aargau
Fislisbach	Aargau
Flaach	Zürich
Fläsch	Graubünden
Flawil	St. Gallen
Flerden	Graubünden
Flims	Graubünden
Flüelen	Uri
Flühli	Lucerne
Flumenthal	Solothurn
Flums	St. Gallen
Flurlingen	Zürich
Fontaines-sur-Grandson	Vaud
Fontenais	Jura
Forel	Vaud
Forst-Längenbühl	Bern
Founex	Vaud
Fräschels	Fribourg
Fraubrunnen	Bern
Frauenfeld	Thurgau
Frauenkappelen	Bern
Freienbach	Schwyz
Freienstein-Teufen	Zürich
Freienwil	Aargau
Freimettigen	Bern
Frenkendorf	Basel-Landschaft
Fribourg	Fribourg
Frick	Aargau
Froideville	Vaud
Frutigen	Bern
Fulenbach	Solothurn
Full-Reuenthal	Aargau
Füllinsdorf	Basel-Landschaft
Fully	Valais
Furna	Graubünden
Fürstenau	Graubünden
Gächlingen	Schaffhausen
Gachnang	Thurgau
Gais	Appenzell Ausserrhoden
Gaiserwald	St. Gallen
Galgenen	Schwyz
Gals	Bern
Gambarogno	Ticino
Gampel-Bratsch	Valais
Gampelen	Bern
Gams	St. Gallen
Gansingen	Aargau
Gebenstorf	Aargau
Gelterkinden	Basel-Landschaft
Geltwil	Aargau
Gempen	Solothurn
Geneva	Geneva
Genolier	Vaud
Genthod	Geneva
Gerlafingen	Solothurn
Geroldswil	Zürich
Gersau	Schwyz
Gerzensee	Bern
Geuensee	Lucerne
Gibloux	Fribourg
Giebenach	Basel-Landschaft
Giez	Vaud
Giffers	Fribourg
Gilly	Vaud
Gimel	Vaud
Gingins	Vaud
Giornico	Ticino
Gipf-Oberfrick	Aargau
Gisikon	Lucerne
Giswil	Obwalden
Givisiez	Fribourg
Givrins	Vaud
Gland	Vaud
Glarus	Glarus
Glarus Nord	Glarus
Glarus Süd	Glarus
Glattfelden	Zürich
Gletterens	Fribourg
Goldach	St. Gallen
Gollion	Vaud
Gommiswald	St. Gallen
Goms	Valais
Gondiswil	Bern
Gonten	Appenzell Innerrhoden
Gontenschwil	Aargau
Gordola	Ticino
Göschenen	Uri
Gossau	St. Gallen
Gossau	Zürich
Gottlieben	Thurgau
Goumoëns	Vaud
Graben	Bern
Grabs	St. Gallen
Grächen	Valais
Grancia	Ticino
Grancy	Vaud
Grandcour	Vaud
Grandevent	Vaud
Grandfontaine	Jura
Grandson	Vaud
Grandval	Bern
Grandvillard	Fribourg
Granges (Veveyse)	Fribourg
Granges-Paccot	Fribourg
Grangettes	Fribourg
Gränichen	Aargau
Gravesano	Ticino
Greifensee	Zürich
Grellingen	Basel-Landschaft
Grenchen	Solothurn
Greng	Fribourg
Grengiols	Valais
Grens	Vaud
Greppen	Lucerne
Gretzenbach	Solothurn
Grimisuat	Valais
Grindel	Solothurn
Grindelwald	Bern
Grolley-Ponthaux	Fribourg
Grône	Valais
Grono	Graubünden
Grossaffoltern	Bern
Grossdietwil	Lucerne
Grosshöchstetten	Bern
Grosswangen	Lucerne
Grub	Appenzell Ausserrhoden
Grüningen	Zürich
Grüsch	Graubünden
Gruyères	Fribourg
Gryon	Vaud
Gsteig bei Gstaad	Bern
Gsteigwiler	Bern
Guggisberg	Bern
Gündlischwand	Bern
Günsberg	Solothurn
Gunzgen	Solothurn
Gurbrü	Bern
Gurmels	Fribourg
Gurtnellen	Uri
Gurzelen	Bern
Guttannen	Bern
Guttet-Feschel	Valais
Güttingen	Thurgau
Gy	Geneva
Habkern	Bern
Habsburg	Aargau
Häfelfingen	Basel-Landschaft
Hagenbuch	Zürich
Hägendorf	Solothurn
Häggenschwil	St. Gallen
Hägglingen	Aargau
Hagneck	Bern
Hallau	Schaffhausen
Hallwil	Aargau
Härkingen	Solothurn
Hasle	Lucerne
Hasle bei Burgdorf	Bern
Hasliberg	Bern
Hauenstein-Ifenthal	Solothurn
Hauptwil-Gottshaus	Thurgau
Hausen	Aargau
Hausen am Albis	Zürich
Haut-Intyamon	Fribourg
Haute-Ajoie	Jura
Haute-Sorne	Jura
Hautemorges	Vaud
Hauterive	Fribourg
Hauteville	Fribourg
Häutligen	Bern
Hedingen	Zürich
Hefenhofen	Thurgau
Heiden	Appenzell Ausserrhoden
Heiligenschwendi	Bern
Heimberg	Bern
Heimenhausen	Bern
Heimiswil	Bern
Heitenried	Fribourg
Hellikon	Aargau
Hellsau	Bern
Hemishofen	Schaffhausen
Hemmiken	Basel-Landschaft
Hendschiken	Aargau
Henggart	Zürich
Henniez	Vaud
Herbetswil	Solothurn
Herbligen	Bern
Herdern	Thurgau
Hérémence	Valais
Hergiswil	Nidwalden
Hergiswil bei Willisau	Lucerne
Herisau	Appenzell Ausserrhoden
Hermance	Geneva
Hermenches	Vaud
Hermrigen	Bern
Herrliberg	Zürich
Hersberg	Basel-Landschaft
Herznach-Ueken	Aargau
Herzogenbuchsee	Bern
Hettlingen	Zürich
Hildisrieden	Lucerne
Hilterfingen	Bern
Himmelried	Solothurn
Hindelbank	Bern
Hinwil	Zürich
Hirschthal	Aargau
Hittnau	Zürich
Hitzkirch	Lucerne
Hochdorf	Lucerne
Hochfelden	Zürich
Höchstetten	Bern
Hochwald	Solothurn
Hofstetten bei Brienz	Bern
Hofstetten-Flüh	Solothurn
Hohenrain	Lucerne
Hohentannen	Thurgau
Holderbank	Aargau
Holderbank	Solothurn
Hölstein	Basel-Landschaft
Holziken	Aargau
Homberg	Bern
Hombrechtikon	Zürich
Homburg	Thurgau
Horgen	Zürich
Höri	Zürich
Horn	Thurgau
Horrenbach-Buchen	Bern
Horriwil	Solothurn
Horw	Lucerne
Hospental	Uri
Hubersdorf	Solothurn
Hundwil	Appenzell Ausserrhoden
Hünenberg	Zug
Hüniken	Solothurn
Hüntwangen	Zürich
Hunzenschwil	Aargau
Hüttikon	Zürich
Hüttlingen	Thurgau
Huttwil	Bern
Hüttwilen	Thurgau
Icogne	Valais
Iffwil	Bern
Ilanz/Glion	Graubünden
Illgau	Schwyz
Illnau-Effretikon	Zürich
Inden	Valais
Ingenbohl	Schwyz
Inkwil	Bern
Innerthal	Schwyz
Innertkirchen	Bern
Ins	Bern
Interlaken	Bern
Inwil	Lucerne
Ipsach	Bern
Iseltwald	Bern
Isenthal	Uri
Isérables	Valais
Islisberg	Aargau
Isone	Ticino
Itingen	Basel-Landschaft
Ittigen	Bern
Jaberg	Bern
Jaun	Fribourg
Jegenstorf	Bern
Jenaz	Graubünden
Jenins	Graubünden
Jens	Bern
Jonen	Aargau
Jongny	Vaud
Jonschwil	St. Gallen
Jouxtens-Mézery	Vaud
Jorat-Menthue	Vaud
Jorat-Mézières	Vaud
Juriens	Vaud
Jussy	Geneva
Kaiseraugst	Aargau
Kaisten	Aargau
Kallern	Aargau
Kallnach	Bern
Kaltbrunn	St. Gallen
Kammersrohr	Solothurn
Kandergrund	Bern
Kandersteg	Bern
Känerkinden	Basel-Landschaft
Kappel	Solothurn
Kappel am Albis	Zürich
Kappelen	Bern
Kaufdorf	Bern
Kehrsatz	Bern
Kemmental	Thurgau
Kernenried	Bern
Kerns	Obwalden
Kerzers	Fribourg
Kesswil	Thurgau
Kestenholz	Solothurn
Kienberg	Solothurn
Kiesen	Bern
Kilchberg	Basel-Landschaft
Kilchberg	Zürich
Killwangen	Aargau
Kippel	Valais
Kirchberg	Bern
Kirchberg	St. Gallen
Kirchdorf	Bern
Kirchleerau	Aargau
Kirchlindach	Bern
Kleinandelfingen	Zürich
Kleinbösingen	Fribourg
Kleinlützel	Solothurn
Klingnau	Aargau
Klosters	Graubünden
Kloten	Zürich
Knonau	Zürich
Knutwil	Lucerne
Koblenz	Aargau
Kölliken	Aargau
Köniz	Bern
Konolfingen	Bern
Koppigen	Bern
Kradolf-Schönenberg	Thurgau
Krattigen	Bern
Krauchthal	Bern
Kreuzlingen	Thurgau
Kriechenwil	Bern
Kriegstetten	Solothurn
Kriens	Lucerne
Küblis	Graubünden
Künten	Aargau
Küsnacht	Zürich
Küssnacht	Schwyz
Küttigen	Aargau
L'Abbaye	Vaud
L'Abergement	Vaud
L'Isle	Vaud
La Baroche	Jura
La Brévine	Neuchâtel
La Brillaz	Fribourg
La Chaux	Vaud
La Chaux-de-Fonds	Neuchâtel
La Chaux-du-Milieu	Neuchâtel
La Côte-aux-Fées	Neuchâtel
La Ferrière	Bern
La Grande Béroche	Neuchâtel
La Neuveville	Bern
La Praz	Vaud
La Punt Chamues-ch	Graubünden
La Rippe	Vaud
La Roche	Fribourg
La Sagne	Neuchâtel
La Sarraz	Vaud
La Sonnaz	Fribourg
La Tour-de-Peilz	Vaud
La Verrerie	Fribourg
Laax	Graubünden
Lachen	Schwyz
Laconnex	Geneva
Lajoux	Jura
Lalden	Valais
Lamone	Ticino
Lampenberg	Basel-Landschaft
Lancy	Geneva
Landiswil	Bern
Landquart	Graubünden
Langenbruck	Basel-Landschaft
Langendorf	Solothurn
Langenthal	Bern
Langnau am Albis	Zürich
Langnau im Emmental	Bern
Langrickenbach	Thurgau
Lantsch/Lenz	Graubünden
Laténa	Neuchâtel
Lauenen	Bern
Lauerz	Schwyz
Läufelfingen	Basel-Landschaft
Laufen	Basel-Landschaft
Laufen-Uhwiesen	Zürich
Laufenburg	Aargau
Laupen	Bern
Laupersdorf	Solothurn
Lauperswil	Bern
Lausanne	Vaud
Lausen	Basel-Landschaft
Lauterbrunnen	Bern
Lauwil	Basel-Landschaft
Lavertezzo	Ticino
Lavey-Morcles	Vaud
Lavigny	Vaud
Lavizzara	Ticino
Lax	Valais
Le Bémont	Jura
Le Cerneux-Péquignot	Neuchâtel
Le Châtelard	Fribourg
Le Chenit	Vaud
Le Flon	Fribourg
Le Grand-Saconnex	Geneva
Le Landeron	Neuchâtel
Le Lieu	Vaud
Le Locle	Neuchâtel
Le Mont-sur-Lausanne	Vaud
Le Mouret	Fribourg
Le Noirmont	Jura
Le Pâquier	Fribourg
Le Vaud	Vaud
Leibstadt	Aargau
Leimbach	Aargau
Leissigen	Bern
Lema	Ticino
Lengnau	Aargau
Lengnau	Bern
Lengwil	Thurgau
Lenk im Simmental	Bern
Lens	Valais
Lenzburg	Aargau
Les Bois	Jura
Les Breuleux	Jura
Les Clées	Vaud
Les Enfers	Jura
Les Genevez	Jura
Les Montets	Fribourg
Les Planchettes	Neuchâtel
Les Ponts-de-Martel	Neuchâtel
Les Verrières	Neuchâtel
Leuggern	Aargau
Leuk	Valais
Leukerbad	Valais
Leutwil	Aargau
Leuzigen	Bern
Leysin	Vaud
Leytron	Valais
Lichtensteig	St. Gallen
Liddes	Valais
Liedertswil	Basel-Landschaft
Liesberg	Basel-Landschaft
Liestal	Basel-Landschaft
Ligerz	Bern
Lignerolle	Vaud
Lignières	Neuchâtel
Lindau	Zürich
Linden	Bern
Linescio	Ticino
Locarno	Ticino
Lohn	Schaffhausen
Lohn-Ammannsegg	Solothurn
Löhningen	Schaffhausen
Lommis	Thurgau
Lommiswil	Solothurn
Lonay	Vaud
Longirod	Vaud
Losone	Ticino
Lostallo	Graubünden
Lostorf	Solothurn
Lotzwil	Bern
Lovatens	Vaud
Loveresse	Bern
Lucens	Vaud
Lufingen	Zürich
Lugano	Ticino
Luins	Vaud
Lully	Fribourg
Lully	Vaud
Lumino	Ticino
Lumnezia	Graubünden
Lungern	Obwalden
Lupfig	Aargau
Lupsingen	Basel-Landschaft
Lüscherz	Bern
Lussery-Villars	Vaud
Lüsslingen-Nennigkofen	Solothurn
Lussy-sur-Morges	Vaud
Luterbach	Solothurn
Lüterkofen-Ichertswil	Solothurn
Luthern	Lucerne
Lütisburg	St. Gallen
Lutry	Vaud
Lütschental	Bern
Lützelflüh	Bern
Lutzenberg	Appenzell Ausserrhoden
Luzein	Graubünden
Lucerne	Lucerne
Lyss	Bern
Lyssach	Bern
Madiswil	Bern
Madulain	Graubünden
Magden	Aargau
Mägenwil	Aargau
Maggia	Ticino
Magliaso	Ticino
Maienfeld	Graubünden
Maisprach	Basel-Landschaft
Malans	Graubünden
Malters	Lucerne
Mammern	Thurgau
Mandach	Aargau
Männedorf	Zürich
Manno	Ticino
Maracon	Vaud
Marbach	St. Gallen
Marchissy	Vaud
Marly	Fribourg
Marsens	Fribourg
Märstetten	Thurgau
Marthalen	Zürich
Martigny	Valais
Martigny-Combe	Valais
Maschwanden	Zürich
Masein	Graubünden
Massagno	Ticino
Massongex	Valais
Massonnens	Fribourg
Mathod	Vaud
Matran	Fribourg
Matten bei Interlaken	Bern
Mattstetten	Bern
Matzendorf	Solothurn
Matzingen	Thurgau
Mauborget	Vaud
Mauensee	Lucerne
Maur	Zürich
Mauraz	Vaud
Medel (Lucmagn)	Graubünden
Meggen	Lucerne
Meienried	Bern
Meierskappel	Lucerne
Meikirch	Bern
Meilen	Zürich
Meinier	Geneva
Meinisberg	Bern
Meiringen	Bern
Meisterschwanden	Aargau
Melchnau	Bern
Melide	Ticino
Mellikon	Aargau
Mellingen	Aargau
Mels	St. Gallen
Meltingen	Solothurn
Mendrisio	Ticino
Menziken	Aargau
Menzingen	Zug
Menznau	Lucerne
Merenschwand	Aargau
Mergoscia	Ticino
Merishausen	Schaffhausen
Mervelier	Jura
Merzligen	Bern
Mesocco	Graubünden
Messen	Solothurn
Mettauertal	Aargau
Mettembert	Jura
Mettmenstetten	Zürich
Metzerlen-Mariastein	Solothurn
Mex	Vaud
Meyriez	Fribourg
Meyrin	Geneva
Mézières	Fribourg
Mezzovico-Vira	Ticino
Mies	Vaud
Milvignes	Neuchâtel
Minusio	Ticino
Mirchel	Bern
Misery-Courtion	Fribourg
Missy	Vaud
Möhlin	Aargau
Moiry	Vaud
Mollens	Vaud
Molondin	Vaud
Mönchaltorf	Zürich
Mont-la-Ville	Vaud
Mont-Noble	Valais
Mont-sur-Rolle	Vaud
Mont-Tramelan	Bern
Mont-Vully	Fribourg
Montagny	Fribourg
Montagny-près-Yverdon	Vaud
Montanaire	Vaud
Montcherand	Vaud
Monteceneri	Ticino
Montfaucon	Jura
Mönthal	Aargau
Monthey	Valais
Montilliez	Vaud
Montpreveyres	Vaud
Montreux	Vaud
Montricher	Vaud
Moosleerau	Aargau
Moosseedorf	Bern
Morbio Inferiore	Ticino
Morcote	Ticino
Mörel-Filet	Valais
Morges	Vaud
Mörigen	Bern
Möriken-Wildegg	Aargau
Morlon	Fribourg
Morrens	Vaud
Morschach	Schwyz
Mörschwil	St. Gallen
Mosnang	St. Gallen
Moudon	Vaud
Moutier	Jura
Movelier	Jura
Muhen	Aargau
Mühlau	Aargau
Mühleberg	Bern
Müllheim	Thurgau
Mülligen	Aargau
Mümliswil-Ramiswil	Solothurn
Mumpf	Aargau
Münchenbuchsee	Bern
Münchenstein	Basel-Landschaft
Münchenwiler	Bern
Münchwilen	Aargau
Münchwilen	Thurgau
Münsingen	Bern
Münsterlingen	Thurgau
Muntelier	Fribourg
Müntschemier	Bern
Muntogna da Schons	Graubünden
Muolen	St. Gallen
Muotathal	Schwyz
Muralto	Ticino
Murgenthal	Aargau
Muri	Aargau
Muri bei Bern	Bern
Muriaux	Jura
Murten	Fribourg
Mutrux	Vaud
Muttenz	Basel-Landschaft
Muzzano	Ticino
Naters	Valais
Nebikon	Lucerne
Neckertal	St. Gallen
Neerach	Zürich
Neftenbach	Zürich
Neggio	Ticino
Nendaz	Valais
Nenzlingen	Basel-Landschaft
Nesslau	St. Gallen
Neuchâtel	Neuchâtel
Neuendorf	Solothurn
Neuenegg	Bern
Neuenhof	Aargau
Neuenkirch	Lucerne
Neuhausen am Rheinfall	Schaffhausen
Neuheim	Zug
Neunforn	Thurgau
Neunkirch	Schaffhausen
Neyruz	Fribourg
Nidau	Bern
Niederbipp	Bern
Niederbuchsiten	Solothurn
Niederbüren	St. Gallen
Niederdorf	Basel-Landschaft
Niedergesteln	Valais
Niederglatt	Zürich
Niedergösgen	Solothurn
Niederhasli	Zürich
Niederhelfenschwil	St. Gallen
Niederhünigen	Bern
Niederlenz	Aargau
Niedermuhlern	Bern
Niederönz	Bern
Niederried bei Interlaken	Bern
Niederrohrdorf	Aargau
Niederweningen	Zürich
Niederwil	Aargau
Noble-Contrée	Valais
Nods	Bern
Nottwil	Lucerne
Novalles	Vaud
Novazzano	Ticino
Noville	Vaud
Nuglar-St. Pantaleon	Solothurn
Nunningen	Solothurn
Nürensdorf	Zürich
Nusshof	Basel-Landschaft
Nuvilly	Fribourg
Nyon	Vaud
Oberägeri	Zug
Oberbalm	Bern
Oberbipp	Bern
Oberbuchsiten	Solothurn
Oberbüren	St. Gallen
Oberburg	Bern
Oberdiessbach	Bern
Oberdorf	Basel-Landschaft
Oberdorf	Nidwalden
Oberdorf	Solothurn
Oberegg	Appenzell Innerrhoden
Oberembrach	Zürich
Oberems	Valais
Oberengstringen	Zürich
Oberentfelden	Aargau
Obergerlafingen	Solothurn
Oberglatt	Zürich
Obergoms	Valais
Obergösgen	Solothurn
Oberhallau	Schaffhausen
Oberhof	Aargau
Oberhofen am Thunersee	Bern
Oberhünigen	Bern
Oberiberg	Schwyz
Oberkirch	Lucerne
Oberkulm	Aargau
Oberlangenegg	Bern
Oberlunkhofen	Aargau
Obermumpf	Aargau
Oberried am Brienzersee	Bern
Oberrieden	Zürich
Oberriet	St. Gallen
Oberrohrdorf	Aargau
Oberrüti	Aargau
Obersaxen Mundaun	Graubünden
Obersiggenthal	Aargau
Oberthal	Bern
Oberuzwil	St. Gallen
Oberweningen	Zürich
Oberwil	Basel-Landschaft
Oberwil bei Büren	Bern
Oberwil im Simmental	Bern
Oberwil-Lieli	Aargau
Obfelden	Zürich
Ochlenberg	Bern
Oensingen	Solothurn
Oeschenbach	Bern
Oeschgen	Aargau
Oetwil am See	Zürich
Oetwil an der Limmat	Zürich
Oftringen	Aargau
Ogens	Vaud
Ollon	Vaud
Olsberg	Aargau
Olten	Solothurn
Oltingen	Basel-Landschaft
Onex	Geneva
Onnens	Vaud
Onsernone	Ticino
Opfikon	Zürich
Oppens	Vaud
Oppligen	Bern
Orbe	Vaud
Orges	Vaud
Origlio	Ticino
Ormalingen	Basel-Landschaft
Ormont-Dessous	Vaud
Ormont-Dessus	Vaud
Orny	Vaud
Oron	Vaud
Orpund	Bern
Orselina	Ticino
Orsières	Valais
Orvin	Bern
Orzens	Vaud
Ossingen	Zürich
Ostermundigen	Bern
Otelfingen	Zürich
Othmarsingen	Aargau
Ottenbach	Zürich
Oulens-sous-Échallens	Vaud
Pailly	Vaud
Paradiso	Ticino
Paudex	Vaud
Payerne	Vaud
Penthalaz	Vaud
Penthaz	Vaud
Penthéréaz	Vaud
Perly-Certoux	Geneva
Perrefitte	Bern
Perroy	Vaud
Personico	Ticino
Péry-La Heutte	Bern
Petit-Val	Bern
Pfäfers	St. Gallen
Pfäffikon	Zürich
Pfaffnau	Lucerne
Pfeffingen	Basel-Landschaft
Pfungen	Zürich
Pfyn	Thurgau
Pierrafortscha	Fribourg
Pieterlen	Bern
Plaffeien	Fribourg
Plan-les-Ouates	Geneva
Plasselb	Fribourg
Plateau de Diesse	Bern
Pleigne	Jura
Pohlern	Bern
Poliez-Pittet	Vaud
Pollegio	Ticino
Pompaples	Vaud
Pomy	Vaud
Pont-en-Ogoz	Fribourg
Pont-la-Ville	Fribourg
Ponte Capriasca	Ticino
Pontresina	Graubünden
Porrentruy	Jura
Port	Bern
Port-Valais	Valais
Porza	Ticino
Poschiavo	Graubünden
Prangins	Vaud
Pratteln	Basel-Landschaft
Pregny-Chambésy	Geneva
Premier	Vaud
Presinge	Geneva
Préverenges	Vaud
Prévondavaux	Fribourg
Prévonloup	Vaud
Prez	Fribourg
Prilly	Vaud
Provence	Vaud
Puidoux	Vaud
Pully	Vaud
Puplinge	Geneva
Pura	Ticino
Quarten	St. Gallen
Quinto	Ticino
Radelfingen	Bern
Rafz	Zürich
Rain	Lucerne
Ramlinsburg	Basel-Landschaft
Ramsen	Schaffhausen
Rances	Vaud
Randa	Valais
Raperswilen	Thurgau
Rapperswil	Bern
Rapperswil-Jona	St. Gallen
Raron	Valais
Realp	Uri
Rebévelier	Bern
Rebstein	St. Gallen
Recherswil	Solothurn
Rechthalten	Fribourg
Reconvilier	Bern
Regensberg	Zürich
Regensdorf	Zürich
Rehetobel	Appenzell Ausserrhoden
Reichenbach im Kandertal	Bern
Reichenburg	Schwyz
Reiden	Lucerne
Reigoldswil	Basel-Landschaft
Reinach	Aargau
Reinach	Basel-Landschaft
Reisiswil	Bern
Reitnau	Aargau
Remaufens	Fribourg
Remetschwil	Aargau
Remigen	Aargau
Renan	Bern
Renens	Vaud
Rennaz	Vaud
Reute	Appenzell Ausserrhoden
Reutigen	Bern
Rhäzüns	Graubünden
Rheinau	Zürich
Rheineck	St. Gallen
Rheinfelden	Aargau
Rheinwald	Graubünden
Riaz	Fribourg
Richterswil	Zürich
Rickenbach	Basel-Landschaft
Rickenbach	Lucerne
Rickenbach	Solothurn
Rickenbach	Thurgau
Rickenbach	Zürich
Riddes	Valais
Ried bei Kerzers	Fribourg
Ried-Brig	Valais
Riederalp	Valais
Riedholz	Solothurn
Riehen	Basel-Stadt
Riemenstalden	Schwyz
Rifferswil	Zürich
Riggisberg	Bern
Ringgenberg	Bern
Riniken	Aargau
Risch	Zug
Riva San Vitale	Ticino
Rivaz	Vaud
Riviera	Ticino
Roche	Vaud
Rochefort	Neuchâtel
Roches	Bern
Rodersdorf	Solothurn
Roggenburg	Basel-Landschaft
Roggliswil	Lucerne
Roggwil	Bern
Roggwil	Thurgau
Rohrbach	Bern
Rohrbachgraben	Bern
Rolle	Vaud
Romainmôtier-Envy	Vaud
Romanel-sur-Lausanne	Vaud
Romanel-sur-Morges	Vaud
Romanshorn	Thurgau
Römerswil	Lucerne
Romont	Bern
Romont	Fribourg
Romoos	Lucerne
Ronco sopra Ascona	Ticino
Rongellen	Graubünden
Root	Lucerne
Ropraz	Vaud
Rorbas	Zürich
Rorschach	St. Gallen
Rorschacherberg	St. Gallen
Röschenz	Basel-Landschaft
Rossa	Graubünden
Rossemaison	Jura
Rossenges	Vaud
Rossinière	Vaud
Röthenbach im Emmental	Bern
Rothenbrunnen	Graubünden
Rothenburg	Lucerne
Rothenfluh	Basel-Landschaft
Rothenthurm	Schwyz
Rothrist	Aargau
Rottenschwil	Aargau
Rougemont	Vaud
Roveredo	Graubünden
Rovray	Vaud
Rubigen	Bern
Rüderswil	Bern
Rüdlingen	Schaffhausen
Rudolfstetten-Friedlisberg	Aargau
Rüdtligen-Alchenflüh	Bern
Rue	Fribourg
Rüeggisberg	Bern
Rüegsau	Bern
Rueyres	Vaud
Rüfenach	Aargau
Rumendingen	Bern
Rumisberg	Bern
Rümlang	Zürich
Rümlingen	Basel-Landschaft
Rünenberg	Basel-Landschaft
Rupperswil	Aargau
Rüschegg	Bern
Rüschlikon	Zürich
Russikon	Zürich
Russin	Geneva
Ruswil	Lucerne
Rüthi	St. Gallen
Rüti	Zürich
Rüti bei Büren	Bern
Rüti bei Lyssach	Bern
Rütschelen	Bern
Rüttenen	Solothurn
S-chanf	Graubünden
Saanen	Bern
Saas-Almagell	Valais
Saas-Balen	Valais
Saas-Fee	Valais
Saas-Grund	Valais
Sachseln	Obwalden
Safenwil	Aargau
Safiental	Graubünden
Safnern	Bern
Sagogn	Graubünden
Saicourt	Bern
Saignelégier	Jura
Saillon	Valais
Saint-Aubin	Fribourg
Saint-Barthélemy	Vaud
Saint-Brais	Jura
Saint-Cergue	Vaud
Saint-George	Vaud
Saint-Gingolph	Valais
Saint-Imier	Bern
Saint-Léonard	Valais
Saint-Livres	Vaud
Saint-Martin	Fribourg
Saint-Martin	Valais
Saint-Maurice	Valais
Saint-Oyens	Vaud
Saint-Prex	Vaud
Saint-Saphorin	Vaud
Saint-Sulpice	Vaud
Sainte-Croix	Vaud
Salenstein	Thurgau
Sâles	Fribourg
Salgesch	Valais
Salmsach	Thurgau
Salvan	Valais
Samedan	Graubünden
Samnaun	Graubünden
San Vittore	Graubünden
Sant'Antonio	Ticino
Santa Maria in Calanca	Graubünden
Sargans	St. Gallen
Sarmenstorf	Aargau
Sarnen	Obwalden
Satigny	Geneva
Sattel	Schwyz
Saubraz	Vaud
Sauge	Bern
Saulcy	Jura
Saules	Bern
Savièse	Valais
Savigny	Vaud
Savosa	Ticino
Saxeten	Bern
Saxon	Valais
Schaffhausen	Schaffhausen
Schafisheim	Aargau
Schangnau	Bern
Schänis	St. Gallen
Scharans	Graubünden
Schattdorf	Uri
Schattenhalb	Bern
Schelten	Bern
Schenkon	Lucerne
Scheuren	Bern
Schiers	Graubünden
Schinznach	Aargau
Schlatt	Thurgau
Schlatt	Zürich
Schlatt-Haslen	Appenzell Innerrhoden
Schleinikon	Zürich
Schleitheim	Schaffhausen
Schlierbach	Lucerne
Schlieren	Zürich
Schlossrued	Aargau
Schluein	Graubünden
Schmerikon	St. Gallen
Schmiedrued	Aargau
Schmitten	Fribourg
Schmitten	Graubünden
Schneisingen	Aargau
Schnottwil	Solothurn
Schöfflisdorf	Zürich
Schöftland	Aargau
Schönenbuch	Basel-Landschaft
Schönengrund	Appenzell Ausserrhoden
Schönenwerd	Solothurn
Schongau	Lucerne
Schönholzerswilen	Thurgau
Schötz	Lucerne
Schübelbach	Schwyz
Schupfart	Aargau
Schüpfen	Bern
Schüpfheim	Lucerne
Schwaderloch	Aargau
Schwadernau	Bern
Schwanden bei Brienz	Bern
Schwarzenberg	Lucerne
Schwarzenburg	Bern
Schwarzhäusern	Bern
Schwellbrunn	Appenzell Ausserrhoden
Schwende-Rüte	Appenzell Innerrhoden
Schwerzenbach	Zürich
Schwyz	Schwyz
Scuol	Graubünden
Seeberg	Bern
Seedorf	Bern
Seedorf	Uri
Seegräben	Zürich
Seehof	Bern
Seelisberg	Uri
Seengen	Aargau
Seewen	Solothurn
Seewis im Prättigau	Graubünden
Seftigen	Bern
Seltisberg	Basel-Landschaft
Selzach	Solothurn
Sembrancher	Valais
Sempach	Lucerne
Semsales	Fribourg
Senarclens	Vaud
Sennwald	St. Gallen
Seon	Aargau
Sergey	Vaud
Serravalle	Ticino
Servion	Vaud
Seuzach	Zürich
Sévaz	Fribourg
Sevelen	St. Gallen
Siblingen	Schaffhausen
Sierre	Valais
Siglistorf	Aargau
Signau	Bern
Signy-Avenex	Vaud
Sigriswil	Bern
Silenen	Uri
Sils im Domleschg	Graubünden
Sils im Engadin/Segl	Graubünden
Silvaplana	Graubünden
Simplon	Valais
Sins	Aargau
Sion	Valais
Sirnach	Thurgau
Siselen	Bern
Sisikon	Uri
Sissach	Basel-Landschaft
Sisseln	Aargau
Siviriez	Fribourg
Soazza	Graubünden
Solothurn	Solothurn
Sommeri	Thurgau
Sonceboz-Sombeval	Bern
Sonvilier	Bern
Soral	Geneva
Sorengo	Ticino
Sorens	Fribourg
Sorvilier	Bern
Soubey	Jura
Soyhières	Jura
Speicher	Appenzell Ausserrhoden
Spiez	Bern
Spiringen	Uri
Spreitenbach	Aargau
St. Gallen	St. Gallen
St. Margrethen	St. Gallen
St. Moritz	Graubünden
St. Niklaus	Valais
St. Silvester	Fribourg
St. Stephan	Bern
St. Ursen	Fribourg
Stabio	Ticino
Stadel bei Niederglatt	Zürich
Stäfa	Zürich
Staffelbach	Aargau
Stalden	Valais
Staldenried	Valais
Stallikon	Zürich
Stammheim	Zürich
Stans	Nidwalden
Stansstad	Nidwalden
Starrkirch-Wil	Solothurn
Staufen	Aargau
Steckborn	Thurgau
Steffisburg	Bern
Steg-Hohtenn	Valais
Stein	Aargau
Stein	Appenzell Ausserrhoden
Stein am Rhein	Schaffhausen
Steinach	St. Gallen
Steinen	Schwyz
Steinerberg	Schwyz
Steinhausen	Zug
Steinmaur	Zürich
Stetten	Aargau
Stetten	Schaffhausen
Stettfurt	Thurgau
Stettlen	Bern
Stocken-Höfen	Bern
Strengelbach	Aargau
Studen	Bern
Stüsslingen	Solothurn
Subingen	Solothurn
Suchy	Vaud
Sufers	Graubünden
Suhr	Aargau
Sulgen	Thurgau
Sullens	Vaud
Sumiswald	Bern
Sumvitg	Graubünden
Surpierre	Fribourg
Sursee	Lucerne
Surses	Graubünden
Suscévaz	Vaud
Sutz-Lattrigen	Bern
Syens	Vaud
Tafers	Fribourg
Tägerig	Aargau
Tägerwilen	Thurgau
Tamins	Graubünden
Tannay	Vaud
Tartegnin	Vaud
Täsch	Valais
Täuffelen	Bern
Tavannes	Bern
Tecknau	Basel-Landschaft
Tegerfelden	Aargau
Tenero-Contra	Ticino
Tenniken	Basel-Landschaft
Tentlingen	Fribourg
Termen	Valais
Terre di Pedemonte	Ticino
Teufen	Appenzell Ausserrhoden
Teufenthal	Aargau
Teuffenthal	Bern
Tévenon	Vaud
Thal	St. Gallen
Thalheim	Aargau
Thalheim an der Thur	Zürich
Thalwil	Zürich
Thayngen	Schaffhausen
Therwil	Basel-Landschaft
Thierachern	Bern
Thônex	Geneva
Thörigen	Bern
Thun	Bern
Thundorf	Thurgau
Thunstetten	Bern
Thürnen	Basel-Landschaft
Thurnen	Bern
Thusis	Graubünden
Titterten	Basel-Landschaft
Tobel-Tägerschen	Thurgau
Toffen	Bern
Tolochenaz	Vaud
Törbel	Valais
Torny	Fribourg
Torricella-Taverne	Ticino
Trachselwald	Bern
Tramelan	Bern
Trasadingen	Schaffhausen
Treiten	Bern
Trélex	Vaud
Tresa	Ticino
Trey	Vaud
Treycovagnes	Vaud
Treytorrens	Vaud
Treyvaux	Fribourg
Triengen	Lucerne
Trient	Valais
Trimbach	Solothurn
Trimmis	Graubünden
Trin	Graubünden
Trogen	Appenzell Ausserrhoden
Troinex	Geneva
Troistorrents	Valais
Trub	Bern
Trubschachen	Bern
Trüllikon	Zürich
Trun	Graubünden
Truttikon	Zürich
Tschappina	Graubünden
Tschugg	Bern
Tübach	St. Gallen
Tuggen	Schwyz
Tujetsch	Graubünden
Turbenthal	Zürich
Turtmann-Unterems	Valais
Twann-Tüscherz	Bern
Udligenswil	Lucerne
Ueberstorf	Fribourg
Uebeschi	Bern
Uerkheim	Aargau
Uesslingen-Buch	Thurgau
Uetendorf	Bern
Uetikon am See	Zürich
Uezwil	Aargau
Ufhusen	Lucerne
Uitikon	Zürich
Unterägeri	Zug
Unterbäch	Valais
Untereggen	St. Gallen
Unterengstringen	Zürich
Unterentfelden	Aargau
Unteriberg	Schwyz
Unterkulm	Aargau
Unterlangenegg	Bern
Unterlunkhofen	Aargau
Unterramsern	Solothurn
Unterschächen	Uri
Unterseen	Bern
Untersiggenthal	Aargau
Untervaz	Graubünden
Urdorf	Zürich
Urmein	Graubünden
Urnäsch	Appenzell Ausserrhoden
Ursenbach	Bern
Ursins	Vaud
Ursy	Fribourg
Urtenen-Schönbühl	Bern
Uster	Zürich
Uttigen	Bern
Uttwil	Thurgau
Utzenstorf	Bern
Uznach	St. Gallen
Uzwil	St. Gallen
Vacallo	Ticino
Val de Bagnes	Valais
Val Mara	Ticino
Val Müstair	Graubünden
Val Terbi	Jura
Val-d'Illiez	Valais
Val-de-Charmey	Fribourg
Val-de-Ruz	Neuchâtel
Val-de-Travers	Neuchâtel
Valbirse	Bern
Valbroye	Vaud
Valeyres-sous-Montagny	Vaud
Valeyres-sous-Rances	Vaud
Valeyres-sous-Ursins	Vaud
Vallon	Fribourg
Vallorbe	Vaud
Vals	Graubünden
Valsot	Graubünden
Vandoeuvres	Geneva
Varen	Valais
Vaulion	Vaud
Vaulruz	Fribourg
Vaux-sur-Morges	Vaud
Vaz/Obervaz	Graubünden
Vechigen	Bern
Veltheim	Aargau
Vendlincourt	Jura
Vernate	Ticino
Vernayaz	Valais
Vernier	Geneva
Vérossaz	Valais
Versoix	Geneva
Verzasca	Ticino
Vétroz	Valais
Vevey	Vaud
Vex	Valais
Veyrier	Geneva
Veysonnaz	Valais
Veytaux	Vaud
Vezia	Ticino
Vich	Vaud
Vico Morcote	Ticino
Villars-Epeney	Vaud
Villars-le-Comte	Vaud
Villars-le-Terroir	Vaud
Villars-Sainte-Croix	Vaud
Villars-sous-Yens	Vaud
Villars-sur-Glâne	Fribourg
Villarsel-sur-Marly	Fribourg
Villarzel	Vaud
Villaz	Fribourg
Villeneuve	Vaud
Villeret	Bern
Villigen	Aargau
Villmergen	Aargau
Villorsonnens	Fribourg
Vilters-Wangs	St. Gallen
Vinelz	Bern
Vinzel	Vaud
Vionnaz	Valais
Visp	Valais
Visperterminen	Valais
Vitznau	Lucerne
Volken	Zürich
Volketswil	Zürich
Vordemwald	Aargau
Vorderthal	Schwyz
Vouvry	Valais
Vuadens	Fribourg
Vuarrens	Vaud
Vucherens	Vaud
Vufflens-la-Ville	Vaud
Vufflens-le-Château	Vaud
Vugelles-La Mothe	Vaud
Vuisternens-devant-Romont	Fribourg
Vuiteboeuf	Vaud
Vulliens	Vaud
Vullierens	Vaud
Vully-les-Lacs	Vaud
Wachseldorn	Bern
Wädenswil	Zürich
Wagenhausen	Thurgau
Wahlen	Basel-Landschaft
Walchwil	Zug
Wald	Appenzell Ausserrhoden
Wald	Bern
Wald	Zürich
Waldenburg	Basel-Landschaft
Wäldi	Thurgau
Waldkirch	St. Gallen
Waldstatt	Appenzell Ausserrhoden
Walenstadt	St. Gallen
Walkringen	Bern
Wallbach	Aargau
Wallisellen	Zürich
Walliswil bei Niederbipp	Bern
Walliswil bei Wangen	Bern
Walperswil	Bern
Waltenschwil	Aargau
Walterswil	Bern
Walterswil	Solothurn
Walzenhausen	Appenzell Ausserrhoden
Wangen	Schwyz
Wangen an der Aare	Bern
Wangen bei Olten	Solothurn
Wangen-Brüttisellen	Zürich
Wängi	Thurgau
Wartau	St. Gallen
Warth-Weiningen	Thurgau
Wassen	Uri
Wasterkingen	Zürich
Wattenwil	Bern
Wattwil	St. Gallen
Wauwil	Lucerne
Weesen	St. Gallen
Wegenstetten	Aargau
Weggis	Lucerne
Weiach	Zürich
Weinfelden	Thurgau
Weiningen	Zürich
Weisslingen	Zürich
Welschenrohr-Gänsbrunnen	Solothurn
Wengi	Bern
Wenslingen	Basel-Landschaft
Werthenstein	Lucerne
Wettingen	Aargau
Wettswil am Albis	Zürich
Wetzikon	Zürich
Wichtrach	Bern
Widen	Aargau
Widnau	St. Gallen
Wiedlisbach	Bern
Wiesendangen	Zürich
Wiggiswil	Bern
Wigoltingen	Thurgau
Wikon	Lucerne
Wil	St. Gallen
Wil	Zürich
Wila	Zürich
Wilchingen	Schaffhausen
Wildberg	Zürich
Wilderswil	Bern
Wildhaus-Alt St. Johann	St. Gallen
Wilen	Thurgau
Wiler	Valais
Wiler bei Utzenstorf	Bern
Wileroltigen	Bern
Wiliberg	Aargau
Willadingen	Bern
Willisau	Lucerne
Wimmis	Bern
Windisch	Aargau
Winkel	Zürich
Wintersingen	Basel-Landschaft
Winterthur	Zürich
Winznau	Solothurn
Wisen	Solothurn
Wittenbach	St. Gallen
Witterswil	Solothurn
Wittinsburg	Basel-Landschaft
Wittnau	Aargau
Wohlen	Aargau
Wohlen bei Bern	Bern
Wohlenschwil	Aargau
Wolfenschiessen	Nidwalden
Wolfhalden	Appenzell Ausserrhoden
Wölflinswil	Aargau
Wolfwil	Solothurn
Wolhusen	Lucerne
Wollerau	Schwyz
Worb	Bern
Worben	Bern
Wünnewil-Flamatt	Fribourg
Wuppenau	Thurgau
Würenlingen	Aargau
Würenlos	Aargau
Wynau	Bern
Wynigen	Bern
Wyssachen	Bern
Yens	Vaud
Yverdon-les-Bains	Vaud
Yvonand	Vaud
Yvorne	Vaud
Zäziwil	Bern
Zeglingen	Basel-Landschaft
Zeihen	Aargau
Zeiningen	Aargau
Zell	Lucerne
Zell	Zürich
Zeneggen	Valais
Zermatt	Valais
Zernez	Graubünden
Zetzwil	Aargau
Ziefen	Basel-Landschaft
Zielebach	Bern
Zihlschlacht-Sitterdorf	Thurgau
Zillis-Reischen	Graubünden
Zizers	Graubünden
Zofingen	Aargau
Zollikofen	Bern
Zollikon	Zürich
Zuchwil	Solothurn
Zufikon	Aargau
Zug	Zug
Zullwil	Solothurn
Zumikon	Zürich
Zunzgen	Basel-Landschaft
Zuoz	Graubünden
Zürich	Zürich
Zurzach	Aargau
Zuzgen	Aargau
Zuzwil	Bern
Zuzwil	St. Gallen
Zweisimmen	Bern
Zwingen	Basel-Landschaft
Zwischbergen	Valais
