= Sergey =

Sergey may refer to:

- Sergey (name), a Russian given name (including a list of people with the name)
- Sergey, Switzerland, a municipality in Switzerland
- Sergey (wasp), a genus in subfamily Doryctinae
