= Mathod Castle =

Castle in Mathod, Switzerland

- Château de Mathod
- Mathod in Switzerland
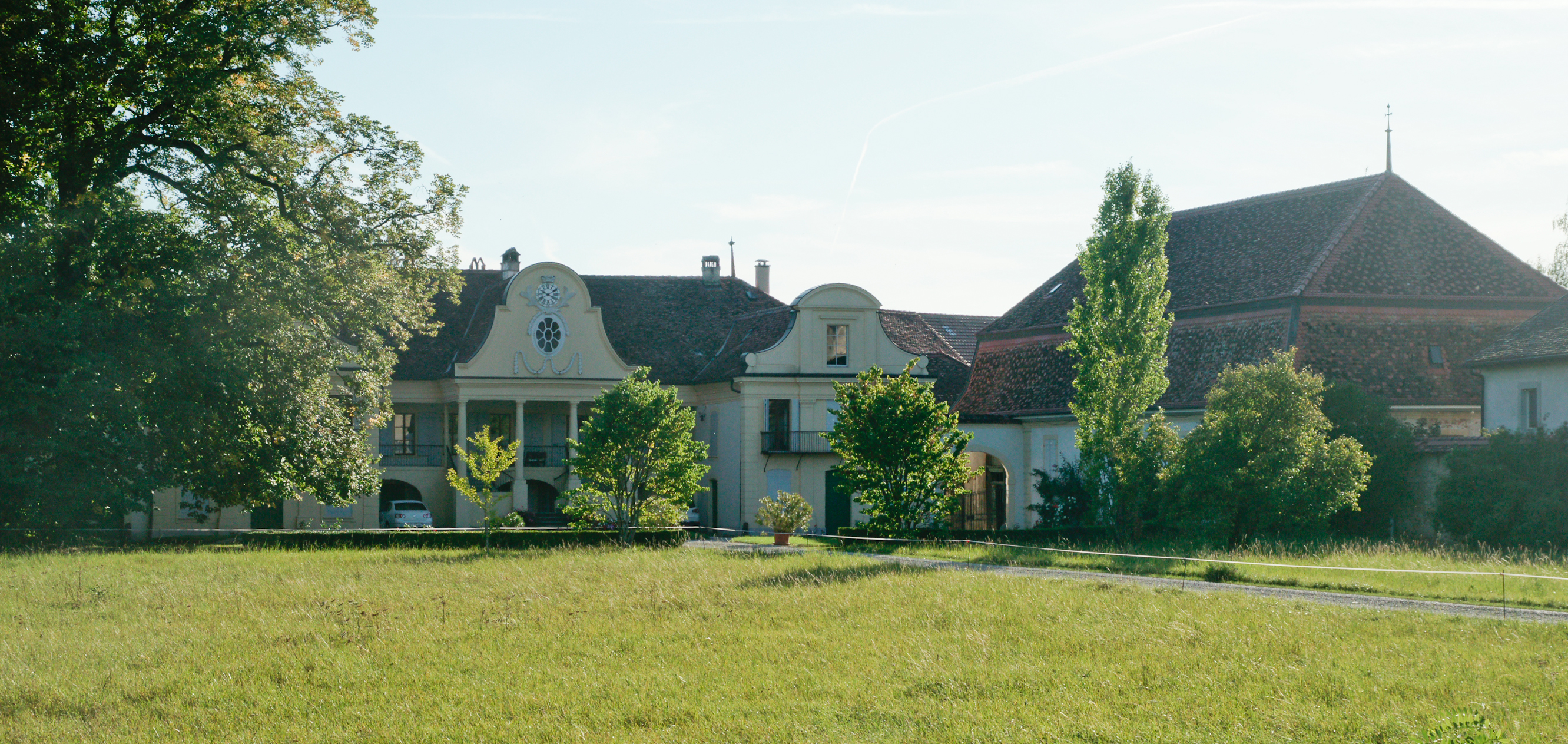
- Mathod Castle and outbuildings

Location
- Coordinates: 46°45′57″N 6°33′58″E

Site history
- Built: 16th century

Swiss Cultural Property of National Significance

Mathod Castle is a castle in the municipality of Mathod of the Canton of Vaud in Switzerland. It is a Swiss heritage site of national significance.

== See also ==
- List of castles in Switzerland
- Château
