= Rances, Switzerland =

Rances
- Municipality
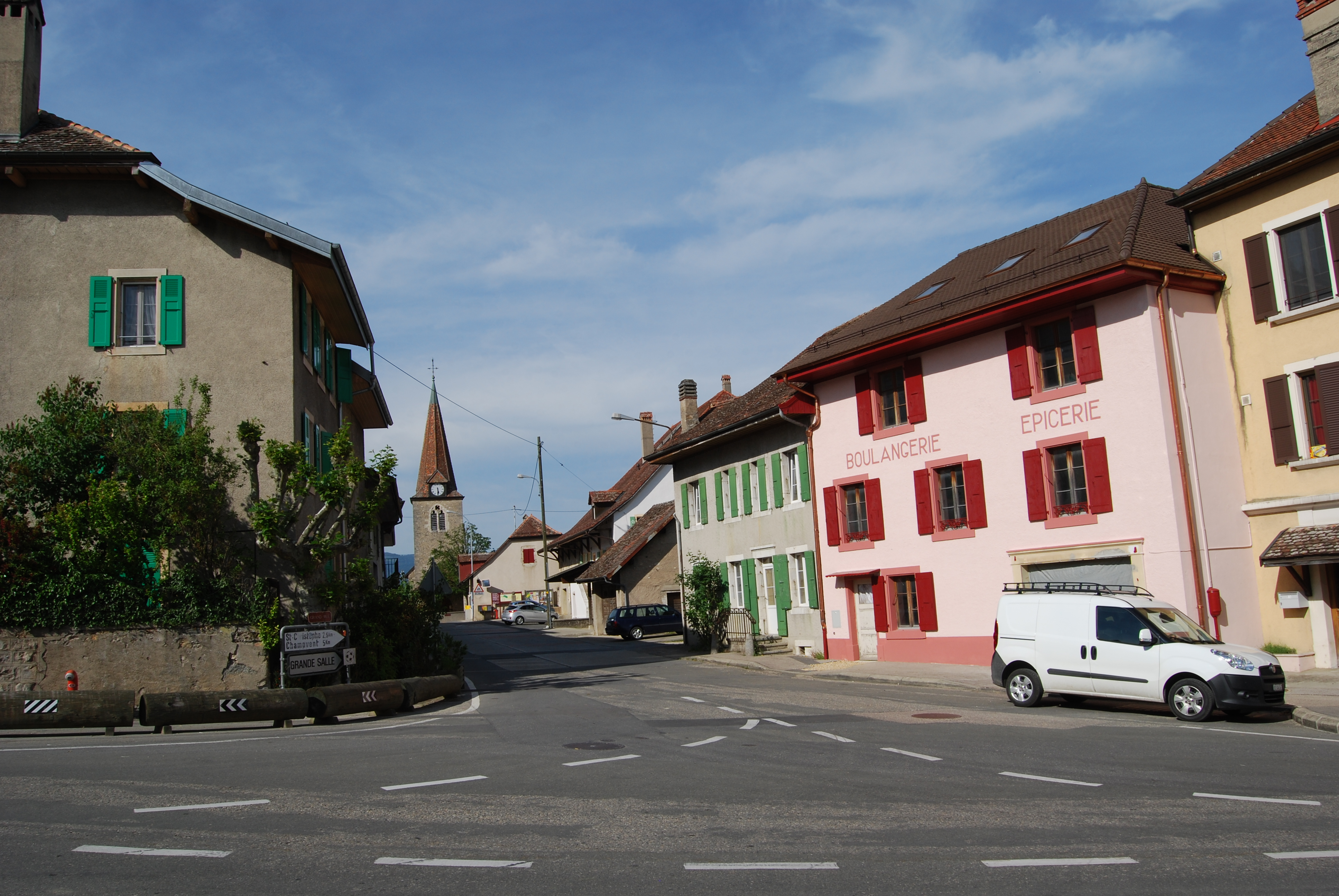

- Flag Coat of arms
- Location of Rances
- Location within Switzerland Location within Canton of Vaud
- Coordinates: 46°46′N 06°32′E
- Country: Switzerland
- Canton: Vaud
- District: Jura-Nord Vaudois

Government
  - Mayor: Syndic; Georges Jaquier

Area
  - Total: 9.84 km^{2} (3.80 sq mi)
- Elevation: 563 m (1,847 ft)

Population (2004)
  - Total: 450
  - Density: 46/km^{2} (120/sq mi)
- Demonym: Les Ransignolets
- Time zone: UTC+01:00 (CET)
  - Summer (DST): UTC+02:00 (CEST)
- Postal code: 1439
- SFOS number: 5760
- ISO 3166 code: CH-VD
- Surrounded by: Baulmes, Champvent, Mathod, Valeyres-sous-Rances, Sergey, L'Abergement
- Website: www.rances.ch

Rances (French pronunciation: [ʁɑ̃s]) is a municipality in the district of Jura-Nord Vaudois of the canton of Vaud in Switzerland.

== History ==
Rances is first mentioned around 972-73 as Rancias.

The name of Rances is apparently derived from a Roman family name, but the exact form of the name has been forgotten. The most dramatic event of its history occurred in 1548, when the village was almost entirely destroyed by an accidental fire.

It has been the site of extensive archeological excavations, notably by the University of Geneva.

== Geography ==
Rances has an area, as of 2009, of 9.8 square kilometers (3.8 mi^{2}). Of this area, 5.9 km^{2} (2.3 mi^{2}) or 60.0% is used for agricultural purposes, while 3.41 km^{2} (1.32 mi^{2}) or 34.7% is forested. Of the rest of the land, 0.49 km^{2} (0.19 mi^{2}) or 5.0% is settled (buildings or roads) and 0.04 km^{2} (9.9 acres) or 0.4% is unproductive land.

Of the built up area, housing and buildings made up 1.4% and transportation infrastructure made up 3.1%. Out of the forested land, 32.1% of the total land area is heavily forested and 2.5% is covered with orchards or small clusters of trees. Of the agricultural land, 35.7% is used for growing crops and 8.3% is pastures, while 2.8% is used for orchards or vine crops and 13.1% is used for alpine pastures.

The municipality was part of the Orbe District until it was dissolved on 31 August 2006, and Rances became part of the new district of Jura-Nord Vaudois.

The municipality is located on a high plateau above the Mujon river valley, a tributary of the Zihl river.

== Coat of arms ==
The blazon of the municipal coat of arms is Argent, a Column Or encircled with a Vine Vert fructed Purpure.

== Demographics ==
Rances has a population (as of December 2020) of 513. As of 2008, 6.2% of the population are resident foreign nationals. Over the last 10 years (1999–2009 ) the population has changed at a rate of 8%. It has changed at a rate of 3.6% due to migration and at a rate of 4.6% due to births and deaths.

Most of the population (as of 2000) speaks French (405 or 96.7%), with German being second most common (5 or 1.2%) and Italian being third (3 or 0.7%).

The age distribution, as of 2009, in Rances is; 52 children or 11.6% of the population are between 0 and 9 years old and 57 teenagers or 12.8% are between 10 and 19. Of the adult population, 43 people or 9.6% of the population are between 20 and 29 years old. 66 people or 14.8% are between 30 and 39, 72 people or 16.1% are between 40 and 49, and 71 people or 15.9% are between 50 and 59. The senior population distribution is 41 people or 9.2% of the population are between 60 and 69 years old, 28 people or 6.3% are between 70 and 79, there are 16 people or 3.6% who are between 80 and 89, and there is 1 person who is 90 and older.

As of 2000, there were 167 people who were single and never married in the municipality. There were 218 married individuals, 16 widows or widowers and 18 individuals who are divorced.

As of 2000, there were 166 private households in the municipality, and an average of 2.5 persons per household. There were 39 households that consist of only one person and 17 households with five or more people. Out of a total of 167 households that answered this question, 23.4% were households made up of just one person and there were 2 adults who lived with their parents. Of the rest of the households, there are 58 married couples without children, 57 married couples with children There were 7 single parents with a child or children. There were 3 households that were made up of unrelated people and 1 household that was made up of some sort of institution or another collective housing.

In 2000 there were 70 single family homes (or 57.4% of the total) out of a total of 122 inhabited buildings. There were 22 multi-family buildings (18.0%), along with 25 multi-purpose buildings that were mostly used for housing (20.5%) and 5 other use buildings (commercial or industrial) that also had some housing (4.1%).

In 2000, a total of 161 apartments (93.1% of the total) were permanently occupied, while 3 apartments (1.7%) were seasonally occupied and 9 apartments (5.2%) were empty. As of 2009, the construction rate of new housing units was 0 new units per 1000 residents. The vacancy rate for the municipality, in 2010, was 1.6%.

The historical population is given in the following chart:

== Sights ==
The entire village of Rances is designated as part of the Inventory of Swiss Heritage Sites.

== Politics ==
In the 2007 federal election the most popular party was the SVP which received 36.91% of the vote. The next three most popular parties were the SP (22.59%), the FDP (8.64%) and the LPS Party (8.56%). In the federal election, a total of 159 votes were cast, and the voter turnout was 50.0%.

== Economy ==
As of 2010, Rances had an unemployment rate of 3.4%. As of 2008, there were 30 people employed in the primary economic sector and about 12 businesses involved in this sector. 5 people were employed in the secondary sector and there were 2 businesses in this sector. 42 people were employed in the tertiary sector, with 10 businesses in this sector. There were 225 residents of the municipality who were employed in some capacity, of which females made up 44.0% of the workforce.

In 2008 the total number of full-time equivalent jobs was 61. The number of jobs in the primary sector was 23, all of which were in agriculture. The number of jobs in the secondary sector was 4 of which 2 or (50.0%) were in manufacturing and 2 (50.0%) were in construction. The number of jobs in the tertiary sector was 34. In the tertiary sector; 10 or 29.4% were in wholesale or retail sales or the repair of motor vehicles, 4 or 11.8% were in the movement and storage of goods, 14 or 41.2% were in a hotel or restaurant, 3 or 8.8% were in education.

In 2000, there were 5 workers who commuted into the municipality and 171 workers who commuted away. The municipality is a net exporter of workers, with about 34.2 workers leaving the municipality for every one entering. Of the working population, 6.7% used public transportation to get to work, and 66.7% used a private car.

== Religion ==
From the 2000 census, 63 or 15.0% were Roman Catholic, while 267 or 63.7% belonged to the Swiss Reformed Church. Of the rest of the population, there were 18 individuals (or about 4.30% of the population) who belonged to another Christian church. There was 1 individual who was Jewish, and 63 (or about 15.04% of the population) belonged to no church, are agnostic or atheist, and 15 individuals (or about 3.58% of the population) did not answer the question.

== Education ==
In Rances about 169 or (40.3%) of the population have completed non-mandatory upper secondary education, and 48 or (11.5%) have completed additional higher education (either university or a Fachhochschule). Of the 48 who completed tertiary schooling, 58.3% were Swiss men, 35.4% were Swiss women.

In the 2009/2010 school year there were a total of 74 students in the Rances school district. In the Vaud cantonal school system, two years of non-obligatory pre-school are provided by the political districts. During the school year, the political district provided pre-school care for a total of 578 children of which 359 children (62.1%) received subsidized pre-school care. The canton's primary school program requires students to attend for four years. There were 43 students in the municipal primary school program. The obligatory lower secondary school program lasts for six years and there were 31 students in those schools.

As of 2000, there were 31 students in Rances who came from another municipality, while 68 residents attended schools outside the municipality.
