= L'Abergement =

- Municipality
- Flag Coat of arms
- Location of L'Abergement
- Location within Switzerland Location within Canton of Vaud
- Coordinates: 46°45′N 06°29′E
- Country: Switzerland
- Canton: Vaud
- District: Jura-Nord Vaudois

Government
  - Mayor: Syndic; Roger Roch

Area
  - Total: 5.8 km^{2} (2.2 sq mi)
- Elevation: 653 m (2,142 ft)

Population (2004)
  - Total: 243
  - Density: 42/km^{2} (110/sq mi)
- Demonym: Les Loups
- Time zone: UTC+01:00 (CET)
  - Summer (DST): UTC+02:00 (CEST)
- Postal code: 1355
- SFOS number: 5741
- ISO 3166 code: CH-VD
- Localities: Le Vailloud
- Surrounded by: Baulmes, Rances, Sergey, Les Clées, Lignerolle, France (pays)
- Website: www.labergement.ch

L'Abergement (French pronunciation: [labɛʁʒəmɑ̃]) is a municipality in the district of Jura-Nord Vaudois in the canton of Vaud in Switzerland.

== Geography ==
L'Abergement has an area, as of 2009, of 5.8 square kilometers (2.2 mi^{2}). Of this area, 2.3 km^{2} (0.89 mi^{2}) or 39.8% is used for agricultural purposes, while 3.19 km^{2} (1.23 mi^{2}) or 55.2% is forested. Of the rest of the land, 0.33 km^{2} (0.13 mi^{2}) or 5.7% is settled (buildings or roads).

Of the built up area, housing and buildings made up 3.3% and transportation infrastructure made up 1.6%. Out of the forested land, 51.0% of the total land area is heavily forested and 4.2% is covered with orchards or small clusters of trees. Of the agricultural land, 19.6% is used for growing crops and 6.2% is pastures and 13.7% is used for alpine pastures.

The municipality was part of the Orbe District until it was dissolved on 31 August 2006, and L'Abergement became part of the new district of Jura-Nord Vaudois.

The municipality is located at the foot of the Jura Mountains. It consists of the linear village of L'Abergement and the hamlet of Vailloud.

== Coat of arms ==
The blazon of the municipal coat of arms is Or, a Wolf rampant Sable langued Gules, in chief sinister a Fence of the second.

== Demographics ==
L'Abergement has a population (as of December 2020) of 256. As of 2008, 9.5% of the population are resident foreign nationals. Over the last 10 years (1999–2009 ) the population has changed at a rate of 10.2%. It has changed at a rate of 4% due to migration and at a rate of 6.2% due to births and deaths.

Most of the population (as of 2000) speaks French (227 or 96.6%), with German being second most common (5 or 2.1%) and Italian being third (1 or 0.4%).

The age distribution, as of 2009, in L'Abergement is; 34 children or 13.7% of the population are between 0 and 9 years old and 46 teenagers or 18.5% are between 10 and 19. Of the adult population, 28 people or 11.3% of the population are between 20 and 29 years old. 36 people or 14.5% are between 30 and 39, 27 people or 10.9% are between 40 and 49, and 38 people or 15.3% are between 50 and 59. The senior population distribution is 23 people or 9.3% of the population are between 60 and 69 years old, 11 people or 4.4% are between 70 and 79, there are 5 people or 2.0% who are between 80 and 89.

As of 2000, there were 96 people who were single and never married in the municipality. There were 114 married individuals, 14 widows or widowers and 11 individuals who are divorced.

As of 2000, there were 82 private households in the municipality, and an average of 2.9 persons per household. There were 14 households that consist of only one person and 12 households with five or more people. Out of a total of 83 households that answered this question, 16.9% were households made up of just one person. Of the rest of the households, there are 28 married couples without children, 32 married couples with children There were 8 single parents with a child or children.

In 2000 there were 45 single family homes (or 60.0% of the total) out of a total of 75 inhabited buildings. There were 16 multi-family buildings (21.3%), along with 12 multi-purpose buildings that were mostly used for housing (16.0%) and 2 other use buildings (commercial or industrial) that also had some housing (2.7%).

In 2000, a total of 80 apartments (82.5% of the total) were permanently occupied, while 16 apartments (16.5%) were seasonally occupied and one apartment was empty. As of 2009, the construction rate of new housing units was 0 new units per 1000 residents. The vacancy rate for the municipality, in 2010, was 0%.

The historical population is given in the following chart:

== Politics ==
In the 2007 federal election the most popular party was the SVP which received 44.48% of the vote. The next three most popular parties were the SP (18.49%), the Green Party (13.74%) and the EDU Party (5.58%). In the federal election, a total of 90 votes were cast, and the voter turnout was 54.9%.

== Economy ==
As of 2010, L'Abergement had an unemployment rate of 1.7%. As of 2008, there were 25 people employed in the primary economic sector and about 7 businesses involved in this sector. 24 people were employed in the secondary sector and there were 3 businesses in this sector. 7 people were employed in the tertiary sector, with 5 businesses in this sector. There were 114 residents of the municipality who were employed in some capacity, of which females made up 45.6% of the workforce.

In 2008 the total number of full-time equivalent jobs was 47. The number of jobs in the primary sector was 20, of which 8 were in agriculture and 12 were in forestry or lumber production. The number of jobs in the secondary sector was 22 of which 9 or (40.9%) were in manufacturing and 14 (63.6%) were in construction. The number of jobs in the tertiary sector was 5. In the tertiary sector; 2 or 40.0% were in the movement and storage of goods, 1 was in a hotel or restaurant, 2 or 40.0% were in education.

In 2000, there were 20 workers who commuted into the municipality and 88 workers who commuted away. The municipality is a net exporter of workers, with about 4.4 workers leaving the municipality for every one entering. Of the working population, 3.5% used public transportation to get to work, and 78.9% used a private car.

== Religion ==
From the 2000 census, 27 or 11.5% were Roman Catholic, while 128 or 54.5% belonged to the Swiss Reformed Church. Of the rest of the population, there were 50 individuals (or about 21.28% of the population) who belonged to another Christian church. There were 2 individuals who belonged to another church. 45 (or about 19.15% of the population) belonged to no church, are agnostic or atheist, and 8 individuals (or about 3.40% of the population) did not answer the question.

== Education ==
In L'Abergement about 79 or (33.6%) of the population have completed non-mandatory upper secondary education, and 29 or (12.3%) have completed additional higher education (either university or a Fachhochschule). Of the 29 who completed tertiary schooling, 69.0% were Swiss men, 17.2% were Swiss women.

In the 2009/2010 school year there were a total of 49 students in the L'Abergement school district. In the Vaud cantonal school system, two years of non-obligatory pre-school are provided by the political districts. During the school year, the political district provided pre-school care for a total of 578 children of which 359 children (62.1%) received subsidized pre-school care. The canton's primary school program requires students to attend for four years. There were 30 students in the municipal primary school program. The obligatory lower secondary school program lasts for six years and there were 19 students in those schools.

As of 2000, there were 10 students in L'Abergement who came from another municipality, while 44 residents attended schools outside the municipality.
