= Montcherand =

- Municipality
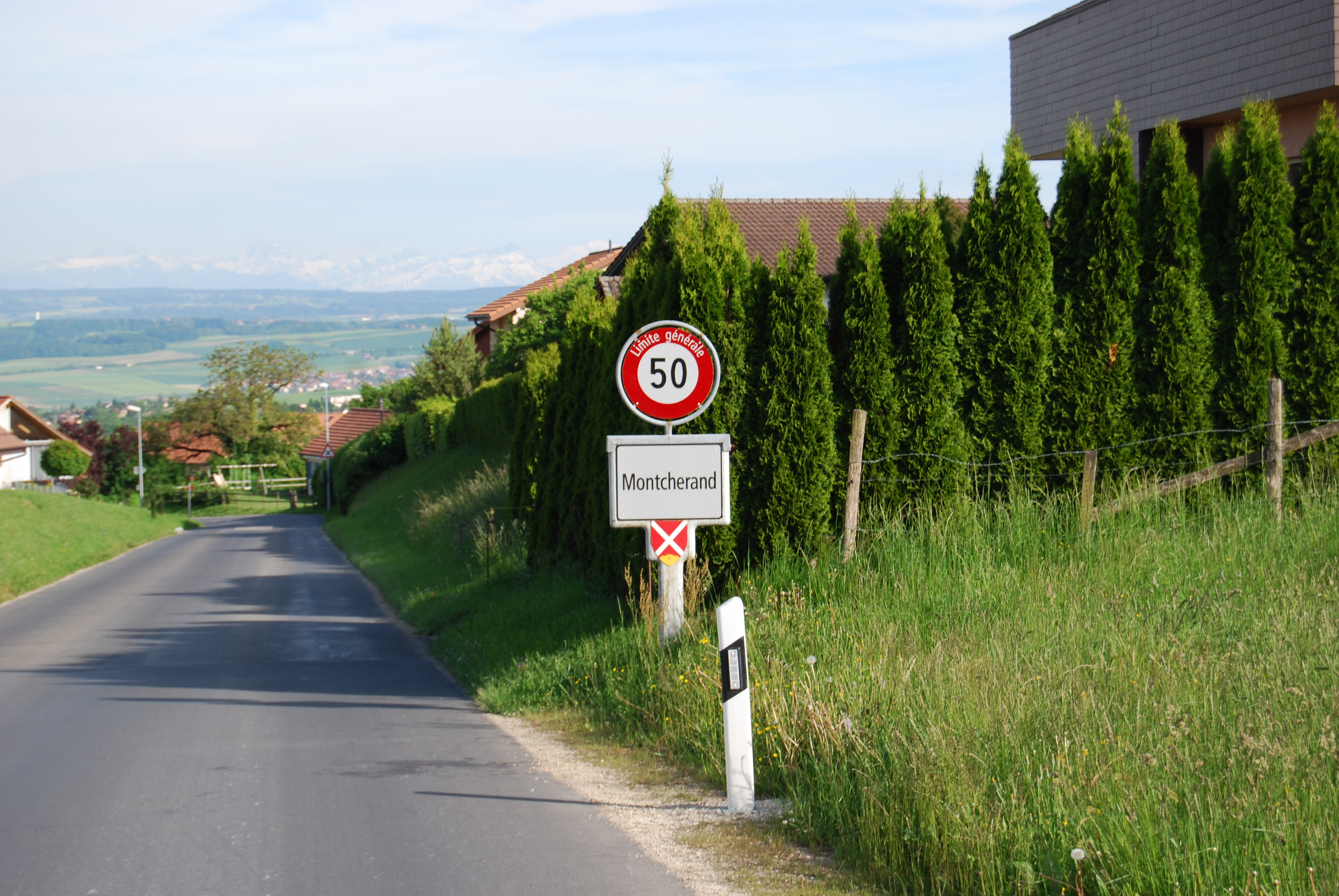

- Flag Coat of arms
- Location of Montcherand
- Location within Switzerland Location within Canton of Vaud
- Coordinates: 46°44′N 06°31′E
- Country: Switzerland
- Canton: Vaud
- District: Jura-Nord Vaudois

Government
  - Mayor: Syndic

Area
  - Total: 3.1 km^{2} (1.2 sq mi)
- Elevation: 556 m (1,824 ft)

Population (2003)
  - Total: 394
  - Density: 130/km^{2} (330/sq mi)
- Time zone: UTC+01:00 (CET)
  - Summer (DST): UTC+02:00 (CEST)
- Postal code: 1354
- SFOS number: 5756
- ISO 3166 code: CH-VD
- Surrounded by: Agiez, Les Clées, Orbe, Sergey, Valeyres-sous-Rances
- Website: www.montcherand.ch

Montcherand (French pronunciation: [mɔ̃ʃ(ə)ʁɑ̃]) is a municipality in the district of Jura-Nord Vaudois in the canton of Vaud in Switzerland.

== History ==
Montcherand is first mentioned in 1324 as Montcherant.

== Geography ==
Montcherand has an area, as of 2009, of 3.1 square kilometers (1.2 mi^{2}). Of this area, 1.62 km^{2} (0.63 mi^{2}) or 52.9% is used for agricultural purposes, while 0.93 km^{2} (0.36 mi^{2}) or 30.4% is forested. Of the rest of the land, 0.42 km^{2} (0.16 mi^{2}) or 13.7% is settled (buildings or roads), 0.01 km^{2} (2.5 acres) or 0.3% is either rivers or lakes and 0.04 km^{2} (9.9 acres) or 1.3% is unproductive land.

Of the built up area, housing and buildings made up 4.2% and transportation infrastructure made up 6.2%. Power and water infrastructure as well as other special developed areas made up 1.6% of the area while parks, green belts and sports fields made up 1.3%. Out of the forested land, 29.1% of the total land area is heavily forested and 1.3% is covered with orchards or small clusters of trees. Of the agricultural land, 37.9% is used for growing crops and 13.4% is pastures, while 1.6% is used for orchards or vine crops. All the water in the municipality is flowing water.

The municipality was part of the Orbe District until it was dissolved on 31 August 2006, and Montcherand became part of the new district of Jura-Nord Vaudois.

The municipality is located north of the Orbe river gorge.

== Coat of arms ==
The blazon of the municipal coat of arms is Gules, a Saltire Argent, in base a Coupeaux Or.

== Demographics ==
Montcherand has a population (as of December 2020) of 505. As of 2008, 11.7% of the population are resident foreign nationals. Over the last 10 years (1999–2009 ) the population has changed at a rate of -3.6%. It has changed at a rate of -10.8% due to migration and at a rate of 7% due to births and deaths.

Most of the population (as of 2000) speaks French (385 or 95.3%), with Portuguese being second most common (5 or 1.2%) and Italian being third (4 or 1.0%). There are 3 people who speak German.

The age distribution, as of 2009, in Montcherand is; 46 children or 10.7% of the population are between 0 and 9 years old and 67 teenagers or 15.6% are between 10 and 19. Of the adult population, 49 people or 11.4% of the population are between 20 and 29 years old. 75 people or 17.5% are between 30 and 39, 64 people or 14.9% are between 40 and 49, and 46 people or 10.7% are between 50 and 59. The senior population distribution is 41 people or 9.6% of the population are between 60 and 69 years old, 25 people or 5.8% are between 70 and 79, there are 13 people or 3.0% who are between 80 and 89, and there are 3 people or 0.7% who are 90 and older.

As of 2000, there were 177 people who were single and never married in the municipality. There were 201 married individuals, 12 widows or widowers and 14 individuals who are divorced.

As of 2000, there were 148 private households in the municipality, and an average of 2.7 persons per household. There were 31 households that consist of only one person and 13 households with five or more people. Out of a total of 150 households that answered this question, 20.7% were households made up of just one person and there were 2 adults who lived with their parents. Of the rest of the households, there are 40 married couples without children, 67 married couples with children There were 4 single parents with a child or children. There were 4 households that were made up of unrelated people and 2 households that were made up of some sort of institution or another collective housing.

In 2000 there were 59 single family homes (or 58.4% of the total) out of a total of 101 inhabited buildings. There were 20 multi-family buildings (19.8%), along with 13 multi-purpose buildings that were mostly used for housing (12.9%) and 9 other use buildings (commercial or industrial) that also had some housing (8.9%).

In 2000, a total of 142 apartments (91.0% of the total) were permanently occupied, while 10 apartments (6.4%) were seasonally occupied and 4 apartments (2.6%) were empty. As of 2009, the construction rate of new housing units was 0 new units per 1000 residents. The vacancy rate for the municipality, in 2010, was 0%.

The historical population is given in the following chart:

== Heritage sites of national significance ==
The Swiss Reformed Church of Sainte-Etienne is listed as a Swiss heritage site of national significance. The entire village of Montcherand is part of the Inventory of Swiss Heritage Sites.

== Politics ==
In the 2007 federal election the most popular party was the SVP which received 31.03% of the vote. The next three most popular parties were the FDP (22.54%), the SP (15.58%) and the LPS Party (8.94%). In the federal election, a total of 125 votes were cast, and the voter turnout was 96.9%.

== Economy ==
As of 2010, Montcherand had an unemployment rate of 3.3%. As of 2008, there were 21 people employed in the primary economic sector and about 7 businesses involved in this sector. 61 people were employed in the secondary sector and there were 7 businesses in this sector. 38 people were employed in the tertiary sector, with 9 businesses in this sector. There were 206 residents of the municipality who were employed in some capacity, of which females made up 44.2% of the workforce.

In 2008 the total number of full-time equivalent jobs was 100. The number of jobs in the primary sector was 15, all of which were in agriculture. The number of jobs in the secondary sector was 55 of which 1 was in manufacturing and 19 (34.5%) were in construction. The number of jobs in the tertiary sector was 30. In the tertiary sector; 17 or 56.7% were in the movement and storage of goods, 2 or 6.7% were in a hotel or restaurant, 7 or 23.3% were technical professionals or scientists, 2 or 6.7% were in education.

In 2000, there were 66 workers who commuted into the municipality and 162 workers who commuted away. The municipality is a net exporter of workers, with about 2.5 workers leaving the municipality for every one entering. About 16.7% of the workforce coming into Montcherand are coming from outside Switzerland. Of the working population, 5.3% used public transportation to get to work, and 75.7% used a private car.

== Religion ==
From the 2000 census, 60 or 14.9% were Roman Catholic, while 284 or 70.3% belonged to the Swiss Reformed Church. Of the rest of the population, there were 15 individuals (or about 3.71% of the population) who belonged to another Christian church. There was 1 person who was Buddhist. 43 (or about 10.64% of the population) belonged to no church, are agnostic or atheist, and 8 individuals (or about 1.98% of the population) did not answer the question.

== Education ==
In Montcherand about 157 or (38.9%) of the population have completed non-mandatory upper secondary education, and 44 or (10.9%) have completed additional higher education (either university or a Fachhochschule). Of the 44 who completed tertiary schooling, 70.5% were Swiss men, 20.5% were Swiss women.

In the 2009/2010 school year there were a total of 54 students in the Montcherand school district. In the Vaud cantonal school system, two years of non-obligatory pre-school are provided by the political districts. During the school year, the political district provided pre-school care for a total of 578 children of which 359 children (62.1%) received subsidized pre-school care. The canton's primary school program requires students to attend for four years. There were 24 students in the municipal primary school program. The obligatory lower secondary school program lasts for six years and there were 29 students in those schools. There was also 1 student who was home schooled or attended another non-traditional school.

As of 2000, there were 7 students in Montcherand who came from another municipality, while 77 residents attended schools outside the municipality.
