= Baulmes =

- Municipality
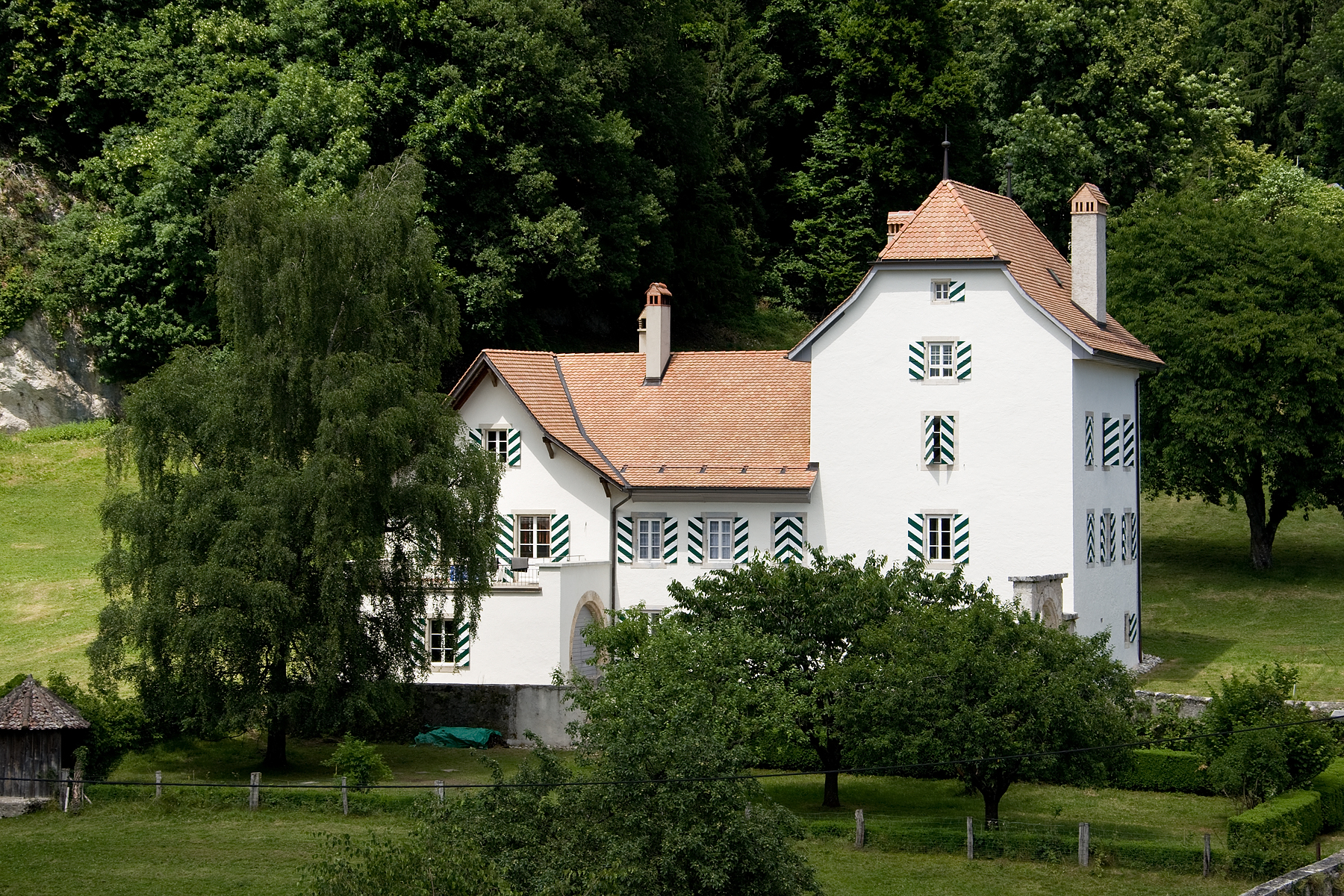
- La Cure in Baulmes village

- Flag Coat of arms
- Location of Baulmes
- Location within Switzerland Location within Canton of Vaud
- Coordinates: 46°47′N 06°31′E
- Country: Switzerland
- Canton: Vaud
- District: Vaudois

Government
  - Mayor: Syndic; Olivier Mettraux

Area
  - Total: 22.53 km^{2} (8.70 sq mi)
- Elevation: 641 m (2,103 ft)

Population (2004)
  - Total: 960
  - Density: 43/km^{2} (110/sq mi)
- Demonym(s): Les Baulmérans; Lè Rebata-tsaudère
- Time zone: UTC+01:00 (CET)
  - Summer (DST): UTC+02:00 (CEST)
- Postal code: 1446
- SFOS number: 5745
- ISO 3166 code: CH-VD
- Surrounded by: Champvent, Jougne (FR-25), L'Abergement, Les Hôpitaux-Vieux (FR-25), Rances, Sainte-Croix, Vuiteboeuf
- Twin towns: Mont-Saint-Sulpice (France)
- Website: www.baulmes.ch

Baulmes (French pronunciation: [bom], more rarely French pronunciation: [bolm]) is a municipality in the district of Vaudois in the canton of Vaud in Switzerland.

== History ==
Baulmes is first mentioned in 652 as in loco Balmensi. In 1123 it was mentioned as Balmis.

== Geography ==
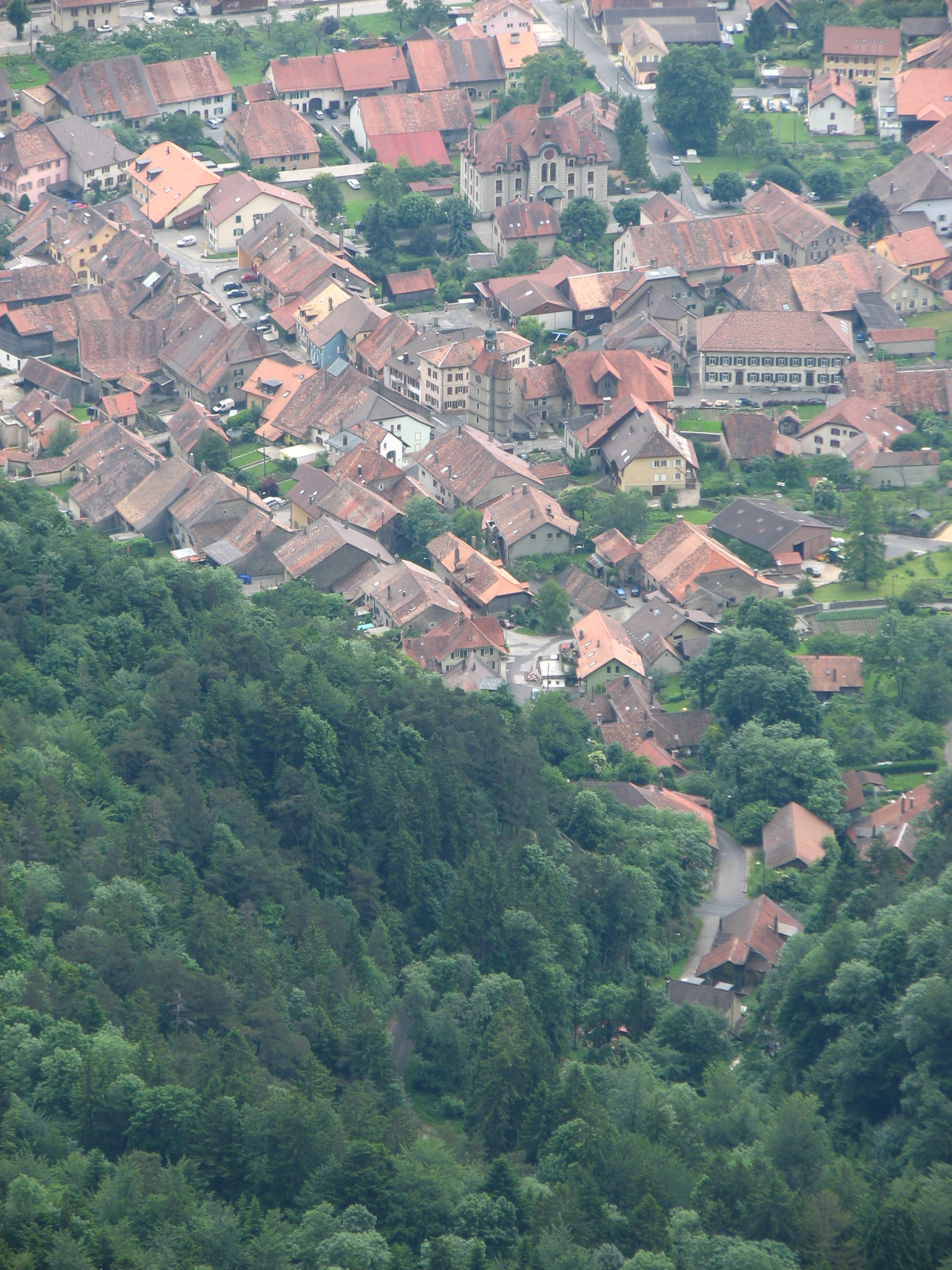
Baulmes village

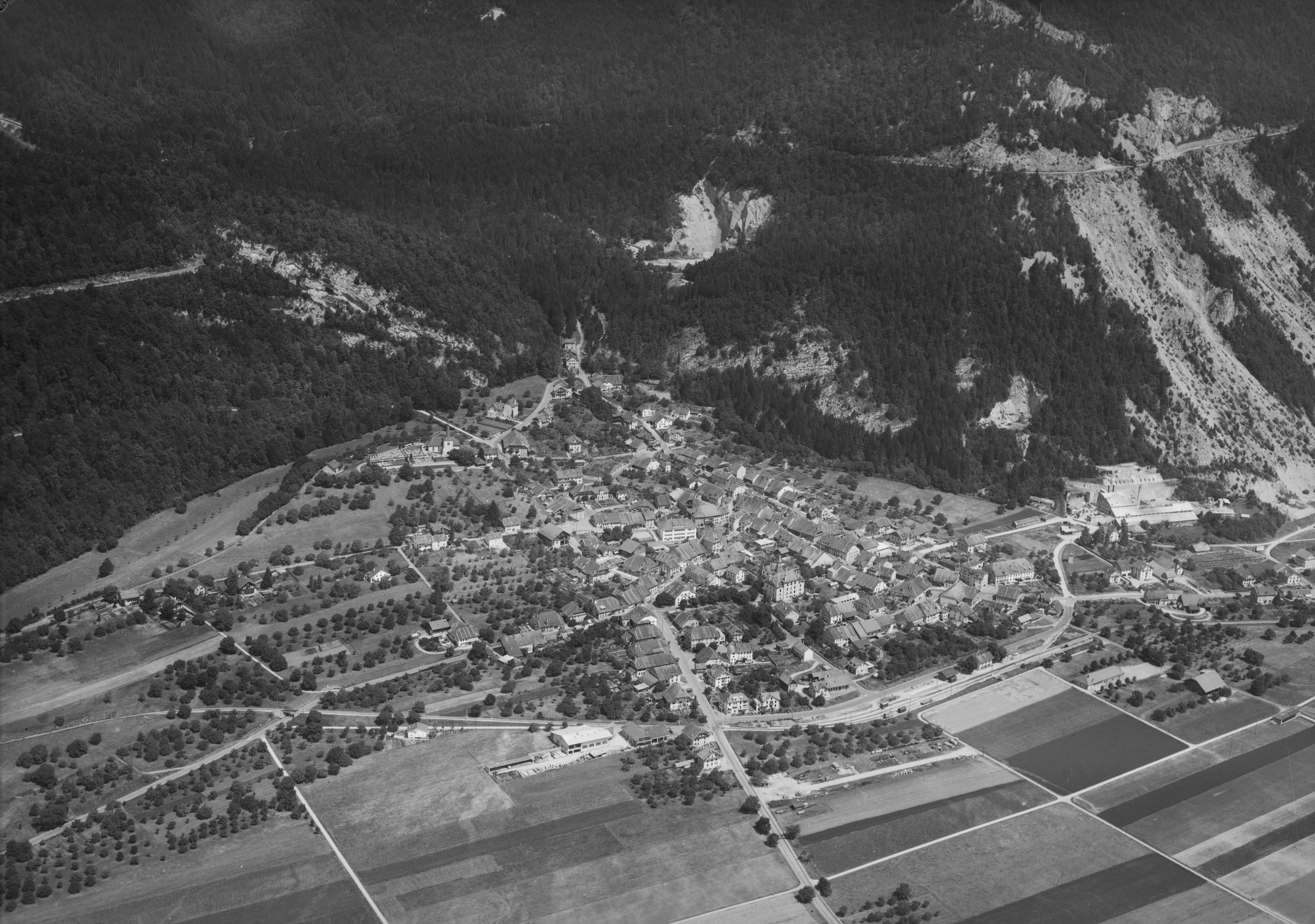
Aerial view (1964)

Baulmes has an area, as of 2009, of 22.5 square kilometers (8.7 mi^{2}). Of this area, 9.02 km^{2} (3.48 mi^{2}) or 40.0% is used for agricultural purposes, while 12.4 km^{2} (4.8 mi^{2}) or 55.0% is forested. Of the rest of the land, 0.91 km^{2} (0.35 mi^{2}) or 4.0% is settled (buildings or roads), 0.04 km^{2} (9.9 acres) or 0.2% is either rivers or lakes and 0.18 km^{2} (0.069 mi^{2}) or 0.8% is unproductive land.

Of the built up area, housing and buildings made up 0.8% and transportation infrastructure made up 2.3%. Out of the forested land, 52.1% of the total land area is heavily forested and 2.9% is covered with orchards or small clusters of trees. Of the agricultural land, 19.0% is used for growing crops and 3.6% is pastures and 16.8% is used for alpine pastures. All the water in the municipality is flowing water.

The municipality was part of the Orbe District until it was dissolved on 31 August 2006, and Baulmes became part of the new district of Jura-Nord Vaudois.

The municipality is located on the alluvial fan of the Baumine on the border with France. It lies at the east end of the road over the Col de l'Aiguillon in the Jura Mountains.

== Coat of arms ==
The blazon of the municipal coat of arms is Azure, a saltire Argent.

== Demographics ==
Baulmes has a population (as of December 2020) of 1,075. As of 2008, 12.3% of the population are resident foreign nationals. Over the last 10 years (1999–2009 ) the population has changed at a rate of 1%. It has changed at a rate of 0.9% due to migration and at a rate of 0.5% due to births and deaths.

Most of the population (as of 2000) speaks French (848 or 87.4%), with Serbo-Croatian being second most common (35 or 3.6%) and German being third (26 or 2.7%). There are 20 people who speak Italian.

The age distribution, as of 2009, in Baulmes is; 95 children or 9.7% of the population are between 0 and 9 years old and 150 teenagers or 15.4% are between 10 and 19. Of the adult population, 114 people or 11.7% of the population are between 20 and 29 years old. 103 people or 10.6% are between 30 and 39, 151 people or 15.5% are between 40 and 49, and 158 people or 16.2% are between 50 and 59. The senior population distribution is 106 people or 10.9% of the population are between 60 and 69 years old, 59 people or 6.0% are between 70 and 79, there are 35 people or 3.6% who are between 80 and 89, and there are 5 people or 0.5% who are 90 and older.

As of 2000, there were 402 people who were single and never married in the municipality. There were 477 married individuals, 53 widows or widowers and 38 individuals who are divorced.

As of 2000, there were 373 private households in the municipality, and an average of 2.6 persons per household. There were 109 households that consist of only one person and 38 households with five or more people. Out of a total of 380 households that answered this question, 28.7% were households made up of just one person and there was 1 adult who lived with their parents. Of the rest of the households, there are 94 married couples without children, 144 married couples with children There were 21 single parents with a child or children. There were 4 households that were made up of unrelated people and 7 households that were made up of some sort of institution or another collective housing.

In 2000 there were 93 single family homes (or 42.7% of the total) out of a total of 218 inhabited buildings. There were 65 multi-family buildings (29.8%), along with 50 multi-purpose buildings that were mostly used for housing (22.9%) and 10 other use buildings (commercial or industrial) that also had some housing (4.6%).

In 2000, a total of 365 apartments (85.1% of the total) were permanently occupied, while 40 apartments (9.3%) were seasonally occupied and 24 apartments (5.6%) were empty. As of 2009, the construction rate of new housing units was 3.1 new units per 1000 residents. The vacancy rate for the municipality, in 2010, was 0%.

The historical population is given in the following chart:

== Heritage sites of national significance ==
The prehistoric shelter at Abri De La Cure and the Beffroi communal are listed as Swiss heritage site of national significance. The entire village of Baulmes is part of the Inventory of Swiss Heritage Sites.

== Twin Town ==
Baulmes is twinned with the town of Mont-Saint-Sulpice, France.

== Politics ==
In the 2007 federal election the most popular party was the SP which received 27.4% of the vote. The next three most popular parties were the SVP (24.79%), the Green Party (15.61%) and the FDP (10.94%). In the federal election, a total of 296 votes were cast, and the voter turnout was 46.3%.

== Economy ==
As of 2010, Baulmes had an unemployment rate of 3.7%. As of 2008, there were 43 people employed in the primary economic sector and about 18 businesses involved in this sector. 161 people were employed in the secondary sector and there were 14 businesses in this sector. 80 people were employed in the tertiary sector, with 22 businesses in this sector. There were 441 residents of the municipality who were employed in some capacity, of which females made up 40.1% of the workforce.

In 2008 the total number of full-time equivalent jobs was 251. The number of jobs in the primary sector was 30, of which 28 were in agriculture and 2 were in forestry or lumber production. The number of jobs in the secondary sector was 156 of which 37 or (23.7%) were in manufacturing and 118 (75.6%) were in construction. The number of jobs in the tertiary sector was 65. In the tertiary sector; 31 or 47.7% were in wholesale or retail sales or the repair of motor vehicles, 1 was in the movement and storage of goods, 14 or 21.5% were in a hotel or restaurant, 2 or 3.1% were the insurance or financial industry, 4 or 6.2% were technical professionals or scientists, 2 or 3.1% were in education and 2 or 3.1% were in health care.

In 2000, there were 155 workers who commuted into the municipality and 280 workers who commuted away. The municipality is a net exporter of workers, with about 1.8 workers leaving the municipality for every one entering. About 16.8% of the workforce coming into Baulmes are coming from outside Switzerland. Of the working population, 15.4% used public transportation to get to work, and 57.1% used a private car.

== Transport ==
The meter gauge electric Yverdon–Ste-Croix railway line links Baulmes with Yverdon-les-Bains and Sainte Croix.

== Religion ==
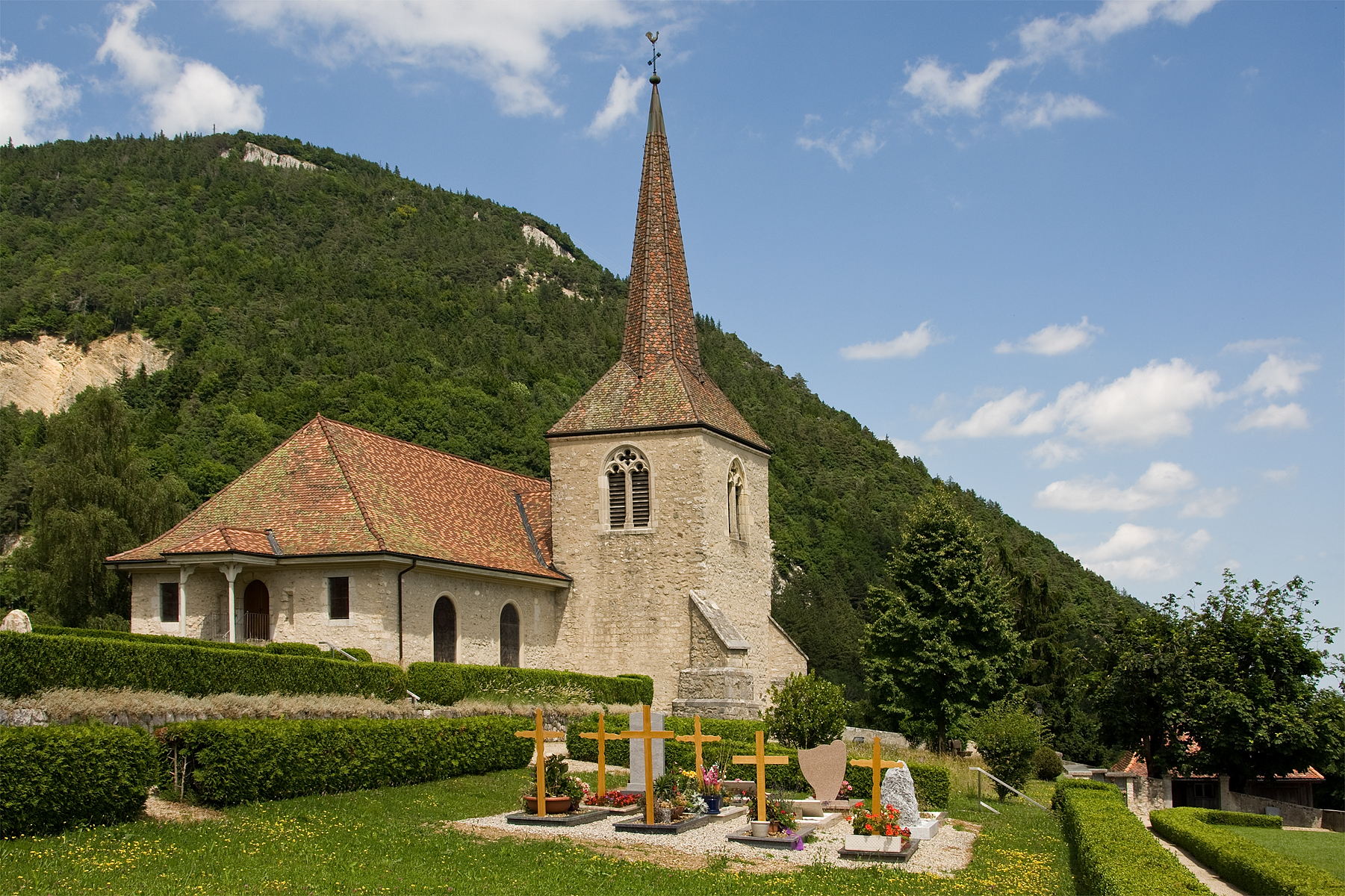
Baulmes church

From the 2000 census, 205 or 21.1% were Roman Catholic, while 519 or 53.5% belonged to the Swiss Reformed Church. Of the rest of the population, there were 6 members of an Orthodox church (or about 0.62% of the population), there were 2 individuals (or about 0.21% of the population) who belonged to the Christian Catholic Church, and there were 17 individuals (or about 1.75% of the population) who belonged to another Christian church. There were 41 (or about 4.23% of the population) who were Islamic. There was 1 person who was Buddhist. 145 (or about 14.95% of the population) belonged to no church, are agnostic or atheist, and 42 individuals (or about 4.33% of the population) did not answer the question.

== Weather ==
Baulmes has an average of 133.9 days of rain or snow per year and on average receives 1,276 mm (50.2 in) of precipitation. The wettest month is December during which time Baulmes receives an average of 133 mm (5.2 in) of rain or snow. During this month there is precipitation for an average of 12.1 days. The month with the most days of precipitation is May, with an average of 13.3, but with only 109 mm (4.3 in) of rain or snow. The driest month of the year is September with an average of 88 mm (3.5 in) of precipitation over 8.4 days.

== Education ==
In Baulmes about 339 or (34.9%) of the population have completed non-mandatory upper secondary education, and 125 or (12.9%) have completed additional higher education (either university or a Fachhochschule). Of the 125 who completed tertiary schooling, 64.0% were Swiss men, 24.0% were Swiss women, 9.6% were non-Swiss men.

In the 2009/2010 school year there were a total of 137 students in the Baulmes school district. In the Vaud cantonal school system, two years of non-obligatory pre-school are provided by the political districts. During the school year, the political district provided pre-school care for a total of 578 children of which 359 children (62.1%) received subsidized pre-school care. The canton's primary school program requires students to attend for four years. There were 71 students in the municipal primary school program. The obligatory lower secondary school program lasts for six years and there were 65 students in those schools. There was also 1 student who was home schooled or attended another non-traditional school.

As of 2000, there were 163 students in Baulmes who came from another municipality, while 107 residents attended schools outside the municipality.

== See also ==
- Aiguilles de Baulmes
