= Mathod =

- Municipality
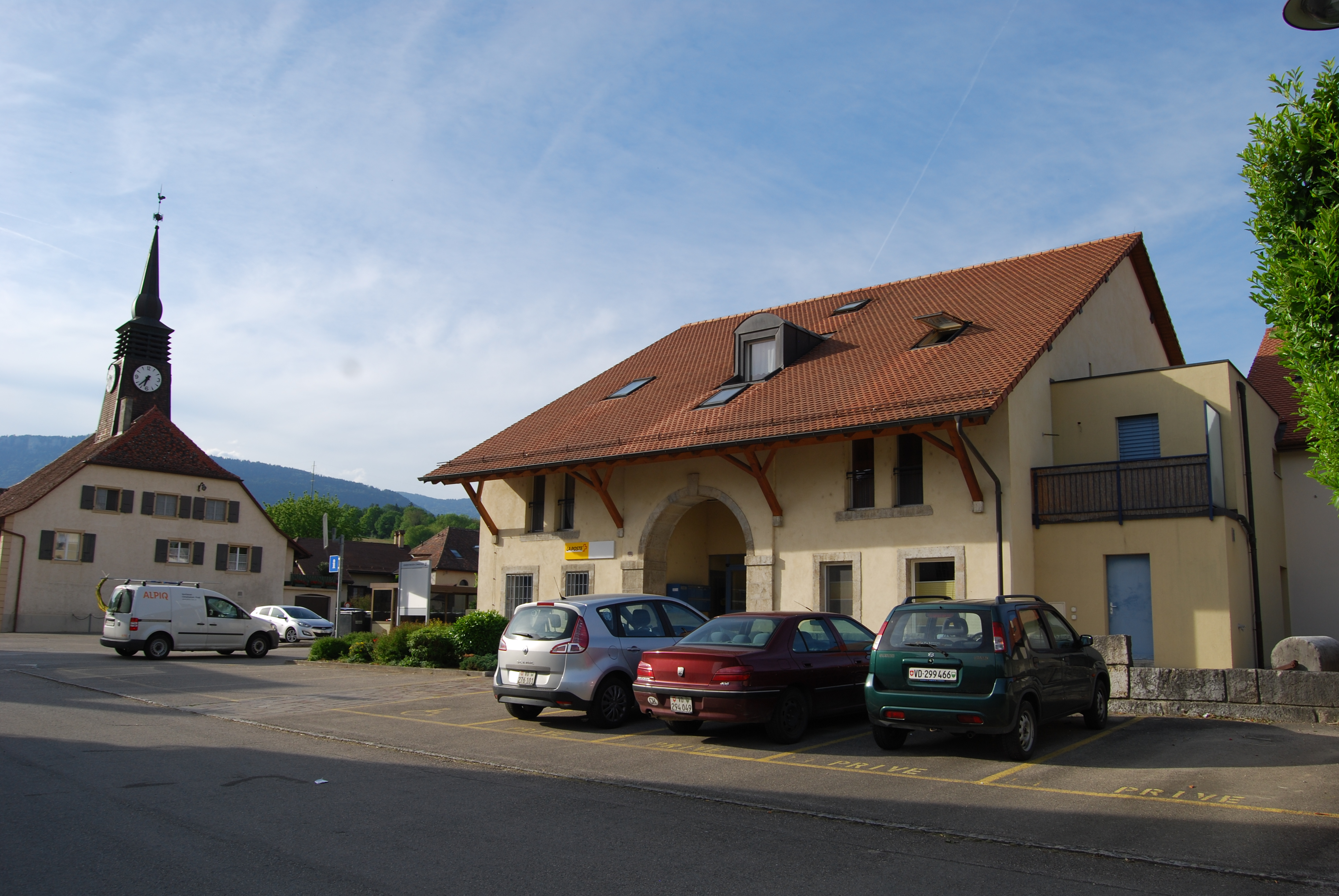

- Flag Coat of arms
- Location of Mathod
- Location within Switzerland Location within Canton of Vaud
- Coordinates: 46°46′N 6°34′E
- Country: Switzerland
- Canton: Vaud
- District: Jura-Nord Vaudois

Government
  - Mayor: Syndic

Area
  - Total: 6.59 km^{2} (2.54 sq mi)
- Elevation: 445 m (1,460 ft)

Population (2003)
  - Total: 486
  - Density: 73.7/km^{2} (191/sq mi)
- Time zone: UTC+01:00 (CET)
  - Summer (DST): UTC+02:00 (CEST)
- Postal code: 1438
- SFOS number: 5919
- ISO 3166 code: CH-VD
- Surrounded by: Champvent, Épendes, Orbe, Rances, Suscévaz, Valeyres-sous-Rances
- Website: http://www.mathod.ch Profile (in French), SFSO statistics

Mathod is a municipality in the district of Jura-Nord Vaudois of the canton of Vaud in Switzerland.

== History ==
Mathod is first mentioned in 1141 as Mastod.

== Geography ==
Mathod has an area, as of 2009, of 6.6 square kilometers (2.5 mi^{2}). Of this area, 5.59 km^{2} (2.16 mi^{2}) or 84.8% is used for agricultural purposes, while 0.55 km^{2} (0.21 mi^{2}) or 8.3% is forested. Of the rest of the land, 0.37 km^{2} (0.14 mi^{2}) or 5.6% is settled (buildings or roads), 0.1 km^{2} (25 acres) or 1.5% is either rivers or lakes.

Of the built up area, housing and buildings made up 2.9% and transportation infrastructure made up 1.5%. Out of the forested land, 7.3% of the total land area is heavily forested and 1.1% is covered with orchards or small clusters of trees. Of the agricultural land, 75.9% is used for growing crops and 6.2% is pastures, while 2.7% is used for orchards or vine crops. All the water in the municipality is flowing water.

The municipality was part of the Yverdon District until it was dissolved on 31 August 2006, and Mathod became part of the new district of Jura-Nord Vaudois.

The municipality is located in the Mujon valley, a tributary of the Thielle river.

== Coat of arms ==
The blazon of the municipal coat of arms is Pally of Six Argent and Azure, overall on a Bend dancety Gules three Cat's heads affronty Or.

== Demographics ==
Mathod has a population (as of December 2020) of 651. As of 2008, 13.3% of the population are resident foreign nationals. Over the last 10 years (1999–2009 ) the population has changed at a rate of 21.8%. It has changed at a rate of 10.9% due to migration and at a rate of 10.2% due to births and deaths.

Most of the population (as of 2000) speaks French (416 or 90.6%) as their first language, with Portuguese being second most common (22 or 4.8%) and German being third (16 or 3.5%). There are 2 people who speak Italian.

The age distribution, as of 2009, in Mathod is; 90 children or 16.5% of the population are between 0 and 9 years old and 73 teenagers or 13.3% are between 10 and 19. Of the adult population, 68 people or 12.4% of the population are between 20 and 29 years old. 82 people or 15.0% are between 30 and 39, 87 people or 15.9% are between 40 and 49, and 56 people or 10.2% are between 50 and 59. The senior population distribution is 48 people or 8.8% of the population are between 60 and 69 years old, 23 people or 4.2% are between 70 and 79, there are 19 people or 3.5% who are between 80 and 89, and there is 1 person who is 90 and older.

As of 2000, there were 193 people who were single and never married in the municipality. There were 234 married individuals, 20 widows or widowers and 12 individuals who are divorced.

As of 2000, there were 173 private households in the municipality, and an average of 2.6 persons per household. There were 44 households that consist of only one person and 19 households with five or more people. Out of a total of 176 households that answered this question, 25.0% were households made up of just one person and there were 4 adults who lived with their parents. Of the rest of the households, there are 44 married couples without children, 68 married couples with children There were 11 single parents with a child or children. There were 2 households that were made up of unrelated people and 3 households that were made up of some sort of institution or another collective housing.

In 2000 there were 51 single family homes (or 46.4% of the total) out of a total of 110 inhabited buildings. There were 23 multi-family buildings (20.9%), along with 28 multi-purpose buildings that were mostly used for housing (25.5%) and 8 other use buildings (commercial or industrial) that also had some housing (7.3%).

In 2000, a total of 157 apartments (87.2% of the total) were permanently occupied, while 19 apartments (10.6%) were seasonally occupied and 4 apartments (2.2%) were empty. As of 2009, the construction rate of new housing units was 1.8 new units per 1000 residents. The vacancy rate for the municipality, in 2010, was 0.45%.

The historical population is given in the following chart:

== Heritage sites of national significance ==
Mathod Castle is listed as a Swiss heritage site of national significance.

== Politics ==
In the 2007 federal election the most popular party was the SVP which received 31.66% of the vote. The next three most popular parties were the SP (17.9%), the FDP (17.6%) and the Green Party (12.81%). In the federal election, a total of 168 votes were cast, and the voter turnout was 49.7%.

== Economy ==
As of 2010, Mathod had an unemployment rate of 3.8%. As of 2008, there were 38 people employed in the primary economic sector and about 12 businesses involved in this sector. 22 people were employed in the secondary sector and there were 4 businesses in this sector. 44 people were employed in the tertiary sector, with 15 businesses in this sector. There were 242 residents of the municipality who were employed in some capacity, of which females made up 43.0% of the workforce.

In 2008 the total number of full-time equivalent jobs was 83. The number of jobs in the primary sector was 31, all of which were in agriculture. The number of jobs in the secondary sector was 19 of which 15 or (78.9%) were in manufacturing and 4 (21.1%) were in construction. The number of jobs in the tertiary sector was 33. In the tertiary sector; 6 or 18.2% were in wholesale or retail sales or the repair of motor vehicles, 1 was in the movement and storage of goods, 5 or 15.2% were in a hotel or restaurant, 1 was the insurance or financial industry, 3 or 9.1% were technical professionals or scientists, 3 or 9.1% were in education.

In 2000, there were 50 workers who commuted into the municipality and 166 workers who commuted away. The municipality is a net exporter of workers, with about 3.3 workers leaving the municipality for every one entering. About 10.0% of the workforce coming into Mathod are coming from outside Switzerland. Of the working population, 13.6% used public transportation to get to work, and 58.3% used a private car.

== Religion ==
From the 2000 census, 92 or 20.0% were Roman Catholic, while 286 or 62.3% belonged to the Swiss Reformed Church. Of the rest of the population, there was 1 member of an Orthodox church, and there were 30 individuals (or about 6.54% of the population) who belonged to another Christian church. There was 1 individual who was Islamic. There was 1 person who was Buddhist. 46 (or about 10.02% of the population) belonged to no church, are agnostic or atheist, and 17 individuals (or about 3.70% of the population) did not answer the question.

== Education ==
In Mathod about 177 or (38.6%) of the population have completed non-mandatory upper secondary education, and 54 or (11.8%) have completed additional higher education (either university or a Fachhochschule). Of the 54 who completed tertiary schooling, 51.9% were Swiss men, 29.6% were Swiss women, 13.0% were non-Swiss men.

In the 2009/2010 school year there were a total of 95 students in the Mathod school district. In the Vaud cantonal school system, two years of non-obligatory pre-school are provided by the political districts. During the school year, the political district provided pre-school care for a total of 578 children of which 359 children (62.1%) received subsidized pre-school care. The canton's primary school program requires students to attend for four years. There were 52 students in the municipal primary school program. The obligatory lower secondary school program lasts for six years and there were 38 students in those schools. There were also 5 students who were home schooled or attended another non-traditional school.

As of 2000, there were 14 students in Mathod who came from another municipality, while 76 residents attended schools outside the municipality.
