= Valeyres-sous-Rances =

- Municipality
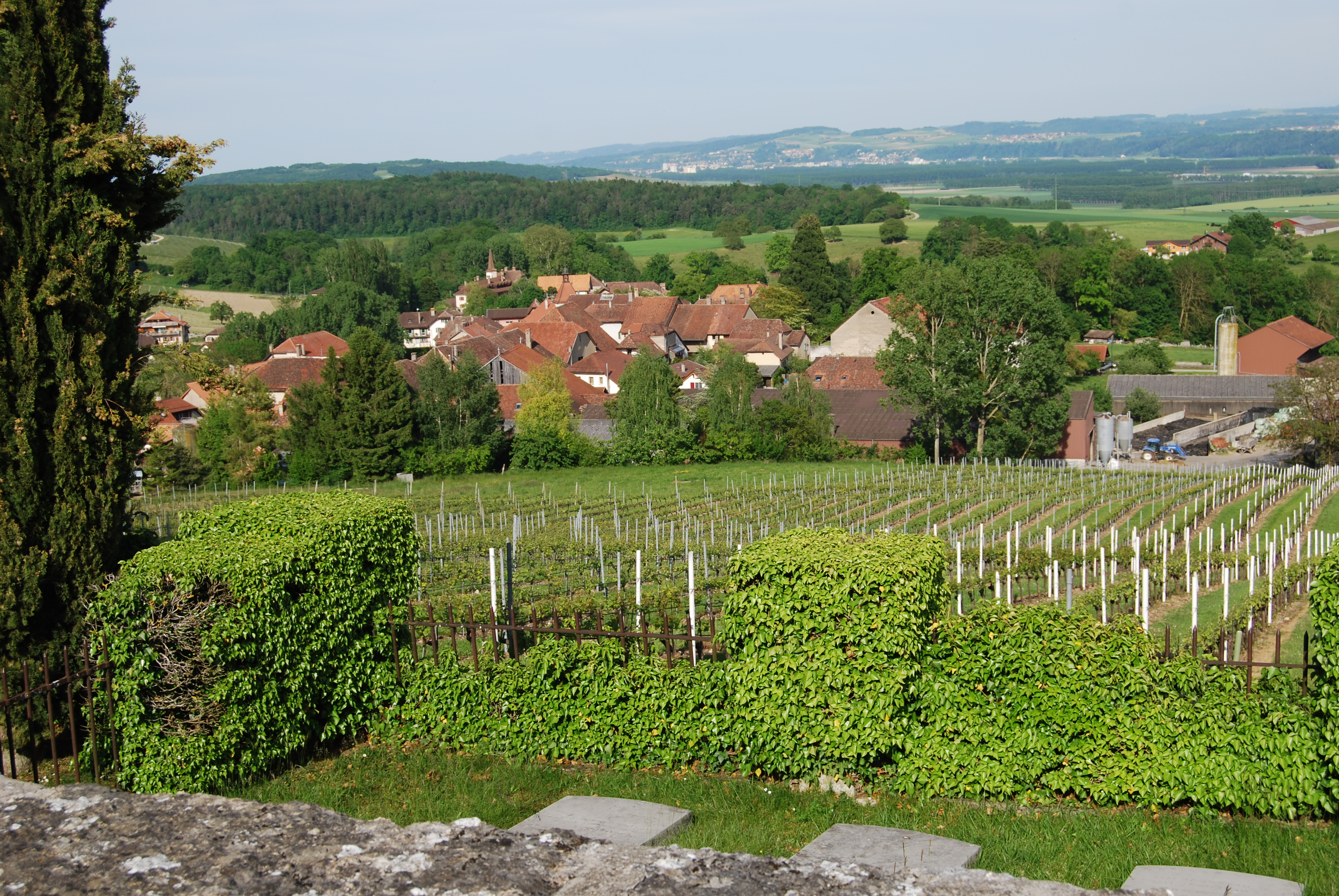

- Flag Coat of arms
- Location of Valeyres-sous-Rances
- Location within Switzerland Location within Canton of Vaud
- Coordinates: 46°45′N 06°32′E
- Country: Switzerland
- Canton: Vaud
- District: Jura-Nord Vaudois

Government
  - Mayor: Syndic; Jean-Paul Vidmer

Area
  - Total: 6.35 km^{2} (2.45 sq mi)
- Elevation: 509 m (1,670 ft)

Population (2004)
  - Total: 497
  - Density: 78.3/km^{2} (203/sq mi)
- Demonym(s): Les Valeyriens; Les Renards; Les Hirondelles
- Time zone: UTC+01:00 (CET)
  - Summer (DST): UTC+02:00 (CEST)
- Postal code: 1358
- SFOS number: 5763
- ISO 3166 code: CH-VD
- Surrounded by: Rances, Mathod, Orbe, Montcherand, Sergey
- Website: https://www.valeyres-sous-rances.ch Profile (in French), SFSO statistics

Valeyres-sous-Rances (French pronunciation: [valɛʁ su ʁɑ̃s], literally Valeyres under Rances) is a municipality in the district of Jura-Nord Vaudois in the canton of Vaud in Switzerland.

== Geography ==
Valeyres-sous-Rances has an area, as of 2009, of 6.4 square kilometers (2.5 mi^{2}). Of this area, 5.2 km^{2} (2.0 mi^{2}) or 81.6% is used for agricultural purposes, while 0.7 km^{2} (0.27 mi^{2}) or 11.0% is forested. Of the rest of the land, 0.44 km^{2} (0.17 mi^{2}) or 6.9% is settled (buildings or roads), 0.04 km^{2} (9.9 acres) or 0.6% is either rivers or lakes and 0.01 km^{2} (2.5 acres) or 0.2% is unproductive land.

Of the built up area, housing and buildings made up 3.0% and transportation infrastructure made up 3.5%. Out of the forested land, 9.1% of the total land area is heavily forested and 1.9% is covered with orchards or small clusters of trees. Of the agricultural land, 69.9% is used for growing crops and 8.2% is pastures, while 3.6% is used for orchards or vine crops. All the water in the municipality is flowing water.

The municipality was part of the Orbe District until it was dissolved on 31 August 2006, and Valeyres-sous-Rances became part of the new district of Jura-Nord Vaudois.

== Coat of arms ==
The blazon of the municipal coat of arms is Vert, a Bend wavy Argent, in Chief three Wheat Ears Or, two and one, in base a Grape-bunch of the same

== Demographics ==
Valeyres-sous-Rances has a population (as of December 2020) of 610. As of 2008, 15.2% of the population are resident foreign nationals. Over the last 10 years (1999–2009 ) the population has changed at a rate of 0%. It has changed at a rate of -2.4% due to migration and at a rate of 2.6% due to births and deaths.

Most of the population (as of 2000) speaks French (472 or 95.0%), with German being second most common (9 or 1.8%) and Italian being third (4 or 0.8%).

The age distribution, as of 2009, in Valeyres-sous-Rances is; 50 children or 9.9% of the population are between 0 and 9 years old and 89 teenagers or 17.6% are between 10 and 19. Of the adult population, 67 people or 13.2% of the population are between 20 and 29 years old. 56 people or 11.0% are between 30 and 39, 90 people or 17.8% are between 40 and 49, and 73 people or 14.4% are between 50 and 59. The senior population distribution is 39 people or 7.7% of the population are between 60 and 69 years old, 25 people or 4.9% are between 70 and 79, there are 13 people or 2.6% who are between 80 and 89, and there are 5 people or 1.0% who are 90 and older.

As of 2000, there were 201 people who were single and never married in the municipality. There were 252 married individuals, 18 widows or widowers and 26 individuals who are divorced.

As of 2000, there were 191 private households in the municipality, and an average of 2.6 persons per household. There were 48 households that consist of only one person and 18 households with five or more people. Out of a total of 193 households that answered this question, 24.9% were households made up of just one person and there was 1 adult who lived with their parents. Of the rest of the households, there are 51 married couples without children, 76 married couples with children There were 13 single parents with a child or children. There were 2 households that were made up of unrelated people and 2 households that were made up of some sort of institution or another collective housing.

In 2000 there were 81 single family homes (or 57.9% of the total) out of a total of 140 inhabited buildings. There were 23 multi-family buildings (16.4%), along with 27 multi-purpose buildings that were mostly used for housing (19.3%) and 9 other use buildings (commercial or industrial) that also had some housing (6.4%). In 2000, a total of 174 apartments (81.7% of the total) were permanently occupied, while 33 apartments (15.5%) were seasonally occupied and 6 apartments (2.8%) were empty. As of 2009, the construction rate of new housing units was 0 new units per 1000 residents. The vacancy rate for the municipality, in 2010, was 0.46%.

The historical population is given in the following chart:

== Heritage sites of national significance ==
The Bonstetten House is listed as a Swiss heritage site of national significance. The entire village of Valeyres-sous-Rances is part of the Inventory of Swiss Heritage Sites.

== Politics ==
In the 2007 federal election the most popular party was the SVP which received 39.95% of the vote. The next three most popular parties were the SP (20.41%), the FDP (15.01%) and the Green Party (8.7%). In the federal election, a total of 154 votes were cast, and the voter turnout was 48.9%.

== Economy ==
As of 2010, Valeyres-sous-Rances had an unemployment rate of 2.2%. As of 2008, there were 45 people employed in the primary economic sector and about 16 businesses involved in this sector. 46 people were employed in the secondary sector and there were 8 businesses in this sector. 31 people were employed in the tertiary sector, with 14 businesses in this sector. There were 244 residents of the municipality who were employed in some capacity, of which females made up 40.2% of the workforce.

In 2008 the total number of full-time equivalent jobs was 100. The number of jobs in the primary sector was 31, all of which were in agriculture. The number of jobs in the secondary sector was 45 of which 10 or (22.2%) were in manufacturing and 35 (77.8%) were in construction. The number of jobs in the tertiary sector was 24. In the tertiary sector; 4 or 16.7% were in wholesale or retail sales or the repair of motor vehicles, 4 or 16.7% were in a hotel or restaurant, 1 was in the information industry, 5 or 20.8% were technical professionals or scientists, 3 or 12.5% were in education.

In 2000, there were 55 workers who commuted into the municipality and 176 workers who commuted away. The municipality is a net exporter of workers, with about 3.2 workers leaving the municipality for every one entering. About 10.9% of the workforce coming into Valeyres-sous-Rances are coming from outside Switzerland. Of the working population, 9.4% used public transportation to get to work, and 65.6% used a private car.

== Religion ==
From the 2000 census, 98 or 19.7% were Roman Catholic, while 288 or 57.9% belonged to the Swiss Reformed Church. Of the rest of the population, there was 1 member of an Orthodox church, and there were 14 individuals (or about 2.82% of the population) who belonged to another Christian church. There were 1 individual who belonged to another church. 92 (or about 18.51% of the population) belonged to no church, are agnostic or atheist, and 10 individuals (or about 2.01% of the population) did not answer the question.

== Weather ==
Valeyres-sous-Rances has an average of 120 days of rain or snow per year and on average receives 917 mm (36.1 in) of precipitation. The wettest month is December during which time Valeyres-sous-Rances receives an average of 89 mm (3.5 in) of rain or snow. During this month there is precipitation for an average of 10.8 days. The month with the most days of precipitation is May, with an average of 11.8, but with only 80 mm (3.1 in) of rain or snow. The driest month of the year is April with an average of 59 mm (2.3 in) of precipitation over 9.9 days.

== Education ==
In Valeyres-sous-Rances about 191 or (38.4%) of the population have completed non-mandatory upper secondary education, and 48 or (9.7%) have completed additional higher education (either university or a Fachhochschule). Of the 48 who completed tertiary schooling, 52.1% were Swiss men, 25.0% were Swiss women, 14.6% were non-Swiss men.

In the 2009/2010 school year there were a total of 69 students in the Valeyres-sous-Rances school district. In the Vaud cantonal school system, two years of non-obligatory pre-school are provided by the political districts. During the school year, the political district provided pre-school care for a total of 578 children of which 359 children (62.1%) received subsidized pre-school care. The canton's primary school program requires students to attend for four years. There were 23 students in the municipal primary school program. The obligatory lower secondary school program lasts for six years and there were 45 students in those schools. There was also 1 student who was home schooled or attended another non-traditional school.

As of 2000, there were 19 students in Valeyres-sous-Rances who came from another municipality, while 71 residents attended schools outside the municipality.
