= Sergey, Switzerland =

Sergey
- Municipality
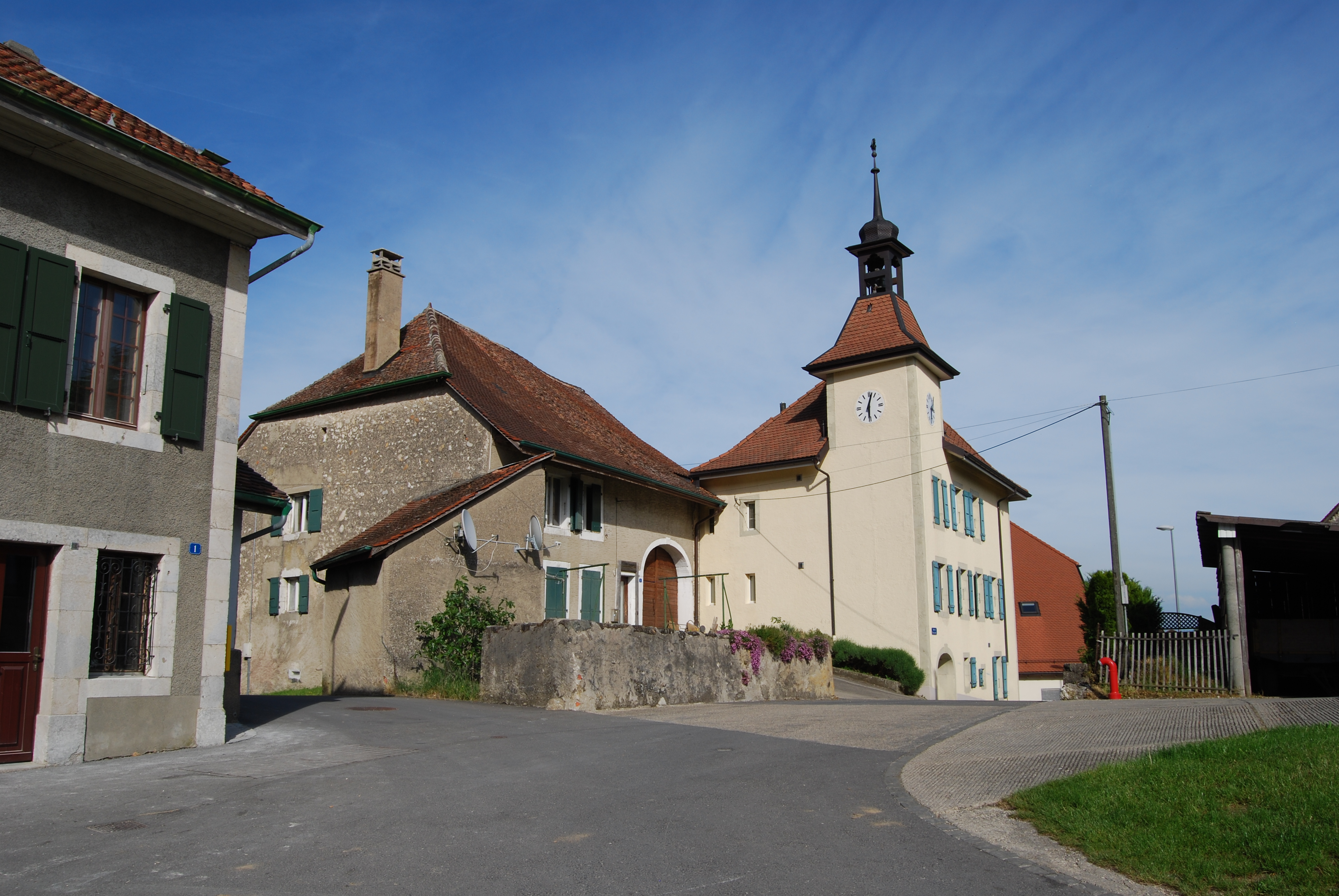

- Flag Coat of arms
- Location of Sergey
- Location within Switzerland Location within Canton of Vaud
- Coordinates: 46°45′N 06°30′E
- Country: Switzerland
- Canton: Vaud
- District: Jura-Nord Vaudois

Government
  - Mayor: Syndic; Suzanne Buffat

Area
  - Total: 1.48 km^{2} (0.57 sq mi)
- Elevation: 613 m (2,011 ft)

Population (2004)
  - Total: 108
  - Density: 73.0/km^{2} (189/sq mi)
- Demonym: Les Ours
- Time zone: UTC+01:00 (CET)
  - Summer (DST): UTC+02:00 (CEST)
- Postal code: 1355
- SFOS number: 5762
- ISO 3166 code: CH-VD
- Surrounded by: Rances, Valeyres-sous-Rances, Montcherand, Les Clées, L'Abergement
- Website: www.sergey.ch

Sergey is a municipality in the district of Jura-Nord Vaudois in the canton of Vaud in Switzerland.

== History ==
Sergey is first mentioned in 1321 as Sergeys.

== Geography ==
Sergey has an area, as of 2009, of 1.5 square kilometers (0.58 mi^{2}). Of this area, 0.98 km^{2} (0.38 mi^{2}) or 67.1% is used for agricultural purposes, while 0.28 km^{2} (0.11 mi^{2}) or 19.2% is forested. Of the rest of the land, 0.21 km^{2} (0.081 mi^{2}) or 14.4% is settled (buildings or roads).

Of the built up area, housing and buildings made up 4.1% and transportation infrastructure made up 4.1%. Power and water infrastructure as well as other special developed areas made up 6.2% of the area. Of the forested land, 16.4% of the total land area is heavily forested and 2.7% is covered with orchards or small clusters of trees. Of the agricultural land, 51.4% is used for growing crops and 15.8% is pastures.

The municipality was part of the Orbe District until it was dissolved on 31 August 2006, and Sergey became part of the new district of Jura-Nord Vaudois.

The municipality is located at the foot of Mont Suchet.

== Coat of arms ==
The blazon of the municipal coat of arms is Per fess: 1. Argent, a Semi-Bear rampant issuant Sable, langued Gules; 2. Pally of Six Argent and Azure

== Demographics ==
Sergey has a population (as of December 2020) of 145. As of 2008, 4.6% of the population are resident foreign nationals. Over the last 10 years (1999–2009 ) the population has changed at a rate of 31.1%. It has changed at a rate of 17.9% due to migration and at a rate of 14.2% due to births and deaths.

Most of the population (as of 2000) speaks French (106 or 98.1%), with German being second most common (1 or 0.9%) and Dutch being third (1 or 0.9%).

The age distribution, as of 2009, in Sergey is; 22 children or 15.8% of the population are between 0 and 9 years old and 17 teenagers or 12.2% are between 10 and 19. Of the adult population, 20 people or 14.4% of the population are between 20 and 29 years old. 23 people or 16.5% are between 30 and 39, 22 people or 15.8% are between 40 and 49, and 14 people or 10.1% are between 50 and 59. The senior population distribution is 13 people or 9.4% of the population are between 60 and 69 years old, 4 people or 2.9% are between 70 and 79, there are 4 people or 2.9% who are between 80 and 89.

As of 2000, there were 42 people who were single and never married in the municipality. There were 52 married individuals, 7 widows or widowers and 7 individuals who are divorced.

As of 2000, there were 38 private households in the municipality, and an average of 2.8 persons per household. There were 6 households that consist of only one person and 5 households with five or more people. Out of a total of 39 households that answered this question, 15.4% were households made up of just one person. Of the rest of the households, there are 11 married couples without children, 18 married couples with children There were 2 single parents with a child or children. There was 1 household that was made up of unrelated people and 1 household that was made up of some sort of institution or another collective housing.

In 2000 there were 17 single family homes (or 58.6% of the total) out of a total of 29 inhabited buildings. There were 4 multi-family buildings (13.8%), along with 7 multi-purpose buildings that were mostly used for housing (24.1%) and 1 other use buildings (commercial or industrial) that also had some housing (3.4%). In 2000, a total of 37 apartments (92.5% of the total) were permanently occupied and 3 apartments (7.5%) were empty. As of 2009, the construction rate of new housing units was 0 new units per 1000 residents. The vacancy rate for the municipality, in 2010, was 0%.

The historical population is given in the following chart:

== Sights ==
The entire hamlet of Sergey is designated as part of the Inventory of Swiss Heritage Sites.

== Politics ==
In the 2015 federal election the most popular party was the SVP which received 59.4% of the vote. The next three most popular parties were the FDP with 13.4%, the SP with 11.1% and the Green Party with 7.3%. In the federal election, a total of 51 votes were cast, and the voter turnout was 52.0%.

== Economy ==
As of 2010, Sergey had an unemployment rate of 4.2%. As of 2008, there were 10 people employed in the primary economic sector and about 4 businesses involved in this sector. No one was employed in the secondary sector. 2 people were employed in the tertiary sector, with 1 business in this sector. There were 51 residents of the municipality who were employed in some capacity, of which females made up 37.3% of the workforce.

In 2008 the total number of full-time equivalent jobs was 9. The number of jobs in the primary sector was 7, all of which were in agriculture. There were no jobs in the secondary sector. The number of jobs in the tertiary sector was 2, both in education.

In 2000, there were 2 workers who commuted into the municipality and 37 workers who commuted away. The municipality is a net exporter of workers, with about 18.5 workers leaving the municipality for every one entering. Of the working population, 9.8% used public transportation to get to work, and 64.7% used a private car.

== Religion ==
From the 2000 census, 12 or 11.1% were Roman Catholic, while 73 or 67.6% belonged to the Swiss Reformed Church. Of the rest of the population, there were 4 individuals (or about 3.70% of the population) who belonged to another Christian church. 19 (or about 17.59% of the population) belonged to no church, are agnostic or atheist, and 1 individuals (or about 0.93% of the population) did not answer the question.

== Education ==
In Sergey about 47 or (43.5%) of the population have completed non-mandatory upper secondary education, and 7 or (6.5%) have completed additional higher education (either university or a Fachhochschule). Of the 7 who completed tertiary schooling, 57.1% were Swiss men, 28.6% were Swiss women.

In the 2009/2010 school year there were a total of 21 students in the Sergey school district. In the Vaud cantonal school system, two years of non-obligatory pre-school are provided by the political districts. During the school year, the political district provided pre-school care for a total of 578 children of which 359 children (62.1%) received subsidized pre-school care. The canton's primary school program requires students to attend for four years. There were 10 students in the municipal primary school program. The obligatory lower secondary school program lasts for six years and there were 11 students in those schools.

As of 2000, there were 12 students in Sergey who came from another municipality, while 18 residents attended schools outside the municipality.
