= Romande Énergie =

Swiss energy company

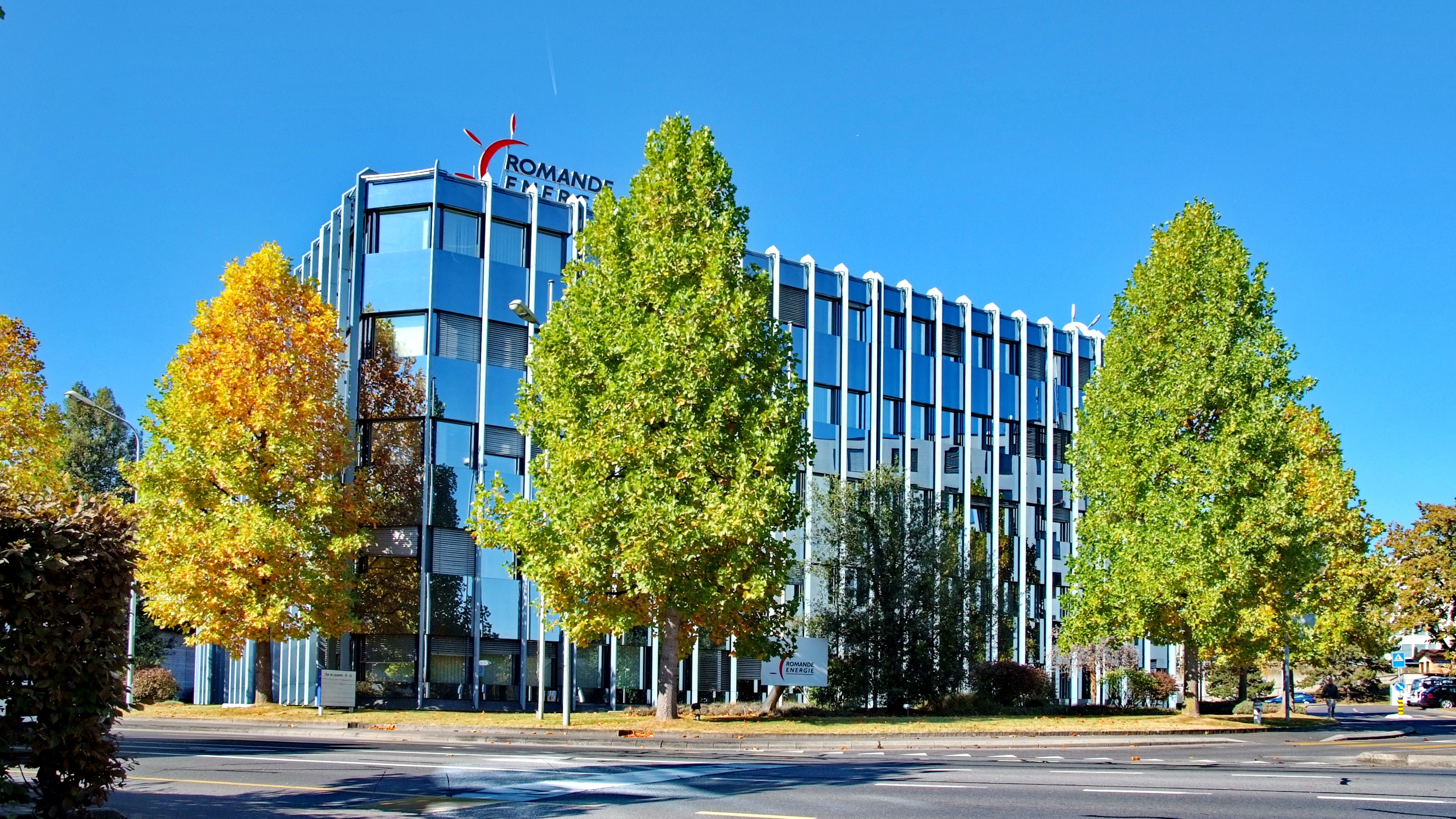
- Native name: Romande Énergie
- Type: S.A.
- Founded: 1997
- Products: Electricity, energy services
- Revenue: 569 292 000 CHF (2020) +9%
- Net income: 86,72 millions CHF (2020) +138%
- Total equity: 1 992 452 kCHF (2020)
- Parent: Romande Energie Holding SA
- Subsidiaries: Romande Energie SA, Romande Energie Commerce SA, Bas-Valais Energie SA, Romande Energie Services SA, Effitec SA, AFCO Management SA, Demierre Deschenaux SA, Centrale thermique de Gland SA, Frigo Service SA, Energie renouvelable de l'Avançon SA, CEVM Compagnie énergétique du Vallon de Morgins SA, Arnon Energie SA, Eoliennes de Provence SA, Romande Energie France SAS, REF Hydro SAS, REF Eolien SAS, Société centrale hydroélectrique de Bar SAS, Calycé 2 SAS, Eole de Piroy Sàrl, Eole de la Joux Sàrl, Eole des Charmes Sàrl, Eole des Muids Sàrl, Eole des Pinceaux Sàrl, Eole des Vignottes Sàrl, Eole du Barrois Sàrl, Souffle d’Espoir SAS, Les Mâts d'Eole SAS, Groupement solaire Cestas 2 SAS, Centrale Solaire Constantin 7 SAS, Centrale solaire Constantin 8 SAS, Centrale solaire Constantin 9 SAS, Centrale solaire Constantin 10 SAS

Romande Énergie is a Swiss energy production, distribution, and marketing company, also active in energy services. Its head office is in Morges, in the canton of Vaud.

The Romande Énergie Group is the result of the 1997 merger of two century-old companies, Société romande d'électricité (SRE), founded in 1904, and Compagnie vaudoise d'électricité (CVE), founded in 1954 and with its origins in Compagnie vaudoise des Forces motrices des lacs de Joux et de l'Orbe, founded in 1901. In 2017, it supplied 2.5 billion kilowatt-hours of electricity a year directly to more than 300,000 private, business, and municipal end customers in French-speaking Switzerland, via its company Romande Énergie Commerce SA. In 2013, it generated 17% of its needs, or 574 million kilowatt-hours per year, exclusively from renewable energies, thanks to its 13 hydroelectric facilities, 9 small hydroelectric facilities, 44 solar photovoltaic facilities and Enerbois, the largest biomass power plant in French-speaking Switzerland. It is an active member of the Association of Swiss Electricity Companies.

The Group is made up of a number of companies, a list of which are directly or indirectly owned by Romande Énergie Holding SA, the holding company listed on the Swiss stock exchange (SIX-Swiss Exchange). In 2014 Romande Énergie Holding SA's largest shareholders were the canton of Vaud and the communes of Vaud.

== History ==
=== Société électrique Vevey-Montreux SA (SEVM) ===
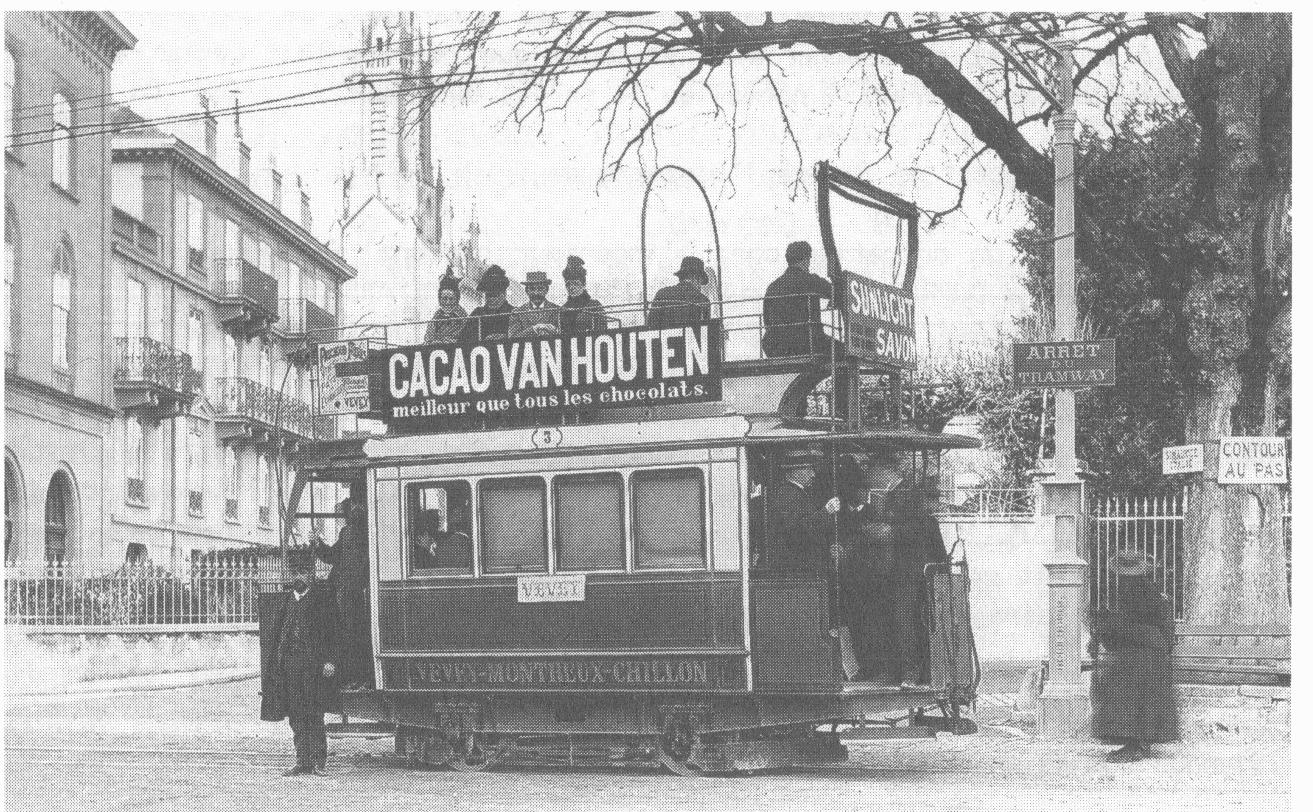
The Vevey-Montreux-Chillon-Villeneuve tramway operated by SEVM.

In 1878, Adolphe Dupraz and Henri Chaudet first applied to the canton for a concession to operate the Baye de Montreux, a stream that flows from the Rochers de Naye to the town of Montreux. The two entrepreneurs wanted to create an electric tramway line between Vevey and Montreux. The line, initially linking Vevey to Chillon and inaugurated on 4 June 1888, would later become the Vevey-Montreux-Chillon-Villeneuve (VMCV).

To power the line, the first power plant was built at Taulan, above Montreux. It was operated by Société électrique Vevey-Montreux SA, also founded in 1886. The following year, the plant produced enough power to install public lighting in the towns of Vevey and Montreux.

In 1888, the Grand Hôtel in Territet became the first public building in French-speaking Switzerland (and the second in the country) to be lit entirely by electricity. Barely two years later, growing demand prompted SEVM to build a new power station near the hamlet of Sonzier, also supplied by the Baye de Montreux, which was diverted into a new reservoir developed for the occasion. In 1898, the SEVM commissioned the Tramway de Trait – Planches.

Meanwhile, a second electric company was founded in Aigle in 1895, the Société des forces motrices de la Grande-Eau (SFMGE), which, as its name suggests, used in particular the waters of the Grande Eau. In 1901, the SFMGE created the Vouvry plant, which used water from Lac de Taney.

Initially competing with each other, the two companies merged on 3 January 1904, to become Société romande d'électricité, a mixed company whose capital of 4.2 million francs was mostly privately owned (including, in particular, industrialist James Edouard Aguet). The new company quickly launched several projects, including the creation of a new plant in Aigle (the future Les Farettes plant) and improvements to those in Vouvry and Taulan.

=== Forces motrices des lacs de Joux et de l'Orbe ===
On 22 May 1901, the Grand Council of the canton of Vaud issued a decree establishing the Compagnie vaudoisedes Forces motrices des lacs de Joux et de l'Orbe (FMJ, colloquially known as "Compagnie de Joux" or "Forces de Joux") with the dual aim of regulating the water levels of Lac de Joux, Lac Brenet and the Orbe, and using these reservoirs to generate and distribute electricity. Two years later, the La Dernier plant was commissioned, followed in 1908 by the Montcherand-sur-Orbe plant. Between them, these plants distributed up to 45 million kWh in 1928 over a large part of Vaud and even part of the canton of Neuchâtel.

Faced with insufficient rainfall during the winter of 1942, the military department imposed restrictions on electricity consumption. The company decided to build a new pumping station to artificially transfer water from Lac de Joux to Lac Brenet, to ensure that the hydraulic plants between the two lakes could operate continuously.

On 28 June 1954, the company was renamed Compagnie vaudoise d'électricité (CVE). Following this name change, the Grand Council renewed the concession for 80 years and added a concession for a new power plant. This new plant, built underground below Lignerolle, was powered by a new dam at Le Day; it was to be known as the Les Clées plant and replaced an earlier plant, commissioned in 1896, which was finally abandoned in 1955.

=== Creation of Romande Énergie ===
As early as 1917, discussions began between the two main electricity production companies in the canton of Vaud (Société romande d'électricité and Compagnie de Joux) to merge the two entities. This first attempt failed a year later when SRE withdrew from the project. In 1919, however, the two companies found themselves both shareholders in the new Énergie Ouest Suisse, created "to ensure the rational and intensive use of the region's hydraulic forces" at the instigation of Jean Landry (who presided over the company from its inception until 1940).

In 1993, SRE was faced with major financial difficulties following real estate transactions linked to one of its subsidiaries (Taulan SA). CVE became the majority shareholder on 14 October, and a process of rapprochement gradually began between the two companies, under the name of the "CVE-SRE Group". As a result of this process, on 24 June 1997, the shareholders of both companies decided to merge under the name of "Romande Énergie SA", with CVE becoming the group's umbrella company; in 2006, it changed its name to Romande Énergie Holding. At the time of the merger, 40% of the new group's capital was held by the canton of Vaud, 30% by the communes of Vaud, and 30% by private shareholders, by the 1951 decree setting out the shares vested in the public authorities.

In 2008, the company divested itself of its public transport activities, with the Vevey-Montreux-Chillon-Villeneuve network now operated by a specially-created public limited company under the same name, whose capital is held by the communes served, the latter transferring their shares in SEVM to the parent company.

== Structure ==
=== Organization and shareholdings ===
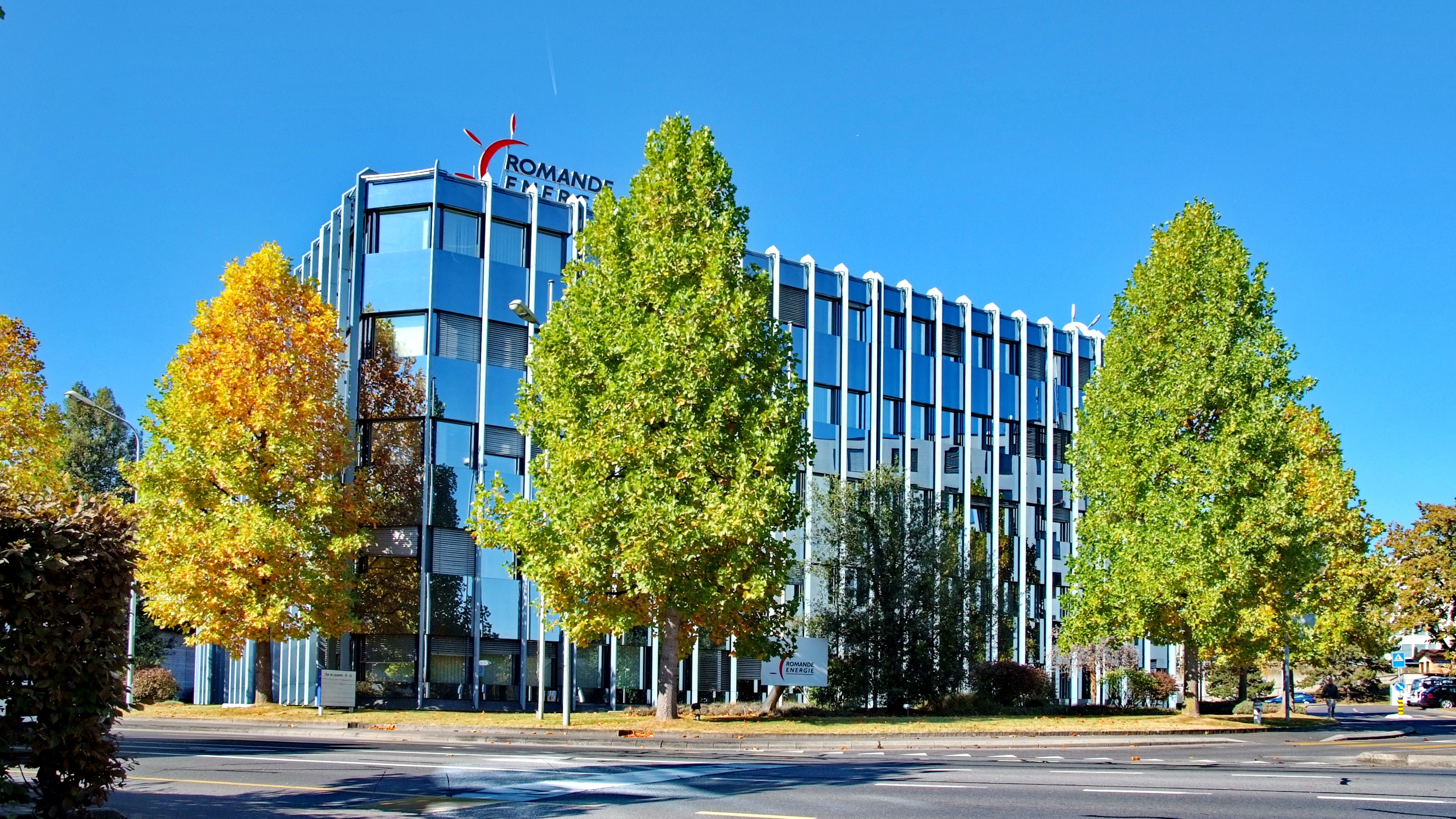
Exterior view of Romande Energie's main building in Morges.

The Romande Énergie Group is headed by Romande Énergie Holding SA (formerly Compagnie vaudoise d'électricité), which owns 100% of Romande Énergie SA (formerly Société romande d'électricité), which "is responsible for all electricity production and distribution activities". The umbrella company also oversees two other companies, Romande Énergie Commerce SA (in charge of electricity sales) and Romande Énergie Services SA (in charge of energy services). Finally, the Group has a centralized internal organization managed by business units (networks and energy) and departments (human resources, finance, communications, and general secretariat).

From 1997 to 1999, the Group was managed by Paul-Daniel Panchaud, until 2004 by Claude Chabanel, and since 1 July 2004 by Pierre-Alain Urech.

On 31 December 2017, the Group held majority stakes (over 50%) in the following companies:

- Romande Énergie Commerce SA;
- Brent Énergie SA and Eoliennes de Provence SA (for Romande Énergie SA);
- Romande Énergie France SAS, Meyronnes SAS, REF Eolien SAS, Effitec SA, Énergie Renouvelable de l'Avançon SA and Bas-Valais Énergie SA (for Romande Énergie Holding SA);
- Neuhaus Énergie SA, PolyTech SA and PolyForce SA (for Romande Énergie Services SA).

It also holds minority stakes in thirty other companies in the energy sector.

=== Shareholding ===
On 31 December 2017, Romande Énergie Holding SA's ordinary share capital consisted of 1,140,000 fully paid-up registered shares with a par value of CHF 25 each. At the same date, the main shareholders were as follows:

Actionnaires	Participation
Canton de Vaud	38.60%
Communes vaudoises	16.22%
Banque cantonale vaudoise	3.05%
Groupe Romande Energie	9.54%
Groupe E	6.07%
Credit Suisse Fondation de placement SA	3.60%
Holdigaz	2.52%

Around 20% of the share capital is open to investors. The share is listed on the Swiss Market Index (symbol REHN, ISIN CH1263676327).

An agreement signed in September 2005 between the canton, the communes, and Banque Cantonale Vaudoise provides for a reciprocal right of first refusal in the event of the sale of shares held by one or other of these parties, who between them hold the majority of the shares. The main aim of this agreement is "to keep the majority of the company's shares in public hands, and thus consolidate its position in the French-speaking part of Switzerland's electricity market".

== Activities ==
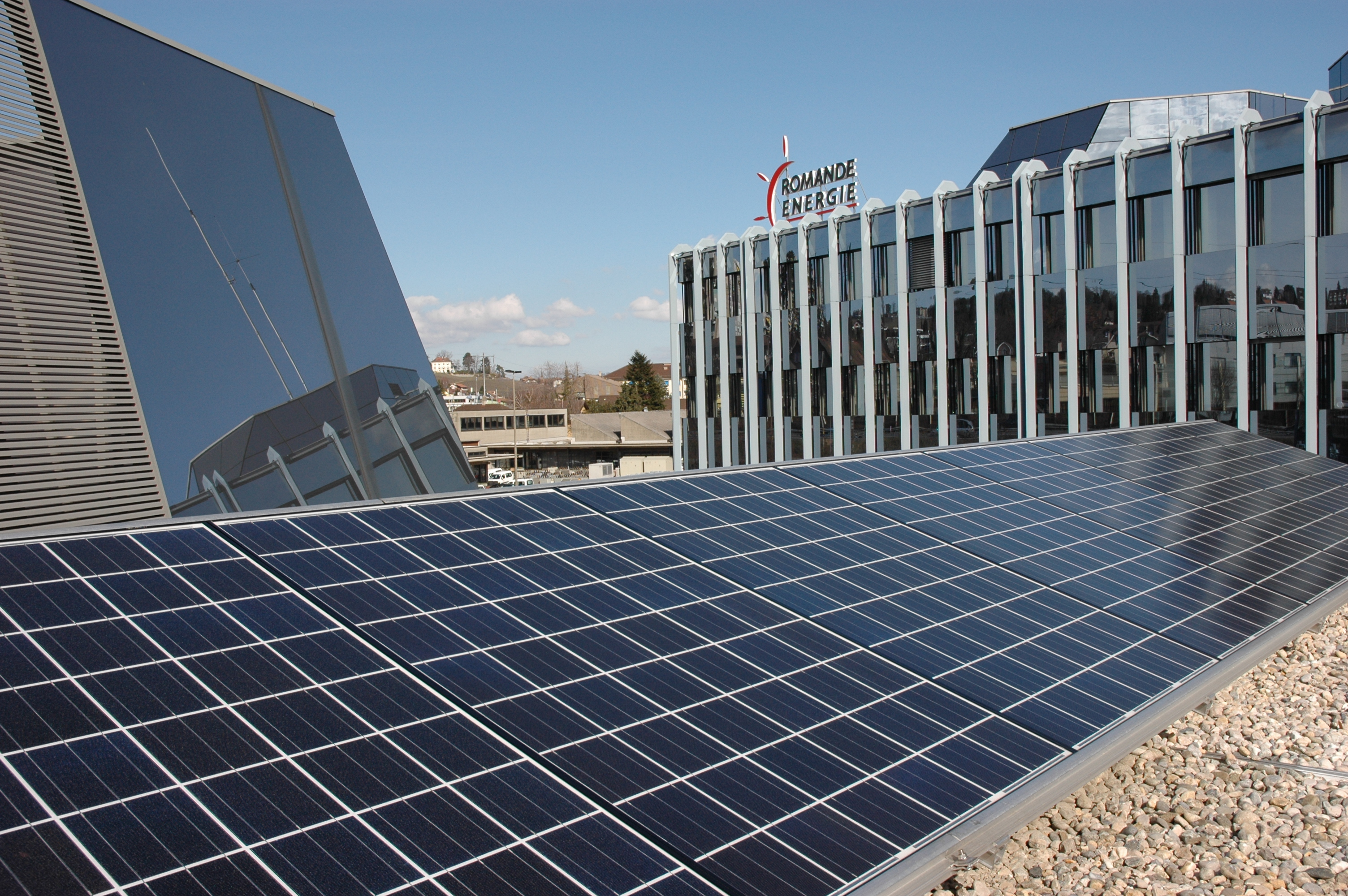
Solar panels on the roof of the Morges building.

=== Electricity generation ===
In 2017, the Group generated 12.9% of its electricity needs, with 510 million kWh per year from renewable energies (solar, hydro, wind and biomass). Various projects to increase this share are under consideration, such as the development of wind power and geothermal energy, as well as the acquisition of stakes in natural gas-fired power plants. The latter option, which "could [...] be essential to ensure the country's supply during a transitional period", was put on hold following the presentation of the interim balance sheet in September 2014.

The Group also purchases electricity from other generating companies, including Alpiq. The development of new renewable energy production sites is based on partnerships with companies and municipalities that make their sites or roofs available to Romande Énergie, which finances, builds, and manages the production facility.

=== Electricity distribution ===
In 2017, Romande Énergie's network comprised 45 substations, 3,100 transformer stations, and 10,000 km of power lines, 85% of which are underground.

Romande Énergie is one of the founders of the Smart grid Suisse association, whose aim is to "facilitate and lead the introduction" of smart grids in Switzerland.

=== Electricity sales ===
Through its company Romande Énergie Commerce (whose shareholders, in addition to the Romande ÉnergieGroup, are SIE SA (service intercommunal de l'électricité, based in Renens), Bas-Valais Énergie SA, Bussigny-près-Lausanne, Pully, Romanel-sur-Lausanne, Belmont-sur-Lausanne and Paudex and, later, Forces motrices de l'Avançon), the Group sells 2.5 billion kWh (2017) of electricity to more than 300,000 end customers in nearly 300 communes in the cantons of Vaud, Valais, Fribourg and Geneva, but also, since the opening of the electricity market for large customers in 2009 throughout Switzerland.

In December 2013, the Group introduced a new type of electricity supply contract (called "Contrats Énergies Libres") which, among other things, makes it possible to identify and guarantee the provenance and geographical origin of the electricity fed into the grid; In 2018, the products offered are entitled "Terre suisse" (100% Swiss-sourced energy, containing 100% hydropower), "Terre romande" (100% French-speaking Swiss-sourced energy certified as 100% hydropower), "Terre d'Ici" (100% renewable energy with 50% hydropower and 50% locally-produced solar power) and "Standard" (100% Swiss-sourced energy with no guarantee of the means of production). When this contract was introduced, the Fédération romande des consommateurs (French-speaking consumers' federation) received complaints from "numerous consumers" who did not accept the use of an "opt-out" system in which customers who did not make themselves known could see "their contract modified towards a more expensive offer than the standard tariff".

== Production sites ==
As of March 2018, Romande Énergie owns 111 energy production sites:

- 65 solar farms;
- 33 hydropower plants;
- 9 district heating plants;
- 2 biomass plants: one for dry biomass (Enerbois plant in Rueyres) and one for fermentable biomass (Agrogaz plant in Lignerolle);
- 2 wind farms (in France).

=== Hydroelectric power stations ===
The Les Clées hydroelectric power station in Ballaigues was built in 1955 on the Orbe River. It is the most powerful of Romande Énergie's hydroelectric facilities. Free guided tours are organized.

The Farettes hydroelectric power station in Aigle underwent major work between 2013 and 2015, budgeted at 80 million Swiss francs. The aim is to replace the penstock and the two turbines and to drill a new water intake gallery. The project will increase production potential by 70% to 86 million kWh per year. The project is based on work carried out by the Mhylab Foundation, set up in the 1980s by a group of researchers with the aim of providing concrete, laboratory-tested solutions for builders of small hydroelectric power plants.

=== Small hydropower plants ===
In 2014, Romande Énergie owned, either wholly or in partnership, 9 small hydropower plants. Among these, the two turbines of the Brent power plant in Montreux, built in 1912, were purchased by the Group in 2008. Work carried out between June 2013 and November 2014 increased the plant's capacity from 145,000 to 380,000 kWh per year with a single new turbine. To modernize the Forestay power plant and increase the waterfall operated from 60 to 183 meters, the water catchment, was moved in 2013 to Chexbres; this power plant, commissioned in 2014, produces 2.6 million kWh per year.

=== Renewable energies ===
In its 2013 management report, the Romande Énergie Group plans to invest almost 1 billion Swiss francs by 2025 to expand its energy production. This production, which is to be essentially of renewable origin, will eventually represent 1,655 million kWh, distributed as follows:

- Hydropower: 650 million kWh (450 million kWh generated in 2013)
- Small hydropower: 100 million kWh (15 million kWh generated in 2013)
- Biomass energy: 30 million kWh (25 million kWh generated in 2013)
- Solar energy: 65 million kWh (10 million kWh generated in 2013)
- Wind power: 800 million kWh
- Geothermal energy: 10 million kWh

=== EPFL glazing ===
In 2013, the Romande Énergie Group supported the installation of 300 m2 of translucent, colored photovoltaic panels (developed in 1991 by researcher Michael Grätzel) on the west facade of the Swiss Tech Convention Center, the new conference center of the École Polytechnique Fédérale de Lausanne (EPFL). The panels come in 5 different shades of red, green, and orange, and were installed according to a concept developed by artists Daniel Schlaepfer and Catherine Bolle. Entirely financed by the Romande Énergie group, this solar installation is described as "a world first for a public building".

=== Romande Énergie Solar Park – EPFL ===
On 19 May 2015, the Parc solaire Romande Énergie – EPFL was inaugurated, the largest urban solar park in Switzerland, with 9,000 solar panels installed on 15,500 m^{2} on the site of the École Polytechnique Fédérale de Lausanne. The park, which costs CHF 15 million (financed entirely by Romande Énergie), supplies 2.2 million kWh per year, or 2% of the school's electricity consumption.

The partnership between the company and the school also includes a share of research into photovoltaics and its applications. The facility features several technological innovations, including Grätzel cells, flexible panels for use on curved roofs, and vertical panels for building facades.

== Commitment and sponsorship ==
The Romande Énergie Group supports numerous initiatives in the field of research and development, particularly in connection with solar energy and energy efficiency.

=== "Volteface" project ===
Romande Énergie and the University of Lausanne have joined forces in a project entitled "Volteface", which takes the form of a research platform ’on the behavioral, institutional, economic, territorial or governance changes that are required" as part of the energy transition. This project, co-financed by the canton of Vaud as part of the "100 million for renewable energies and energy efficiency" program, will be carried out in several stages: firstly, defining the current situation, developing the research themes between 2014 and 2016, and finally presenting the results of the research carried out at the end of 2017.

=== The Romande Énergie Lab at EPFL ===
A new Romande Énergie competence center on the EPFL campus in Lausanne, the Smart Lab functions as an incubator for all opportunities relating to the valorization of energy data. Its activities focus on development related to the connected home and building, as well as the smart grid of tomorrow.

=== "Energy Explorers" program ===
In 2004, Romande Énergie launched an edutainment program called "Les Explorateurs de l'Énergie". This program, whose aim is "to raise children's awareness of the importance of energy and environmental issues in a fun way", is carried out in partnership with UNESCO and the International Polar Foundation. It is aimed at children aged between 10 and 12, and features an annual competition for 8th-grade HarmoS classes throughout French-speaking Switzerland.

=== Awareness-raising tools ===
Romande Énergie is developing various services to help its customers optimize their energy consumption. These include the DÉCLICS participative platform, an “eco-comparator” launched in partnership with Topten, the possibility for the company's customers to track their energy consumption online, and the Energybox platform, which offers tests to assess and improve energy efficiency.

== Visual identity ==
On several occasions, Romande Énergie installs advertising livery on several railcars on the Lausanne-Echallens-Bercher line. The Be 4/8 No. 36 railcar carried several advertisements for Romande Énergie. The same is true of the RBe 4/8 No. 46 multiple units.

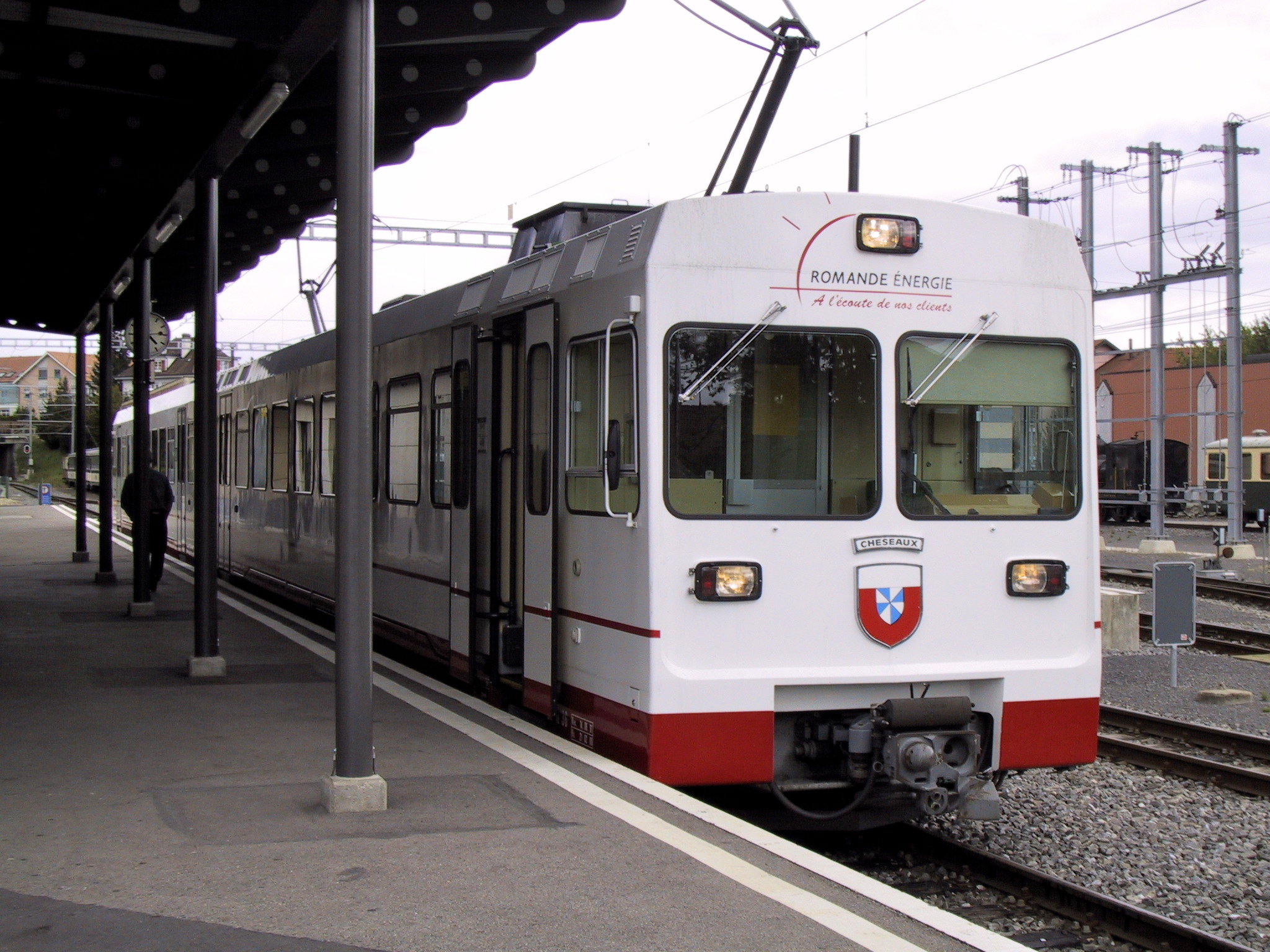
Be 4/8 36 in 2000 at Echallens station.

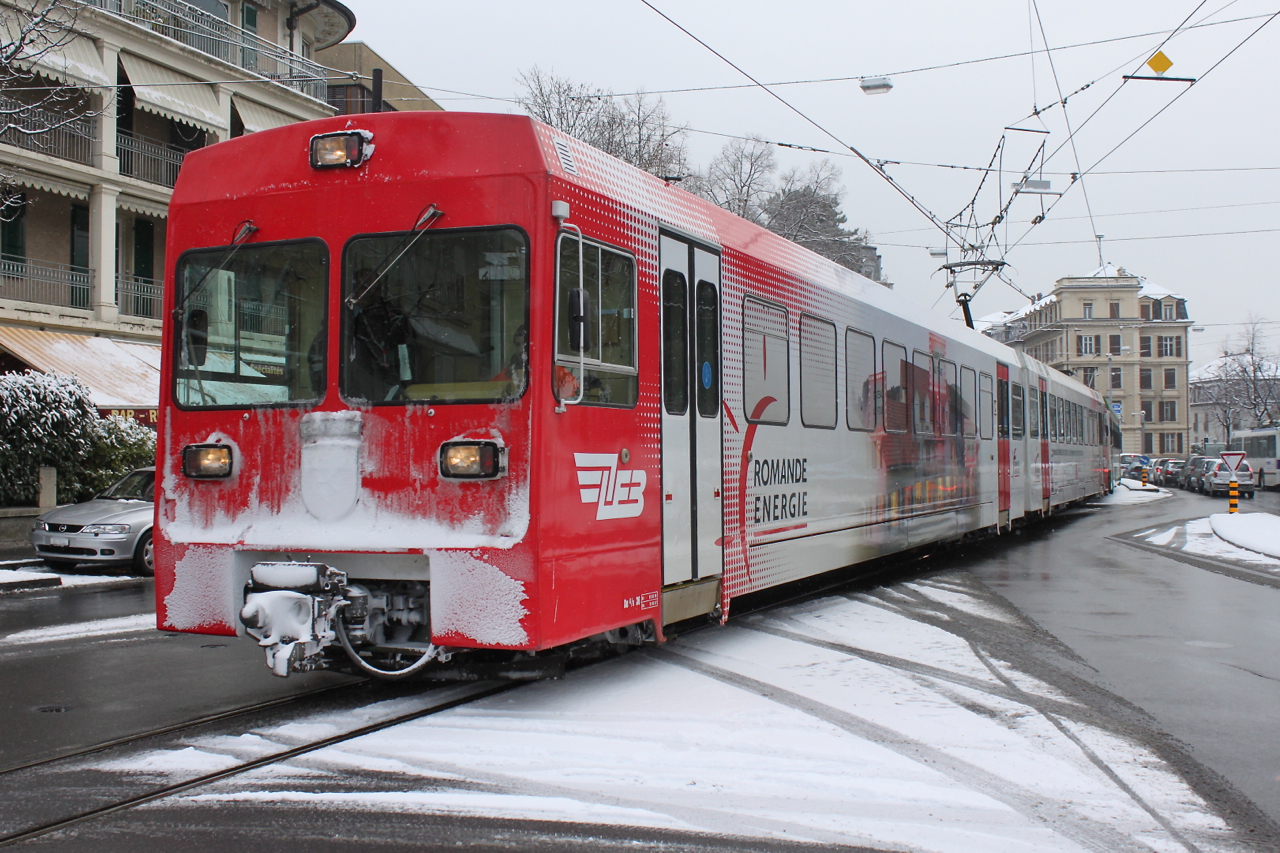
Be 4/8 36 in 2009 arriving at Montétan station.

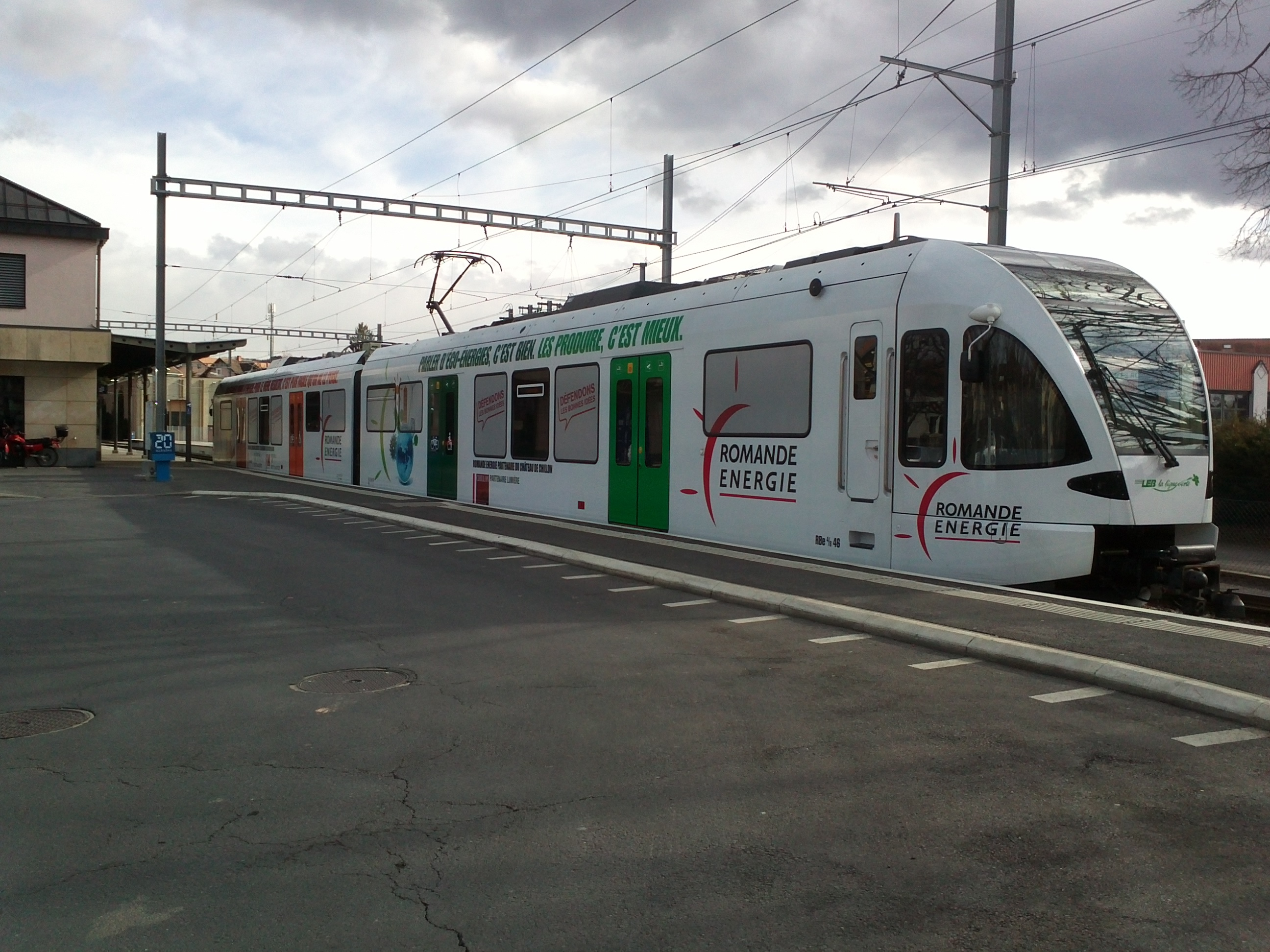
RBe 4/8 46 in 2012 at Echallens station.
