= Rochefort-sur-Nenon =

Commune in Bourgogne-Franche-Comté, France

- Commune
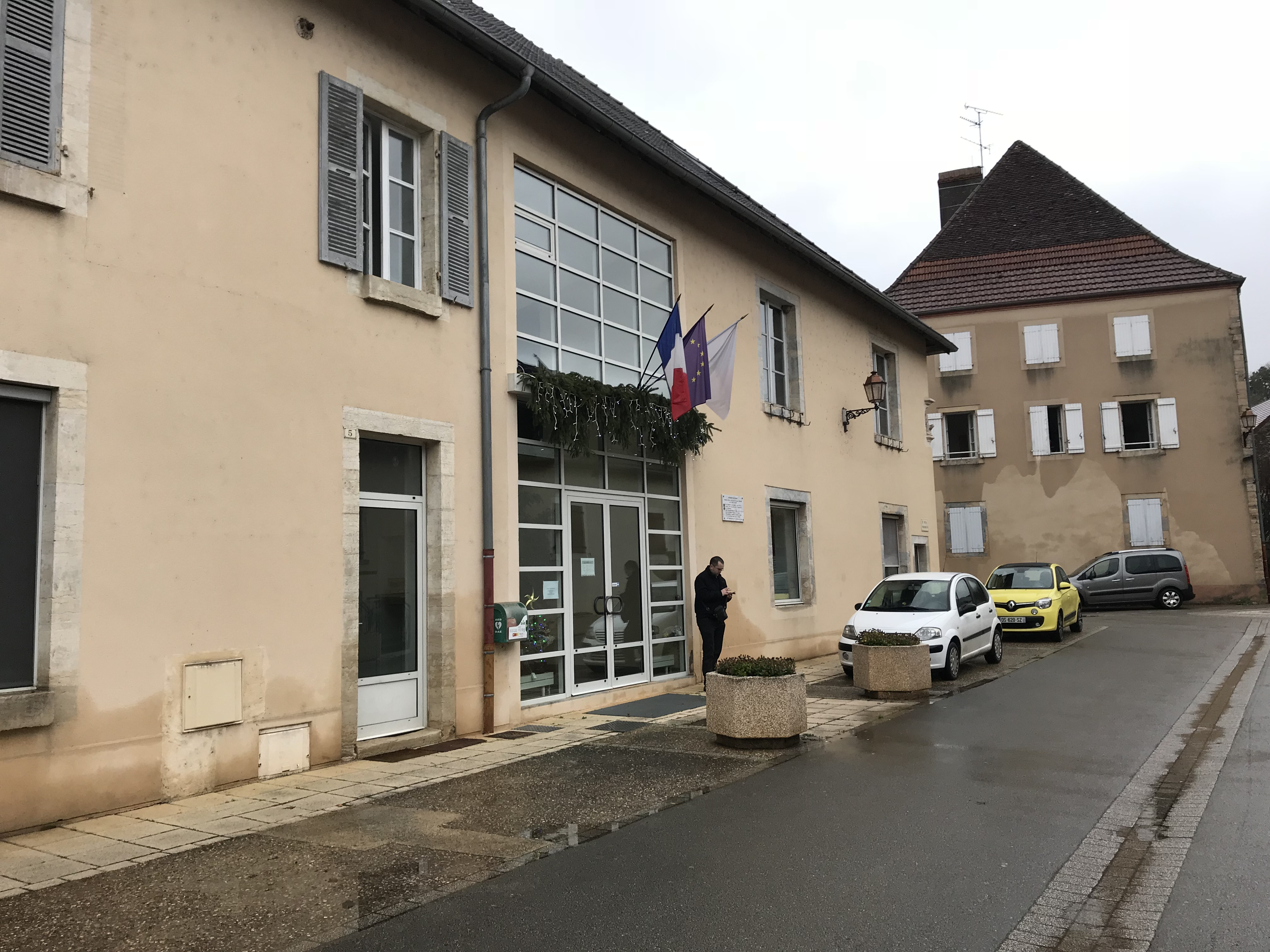
- The town hall in Rochefort-sur-Nenon

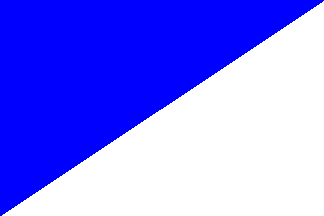
- Flag Coat of arms
- Location of Rochefort-sur-Nenon
- Location within France Location within Bourgogne-Franche-Comté
- Coordinates: 47°07′35″N 5°33′43″E
- Country: France
- Region: Bourgogne-Franche-Comté
- Department: Jura
- Arrondissement: Dole
- Canton: Authume
- Intercommunality: CA Grand Dole

Government
  - Mayor (2020–2026): Gérard Fernoux-Coutenet
- Area^{1}: 10.20 km^{2} (3.94 sq mi)
- Highest elevation: 256 m (840 ft)
- Lowest elevation: 201 m (659 ft)
- Population (2023): 700
  - Density: 69/km^{2} (180/sq mi)
- Time zone: UTC+01:00 (CET)
  - Summer (DST): UTC+02:00 (CEST)
- INSEE/Postal code: 39462 /39700
- ^{1} French Land Register data, which excludes lakes, ponds, glaciers > 1 km^{2} (0.386 sq mi or 247 acres) and river estuaries.

Rochefort-sur-Nenon (French pronunciation: [ʁɔʃfɔʁ syʁ nənɔ̃], literally Rochefort on Nenon) is a commune in the Jura department in the region of Bourgogne-Franche-Comté in eastern France.

== Population ==
Historical population
Year	Pop.	±% p.a.
1968	294	—
1975	286	−0.39%
1982	387	+4.42%
1990	599	+5.61%
1999	641	+0.76%
2007	580	−1.24%
2012	567	−0.45%
2017	679	+3.67%
2023	700	+0.51%
Source: INSEE

== See also ==
- Communes of the Jura department
