= Les Clées Castle =

Castle in Les Clées, Switzerland

- Les Clées in Switzerland
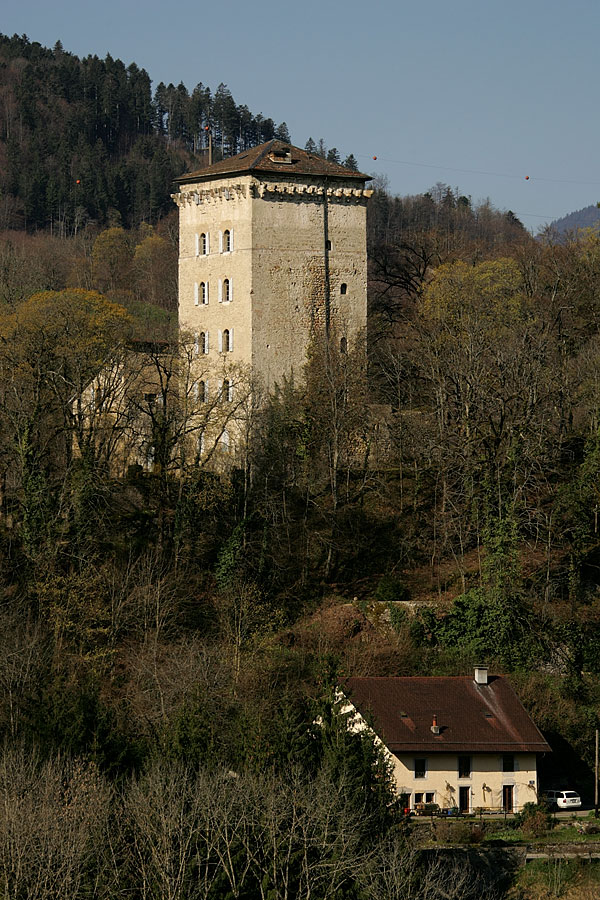
- Les Clées Castle

Site information
- Type: Castle

Location
- Coordinates: 46°43′51″N 6°27′46″E

Swiss Cultural Property of National Significance

Les Clées Castle is a castle in the municipality of Les Clées of the Canton of Vaud in Switzerland. It is a Swiss heritage site of national significance.

== See also ==
- List of castles in Switzerland
- Château
