= Ballaigues =

- Municipality
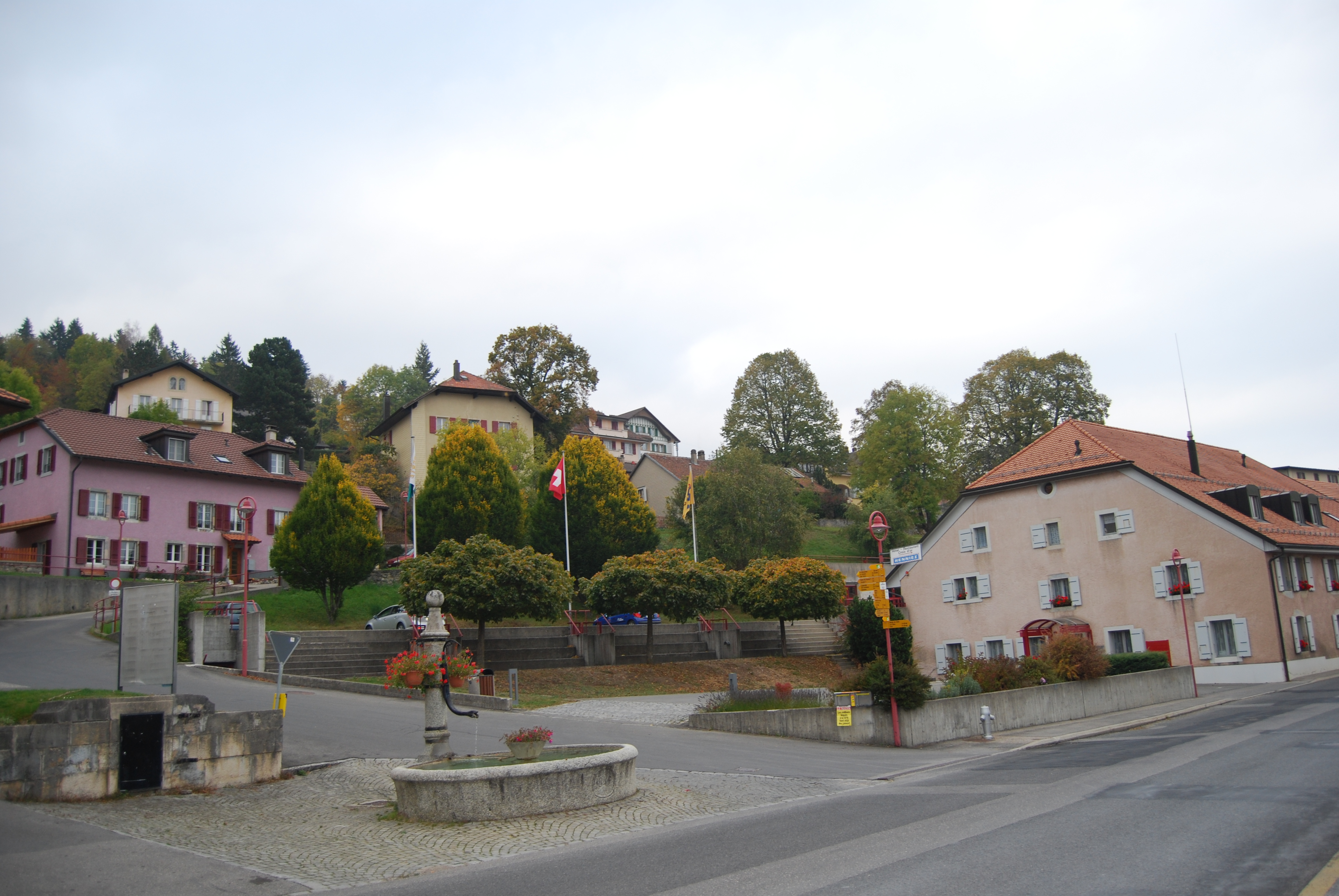
- Ballaigues village

- Flag Coat of arms
- Location of Ballaigues
- Location within Switzerland Location within Canton of Vaud
- Coordinates: 46°44′N 06°25′E
- Country: Switzerland
- Canton: Vaud
- District: Jura-Nord Vaudois

Government
  - Mayor: Syndic; Raphaël Darbellay

Area
  - Total: 9.04 km^{2} (3.49 sq mi)
- Elevation: 865 m (2,838 ft)

Population (2004)
  - Total: 867
  - Density: 95.9/km^{2} (248/sq mi)
- Demonym(s): Les Ballaiguis; Les Anes
- Time zone: UTC+01:00 (CET)
  - Summer (DST): UTC+02:00 (CEST)
- Postal code: 1338
- SFOS number: 5744
- ISO 3166 code: CH-VD
- Surrounded by: Jougne (FR-25), Lignerolle, Vallorbe, Les Clées
- Website: www.ballaigues.ch

Ballaigues (French pronunciation: [balɛɡ]) is a municipality in the district of Jura-Nord Vaudois in the canton of Vaud in Switzerland.

== History ==
Ballaigues is first mentioned in 1228 as Balevui. In 1453 it was mentioned as Bella Aqua.

== Geography ==
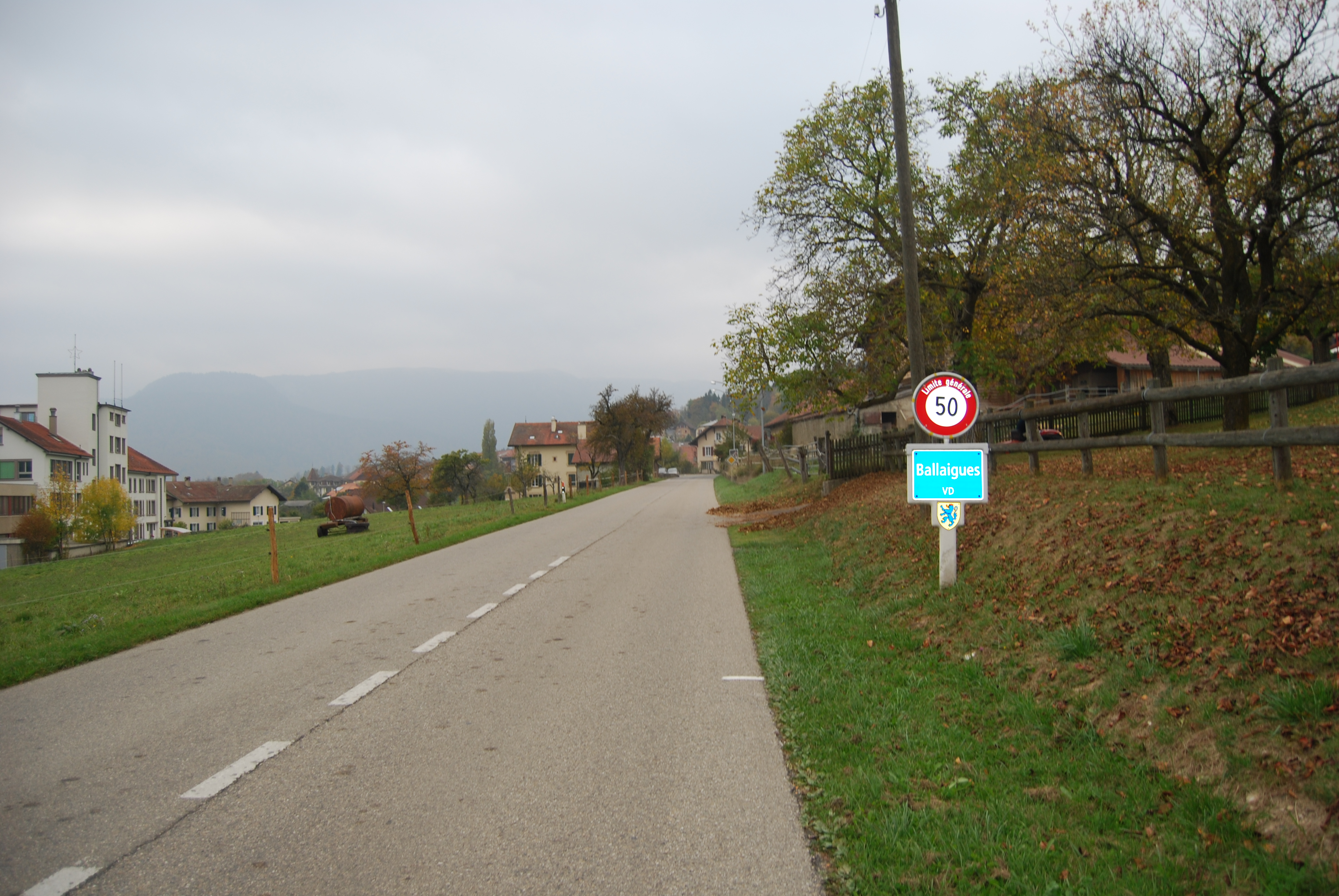
Sign at the entrance to the village

Aerial view from Walter Mittelholzer (1931)

Ballaigues has an area, as of 2009, of 9 square kilometers (3.5 mi^{2}). Of this area, 3.61 km^{2} (1.39 mi^{2}) or 40.0% is used for agricultural purposes, while 4.48 km^{2} (1.73 mi^{2}) or 49.6% is forested. Of the rest of the land, 0.91 km^{2} (0.35 mi^{2}) or 10.1% is settled (buildings or roads), 0.05 km^{2} (12 acres) or 0.6% is either rivers or lakes.

Of the built up area, housing and buildings made up 4.2% and transportation infrastructure made up 4.9%. Out of the forested land, 46.6% of the total land area is heavily forested and 3.0% is covered with orchards or small clusters of trees. Of the agricultural land, 0.7% is used for growing crops and 33.0% is pastures and 5.9% is used for alpine pastures. Of the water in the municipality, 0.2% is in lakes and 0.3% is in rivers and streams.

The municipality was part of the Orbe District until it was dissolved on 31 August 2006, and Ballaigues became part of the new district of Jura-Nord Vaudois.

The municipality is located on the southern slope of the Suchet, on the French-Swiss border. It consists of the village of Ballaigues and a number of hamlets.

== Coat of arms ==
The blazon of the municipal coat of arms is Or, a lion rampant Azure, langued and crowned Gules.

== Demographics ==
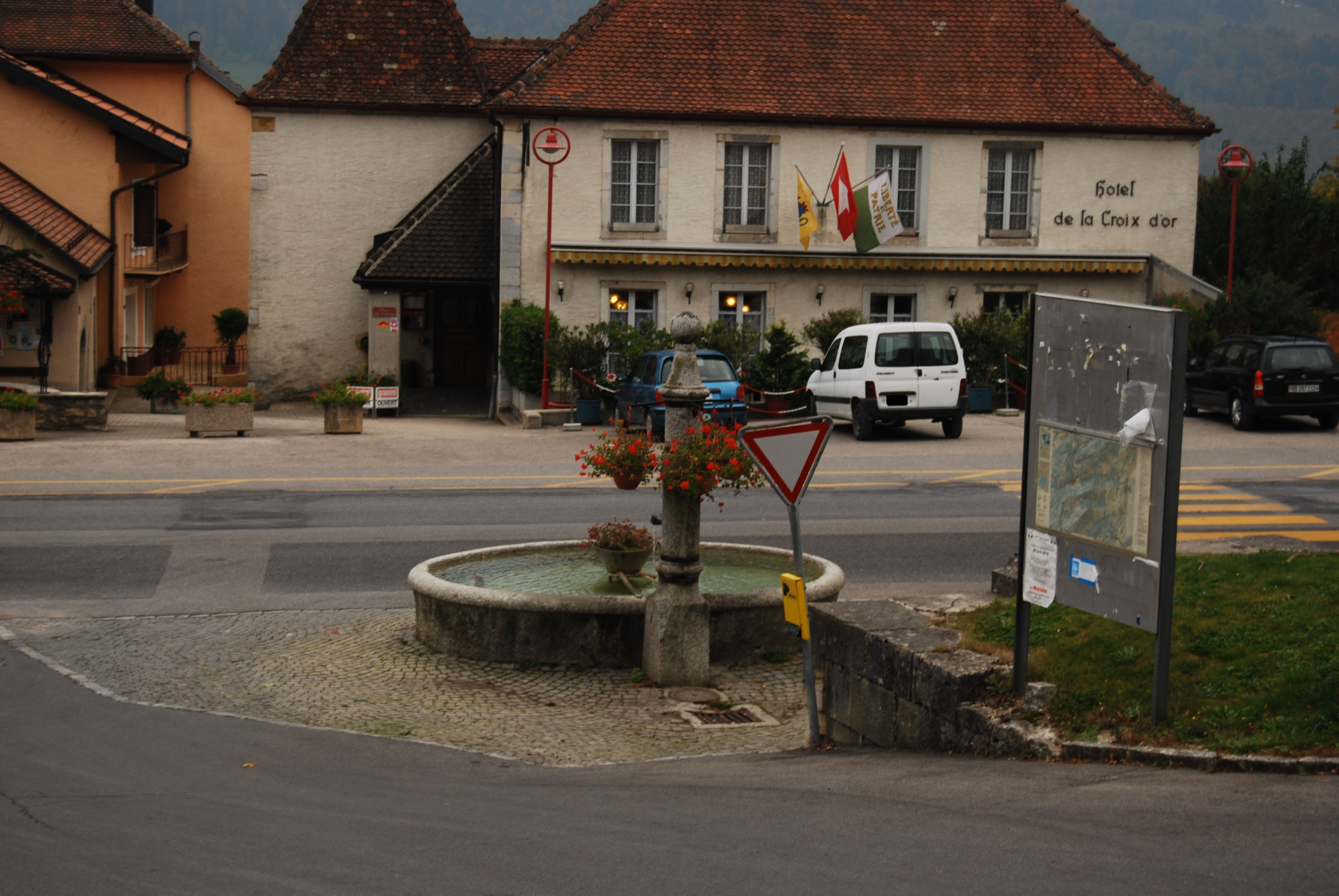
Fountain and Hotel in Ballaigues

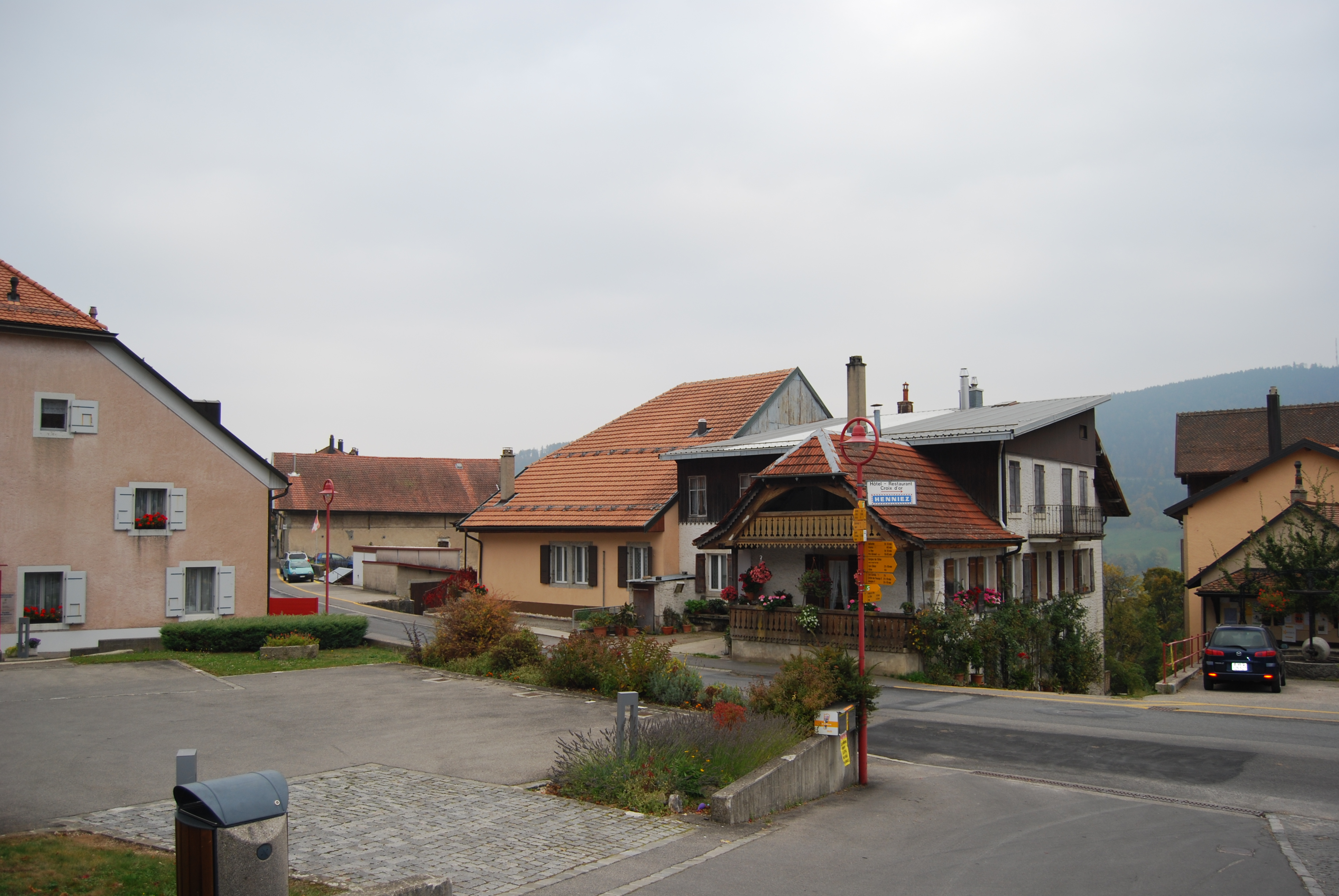
Buildings in Ballaigues

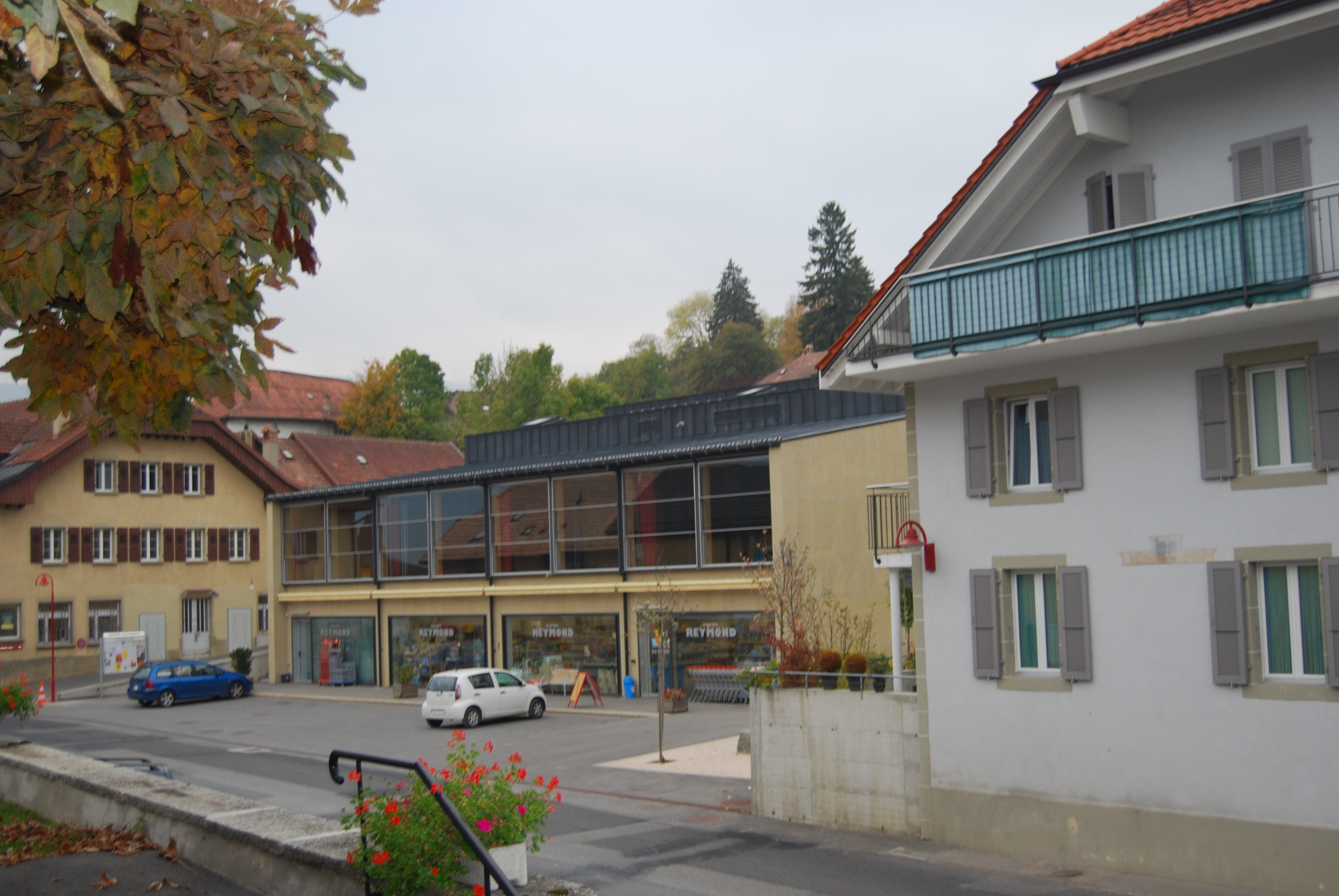
Market in Ballaigues

Ballaigues has a population (as of December 2020) of 1,144. As of 2008, 9.9% of the population are resident foreign nationals. Over the last 10 years (1999–2009 ) the population has changed at a rate of 2.6%. It has changed at a rate of 6.5% due to migration and at a rate of -3.9% due to births and deaths.

Most of the population (as of 2000) speaks French (808 or 92.8%), with Italian being second most common (22 or 2.5%) and German being third (19 or 2.2%).

The age distribution, as of 2009, in Ballaigues is; 76 children or 8.5% of the population are between 0 and 9 years old and 116 teenagers or 12.9% are between 10 and 19. Of the adult population, 108 people or 12.1% of the population are between 20 and 29 years old. 102 people or 11.4% are between 30 and 39, 134 people or 15.0% are between 40 and 49, and 106 people or 11.8% are between 50 and 59. The senior population distribution is 126 people or 14.1% of the population are between 60 and 69 years old, 82 people or 9.2% are between 70 and 79, there are 39 people or 4.4% who are between 80 and 89, and there are 7 people or 0.8% who are 90 and older.

As of 2000, there were 327 people who were single and never married in the municipality. There were 450 married individuals, 59 widows or widowers and 35 individuals who are divorced.

As of 2000, there were 343 private households in the municipality, and an average of 2.4 persons per household. There were 90 households that consist of only one person and 31 households with five or more people. Out of a total of 348 households that answered this question, 25.9% were households made up of just one person and there was 1 adult who lived with their parents. Of the rest of the households, there are 126 married couples without children, 111 married couples with children There were 12 single parents with a child or children. There were 3 households that were made up of unrelated people and 5 households that were made up of some sort of institution or another collective housing.

In 2000 there were 99 single family homes (or 47.8% of the total) out of a total of 207 inhabited buildings. There were 59 multi-family buildings (28.5%), along with 35 multi-purpose buildings that were mostly used for housing (16.9%) and 14 other use buildings (commercial or industrial) that also had some housing (6.8%).

In 2000, a total of 341 apartments (85.7% of the total) were permanently occupied, while 36 apartments (9.0%) were seasonally occupied and 21 apartments (5.3%) were empty. As of 2009, the construction rate of new housing units was 0 new units per 1000 residents. The vacancy rate for the municipality, in 2010, was 0.65%.

The historical population is given in the following chart:

== Politics ==
In the 2007 federal election the most popular party was the SVP which received 27.92% of the vote. The next three most popular parties were the SP (21.06%), the FDP (11.47%) and the EDU Party (9.19%). In the federal election, a total of 290 votes were cast, and the voter turnout was 45.7%.

== Economy ==
As of 2010, Ballaigues had an unemployment rate of 5.1%. As of 2008, there were 35 people employed in the primary economic sector and about 11 businesses involved in this sector. 656 people were employed in the secondary sector and there were 16 businesses in this sector. 227 people were employed in the tertiary sector, with 21 businesses in this sector. There were 420 residents of the municipality who were employed in some capacity, of which females made up 41.9% of the workforce.

In 2008 the total number of full-time equivalent jobs was 843. The number of jobs in the primary sector was 24, all of which were in agriculture. The number of jobs in the secondary sector was 632 of which 612 or (96.8%) were in manufacturing and 20 (3.2%) were in construction. The number of jobs in the tertiary sector was 187. In the tertiary sector; 6 or 3.2% were in wholesale or retail sales or the repair of motor vehicles, 1 was in the movement and storage of goods, 12 or 6.4% were in a hotel or restaurant, 1 was in the information industry, 1 was the insurance or financial industry, 108 or 57.8% were technical professionals or scientists, 8 or 4.3% were in education and 45 or 24.1% were in health care.

In 2000, there were 783 workers who commuted into the municipality and 205 workers who commuted away. The municipality is a net importer of workers, with about 3.8 workers entering the municipality for every one leaving. About 35.8% of the workforce coming into Ballaigues are coming from outside Switzerland. Of the working population, 4.5% used public transportation to get to work, and 63.6% used a private car.

== Religion ==
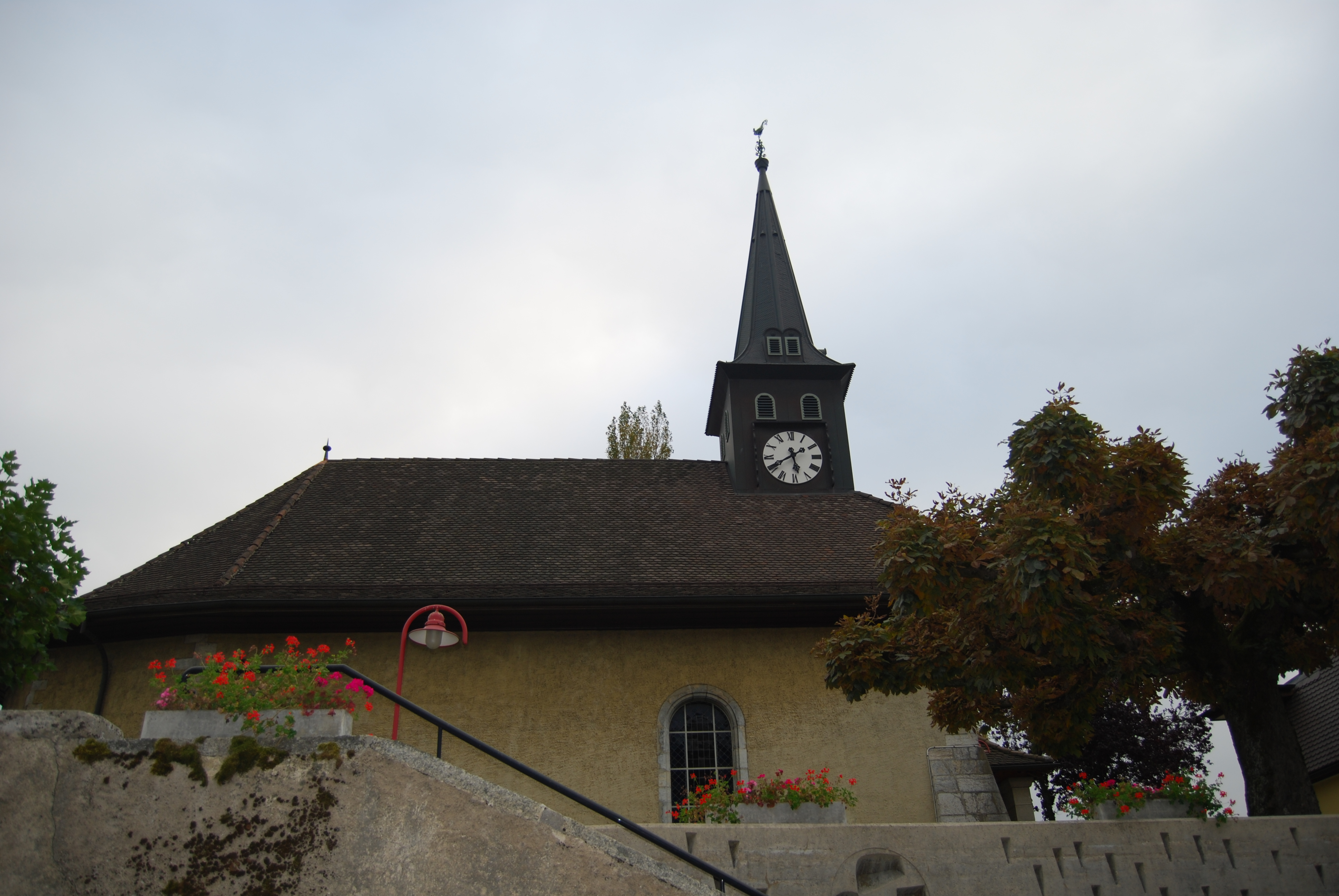
Church in Ballaigues

From the 2000 census, 177 or 20.3% were Roman Catholic, while 463 or 53.2% belonged to the Swiss Reformed Church. Of the rest of the population, there were 2 members of an Orthodox church (or about 0.23% of the population), and there were 174 individuals (or about 19.98% of the population) who belonged to another Christian church. There was 1 individual who was Jewish, and 7 (or about 0.80% of the population) who were Islamic. There were 2 individuals who belonged to another church. 92 (or about 10.56% of the population) belonged to no church, are agnostic or atheist, and 34 individuals (or about 3.90% of the population) did not answer the question.

== Education ==
In Ballaigues about 334 or (38.3%) of the population have completed non-mandatory upper secondary education, and 87 or (10.0%) have completed additional higher education (either university or a Fachhochschule). Of the 87 who completed tertiary schooling, 63.2% were Swiss men, 21.8% were Swiss women, 9.2% were non-Swiss men and 5.7% were non-Swiss women.

In the 2009/2010 school year there were a total of 123 students in the Ballaigues school district. In the Vaud cantonal school system, two years of non-obligatory pre-school are provided by the political districts. During the school year, the political district provided pre-school care for a total of 578 children of which 359 children (62.1%) received subsidized pre-school care. The canton's primary school program requires students to attend for four years. There were 67 students in the municipal primary school program. The obligatory lower secondary school program lasts for six years and there were 53 students in those schools. There were also 3 students who were home schooled or attended another non-traditional school.

As of 2000, there were 23 students in Ballaigues who came from another municipality, while 93 residents attended schools outside the municipality.
