= Éclans-Nenon =

Commune in Bourgogne-Franche-Comté, France

- Commune
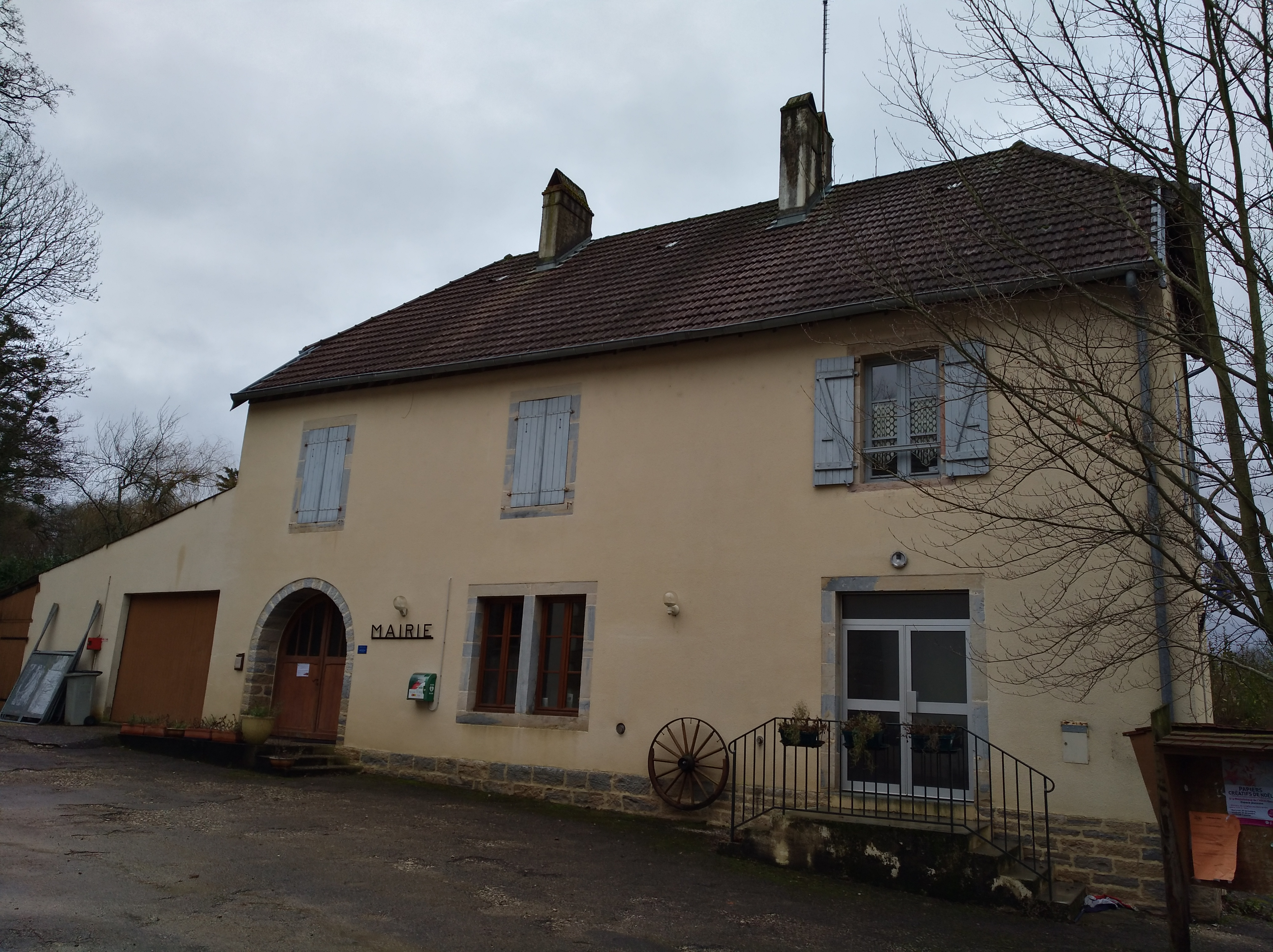
- The town hall in Éclans-Nenon
- Location of Éclans-Nenon
- Location within France Location within Bourgogne-Franche-Comté
- Coordinates: 47°07′31″N 5°36′17″E
- Country: France
- Region: Bourgogne-Franche-Comté
- Department: Jura
- Arrondissement: Dole
- Canton: Authume
- Intercommunality: CA Grand Dole

Government
  - Mayor (2022–2026): Gabriel Bremond
- Area^{1}: 25.83 km^{2} (9.97 sq mi)
- Highest elevation: 261 m (856 ft)
- Lowest elevation: 205 m (673 ft)
- Population (2023): 371
  - Density: 14.4/km^{2} (37.2/sq mi)
- Time zone: UTC+01:00 (CET)
  - Summer (DST): UTC+02:00 (CEST)
- INSEE/Postal code: 39205 /39700
- ^{1} French Land Register data, which excludes lakes, ponds, glaciers > 1 km^{2} (0.386 sq mi or 247 acres) and river estuaries.

Éclans-Nenon (French pronunciation: [eklɑ̃ nənɔ̃]) is a commune in the Jura department of Bourgogne-Franche-Comté in eastern France.

== Population ==
Historical population
Year	Pop.	±% p.a.
1968	180	—
1975	198	+1.37%
1982	222	+1.65%
1990	329	+5.04%
1999	383	+1.70%
2007	404	+0.67%
2012	399	−0.25%
2017	387	−0.61%
2023	371	−0.70%
Source: INSEE

== See also ==
- Communes of the Jura department
