= Lignerolle =

- Municipality
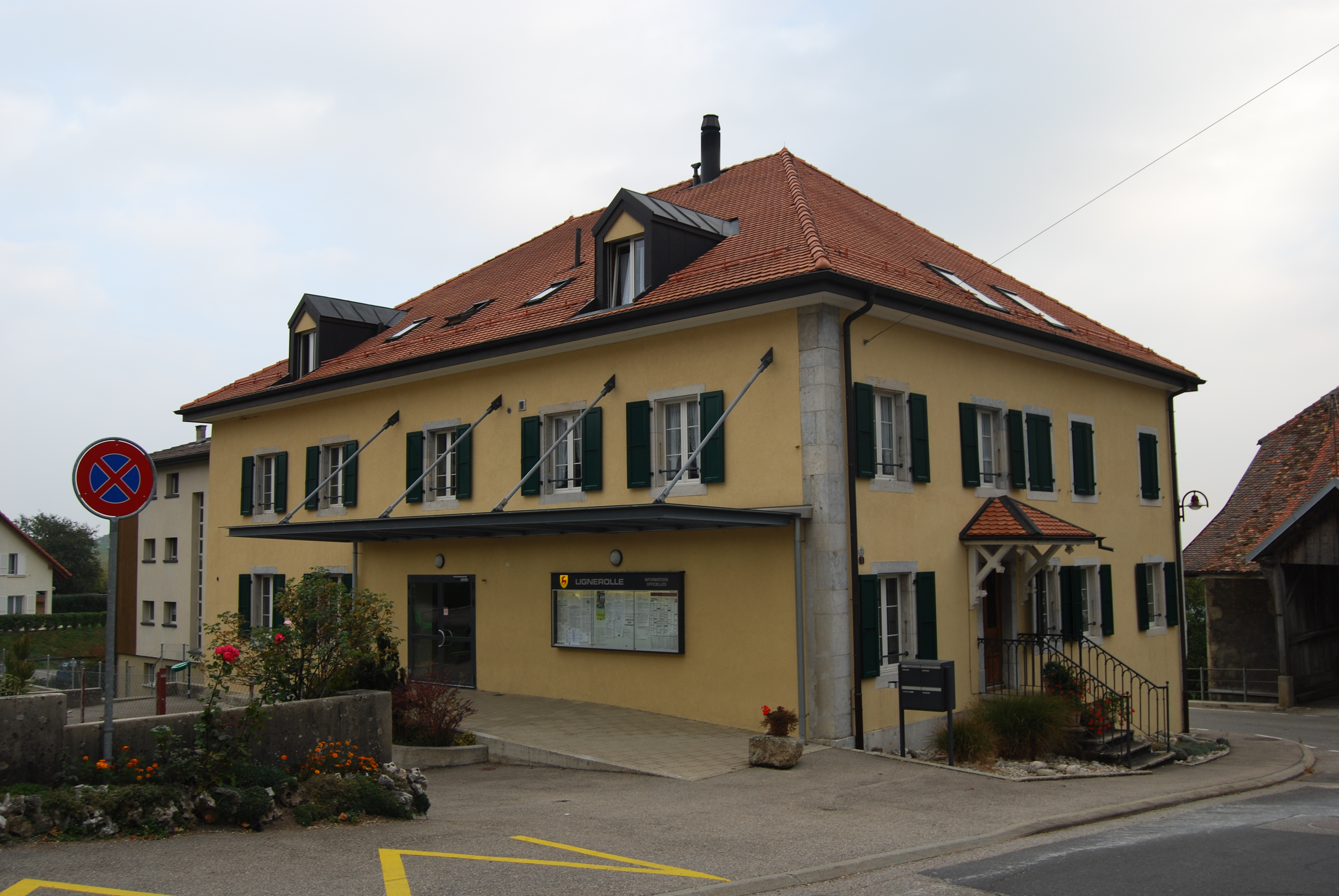
- Municipal administration of Lignerolle

- Flag Coat of arms
- Location of Lignerolle
- Location within Switzerland Location within Canton of Vaud
- Coordinates: 46°44′N 06°27′E
- Country: Switzerland
- Canton: Vaud
- District: Jura-Nord Vaudois

Government
  - Mayor: Syndic; Jean-Claude Nicod

Area
  - Total: 10.7 km^{2} (4.1 sq mi)
- Elevation: 760 m (2,490 ft)

Population (2004)
  - Total: 360
  - Density: 34/km^{2} (87/sq mi)
- Demonym(s): Les Lignerollois; Les Bœufs
- Time zone: UTC+01:00 (CET)
  - Summer (DST): UTC+02:00 (CEST)
- Postal code: 1357
- SFOS number: 5755
- ISO 3166 code: CH-VD
- Surrounded by: L'Abergement, Les Clées, Ballaigues, France (pays)
- Website: website missing Profile (in French), SFSO statistics

Lignerolle is a municipality in the district of Jura-Nord Vaudois in the canton of Vaud in Switzerland.

== History ==
Lignerolle is first mentioned around 1160–64 as de Lineroles.

== Geography ==
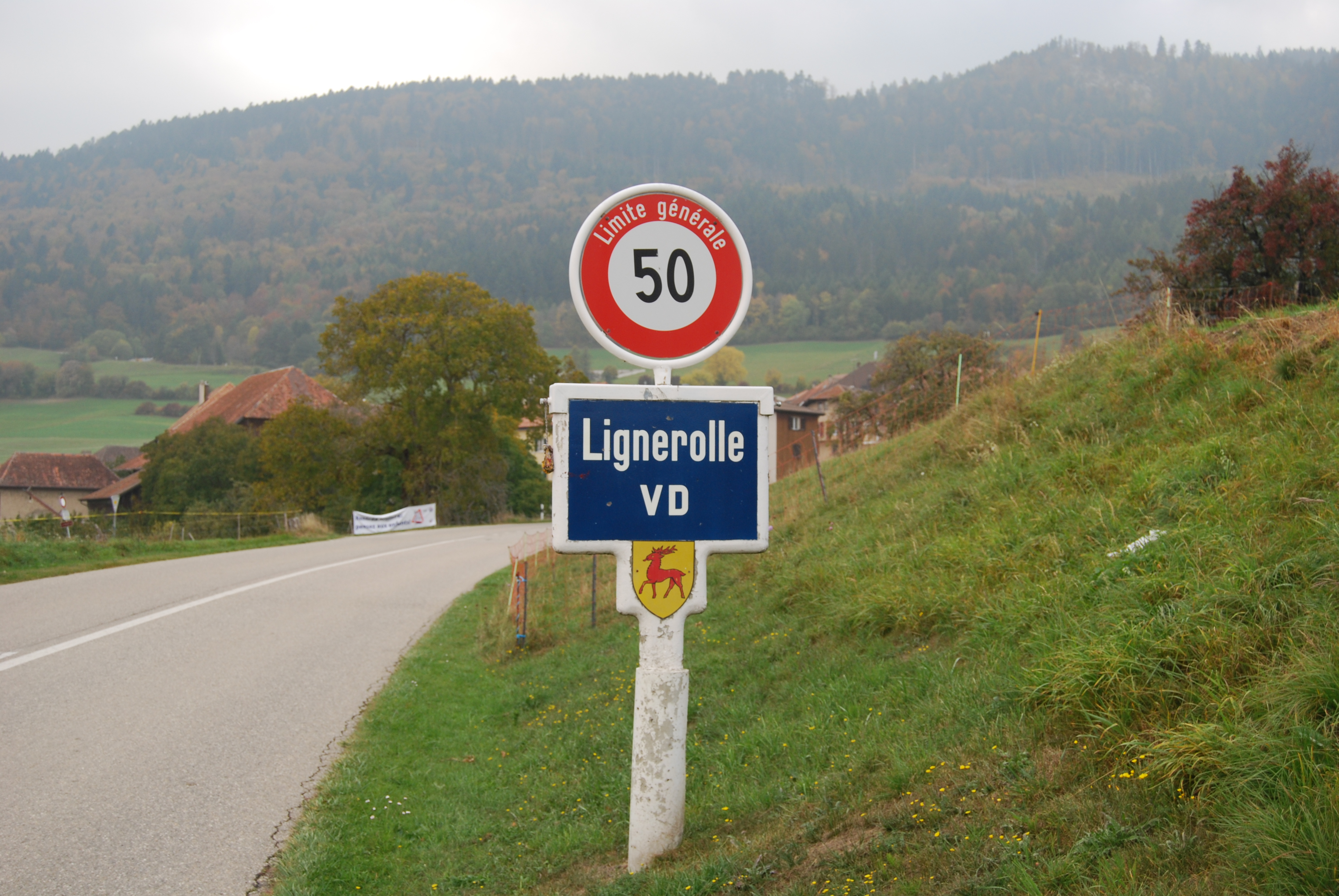
Entrance to Lignerolle

Lignerolle has an area, as of 2009, of 10.7 square kilometers (4.1 mi^{2}). Of this area, 5.17 km^{2} (2.00 mi^{2}) or 48.5% is used for agricultural purposes, while 4.94 km^{2} (1.91 mi^{2}) or 46.3% is forested. Of the rest of the land, 0.5 km^{2} (0.19 mi^{2}) or 4.7% is settled (buildings or roads) and 0.03 km^{2} (7.4 acres) or 0.3% is unproductive land.

Of the built up area, housing and buildings made up 1.5% and transportation infrastructure made up 2.9%. Out of the forested land, 41.8% of the total land area is heavily forested and 4.5% is covered with orchards or small clusters of trees. Of the agricultural land, 14.7% is used for growing crops and 14.5% is pastures and 18.9% is used for alpine pastures.

The municipality was part of the Orbe District until it was dissolved on 31 August 2006, and Lignerolle became part of the new district of Jura-Nord Vaudois.

The municipality is located on the slopes of Suchet mountain.

== Coat of arms ==
The blazon of the municipal coat of arms is Or, a Buck passant Gules.

== Demographics ==
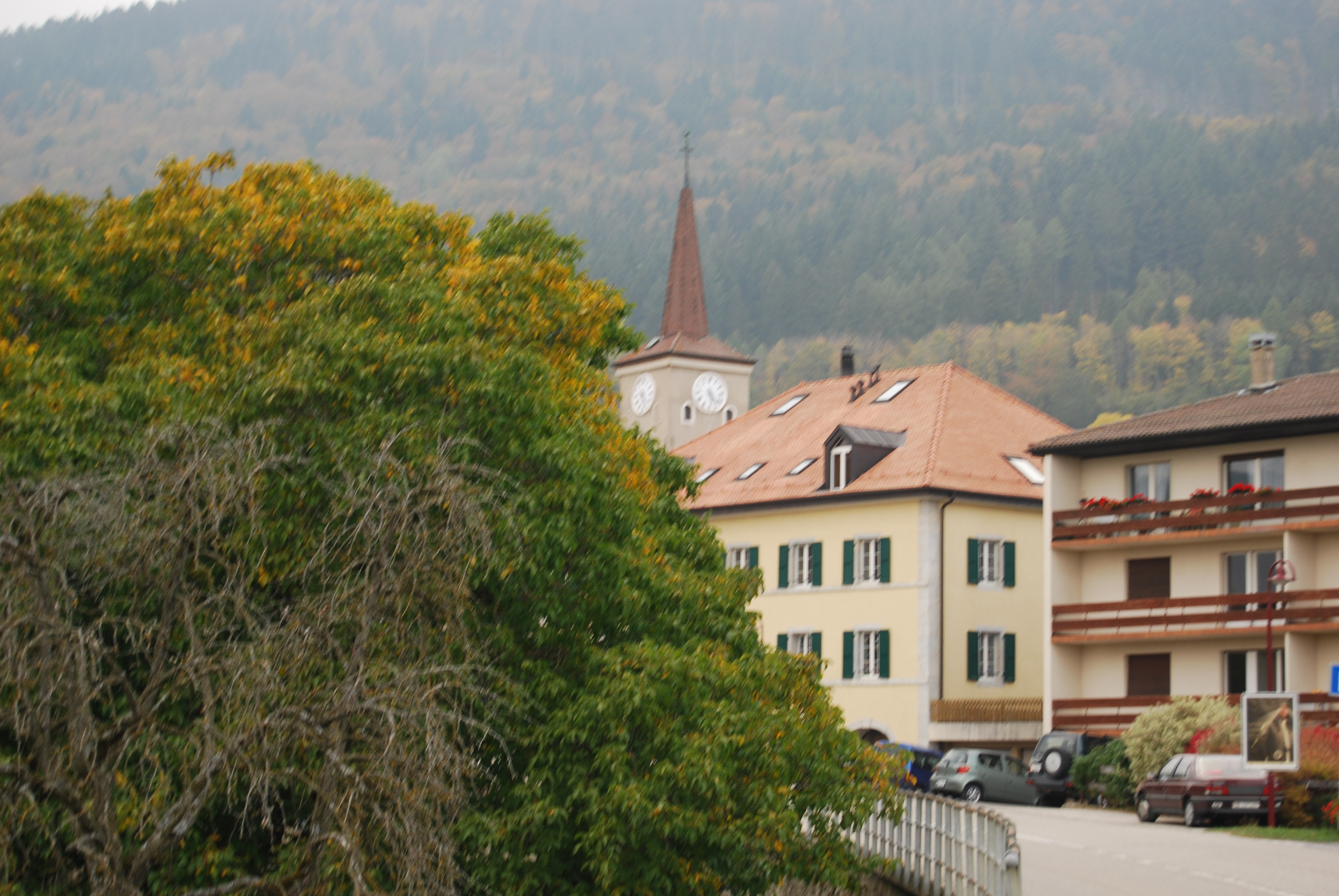
Lignerolle church and buildings

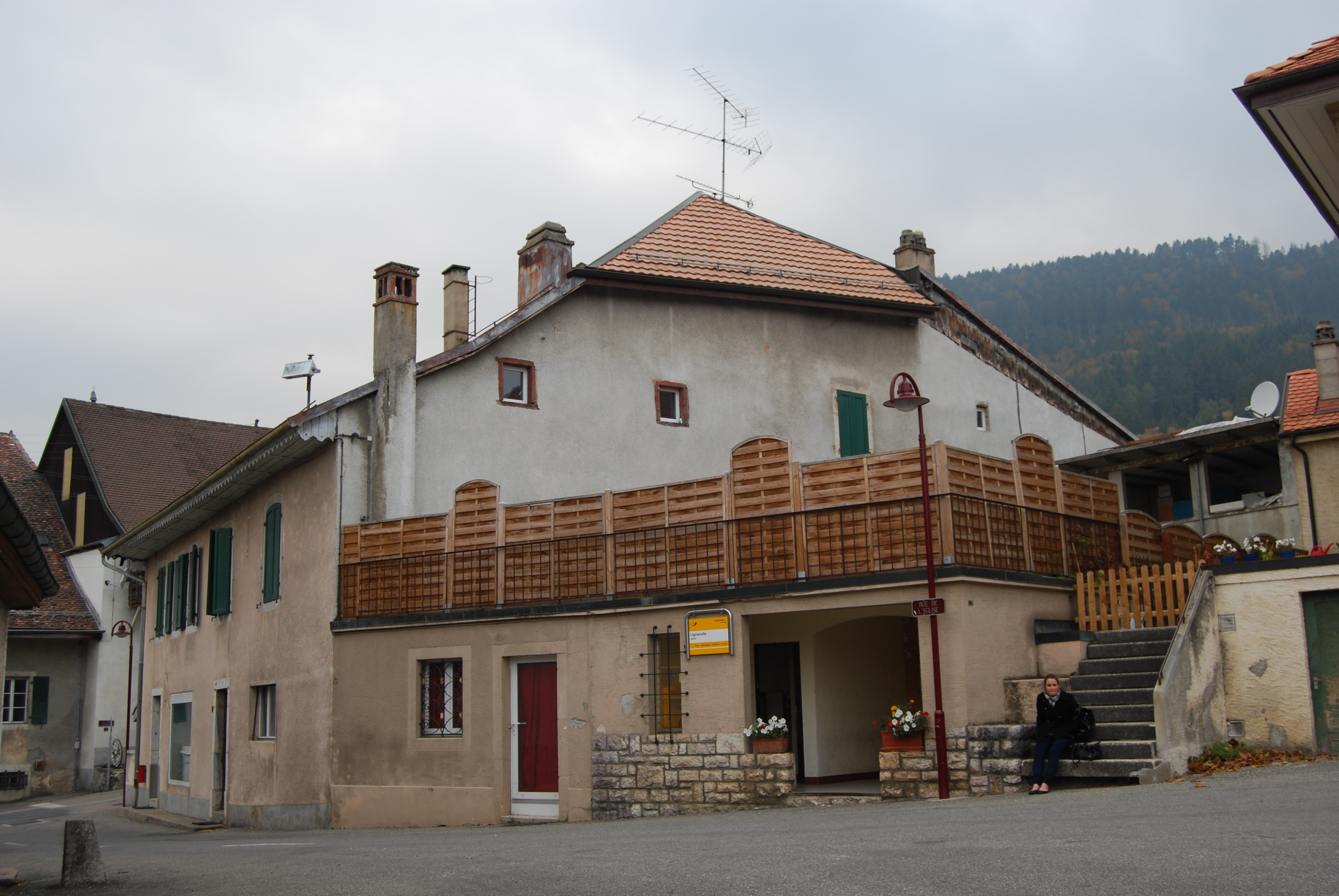
Post building in Lignerolle

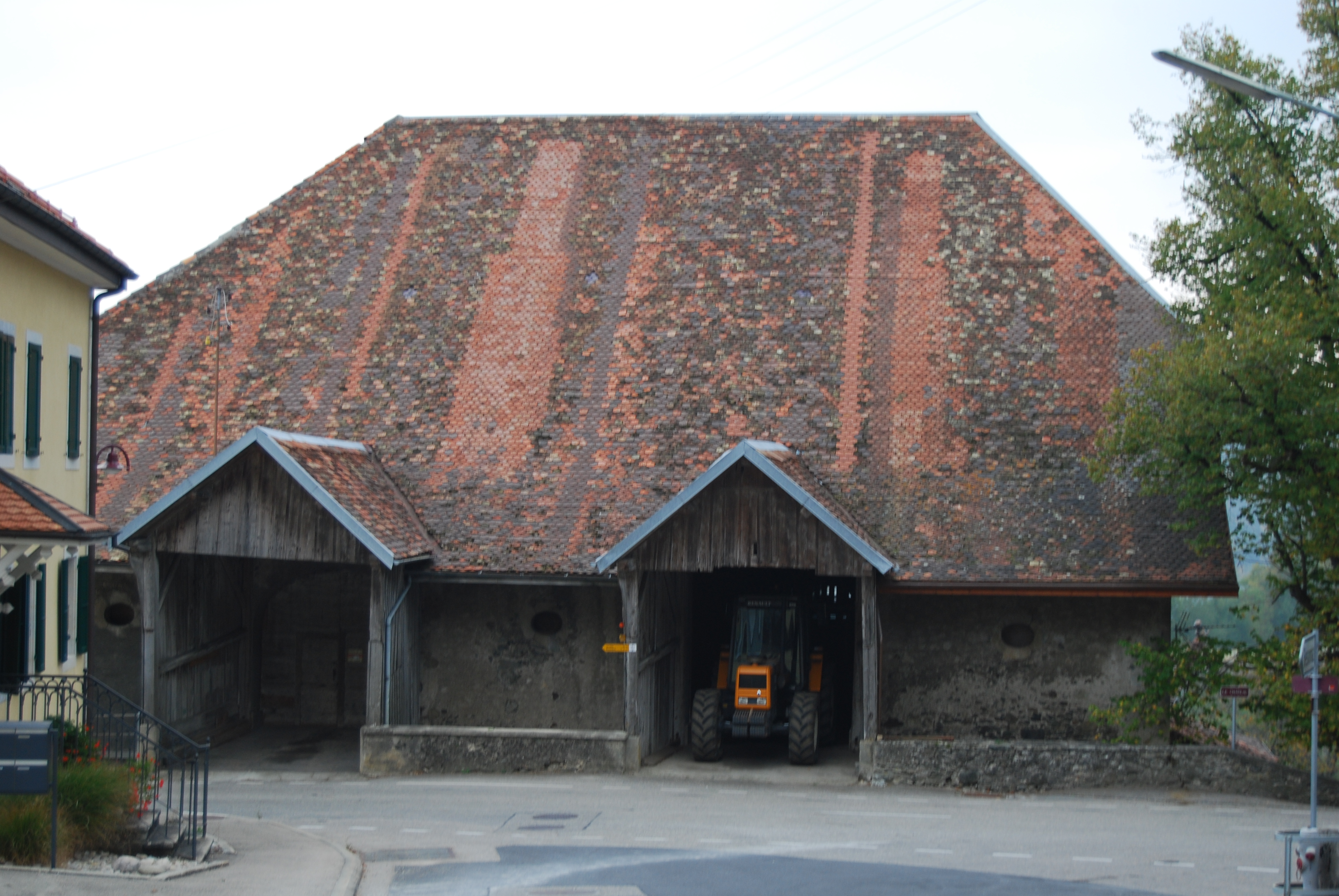
Farming building in Lignerolle

Lignerolle has a population (as of December 2020) of 435. As of 2008, 10.2% of the population are resident foreign nationals. Over the last 10 years (1999–2009 ) the population has changed at a rate of 17.4%. It has changed at a rate of 13.4% due to migration and at a rate of 4% due to births and deaths.

Most of the population (as of 2000) speaks French (316 or 94.6%), with German being second most common (10 or 3.0%) and Italian being third (3 or 0.9%).

The age distribution, as of 2009, in Lignerolle is; 33 children or 8.6% of the population are between 0 and 9 years old and 67 teenagers or 17.4% are between 10 and 19. Of the adult population, 41 people or 10.6% of the population are between 20 and 29 years old. 64 people or 16.6% are between 30 and 39, 55 people or 14.3% are between 40 and 49, and 56 people or 14.5% are between 50 and 59. The senior population distribution is 31 people or 8.1% of the population are between 60 and 69 years old, 16 people or 4.2% are between 70 and 79, there are 19 people or 4.9% who are between 80 and 89, and there are 3 people or 0.8% who are 90 and older.

As of 2000, there were 136 people who were single and never married in the municipality. There were 169 married individuals, 16 widows or widowers and 13 individuals who are divorced.

As of 2000, there were 126 private households in the municipality, and an average of 2.6 persons per household. There were 30 households that consist of only one person and 12 households with five or more people. Out of a total of 129 households that answered this question, 23.3% were households made up of just one person. Of the rest of the households, there are 40 married couples without children, 47 married couples with children There were 7 single parents with a child or children. There were 2 households that were made up of unrelated people and 3 households that were made up of some sort of institution or another collective housing.

In 2000 there were 57 single family homes (or 55.9% of the total) out of a total of 102 inhabited buildings. There were 17 multi-family buildings (16.7%), along with 18 multi-purpose buildings that were mostly used for housing (17.6%) and 10 other use buildings (commercial or industrial) that also had some housing (9.8%).

In 2000, a total of 121 apartments (80.1% of the total) were permanently occupied, while 24 apartments (15.9%) were seasonally occupied and 6 apartments (4.0%) were empty. As of 2009, the construction rate of new housing units was 0 new units per 1000 residents. The vacancy rate for the municipality, in 2010, was 0%.

The historical population is given in the following chart:

== Sights ==
The entire village of Lignerolle is designated as part of the Inventory of Swiss Heritage Sites.

== Politics ==
In the 2007 federal election the most popular party was the SVP which received 32.4% of the vote. The next three most popular parties were the SP (17.3%), the EDU Party (10.23%) and the Green Party (9.18%). In the federal election, a total of 126 votes were cast, and the voter turnout was 46.8%.

== Economy ==
As of 2010, Lignerolle had an unemployment rate of 4.6%. As of 2008, there were 29 people employed in the primary economic sector and about 10 businesses involved in this sector. 13 people were employed in the secondary sector and there were 4 businesses in this sector. 21 people were employed in the tertiary sector, with 10 businesses in this sector. There were 147 residents of the municipality who were employed in some capacity, of which females made up 48.3% of the workforce.

In 2008 the total number of full-time equivalent jobs was 51. The number of jobs in the primary sector was 22, of which 17 were in agriculture and 5 were in forestry or lumber production. The number of jobs in the secondary sector was 12 of which 10 or (83.3%) were in manufacturing and 2 (16.7%) were in construction. The number of jobs in the tertiary sector was 17. In the tertiary sector; 2 or 11.8% were in wholesale or retail sales or the repair of motor vehicles, 5 or 29.4% were in a hotel or restaurant, 1 was in the information industry, 5 or 29.4% were technical professionals or scientists, 2 or 11.8% were in education.

In 2000, there were 41 workers who commuted into the municipality and 100 workers who commuted away. The municipality is a net exporter of workers, with about 2.4 workers leaving the municipality for every one entering. About 24.4% of the workforce coming into Lignerolle are coming from outside Switzerland. Of the working population, 4.8% used public transportation to get to work, and 66.7% used a private car.

== Religion ==
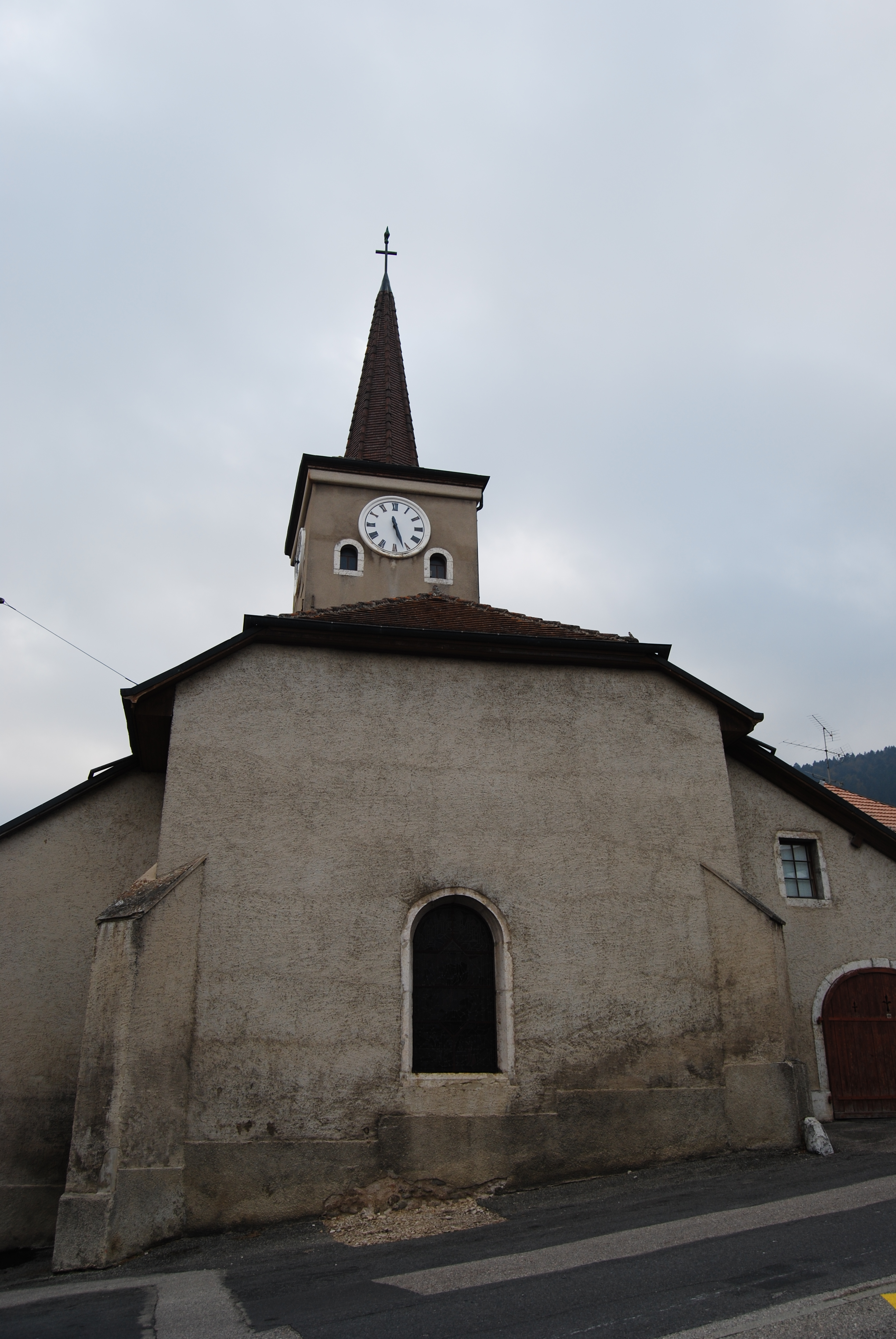
Lignerolle church

From the 2000 census, 33 or 9.9% were Roman Catholic, while 171 or 51.2% belonged to the Swiss Reformed Church. Of the rest of the population, there was 1 individual who belongs to the Christian Catholic Church, and there were 109 individuals (or about 32.63% of the population) who belonged to another Christian church. There were 1 individual who belonged to another church. 59 (or about 17.66% of the population) belonged to no church, are agnostic or atheist, and 14 individuals (or about 4.19% of the population) did not answer the question.

== Education ==
In Lignerolle about 136 or (40.7%) of the population have completed non-mandatory upper secondary education, and 28 or (8.4%) have completed additional higher education (either university or a Fachhochschule). Of the 28 who completed tertiary schooling, 64.3% were Swiss men, 25.0% were Swiss women.

In the 2009/2010 school year there were a total of 56 students in the Lignerolle school district. In the Vaud cantonal school system, two years of non-obligatory pre-school are provided by the political districts. During the school year, the political district provided pre-school care for a total of 578 children of which 359 children (62.1%) received subsidized pre-school care. The canton's primary school program requires students to attend for four years. There were 23 students in the municipal primary school program. The obligatory lower secondary school program lasts for six years and there were 33 students in those schools.

As of 2000, there were 8 students in Lignerolle who came from another municipality, while 54 residents attended schools outside the municipality.
