= Les Clées =

- Municipality
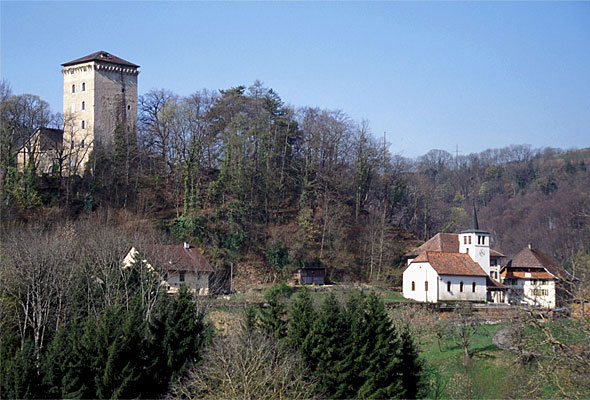
- Les Clées castle above the village

- Flag Coat of arms
- Location of Les Clées
- Location within Switzerland Location within Canton of Vaud
- Coordinates: 46°44′N 06°28′E
- Country: Switzerland
- Canton: Vaud
- District: Jura-Nord Vaudois

Government
  - Mayor: Syndic; M. Charles Burri

Area
  - Total: 7.02 km^{2} (2.71 sq mi)
- Elevation: 605 m (1,985 ft)

Population (2004)
  - Total: 153
  - Density: 21.8/km^{2} (56.4/sq mi)
- Demonym(s): Les Bourdons; Les Moustiques
- Time zone: UTC+01:00 (CET)
  - Summer (DST): UTC+02:00 (CEST)
- Postal code: 1356
- SFOS number: 5750
- ISO 3166 code: CH-VD
- Localities: La Russille
- Surrounded by: L'Abergement, Sergey, Montcherand, Agiez, Bretonnières, Premier, Vallorbe, Ballaigues, Lignerolle
- Website: www.lesclees.ch

Les Clées is a municipality in the district of Jura-Nord Vaudois in the canton of Vaud in Switzerland.

== History ==
Les Clées is first mentioned in 1134 as Clees.

Above the village are the remains of the castle. The keep was restored in the 19th century, but the rest of castle remained in ruins. During the Middle Ages was a city that was granted numerous freedoms in 1272 by the Count of Savoy. It owed its prosperity to the traffic through the Jougne Pass and the tolls that the castle collected on the pass road. Starting in 1536 it belonged to the bailiwick of Yverdon.

The city was the center of the Les Clées district or bailiwick, which also included another eight villages. From the 15th century until 1566, the Vallée de Joux also belonged to the district. In 1134, Pope Innocent II tried in vain to prohibit the reconstruction of the castle. In 1232, Hugo IV, the Duke of Burgundy granted the district to Guillaume II, the Count of Geneva. The Duke of Burgundy also transferred the feudal rights over the district to Jean Chalon in 1237, who was unable to maintain these rights. renounced the feudal rule and transferred them to, who could not be sustained. The Count of Geneva then held these rights until he was forced to give them up in 1260, following his defeat by Peter of Savoy. In 1272, Count Philip I of Savoy and the dean of Romainmôtier entered into a contract, which granted the protection of the monastery and its lands to the castle of Les Clées. The subjects of the provost had to pay for a tax for this privilege, which continued until 1798. During the Burgundian War, on 22 October 1475, Swiss Confederation troops seized and destroyed the city and castle and killed the castle garrison. Under Bernese rule there were three courts in the Les Clées district, one of which was held in the city. Nevertheless, the city gradually lost importance.

The chapel of Les Clées was built before the 14th century. It was a filial church of the parish of Lignerolle and remained under it even after the Protestant Reformation. The chapel was rebuilt in 1738–1740.

From the end of the 15th century until the beginning of the 18th century there was a furnace and a pig iron smelting operation in the village. The construction of the Vallorbe-Lausanne highway in 1990 divided the community in two.

== Geography ==
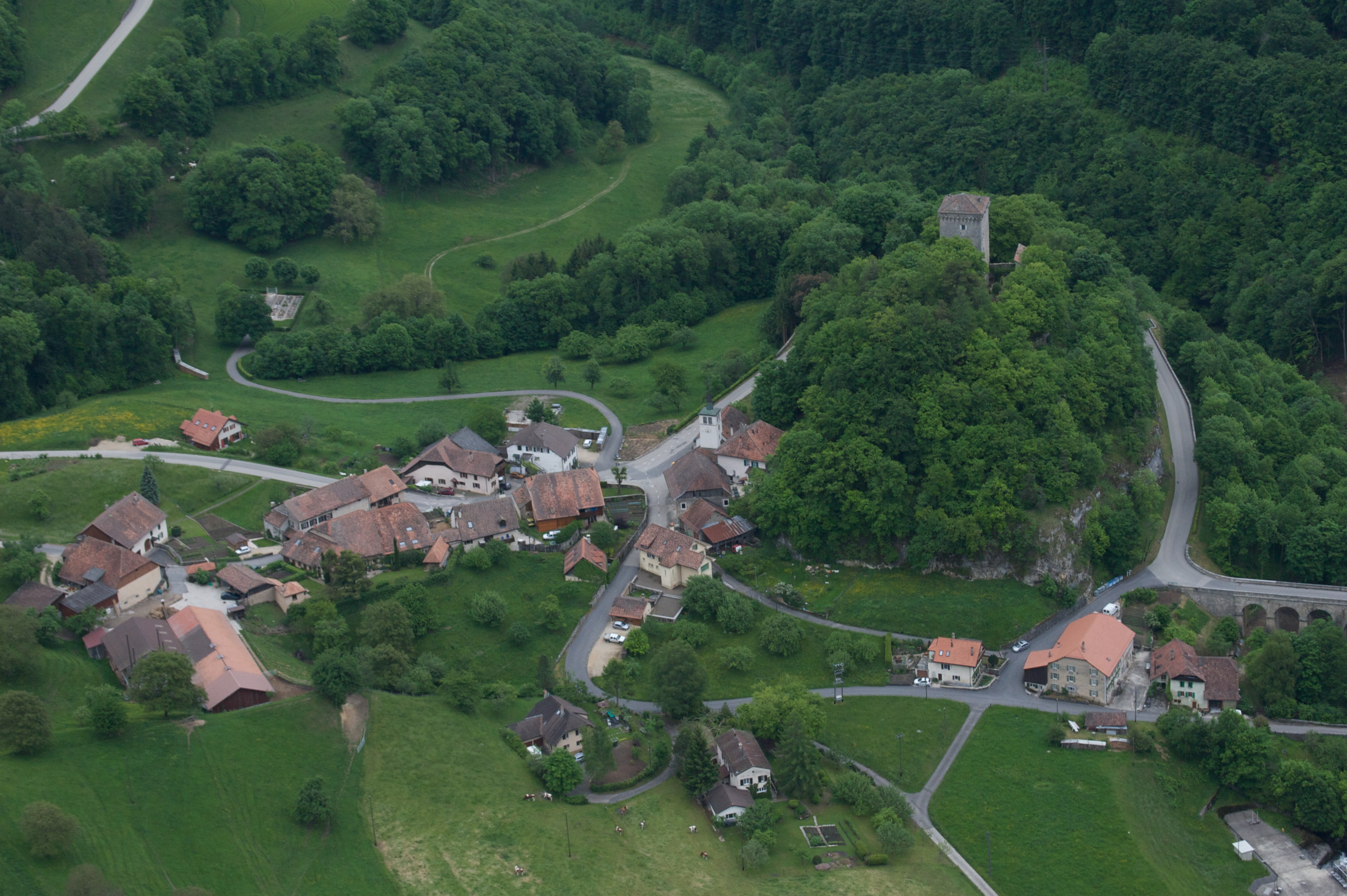
Aerial view of Les Clées

Les Clées has an area, as of 2009, of 7 square kilometers (2.7 mi^{2}). Of this area, 1.69 km^{2} (0.65 mi^{2}) or 24.0% is used for agricultural purposes, while 4.93 km^{2} (1.90 mi^{2}) or 70.0% is forested. Of the rest of the land, 0.38 km^{2} (0.15 mi^{2}) or 5.4% is settled (buildings or roads), 0.07 km^{2} (17 acres) or 1.0% is either rivers or lakes.

Of the built up area, housing and buildings made up 0.7% and transportation infrastructure made up 3.8%. Out of the forested land, 67.2% of the total land area is heavily forested and 2.8% is covered with orchards or small clusters of trees. Of the agricultural land, 8.7% is used for growing crops and 15.3% is pastures. All the water in the municipality is flowing water.

The municipality was part of the Orbe District until it was dissolved on 31 August 2006, and Les Clées became part of the new district of Jura-Nord Vaudois.

The municipality consists of the village of Les Clées and the hamlet of La Russille.

== Coat of arms ==
The blazon of the municipal coat of arms is Gules, a Fence Argent.

== Demographics ==
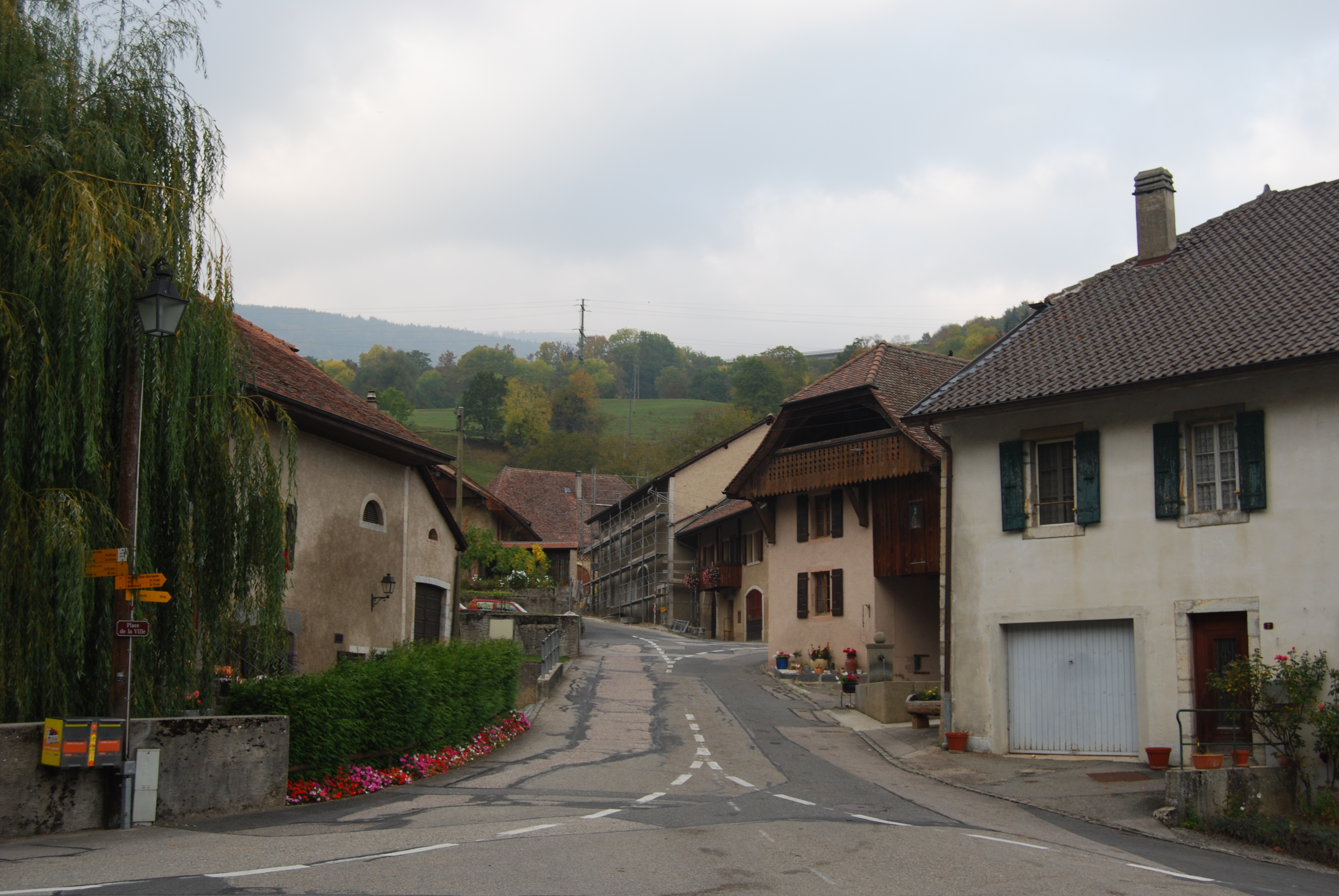
Les Clées village

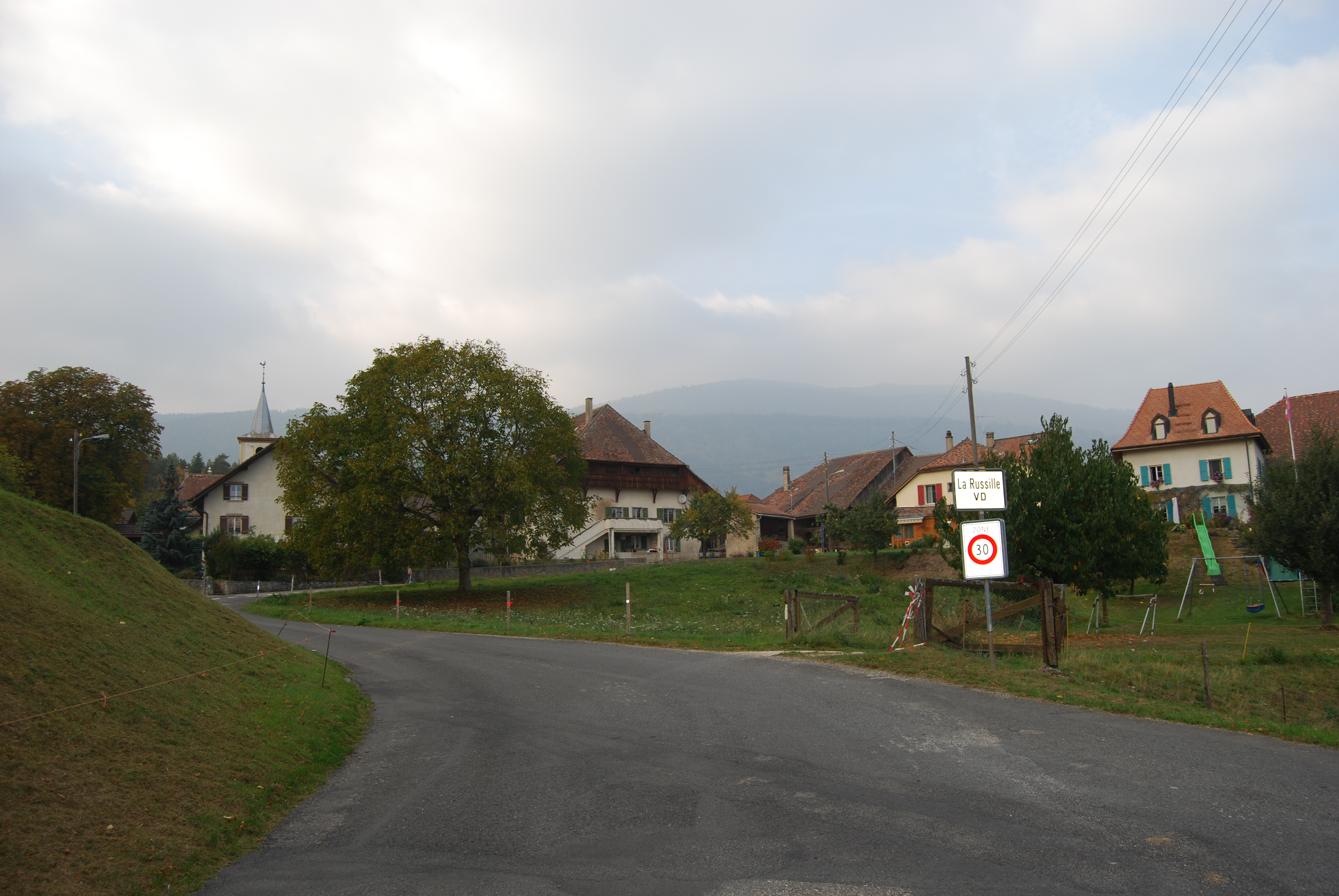
La Rusille hamlet

Les Clées has a population (as of December 2020) of 187. As of 2008, 7.9% of the population are resident foreign nationals. Over the last 10 years (1999–2009 ) the population has changed at a rate of 3.9%. It has changed at a rate of 7.7% due to migration and at a rate of -3.9% due to births and deaths.

Most of the population (as of 2000) speaks French (145 or 94.2%), with German being second most common (6 or 3.9%) and Serbo-Croatian being third (2 or 1.3%).

The age distribution, as of 2009, in Les Clées is; 15 children or 9.3% of the population are between 0 and 9 years old and 18 teenagers or 11.2% are between 10 and 19. Of the adult population, 17 people or 10.6% of the population are between 20 and 29 years old. 19 people or 11.8% are between 30 and 39, 23 people or 14.3% are between 40 and 49, and 36 people or 22.4% are between 50 and 59. The senior population distribution is 23 people or 14.3% of the population are between 60 and 69 years old, 2 people or 1.2% are between 70 and 79, there are 7 people or 4.3% who are between 80 and 89, and there is 1 person who is 90 and older.

As of 2000, there were 64 people who were single and never married in the municipality. There were 71 married individuals, 10 widows or widowers and 9 individuals who are divorced.

As of 2000, there were 60 private households in the municipality, and an average of 2.6 persons per household. There were 15 households that consist of only one person and 6 households with five or more people. Out of a total of 60 households that answered this question, 25.0% were households made up of just one person and there was 1 adult who lived with their parents. Of the rest of the households, there are 21 married couples without children, 20 married couples with children There were 2 single parents with a child or children. There was 1 household that was made up of unrelated people.

In 2000 there were 28 single family homes (or 57.1% of the total) out of a total of 49 inhabited buildings. There were 9 multi-family buildings (18.4%), along with 10 multi-purpose buildings that were mostly used for housing (20.4%) and 2 other use buildings (commercial or industrial) that also had some housing (4.1%).

In 2000, a total of 60 apartments (93.8% of the total) were permanently occupied, while 1 apartment was seasonally occupied and 3 apartments (4.7%) were empty. As of 2009, the construction rate of new housing units was 0 new units per 1000 residents. The vacancy rate for the municipality, in 2010, was 0%.

The historical population is given in the following chart:

== Heritage sites of national significance ==
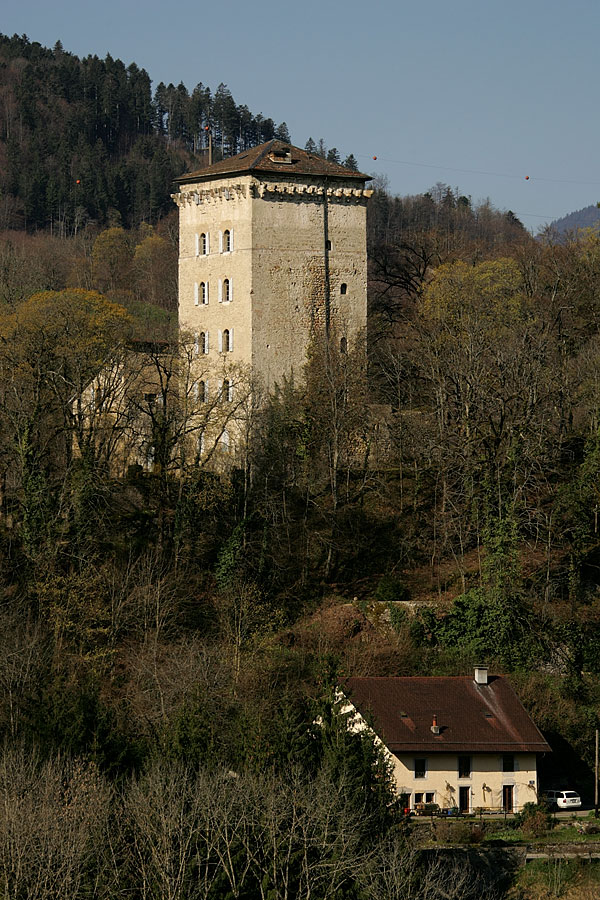
Les Clées Castle

Les Clées Castle with the surrounding ruins and village is listed as a Swiss heritage site of national significance. The hamlet of La Russille and the Les Clées region are part of the Inventory of Swiss Heritage Sites.

== Politics ==
In the 2007 federal election the most popular party was the SVP which received 25.31% of the vote. The next three most popular parties were the SP (21.62%), the FDP (20.49%) and the LPS Party (10.35%). In the federal election, a total of 58 votes were cast, and the voter turnout was 48.3%.

== Economy ==
As of 2010, Les Clées had an unemployment rate of 4.5%. As of 2008, there were 8 people employed in the primary economic sector and about 4 businesses involved in this sector. 9 people were employed in the secondary sector and there were 2 businesses in this sector. 10 people were employed in the tertiary sector, with 3 businesses in this sector. There were 76 residents of the municipality who were employed in some capacity, of which females made up 36.8% of the workforce.

In 2008 the total number of full-time equivalent jobs was 22. The number of jobs in the primary sector was 6, all of which were in agriculture. The number of jobs in the secondary sector was 8 of which 1 was in manufacturing and 7 (87.5%) were in construction. The number of jobs in the tertiary sector was 8. In the tertiary sector; 6 or 75.0% were in wholesale or retail sales or the repair of motor vehicles, 1 was in a hotel or restaurant, 2 or 25.0% were in education.

In 2000, there were 6 workers who commuted into the municipality and 55 workers who commuted away. The municipality is a net exporter of workers, with about 9.2 workers leaving the municipality for every one entering. Of the working population, 6.6% used public transportation to get to work, and 68.4% used a private car.

== Religion ==
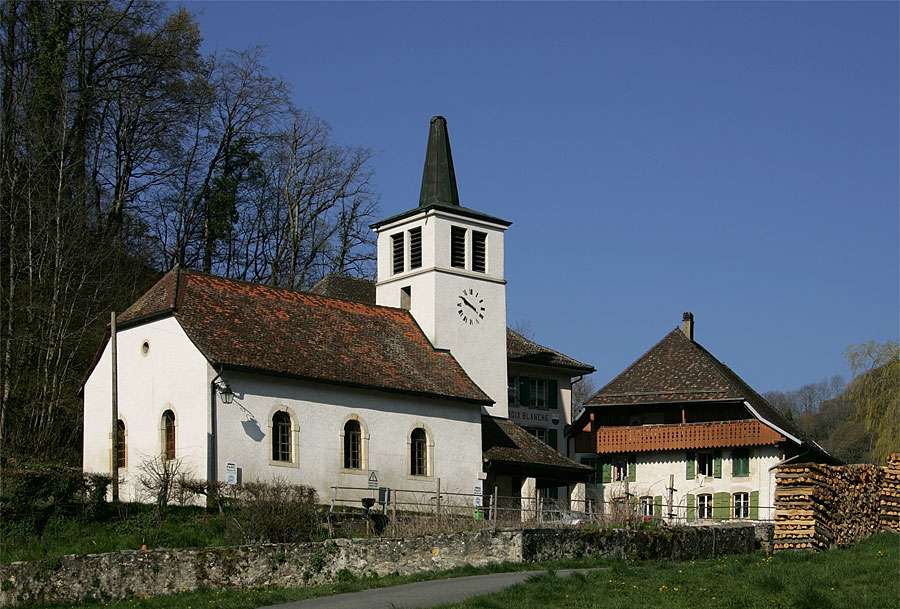
Les Clées church

From the 2000 census, 19 or 12.3% were Roman Catholic, while 107 or 69.5% belonged to the Swiss Reformed Church. Of the rest of the population, there were 20 individuals (or about 12.99% of the population) who belonged to another Christian church. There were 2 (or about 1.30% of the population) who were Islamic. 16 (or about 10.39% of the population) belonged to no church, are agnostic or atheist.

== Education ==
In Les Clées about 62 or (40.3%) of the population have completed non-mandatory upper secondary education, and 18 or (11.7%) have completed additional higher education (either university or a Fachhochschule). Of the 18 who completed tertiary schooling, 83.3% were Swiss men, 11.1% were Swiss women.

In the 2009/2010 school year there were a total of 17 students in the Les Clées school district. In the Vaud cantonal school system, two years of non-obligatory pre-school are provided by the political districts. During the school year, the political district provided pre-school care for a total of 578 children of which 359 children (62.1%) received subsidized pre-school care. The canton's primary school program requires students to attend for four years. There were 8 students in the municipal primary school program. The obligatory lower secondary school program lasts for six years and there were 9 students in those schools.

As of 2000, there were 14 students in Les Clées who came from another municipality, while 31 residents attended schools outside the municipality.
