= Life sciences industry in Switzerland =

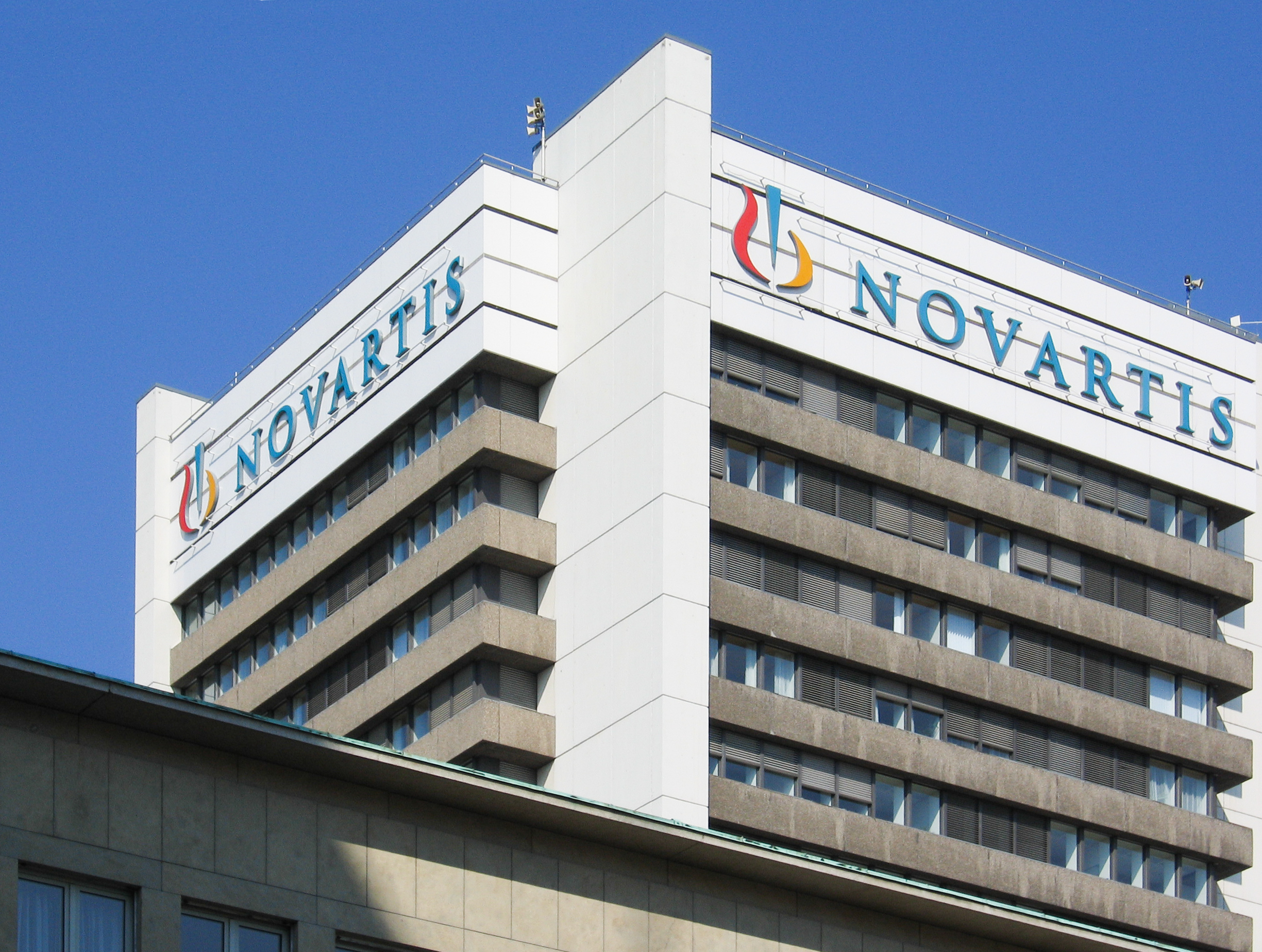
One of the many buildings of Novartis in Basel

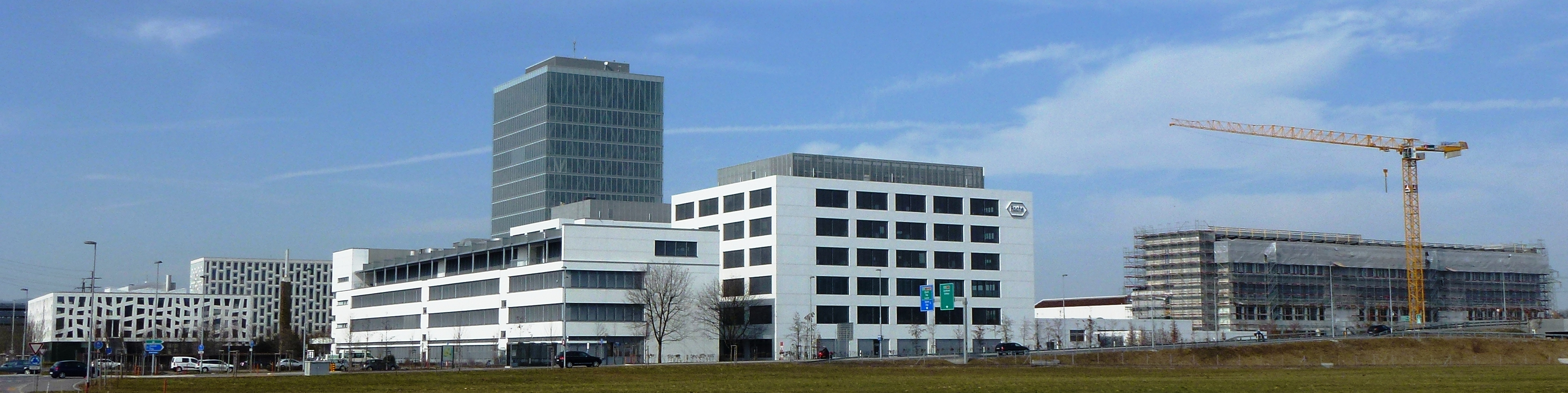
The headquarters of Roche Diagnostics in Rotkreuz, Switzerland

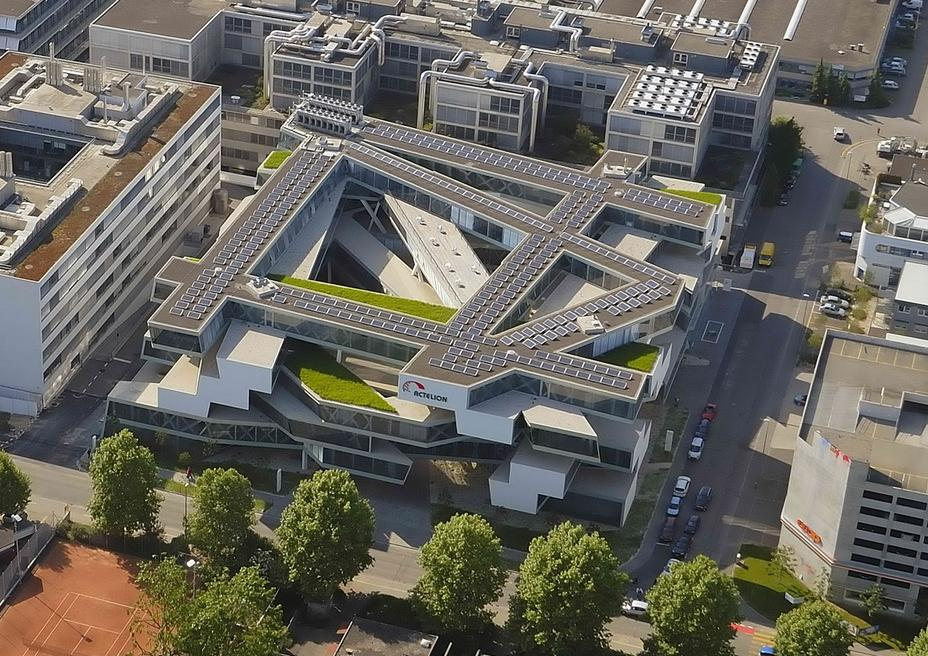
The headquarters of Actelion in Allschwil

The life sciences industry in Switzerland directly and indirectly employs about 135,000 people. It contributes 5.7% of the gross domestic product of Switzerland and 30% of the country's exports. In 2017 about 30% of Swiss exports (worth $84.8 billion) were chemical products. In the same year Switzerland was the second largest exporter of packaged medicine in the world, with about 11% of the global total, worth $36.5 billion.

Switzerland is home to many pharmaceutical companies, including very large groups, such as Novartis and Hoffmann-La Roche. In 2013, 41 life science companies had their international headquarters (and 29 more their regional headquarters) in Switzerland.

== History ==
- 1896: foundation of Hoffmann-La Roche.
- 1933: foundation of Interpharma.
- 1950s: Cilag merged with Janssen Pharmaceutica, into Janssen-Cilag.
- 1996: Ciba-Geigy merged with Sandoz, with the pharmaceutical and agrochemical divisions of both staying together to form Novartis. Other Ciba-Geigy and Sandoz businesses were sold off, or, like Ciba Specialty Chemicals, were spun off as independent companies. The Sandoz brand disappeared for three years, but was revived in 2003 when Novartis consolidated its generic drugs businesses into a single subsidiary and named it Sandoz.
- 1990: Hoffmann-La Roche owned a majority of Genentech. It was to be completely integrated in 2009.
- 2000: Novartis divested its agrochemical and genetically modified crops business with the spinout of Syngenta, in partnership with AstraZeneca, which also divested its agrochemical business.
- 2023: Sandoz spun off from Novartis as a stand-alone company.

== Companies ==
A number of life sciences companies are either headquartered in Switzerland or maintain regional headquarters in Switzerland:

Company	Location	Canton	Divisions
Abbott Laboratories	Basel	Basel-Stadt	Established Pharmaceuticals Division
AC Immune	Lausanne	Vaud	Global headquarters
Accuray	Morges,	Vaud	International headquarters
Acino Holding	Zürich	Zürich	Global headquarters
Actelion, (Johnson & Johnson)	Allschwil	Basel-Landschaft	Global headquarters
Alcon	Geneva	Geneva	Global headquarters
Alexion Pharmaceuticals	Baar	Zug	International headquarters
Amgen	Rotkreuz	Zug	European hub
AstraZeneca	Baar	Zug	International headquarters
Bachem	Bubendorf	Basel-Landschaft	Global headquarters
Basilea Pharmaceutica	Allschwil	Basel-Landschaft	Global headquarters
Baxter International	Zürich	Zürich	European headquarters
Bayer	Basel	Basel-Stadt	Consumer Health Division, Hemophilia & Ophthalmology Pharma Global HQ Divisions with some Oncology
Beckman Coulter	Nyon	Vaud	European and emerging markets headquarters
Becton Dickinson	Eysins	Vaud	European headquarters
Bio-Rad	Basel	Basel-Stadt	European headquarters
Biogen	Baar	Zug	International headquarters
Biognosys	Schlieren	Zürich	Global headquarters
Bristol Myers Squibb	Boudry	Neuchâtel	Various global functions and global product supply Functions
Caris Life Sciences	Basel	Basel-Stadt	European headquarters
Cerbios-Pharma	Lugano	Ticino	Global headquarters
Cochlear Limited	Basel	Basel-Stadt	European headquarters
Debiopharm	Lausanne	Vaud	Global headquarters
Edwards Lifesciences	Nyon	Vaud	European headquarters
Exact Sciences	Baar	Zug	International headquarters
Ferring Pharmaceuticals	Saint-Prex	Vaud	Pharmaceutical manufacturing site
Finox Biotech	Kirchberg	Bern	Global headquarters
Galderma	Zug	Zug	Global headquarters
Galenica	Bern	Bern	Global headquarters
Genedata	Basel	Basel-Stadt	Global headquarters
GlaxoSmithKline	Münchenbuchsee	Bern	Local headquarters
Helsinn	Lugano	Ticino	Global headquarters
Hocoma	Volketswil	Zürich	Global headquarters
Idorsia	Allschwil	Basel-Landschaft	Global headquarters
Incyte	Morges	Vaud	European headquarters
InSphero	Schlieren	Zürich	Global headquarters
Intuitive Surgical	Aubonne	Vaud	European headquarters
Janssen-Cilag, (Johnson & Johnson)	Zug	Zug	Local headquarters
Lonza	Basel	Basel-Stadt	Global headquarters
Masimo	Neuchâtel	Neuchâtel	International headquarters
Medela	Baar	Zug	Global headquarters
Medtronic	Tolochenaz	Vaud	Europe & Central Asia headquarters
Moderna	Basel	Basel-Stadt	EMEA headquarters
Molecular Partners	Schlieren	Zürich	Global headquarters
MSD	Lucerne	Lucerne	Local headquarters and pharmaceutical manufacturing site
NBE-Therapeutics	Basel	Basel-Stadt	Global headquarters
Neovii Pharmaceuticals	Rapperswil	St. Gallen	Global headquarters
NovaCurie	Bern	Bern	Global headquarters
Novartis	Basel	Basel-Stadt	Global headquarters
Novimmune	Geneva	Geneva	Global headquarters
Novo Nordisk	Zürich	Zürich	International operations
Octapharma	Lachen	Schwyz	Global headquarters
OM Pharma	Meyrin	Geneva	Global headquarters
Roche	Basel	Basel-Stadt	Global headquarters
Sandoz	Basel	Basel-Stadt	Global headquarters
Santhera	Pratteln	Basel-Landschaft	Global headquarters
Seagen	Zug	Zug	European headquarters
Senn Chemicals	Dielsdorf	Zürich	Global headquarters
Siegfried Holding	Zofingen, Aargau	Aargau	Global headquarters and manufacturing site
Sonova	Stäfa, Zürich	Zürich	Global headquarters
Sotio Biotech	Basel	Basel-Stadt	Local subsidiary
STAAR Surgical	Nidau	Bern	International headquarters
Straumann	Basel	Basel-Stadt	Global headquarters
Takeda Pharmaceutical	Zürich	Zürich	Europe & Canada business unit
Tecan	Männedorf	Zürich	Global headquarters
VAXIMM	Basel	Basel-Stadt	Global headquarters
CSL Vifor	St. Gallen	St. Gallen	Global headquarters
Ypsomed Holding	Burgdorf	Bern	Global headquarters

== Life sciences ==
70% of the investments in life sciences in Europe are made in the United Kingdom, Germany, Ireland, the Netherlands, France, and Switzerland.

In addition to pharmaceutical companies (65 companies), Switzerland is home to many companies in the fields of biotechnology (338 companies) or medical devices and technology (341 companies). According to KPMG, there are 120 life science companies in Basel, 132 in Zürich and 92 in the Lemanic region.

In 2013, 41 life science companies had their international headquarters (and 29 more their regional headquarters) in Switzerland. In Switzerland, there are about 51,000 workers in the field of medical technologies (1,600 companies) and 13,700 on the field of biotechnologies.

== Hubs ==
=== Basel region ===
According to Le Temps, there are about 900 pharmaceutical and medtech companies (50,000 workers) in the region of Basel. The region of Zurich, mainly active in medical technologies employs 21,000 workers.

=== Lemanic region ===
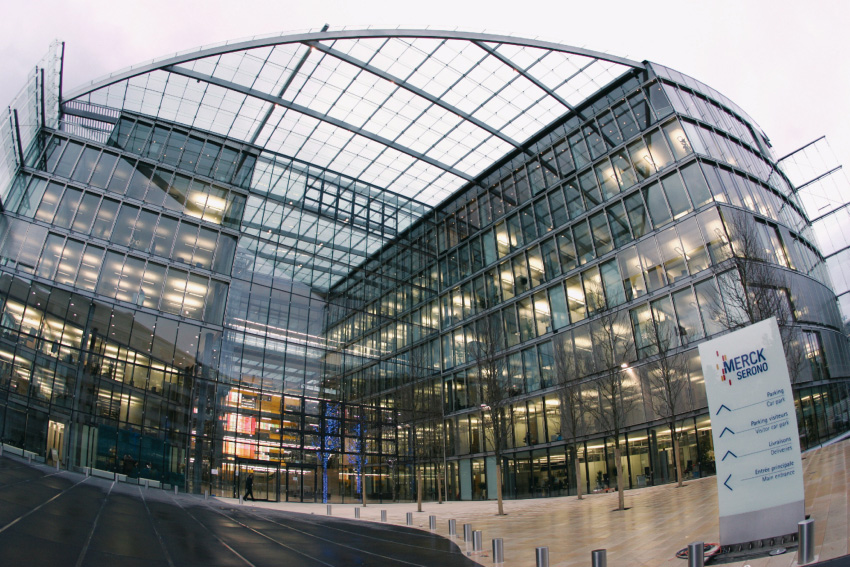
The former headquarters of Merck Serono in Geneva, which now hosts the Campus Biotech

According to L'Hebdo, there are 750 biotech and medtech companies (20,000 employees) in the Lemanic region. Among them, 450 companies develop and/or produce drugs. In addition to that, there are 500 laboratories from universities and university hospitals (in the Lemanic region).

== Statistics ==
As of 2023, some 350 companies were active in the pharmaceutical industry in Switzerland.

As of 2024, some 56,000 people work in the pharmaceutical industry, mostly at large multinational companies such as Novartis, Roche or Sandoz. The sector also employs around 250,000 people indirectly.

The pharma industry invests a third of the approximately CHF18 billion into R&D spent by the private sector as a whole (2023).

In 2025, Switzerland exported some CHF100 billion worth of pharma products, or 22% of its total exports by value.

In 2024, Switzerland exported pharma products stood behind of Germany but ahead of the United States in terms of total value.

In 2025, four drugs from Novartis and two from Roche were among the world’s 50 best-selling medicines.

Novartis and Roche have agreed to invest billions of dollars to increase their production in the United States, following tense negociations with the Trump administration in 2026.

== See also ==
- Economy of Switzerland, List of companies of Switzerland
- Science and technology in Switzerland
- European Federation of Pharmaceutical Industries and Associations, List of pharmaceutical companies
- List of largest European manufacturing companies by revenue, List of largest manufacturing companies by revenue
- Life Sciences Switzerland
- Health Valley
- Healthcare in Switzerland

== Bibliography ==
- (in French) Karl Lüönd, Principe actif: la connaissance. Passé et présent de l'industrie pharmaceutique suisse, Interpharma and éditions Neue Zürcher Zeitung, 2008.
