= Ypsomed Holding =

Swiss company

Ypsomed Holding, Inc.
- Native name: Ypsomed Holding AG
- Company type: Public
- Industry: Medical technology
- Founded: 2003; 23 years ago
- Founder: Willy Michel
- Headquarters: Switzerland
- Key people: Gilbert Achermann (Chairman; Simon Michel (CEO)
- Revenue: ▲US$928.3 million (2024)
- Number of employees: 2,800 (2025)
- Website: ypsomed.com

Ypsomed Holding Inc. (German pronunciation: [ˈʏp.soː.mɛd]) is a Swiss multinational medical technology company headquartered in Burgdorf, Switzerland. Founded in 2003, through the break up of Disetronic Group, founded by Willy Michel. Ypsomed specializes in developing and manufacturing injection and infusion systems for self-medication, primarily in the areas of diabetes care and biotechnology.

Products include devices like insulin pens, auto-injectors, and infusion pumps, which help patients manage chronic conditions more easily and independently. In 2025, Ypsomed employs 2,800+ employees and has an annual turnover of 728.9 million Swiss Francs ($928.3 million). The company is listed on SIX Swiss Exchange.
