= Yens =

- Municipality
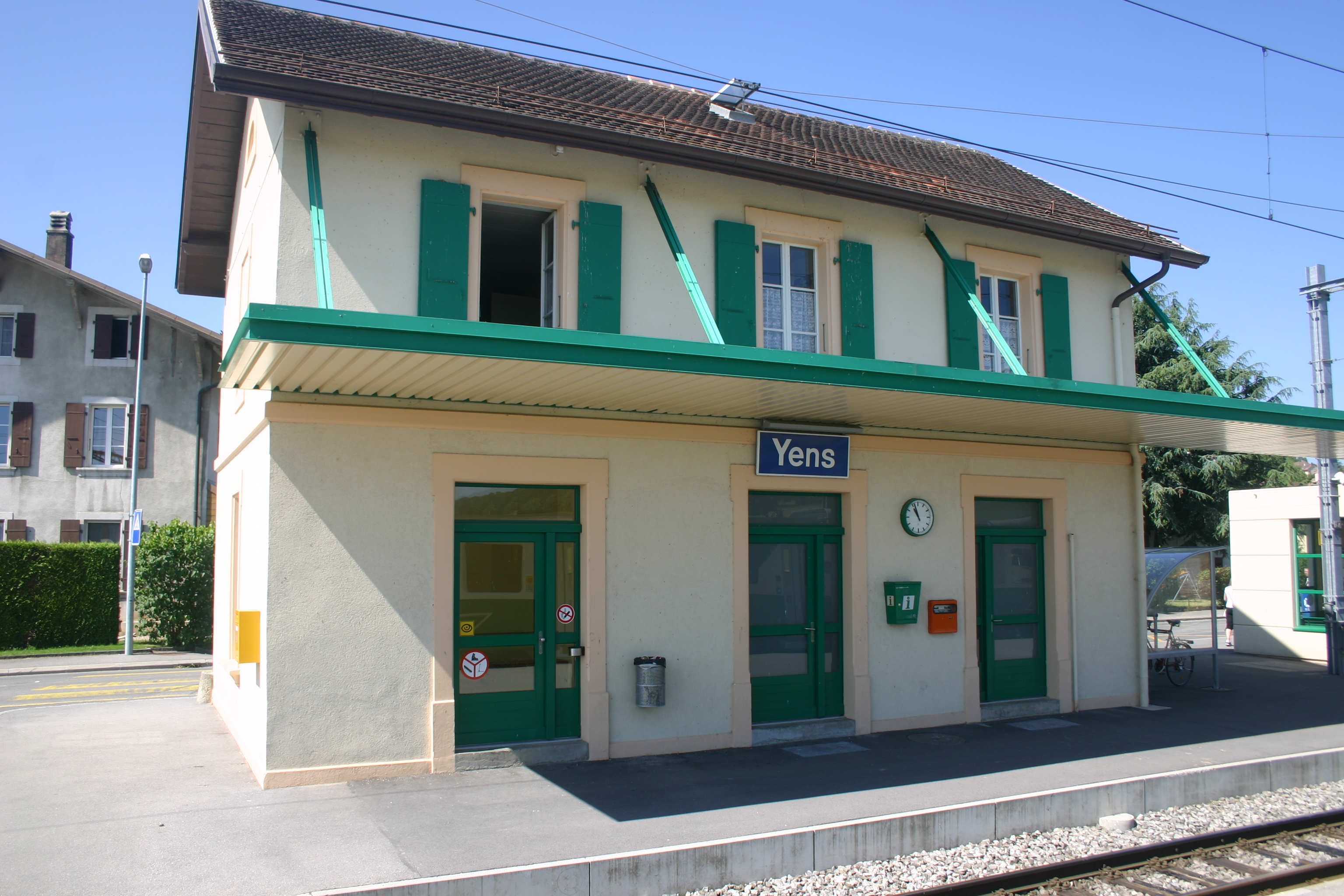
- Yens train station

- Flag Coat of arms
- Location of Yens
- Location within Switzerland Location within Canton of Vaud
- Coordinates: 46°31′N 06°25′E
- Country: Switzerland
- Canton: Vaud
- District: Morges

Government
  - Mayor: Syndic; Jean-Luc ANDRE

Area
  - Total: 9.52 km^{2} (3.68 sq mi)
- Elevation: 563 m (1,847 ft)

Population (2003)
  - Total: 989
  - Density: 104/km^{2} (269/sq mi)
- Time zone: UTC+01:00 (CET)
  - Summer (DST): UTC+02:00 (CEST)
- Postal code: 1169
- SFOS number: 5655
- ISO 3166 code: CH-VD
- Surrounded by: Apples, Ballens, Bière, Bussy-Chardonney, Denens, Lavigny, Saint-Livres, Villars-sous-Yens
- Website: www.yens.ch

Yens is a municipality in the Swiss canton of Vaud, located in the district of Morges.

== Geography ==
Yens has an area, as of 2009, of 9.5 square kilometers (3.7 mi^{2}). Of this area, 5.18 km^{2} (2.00 mi^{2}) or 54.5% is used for agricultural purposes, while 3.66 km^{2} (1.41 mi^{2}) or 38.5% is forested. Of the rest of the land, 0.7 km^{2} (0.27 mi^{2}) or 7.4% is settled (buildings or roads) and 0.02 km^{2} (4.9 acres) or 0.2% is unproductive land.

Of the built up area, housing and buildings made up 4.1% and transportation infrastructure made up 2.4%. Out of the forested land, 36.6% of the total land area is heavily forested and 1.9% is covered with orchards or small clusters of trees. Of the agricultural land, 39.5% is used for growing crops and 6.9% is pastures, while 8.0% is used for orchards or vine crops.

The municipality was part of the Morges District until it was dissolved on 31 August 2006, and Yens became part of the new district of Morges.

== Coat of arms ==
The blazon of the municipal coat of arms is Gules, a chevron enhanced and a chief argent.

== Demographics ==
Yens has a population (as of December 2020) of 1,479. As of 2008, 16.8% of the population are resident foreign nationals. Over the last 10 years (1999–2009 ) the population has changed at a rate of 11.3%. It has changed at a rate of 8.6% due to migration and at a rate of 2.9% due to births and deaths.

Most of the population (as of 2000) speaks French (853 or 88.4%), with German being second most common (40 or 4.1%) and Portuguese being third (26 or 2.7%). There are 4 people who speak Italian.

Of the population in the municipality 231 or about 23.9% were born in Yens and lived there in 2000. There were 355 or 36.8% who were born in the same canton, while 165 or 17.1% were born somewhere else in Switzerland, and 181 or 18.8% were born outside of Switzerland.

In 2008 there were 5 live births to Swiss citizens and were 6 deaths of Swiss citizens. Ignoring immigration and emigration, the population of Swiss citizens decreased by 1 while the foreign population remained the same. There was 1 Swiss man who emigrated from Switzerland and 2 Swiss women who immigrated back to Switzerland. At the same time, there were 12 non-Swiss men and 9 non-Swiss women who immigrated from another country to Switzerland. The total Swiss population change in 2008 (from all sources, including moves across municipal borders) was an increase of 8 and the non-Swiss population increased by 11 people. This represents a population growth rate of 1.9%.

The age distribution, as of 2009, in Yens is; 108 children or 10.4% of the population are between 0 and 9 years old and 150 teenagers or 14.4% are between 10 and 19. Of the adult population, 84 people or 8.1% of the population are between 20 and 29 years old. 138 people or 13.2% are between 30 and 39, 183 people or 17.5% are between 40 and 49, and 125 people or 12.0% are between 50 and 59. The senior population distribution is 151 people or 14.5% of the population are between 60 and 69 years old, 68 people or 6.5% are between 70 and 79, there are 34 people or 3.3% who are between 80 and 89, and there are 2 people or 0.2% who are 90 and older.

As of 2000, there were 372 people who were single and never married in the municipality. There were 490 married individuals, 56 widows or widowers and 47 individuals who are divorced.

As of 2000, there were 380 private households in the municipality, and an average of 2.5 persons per household. There were 111 households that consist of only one person and 33 households with five or more people. Out of a total of 391 households that answered this question, 28.4% were households made up of just one person and there were 2 adults who lived with their parents. Of the rest of the households, there are 109 married couples without children, 137 married couples with children. There were 16 single parents with a child or children. There were 5 households that were made up of unrelated people and 11 households that were made up of some sort of institution or another collective housing.

In 2000 there were 165 single family homes (or 63.0% of the total) out of a total of 262 inhabited buildings. There were 44 multi-family buildings (16.8%), along with 43 multi-purpose buildings that were mostly used for housing (16.4%) and 10 other use buildings (commercial or industrial) that also had some housing (3.8%). Of the single family homes 25 were built before 1919, while 22 were built between 1990 and 2000. The greatest number of single family homes (39) were built between 1971 and 1980. The most multi-family homes (21) were built before 1919 and the next most (5) were built between 1961 and 1970. There were 2 multi-family houses built between 1996 and 2000.

In 2000 there were 408 apartments in the municipality. The most common apartment size was 4 rooms of which there were 96. There were 17 single room apartments and 174 apartments with five or more rooms. Of these apartments, a total of 368 apartments (90.2% of the total) were permanently occupied, while 31 apartments (7.6%) were seasonally occupied and 9 apartments (2.2%) were empty. As of 2009, the construction rate of new housing units was 1 new units per 1000 residents. The vacancy rate for the municipality, in 2010, was 2.67%.

The historical population is given in the following chart:

== Sights ==
The entire village of Yens is designated as part of the Inventory of Swiss Heritage Sites.

== Politics ==
In the 2007 federal election the most popular party was the SVP which received 21.03% of the vote. The next three most popular parties were the SP (18.76%), the FDP (18.68%) and the Green Party (14.9%). In the federal election, a total of 345 votes were cast, and the voter turnout was 52.8%.

== Economy ==
As of 2010, Yens had an unemployment rate of 3.2%. As of 2008, there were 103 people employed in the primary economic sector and about 28 businesses involved in this sector. 136 people were employed in the secondary sector and there were 15 businesses in this sector. 100 people were employed in the tertiary sector, with 29 businesses in this sector. There were 507 residents of the municipality who were employed in some capacity, of which females made up 44.0% of the workforce.

In 2008 the total number of full-time equivalent jobs was 288. The number of jobs in the primary sector was 81, all of which were in agriculture. The number of jobs in the secondary sector was 128 of which 72 or (56.3%) were in manufacturing and 56 (43.8%) were in construction. The number of jobs in the tertiary sector was 79. In the tertiary sector; 31 or 39.2% were in wholesale or retail sales or the repair of motor vehicles, 1 was in the movement and storage of goods, 7 or 8.9% were in a hotel or restaurant, 5 or 6.3% were in the information industry, 4 or 5.1% were technical professionals or scientists, 5 or 6.3% were in education and 16 or 20.3% were in health care.

In 2000, there were 113 workers who commuted into the municipality and 341 workers who commuted away. The municipality is a net exporter of workers, with about 3.0 workers leaving the municipality for every one entering. Of the working population, 7.5% used public transportation to get to work, and 65.9% used a private car.

== Religion ==
From the 2000 census, 227 or 23.5% were Roman Catholic, while 538 or 55.8% belonged to the Swiss Reformed Church. Of the rest of the population, there were 9 members of an Orthodox church (or about 0.93% of the population), and there were 56 individuals (or about 5.80% of the population) who belonged to another Christian church. There were 11 (or about 1.14% of the population) who were Islamic. There were 3 individuals who were Buddhist and 3 individuals who belonged to another church. 115 (or about 11.92% of the population) belonged to no church, are agnostic or atheist, and 30 individuals (or about 3.11% of the population) did not answer the question.

== Education ==
In Yens about 321 or (33.3%) of the population have completed non-mandatory upper secondary education, and 201 or (20.8%) have completed additional higher education (either university or a Fachhochschule). Of the 201 who completed tertiary schooling, 55.2% were Swiss men, 29.9% were Swiss women, 8.0% were non-Swiss men and 7.0% were non-Swiss women.

In the 2009/2010 school year there were a total of 139 students in the Yens school district. In the Vaud cantonal school system, two years of non-obligatory pre-school are provided by the political districts. During the school year, the political district provided pre-school care for a total of 631 children of which 203 children (32.2%) received subsidized pre-school care. The canton's primary school program requires students to attend for four years. There were 68 students in the municipal primary school program. The obligatory lower secondary school program lasts for six years and there were 70 students in those schools. There was also 1 student who was home schooled or attended another non-traditional school.

As of 2000, there were 34 students in Yens who came from another municipality, while 118 residents attended schools outside the municipality.
