= Chigny, Switzerland =

Chigny
- Municipality
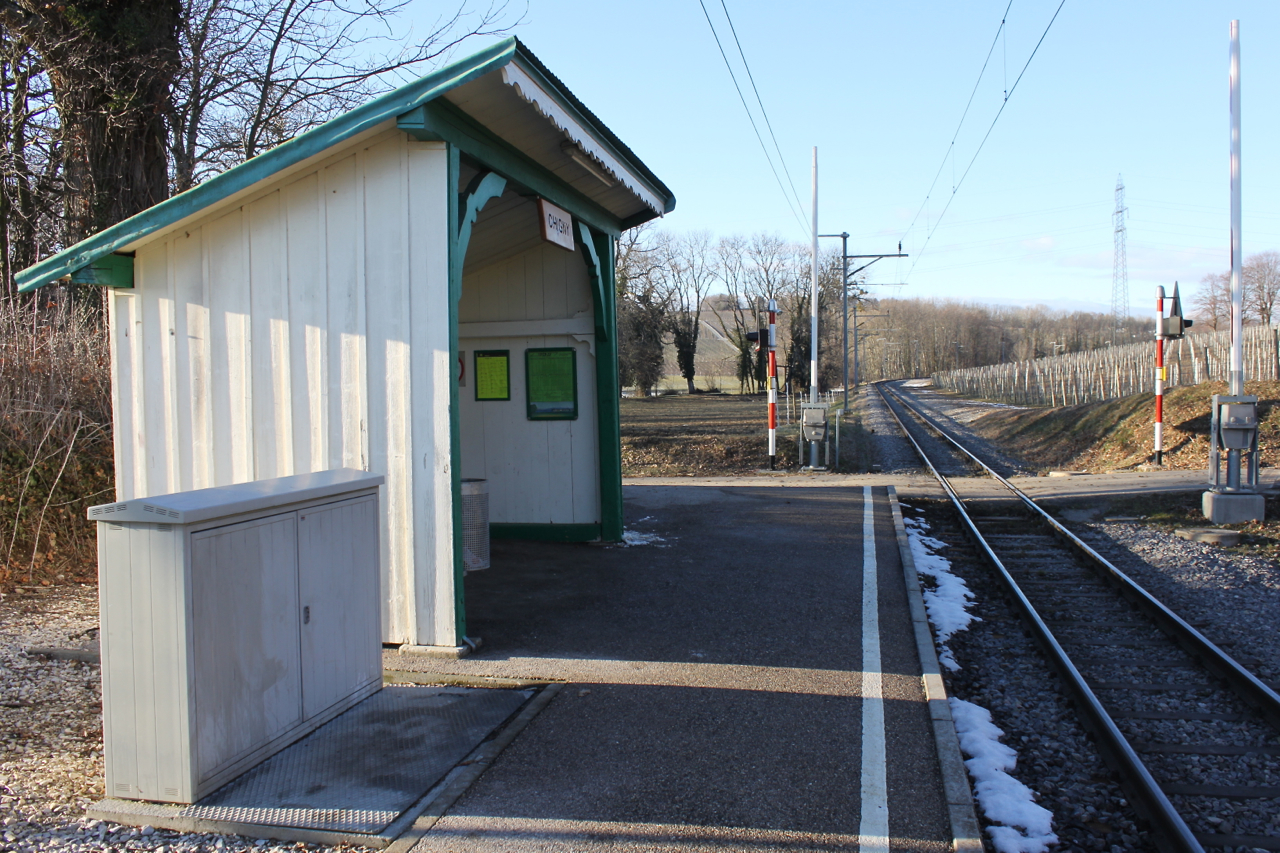

- Flag Coat of arms
- Location of Chigny
- Location within Switzerland Location within Canton of Vaud
- Coordinates: 46°31′N 06°29′E
- Country: Switzerland
- Canton: Vaud
- District: Morges

Government
  - Mayor: Syndic; Jean-Jacques de Luze (as of 2008)

Area
  - Total: 0.89 km^{2} (0.34 sq mi)
- Elevation: 445 m (1,460 ft)

Population (2003)
  - Total: 248
  - Density: 280/km^{2} (720/sq mi)
- Time zone: UTC+01:00 (CET)
  - Summer (DST): UTC+02:00 (CEST)
- Postal code: 1134
- SFOS number: 5628
- ISO 3166 code: CH-VD
- Surrounded by: Lully, Morges, Tolochenaz, Vufflens-le-Château
- Website: http://www.chigny.ch Profile (in French), SFSO statistics

Chigny (French pronunciation: [ʃiɲi]) is a municipality in the Swiss canton of Vaud, located in the district of Morges.

== History ==
Chigny is first mentioned in 1221 as Chinie.

== Geography ==
Chigny has an area, as of 2009, of 0.9 square kilometers (0.35 mi^{2}). Of this area, 0.66 km^{2} (0.25 mi^{2}) or 73.3% is used for agricultural purposes, while 0.06 km^{2} (0.023 mi^{2}) or 6.7% is forested. Of the rest of the land, 0.15 km^{2} (37 acres) or 16.7% is settled (buildings or roads).

Of the built up area, housing and buildings made up 10.0% and transportation infrastructure made up 6.7%. Out of the forested land, 5.6% of the total land area is heavily forested and 1.1% is covered with orchards or small clusters of trees. Of the agricultural land, 43.3% is used for growing crops and 1.1% is pastures, while 28.9% is used for orchards or vine crops.

The municipality was part of the old Morges District until it was dissolved on 31 August 2006, and Chigny became part of the new, expanded district of Morges.

The municipality is located on the right bank of the Morges river.

== Coat of arms ==
The blazon of the municipal coat of arms is Azure, a Chevron Argent between three Grapes Bunches two and one Or.

== Demographics ==
Chigny has a population (as of December 2020) of 396. As of 2008, 25.5% of the population are resident foreign nationals. Over the last 10 years (1999–2009 ) the population has changed at a rate of 9.5%. It has changed at a rate of 3.3% due to migration and at a rate of 5.5% due to births and deaths.

Most of the population (as of 2000) speaks French (220 or 85.3%), with English being second most common (11 or 4.3%) and German being third (9 or 3.5%). There are 3 people who speak Italian.

Of the population in the municipality 58 or about 22.5% were born in Chigny and lived there in 2000. There were 100 or 38.8% who were born in the same canton, while 37 or 14.3% were born somewhere else in Switzerland, and 62 or 24.0% were born outside of Switzerland.

In 2008 there were 2 live births to Swiss citizens and 2 births to non-Swiss citizens. Ignoring immigration and emigration, the population of Swiss citizens increased by 2 while the foreign population increased by 2. There was 1 Swiss woman who emigrated from Switzerland. The total Swiss population change in 2008 (from all sources, including moves across municipal borders) was a decrease of 6 and the non-Swiss population increased by 8 people. This represents a population growth rate of 0.7%.

The age distribution, as of 2009, in Chigny is; 37 children or 12.3% of the population are between 0 and 9 years old and 46 teenagers or 15.3% are between 10 and 19. Of the adult population, 40 people or 13.3% of the population are between 20 and 29 years old. 37 people or 12.3% are between 30 and 39, 49 people or 16.3% are between 40 and 49, and 49 people or 16.3% are between 50 and 59. The senior population distribution is 19 people or 6.3% of the population are between 60 and 69 years old, 19 people or 6.3% are between 70 and 79, there are 3 people or 1.0% who are between 80 and 89, and there are 2 people or 0.7% who are 90 and older.

As of 2000, there were 116 people who were single and never married in the municipality. There were 119 married individuals, 9 widows or widowers and 14 individuals who are divorced.

As of 2000, there were 95 private households in the municipality, and an average of 2.7 persons per household. There were 25 households that consist of only one person and 10 households with five or more people. Out of a total of 97 households that answered this question, 25.8% were households made up of just one person and there was 1 adult who lived with their parents. Of the rest of the households, there are 25 married couples without children, 36 married couples with children There were 7 single parents with a child or children. There was 1 household that was made up of unrelated people and 2 households that were made up of some sort of institution or another collective housing.

In 2000 there were 45 single family homes (or 66.2% of the total) out of a total of 68 inhabited buildings. There were 11 multi-family buildings (16.2%), along with 10 multi-purpose buildings that were mostly used for housing (14.7%) and 2 other use buildings (commercial or industrial) that also had some housing (2.9%). Of the single family homes 11 were built before 1919, while 9 were built between 1990 and 2000. The greatest number of multi-family homes (3) were built before 1919 and again between 1971 and 1980

In 2000 there were 104 apartments in the municipality. The most common apartment size was 3 rooms of which there were 23. There were 5 single room apartments and 50 apartments with five or more rooms. Of these apartments, a total of 94 apartments (90.4% of the total) were permanently occupied, while 9 apartments (8.7%) were seasonally occupied and one apartment was empty. As of 2009, the construction rate of new housing units was 10 new units per 1000 residents. The vacancy rate for the municipality, in 2010, was 1.63%.

The historical population is given in the following chart:

== Politics ==
In the 2007 federal election the most popular party was the SVP which received 21.37% of the vote. The next three most popular parties were the SP (18.23%), the Green Party (14.97%) and the Other (12.78%). In the federal election, a total of 91 votes were cast, and the voter turnout was 55.5%.

== Economy ==
As of 2010, Chigny had an unemployment rate of 4.5%. As of 2008, there were 25 people employed in the primary economic sector and about 3 businesses involved in this sector. 3 people were employed in the secondary sector and there were 2 businesses in this sector. 2 people were employed in the tertiary sector, with 2 businesses in this sector. There were 119 residents of the municipality who were employed in some capacity, of which females made up 49.6% of the workforce.

In 2008 the total number of full-time equivalent jobs was 18. The number of jobs in the primary sector was 14, all of which were in agriculture. The number of jobs in the secondary sector was 2, both in manufacturing. The number of jobs in the tertiary sector was 2, of which 1 was in the movement and storage of goods.

In 2000, there were 24 workers who commuted into the municipality and 97 workers who commuted away. The municipality is a net exporter of workers, with about 4.0 workers leaving the municipality for every one entering. About 16.7% of the workforce coming into Chigny are coming from outside Switzerland. Of the working population, 13.4% used public transportation to get to work, and 66.4% used a private car.

Chigny has a station on the Bière–Apples–Morges railway.

== Religion ==
From the 2000 census, 63 or 24.4% were Roman Catholic, while 130 or 50.4% belonged to the Swiss Reformed Church. Of the rest of the population, there were 2 members of an Orthodox church (or about 0.78% of the population), and there were 7 individuals (or about 2.71% of the population) who belonged to another Christian church. There were 16 (or about 6.20% of the population) who were Islamic. 41 (or about 15.89% of the population) belonged to no church, are agnostic or atheist, and 1 individuals (or about 0.39% of the population) did not answer the question.

== Education ==
In Chigny about 78 or (30.2%) of the population have completed non-mandatory upper secondary education, and 60 or (23.3%) have completed additional higher education (either university or a Fachhochschule). Of the 60 who completed tertiary schooling, 55.0% were Swiss men, 28.3% were Swiss women, 11.7% were non-Swiss men.

In the 2009/2010 school year there were a total of 32 students in the Chigny school district. In the Vaud cantonal school system, two years of non-obligatory pre-school are provided by the political districts. During the school year, the political district provided pre-school care for a total of 631 children of which 203 children (32.2%) received subsidized pre-school care. The canton's primary school program requires students to attend for four years. There were 19 students in the municipal primary school program. The obligatory lower secondary school program lasts for six years and there were 13 students in those schools.

As of 2000, there were 66 students from Chigny who attended schools outside the municipality.
