= Villars-sous-Yens =

- Municipality
- Flag Coat of arms
- Location of Villars-sous-Yens
- Location within Switzerland Location within Canton of Vaud
- Coordinates: 46°31′N 06°26′E
- Country: Switzerland
- Canton: Vaud
- District: Morges

Government
  - Mayor: Syndic; Daniel Leuba

Area
  - Total: 3.0 km^{2} (1.2 sq mi)
- Elevation: 481 m (1,578 ft)

Population (2003)
  - Total: 562
  - Density: 190/km^{2} (490/sq mi)
- Time zone: UTC+01:00 (CET)
  - Summer (DST): UTC+02:00 (CEST)
- Postal code: 1168
- SFOS number: 5652
- ISO 3166 code: CH-VD
- Surrounded by: Denens, Etoy, Lavigny, Lussy-sur-Morges, Saint-Prex, Yens
- Website: www.villars-sous-yens.ch

Villars-sous-Yens is a municipality in the Swiss canton of Vaud, located in the district of Morges.

== Geography ==
Villars-sous-Yens has an area, as of 2009, of 3 square kilometers (1.2 mi^{2}). Of this area, 2.33 km^{2} (0.90 mi^{2}) or 76.6% is used for agricultural purposes, while 0.5 km^{2} (0.19 mi^{2}) or 16.4% is forested. Of the rest of the land, 0.2 km^{2} (0.077 mi^{2}) or 6.6% is settled (buildings or roads).

Of the built up area, housing and buildings made up 2.6% and transportation infrastructure made up 3.0%. Out of the forested land, 13.5% of the total land area is heavily forested and 3.0% is covered with orchards or small clusters of trees. Of the agricultural land, 59.2% is used for growing crops and 5.9% is pastures, while 11.5% is used for orchards or vine crops.

The municipality was part of the Morges District until it was dissolved on 31 August 2006, and Villars-sous-Yens became part of the new district of Morges.

== Coat of arms ==
The blazon of the municipal coat of arms is Vert, a letter V Argent.

== Demographics ==
Villars-sous-Yens has a population (as of December 2020) of 612. As of 2008, 10.4% of the population are resident foreign nationals. Over the last 10 years (1999–2009) the population has changed at a rate of 6.6%. It has changed at a rate of 1.5% due to migration and at a rate of 5.5% due to births and deaths.

Most of the population (as of 2000) speaks French (519 or 92.7%), with German being second most common (18 or 3.2%) and English being third (5 or 0.9%). There are 2 people who speak Italian.

Of the population in the municipality 121 or about 21.6% were born in Villars-sous-Yens and lived there in 2000. There were 254 or 45.4% who were born in the same canton, while 89 or 15.9% were born somewhere else in Switzerland, and 84 or 15.0% were born outside of Switzerland.

In 2008 there were 6 live births to Swiss citizens and 1 death of a Swiss citizen. Ignoring immigration and emigration, the population of Swiss citizens increased by 5 while the foreign population remained the same. There were 2 Swiss men and 3 Swiss women who emigrated from Switzerland. At the same time, there were 4 non-Swiss men and 6 non-Swiss women who immigrated from another country to Switzerland. The total Swiss population change in 2008 (from all sources, including moves across municipal borders) was a decrease of 1 and the non-Swiss population increased by 12 people. This represents a population growth rate of 2.0%.

The age distribution, as of 2009, in Villars-sous-Yens is; 71 children or 12.2% of the population are between 0 and 9 years old and 94 teenagers or 16.2% are between 10 and 19. Of the adult population, 59 people or 10.1% of the population are between 20 and 29 years old. 76 people or 13.1% are between 30 and 39, 114 people or 19.6% are between 40 and 49, and 70 people or 12.0% are between 50 and 59. The senior population distribution is 50 people or 8.6% of the population are between 60 and 69 years old, 34 people or 5.8% are between 70 and 79, there are 11 people or 1.9% who are between 80 and 89, and there are 3 people or 0.5% who are 90 and older.

As of 2000, there were 258 people who were single and never married in the municipality. There were 253 married individuals, 21 widows or widowers and 28 individuals who are divorced.

As of 2000, there were 206 private households in the municipality, and an average of 2.7 persons per household. There were 50 households that consist of only one person and 20 households with five or more people. Out of a total of 209 households that answered this question, 23.9% were households made up of just one person and there was 1 adult who lived with their parents. Of the rest of the households, there are 50 married couples without children, 90 married couples with children There were 8 single parents with a child or children. There were 7 households that were made up of unrelated people and 3 households that were made up of some sort of institution or another collective housing.

In 2000 there were 75 single family homes (or 60.5% of the total) out of a total of 124 inhabited buildings. There were 27 multi-family buildings (21.8%), along with 21 multi-purpose buildings that were mostly used for housing (16.9%) and 1 other use buildings (commercial or industrial) that also had some housing (0.8%). Of the single family homes 29 were built before 1919, while 22 were built between 1990 and 2000. The most multi-family homes (12) were built before 1919 and the next most (3) were built between 1919 and 1945. There were 2 multi-family houses built between 1996 and 2000.

In 2000 there were 211 apartments in the municipality. The most common apartment size was 4 rooms of which there were 64. There were 3 single room apartments and 76 apartments with five or more rooms. Of these apartments, a total of 199 apartments (94.3% of the total) were permanently occupied, while 9 apartments (4.3%) were seasonally occupied and 3 apartments (1.4%) were empty. As of 2009, the construction rate of new housing units was 10.3 new units per 1000 residents. The vacancy rate for the municipality, in 2010, was 1.78%.

The historical population is given in the following chart:

== Politics ==
In the 2007 federal election the most popular party was the SVP which received 23.43% of the vote. The next three most popular parties were the Green Party (17.11%), the SP (16.79%) and the LPS Party (12.09%). In the federal election, a total of 181 votes were cast, and the voter turnout was 50.1%.

== Economy ==
As of 2010, Villars-sous-Yens had an unemployment rate of 1.8%. As of 2008, there were 59 people employed in the primary economic sector and about 12 businesses involved in this sector. 5 people were employed in the secondary sector and there was 1 business in this sector. 40 people were employed in the tertiary sector, with 14 businesses in this sector. There were 296 residents of the municipality who were employed in some capacity, of which females made up 43.9% of the workforce.

In 2008 the total number of full-time equivalent jobs was 71. The number of jobs in the primary sector was 32, all of which were in agriculture. The number of jobs in the secondary sector was 5, all of which were in manufacturing. The number of jobs in the tertiary sector was 34. In the tertiary sector; 3 or 8.8% were in wholesale or retail sales or the repair of motor vehicles, 5 or 14.7% were in a hotel or restaurant, 1 was in the information industry, 9 or 26.5% were technical professionals or scientists, 1 was in education.

In 2000, there were 11 workers who commuted into the municipality and 229 workers who commuted away. The municipality is a net exporter of workers, with about 20.8 workers leaving the municipality for every one entering. Of the working population, 11.1% used public transportation to get to work, and 69.3% used a private car.

== Religion ==
From the 2000 census, 135 or 24.1% were Roman Catholic, while 301 or 53.8% belonged to the Swiss Reformed Church. Of the rest of the population, there was 1 member of an Orthodox church, and there were 12 individuals (or about 2.14% of the population) who belonged to another Christian church. There were 3 individuals (or about 0.54% of the population) who were Jewish, and there was 1 individual who was Islamic. There was 1 person who was Buddhist, 1 person who was Hindu and 3 individuals who belonged to another church. 87 (or about 15.54% of the population) belonged to no church, are agnostic or atheist, and 21 individuals (or about 3.75% of the population) did not answer the question.

== Education ==
In Villars-sous-Yens about 194 or (34.6%) of the population have completed non-mandatory upper secondary education, and 114 or (20.4%) have completed additional higher education (either university or a Fachhochschule). Of the 114 who completed tertiary schooling, 52.6% were Swiss men, 26.3% were Swiss women, 10.5% were non-Swiss men and 10.5% were non-Swiss women.

In the 2009/2010 school year there were a total of 82 students in the Villars-sous-Yens school district. In the Vaud cantonal school system, two years of non-obligatory pre-school are provided by the political districts. During the school year, the political district provided pre-school care for a total of 631 children of which 203 children (32.2%) received subsidized pre-school care. The canton's primary school program requires students to attend for four years. There were 38 students in the municipal primary school program. The obligatory lower secondary school program lasts for six years and there were 44 students in those schools.

As of 2000, there were 36 students in Villars-sous-Yens who came from another municipality, while 88 residents attended schools outside the municipality.
