= Health Valley =

Biomedical sector in the Lake Geneva Region

The Health Valley covers the Western Switzerland region, where the life sciences sector extends from Geneva to Bern, including the seven cantons of Bern, Fribourg, Geneva, Jura, Neuchâtel, Valais, and Vaud. This cluster presents a critical mass of 1,900 companies, research centers, and innovation support structures, now representing more than 40,000 employees. The Health Valley strives to animate the life sciences ecosystem of the region by establishing thriving bridges between its ambassadors.

The name of the Health Valley is inspired by that of Silicon Valley in California, United States (where the focus is on information technology). According to the Swiss newspaper Le Temps, there were nearly 1,000 biotech and medtech companies in the Health Valley in 2017, employing 25,000 people.

The Health Valley network is led by BioAlps, an association funded by the 7 cantons of Western Switzerland and 17 academic members such as EPFL, UNIL, UNINE, UNIGE, HES-SO, School of Engineering HES-SO Valais , HEIG-VD, HEPIA, UNIFR, CHUV, HUG, CSEM, SIB. Its mission is to represent the whole ecosystem and to foster synergies between all the actors.

A digital interactive map, a project led in 2016 by the Fondation Inartis, of the regional actors is located at healthvalley.ch.

According to a Swiss journalist, the idea of a Health Valley was actively supported by Patrick Aebischer during his tenure as president of the Swiss Federal Institute of Technology in Lausanne/EPFL (2000–2016). Notably, Aebischer promoted teaching and research in life sciences while deepening cooperation with Lausanne University Hospital/CHUV.

Biotech expert Jürg Zürcher argues that Switzerland as a whole constitutes a cluster, with the Basel BioValley employing 50,000 people and the Zurich region employing 21,000. "Together, these three regions form the densest network of biotech firms anywhere in the world", Swiss Info notes, with over 40% of the world's pharmaceutical companies in the Basel region alone. Foreign competing clusters include the Oxford-Cambridge London cluster in the United Kingdom, the Boston, San Francisco, and San Diego clusters in the United States, as well as emerging ones in India (Hyderabad, Bangalore, New Delhi) and China (Shanghai, Shenzhen).

== See also ==
- General : Science and technology in Switzerland, Pharmaceutical industry in Switzerland
- Places : Swiss Innovation Park, Campus Biotech, UniverCité, Espace Création
- Academic institutions : École Polytechnique Fédérale de Lausanne, University of Geneva, SICHH, Swiss Institute of Bioinformatics, Université de Lausanne, Wyss Center for bio and neuro-engineering
- Companies : Abionic - AC Immune - ALRO Engineering SA - Altran - Anecova - Bachem - Bracco - Celgene - Covance - CSL Behring - Debiopharm - Eli Lilly - EspeRare - Ferring Pharmaceuticals - Glenmark Pharmaceuticals - Haleon - IBM - IE Life Science Engineering - Incyte – Iqone Healthcare - Lonza - MayBa.ch - - Merck - NV Logistics - Regen Lab - Socar Research - Socorex - Sophia Genetics - Sunstar - Symbios - Symetis - TRB Chemedica - UCB - Valsynthèse
- Support: A3P Suisse - Banque Cantonale du Valais - BioAlps - Biopôle - Campus Biotech - Espace Création - Etat de Neuchâtel - EY - Gevers - GGBa - Inartis Network - Innovaud - Katzarov - Kessler - Lausanne Region - MedC. Partners - Medical Cluster - Promotion économique du Canton de Berne - Salon EPHJ-EPMT-SMT - SICHH - The Ark - UniverCité - Voisin Life Sciences Consulting
- Hospitals : CHUV - Clinique de la Source - Clinique Romande de réadaptation - HUG - Institut de recherche en réadaptation-réinsertion
- People : Prof. Benoît Dubuis, Ernesto Bertarelli, Hansjörg Wyss
