= Lully, Vaud =

Lully
- Municipality
- Flag Coat of arms
- Location of Lully
- Location within Switzerland Location within Canton of Vaud
- Coordinates: 46°30′N 6°28′E
- Country: Switzerland
- Canton: Vaud
- District: Morges

Government
  - Mayor: Syndic; Mark Winges

Area
  - Total: 2.06 km^{2} (0.80 sq mi)
- Elevation: 422 m (1,385 ft)

Population (2000)
  - Total: 669
  - Density: 325/km^{2} (841/sq mi)
- Demonym: Les Lulliérans
- Time zone: UTC+01:00 (CET)
  - Summer (DST): UTC+02:00 (CEST)
- Postal code: 1132
- SFOS number: 5639
- ISO 3166 code: CH-VD
- Surrounded by: Chigny, Denens, Lussy-sur-Morges, Saint-Prex, Tolochenaz, Vufflens-le-Château
- Website: http://www.lully.ch Profile (in French), SFSO statistics

Lully is a municipality in the Swiss canton of Vaud, located in the district of Morges.

== History ==
Lully is first mentioned in 1018 as Lulliacum.

== Geography ==
Lully has an area, as of 2009, of 2.1 square kilometers (0.81 mi^{2}). Of this area, 1.33 km^{2} (0.51 mi^{2}) or 64.9% is used for agricultural purposes, while 0.26 km^{2} (0.10 mi^{2}) or 12.7% is forested. Of the rest of the land, 0.42 km^{2} (0.16 mi^{2}) or 20.5% is settled (buildings or roads) and 0.01 km^{2} (2.5 acres) or 0.5% is unproductive land.

Of the built up area, housing and buildings made up 13.7% and transportation infrastructure made up 6.3%. Out of the forested land, all of the forested land area is covered with heavy forests. Of the agricultural land, 42.4% is used for growing crops and 4.4% is pastures, while 18.0% is used for orchards or vine crops.

The municipality was part of the Morges District until it was dissolved on 31 August 2006, and Lully became part of the new district of Morges.

The municipality is located westward of the Morges river. It consists of the village of Lully and the hamlet of Sécheron.

== Coat of arms ==
The blazon of the municipal coat of arms is Azure, a Bend Or and a Cross bottony Argent.

== Demographics ==
Lully has a population (as of December 2020) of 823. As of 2008, 16.4% of the population are resident foreign nationals. Over the last 10 years (1999–2009 ) the population has changed at a rate of 16%. It has changed at a rate of 10.4% due to migration and at a rate of 6.1% due to births and deaths.

Most of the population (as of 2000) speaks French (566 or 85.4%), with German being second most common (46 or 6.9%) and English being third (19 or 2.9%). There are 6 people who speak Italian.

Of the population in the municipality 114 or about 17.2% were born in Lully and lived there in 2000. There were 286 or 43.1% who were born in the same canton, while 121 or 18.3% were born somewhere else in Switzerland, and 118 or 17.8% were born outside of Switzerland.

In 2008 there were 8 live births to Swiss citizens and 2 births to non-Swiss citizens, and in same time span there was 1 death of a Swiss citizen. Ignoring immigration and emigration, the population of Swiss citizens increased by 7 while the foreign population increased by 2. There were 2 Swiss women who immigrated back to Switzerland. At the same time, there were 7 non-Swiss men and 5 non-Swiss women who immigrated from another country to Switzerland. The total Swiss population change in 2008 (from all sources, including moves across municipal borders) was an increase of 10 and the non-Swiss population increased by 16 people. This represents a population growth rate of 3.4%.

The age distribution, as of 2009, in Lully is; 89 children or 11.4% of the population are between 0 and 9 years old and 139 teenagers or 17.8% are between 10 and 19. Of the adult population, 81 people or 10.4% of the population are between 20 and 29 years old. 101 people or 13.0% are between 30 and 39, 119 people or 15.3% are between 40 and 49, and 103 people or 13.2% are between 50 and 59. The senior population distribution is 86 people or 11.0% of the population are between 60 and 69 years old, 38 people or 4.9% are between 70 and 79, there are 16 people or 2.1% who are between 80 and 89, and there are 7 people or 0.9% who are 90 and older.

As of 2000, there were 288 people who were single and never married in the municipality. There were 334 married individuals, 21 widows or widowers and 20 individuals who are divorced.

As of 2000, there were 236 private households in the municipality, and an average of 2.7 persons per household. There were 47 households that consist of only one person and 34 households with five or more people. Out of a total of 242 households that answered this question, 19.4% were households made up of just one person. Of the rest of the households, there are 64 married couples without children, 105 married couples with children There were 15 single parents with a child or children. There were 5 households that were made up of unrelated people and 6 households that were made up of some sort of institution or another collective housing.

In 2000 there were 126 single family homes (or 69.6% of the total) out of a total of 181 inhabited buildings. There were 27 multi-family buildings (14.9%), along with 22 multi-purpose buildings that were mostly used for housing (12.2%) and 6 other use buildings (commercial or industrial) that also had some housing (3.3%). Of the single family homes 15 were built before 1919, while 24 were built between 1990 and 2000. The greatest number of single family homes (36) were built between 1971 and 1980. The most multi-family homes (10) were built between 1961 and 1970 and the next most (8) were built before 1919. There were 2 multi-family houses built between 1996 and 2000.

In 2000 there were 251 apartments in the municipality. The most common apartment size was 4 rooms of which there were 64. There were 8 single room apartments and 128 apartments with five or more rooms. Of these apartments, a total of 226 apartments (90.0% of the total) were permanently occupied, while 16 apartments (6.4%) were seasonally occupied and 9 apartments (3.6%) were empty. As of 2009, the construction rate of new housing units was 0 new units per 1000 residents. The vacancy rate for the municipality, in 2010, was 0%.

The historical population is given in the following chart:

== Politics ==
In the 2007 federal election the most popular party was the Green Party which received 19.74% of the vote. The next three most popular parties were the SVP (18.59%), the SP (17.79%) and the FDP (13.48%). In the federal election, a total of 251 votes were cast, and the voter turnout was 54.0%.

== Economy ==
As of 2010, Lully had an unemployment rate of 2.6%. As of 2008, there were 29 people employed in the primary economic sector and about 10 businesses involved in this sector. 6 people were employed in the secondary sector and there were 4 businesses in this sector. 60 people were employed in the tertiary sector, with 22 businesses in this sector. There were 331 residents of the municipality who were employed in some capacity, of which females made up 45.3% of the workforce.

In 2008 the total number of full-time equivalent jobs was 67. The number of jobs in the primary sector was 20, all of which were in agriculture. The number of jobs in the secondary sector was 6 of which 5 or (83.3%) were in manufacturing and 1 was in construction. The number of jobs in the tertiary sector was 41. In the tertiary sector; 7 or 17.1% were in wholesale or retail sales or the repair of motor vehicles, 1 was in the movement and storage of goods, 11 or 26.8% were technical professionals or scientists, 5 or 12.2% were in education and 14 or 34.1% were in health care.

In 2000, there were 36 workers who commuted into the municipality and 254 workers who commuted away. The municipality is a net exporter of workers, with about 7.1 workers leaving the municipality for every one entering. Of the working population, 10.3% used public transportation to get to work, and 71.3% used a private car.

== Religion ==
From the 2000 census, 188 or 28.4% were Roman Catholic, while 288 or 43.4% belonged to the Swiss Reformed Church. Of the rest of the population, there were 7 members of an Orthodox church (or about 1.06% of the population), there was 1 individual who belongs to the Christian Catholic Church, and there were 38 individuals (or about 5.73% of the population) who belonged to another Christian church. There was 1 individual who was Islamic. There was 1 person who was Hindu. 113 (or about 17.04% of the population) belonged to no church, are agnostic or atheist, and 43 individuals (or about 6.49% of the population) did not answer the question.

== Education ==
In Lully about 221 or (33.3%) of the population have completed non-mandatory upper secondary education, and 159 or (24.0%) have completed additional higher education (either university or a Fachhochschule). Of the 159 who completed tertiary schooling, 55.3% were Swiss men, 29.6% were Swiss women, 9.4% were non-Swiss men and 5.7% were non-Swiss women.

In the 2009/2010 school year there were a total of 114 students in the Lully (VD) school district. In the Vaud cantonal school system, two years of non-obligatory pre-school are provided by the political districts. During the school year, the political district provided pre-school care for a total of 631 children of which 203 children (32.2%) received subsidized pre-school care. The canton's primary school program requires students to attend for four years. There were 60 students in the municipal primary school program. The obligatory lower secondary school program lasts for six years and there were 54 students in those schools.

As of 2000, there were 33 students in Lully who came from another municipality, while 126 residents attended schools outside the municipality.
