= Lussy-sur-Morges =

- Municipality
- Flag Coat of arms
- Location of Lussy-sur-Morges
- Location within Switzerland Location within Canton of Vaud
- Coordinates: 46°30′N 06°27′E
- Country: Switzerland
- Canton: Vaud
- District: Morges

Government
  - Mayor: Syndic; Pierre Jaberg

Area
  - Total: 2.33 km^{2} (0.90 sq mi)
- Elevation: 458 m (1,503 ft)

Population (2004)
  - Total: 562
  - Density: 241/km^{2} (625/sq mi)
- Time zone: UTC+01:00 (CET)
  - Summer (DST): UTC+02:00 (CEST)
- Postal code: 1167
- SFOS number: 5640
- ISO 3166 code: CH-VD
- Surrounded by: Denens, Lully, Saint-Prex, Villars-sous-Yens
- Website: www.lussy-sur-morges.ch

Lussy-sur-Morges is a municipality in the Swiss canton of Vaud, located in the Morges district.

== History ==
Lussy-sur-Morges is first mentioned in 1026 as in villa Luciaco.

== Geography ==
Aerial view (1958)

Lussy-sur-Morges has an area, as of 2009, of 2.3 square kilometers (0.89 mi^{2}). Of this area, 1.75 km^{2} (0.68 mi^{2}) or 74.8% is used for agricultural purposes, while 0.31 km^{2} (0.12 mi^{2}) or 13.2% is forested. Of the rest of the land, 0.28 km^{2} (0.11 mi^{2}) or 12.0% is settled (buildings or roads), 0.02 km^{2} (4.9 acres) or 0.9% is either rivers or lakes.

Of the built up area, housing and buildings made up 9.0% and transportation infrastructure made up 2.1%. Out of the forested land, all of the forested land area is covered with heavy forests. Of the agricultural land, 58.5% is used for growing crops and 5.6% is pastures, while 10.7% is used for orchards or vine crops. All the water in the municipality is flowing water.

The municipality was part of the Morges District until it was dissolved on 31 August 2006, and Lussy-sur-Morges became part of the new district of Morges.

It consists of the village of Lussy-sur-Morges and the hamlet of Coinsin, which was known in the 15th and 16th Centuries as Saint-André.

== Coat of arms ==
The blazon of the municipal coat of arms is Per pale: 1. Gules, a Cross bottony Argent; Azure, a Key Or.

== Demographics ==
Lussy-sur-Morges has a population (as of December 2020) of 722. As of 2008, 15.4% of the population are resident foreign nationals. Over the last 10 years (1999–2009 ) the population has changed at a rate of 0.3%. It has changed at a rate of 7.9% due to migration and at a rate of -7.2% due to births and deaths.

Most of the population (as of 2000) speaks French (507 or 87.7%), with German being second most common (26 or 4.5%) and English being third (20 or 3.5%). There are 3 people who speak Italian.

Of the population in the municipality 124 or about 21.5% were born in Lussy-sur-Morges and lived there in 2000. There were 217 or 37.5% who were born in the same canton, while 110 or 19.0% were born somewhere else in Switzerland, and 118 or 20.4% were born outside of Switzerland.

In 2008 there were 3 live births to Swiss citizens and 1 birth to non-Swiss citizens, and in same time span there were 4 deaths of Swiss citizens. Ignoring immigration and emigration, the population of Swiss citizens decreased by 1 while the foreign population increased by 1. There was 1 Swiss woman who immigrated back to Switzerland. At the same time, there was 3 non-Swiss women who immigrated from another country to Switzerland. The total Swiss population remained the same in 2008 and the non-Swiss population increased by 6 people. This represents a population growth rate of 1.1%.

The age distribution, as of 2009, in Lussy-sur-Morges is; 67 children or 11.5% of the population are between 0 and 9 years old and 87 teenagers or 15.0% are between 10 and 19. Of the adult population, 50 people or 8.6% of the population are between 20 and 29 years old. 58 people or 10.0% are between 30 and 39, 97 people or 16.7% are between 40 and 49, and 83 people or 14.3% are between 50 and 59. The senior population distribution is 78 people or 13.4% of the population are between 60 and 69 years old, 40 people or 6.9% are between 70 and 79, there are 17 people or 2.9% who are between 80 and 89, and there are 4 people or 0.7% who are 90 and older.

As of 2000, there were 229 people who were single and never married in the municipality. There were 298 married individuals, 27 widows or widowers and 24 individuals who are divorced.

As of 2000, there were 189 private households in the municipality, and an average of 2.9 persons per household. There were 30 households that consist of only one person and 23 households with five or more people. Out of a total of 193 households that answered this question, 15.5% were households made up of just one person. Of the rest of the households, there are 56 married couples without children, 95 married couples with children There were 6 single parents with a child or children. There were 2 households that were made up of unrelated people and 4 households that were made up of some sort of institution or another collective housing.

In 2000 there were 75 single-family homes (or 61.0% of the total) out of a total of 123 inhabited buildings. There were 27 multi-family buildings (22.0%), along with 13 multi-purpose buildings that were mostly used for housing (10.6%) and 8 other use buildings (commercial or industrial) that also had some housing (6.5%). Of the single-family homes 9 were built before 1919, while 8 were built between 1990 and 2000. The greatest number of single-family homes (30) were built between 1981 and 1990. The most multi-family homes (9) were built before 1919 and the next most (4) were built between 1981 and 1990. There were 3 multi-family houses built between 1996 and 2000.

In 2000 there were 189 apartments in the municipality. The most common apartment size was 4 rooms of which there were 59. There were 5 single-room apartments and 88 apartments with five or more rooms. Of these apartments, a total of 176 apartments (93.1% of the total) were permanently occupied, while 8 apartments (4.2%) were seasonally occupied and 5 apartments (2.6%) were empty. As of 2009, the construction rate of new housing units was 12 new units per 1000 residents. The vacancy rate for the municipality, in 2010, was 0%.

The historical population is given in the following chart:

== Politics ==
In the 2007 federal election the most popular party was the SVP which received 22.87% of the vote. The next three most popular parties were the SP (19.1%), the Green Party (14.39%) and the FDP (10.73%). In the federal election, a total of 176 votes were cast, and the voter turnout was 48.6%.

== Economy ==
As of 2010, Lussy-sur-Morges had an unemployment rate of 2.3%. As of 2008, there were 31 people employed in the primary economic sector and about 7 businesses involved in this sector. 32 people were employed in the secondary sector and there were 6 businesses in this sector. 123 people were employed in the tertiary sector, with 23 businesses in this sector. There were 269 residents of the municipality who were employed in some capacity, of which females made up 40.9% of the workforce.

In 2008 the total number of full-time equivalent jobs was 150. The number of jobs in the primary sector was 17, all of which were in agriculture. The number of jobs in the secondary sector was 28 of which 2 or (7.1%) were in manufacturing and 26 (92.9%) were in construction. The number of jobs in the tertiary sector was 105. In the tertiary sector; 17 or 16.2% were in wholesale or retail sales or the repair of motor vehicles, 5 or 4.8% were in the movement and storage of goods, 11 or 10.5% were in a hotel or restaurant, 1 was the insurance or financial industry, 27 or 25.7% were technical professionals or scientists, 1 was in education and 35 or 33.3% were in health care.

In 2000, there were 95 workers who commuted into the municipality and 206 workers who commuted away. The municipality is a net exporter of workers, with about 2.2 workers leaving the municipality for every one entering. About 5.3% of the workforce coming into Lussy-sur-Morges are coming from outside Switzerland. Of the working population, 10.8% used public transportation to get to work, and 66.2% used a private car.

== Religion ==
From the 2000 census, 152 or 26.3% were Roman Catholic, while 285 or 49.3% belonged to the Swiss Reformed Church. Of the rest of the population, there were 6 members of an Orthodox church (or about 1.04% of the population), and there were 73 individuals (or about 12.63% of the population) who belonged to another Christian church. There was 1 individual who was Jewish, and there was 1 individual who was Islamic. There were 2 individuals who were Buddhist. 70 (or about 12.11% of the population) belonged to no church, are agnostic or atheist, and 24 individuals (or about 4.15% of the population) did not answer the question.

== Education ==
In Lussy-sur-Morges about 188 or (32.5%) of the population have completed non-mandatory upper secondary education, and 133 or (23.0%) have completed additional higher education (either university or a Fachhochschule). Of the 133 who completed tertiary schooling, 58.6% were Swiss men, 23.3% were Swiss women, 7.5% were non-Swiss men and 10.5% were non-Swiss women.

In the 2009/2010 school year there were a total of 76 students in the Lussy-sur-Morges school district. In the Vaud cantonal school system, two years of non-obligatory pre-school are provided by the political districts. During the school year, the political district provided pre-school care for a total of 631 children of which 203 children (32.2%) received subsidized pre-school care. The canton's primary school program requires students to attend for four years. There were 33 students in the municipal primary school program. The obligatory lower secondary school program lasts for six years and there were 43 students in those schools.

As of 2000, there were 7 students in Lussy-sur-Morges who came from another municipality, while 102 residents attended schools outside the municipality.
