= Willy Michel =

Swiss businessman (born 1947)

- Born: Wilhelm Michel; 29 April 1947 (age 78); Burgdorf, Switzerland
- Occupations: Businessman, art collector
- Known for: Founding and leading Ypsomed
- Children: 3, including Simon

Wilhelm "Willy" Michel (born 29 April 1947) is a Swiss business magnate, billionaire and art collector. He is the founder of Ypsomed Selfcare Solutions, a pharmaceutical company that develops self-injection and diagnostic systems. Michel remains the controlling shareholder with a combined 71% of shares. He is the father of Simon Michel, who serves on the National Council (Switzerland). As of 2023, his net worth is estimated at $3.8 billion by Forbes.
