= Denens =

- Municipality
- Flag Coat of arms
- Location of Denens
- Location within Switzerland Location within Canton of Vaud
- Coordinates: 46°31′N 06°27′E
- Country: Switzerland
- Canton: Vaud
- District: Morges

Government
  - Mayor: Syndic; Bernard Perey

Area
  - Total: 3.27 km^{2} (1.26 sq mi)
- Elevation: 504 m (1,654 ft)

Population (2003)
  - Total: 599
  - Density: 183/km^{2} (474/sq mi)
- Time zone: UTC+01:00 (CET)
  - Summer (DST): UTC+02:00 (CEST)
- Postal code: 1135
- SFOS number: 5631
- ISO 3166 code: CH-VD
- Surrounded by: Bussy-Chardonney, Lully, Lussy-sur-Morges, Villars-sous-Yens, Vufflens-le-Château, Yens
- Website: www.denens.ch

Denens is a municipality in the Swiss canton of Vaud, located in the district of Morges.

== History ==
Denens is first mentioned in 1005 as Disnens.

== Geography ==
Denens has an area, as of 2009, of 3.3 square kilometers (1.3 mi^{2}). Of this area, 2.8 km^{2} (1.1 mi^{2}) or 85.1% is used for agricultural purposes, while 0.1 km^{2} (0.039 mi^{2}) or 3.0% is forested. Of the rest of the land, 0.38 km^{2} (0.15 mi^{2}) or 11.6% is settled (buildings or roads) and 0.01 km^{2} (2.5 acres) or 0.3% is unproductive land.

Of the built up area, housing and buildings made up 7.6% and transportation infrastructure made up 3.0%. Out of the forested land, 1.5% of the total land area is heavily forested and 1.5% is covered with orchards or small clusters of trees. Of the agricultural land, 66.9% is used for growing crops and 2.4% is pastures, while 15.8% is used for orchards or vine crops.

The municipality was part of the Morges District until it was dissolved on 31 August 2006, and Denens became part of the new district of Morges.

The municipality is located on a plateau above the Morges river.

== Coat of arms ==
The blazon of the municipal coat of arms is Argent, on a Coupeaux Vert a Crow statant Sable beaked Or.

== Demographics ==
Denens has a population (as of December 2020) of 742. As of 2008, 14.1% of the population are resident foreign nationals. Over the last 10 years (1999–2009 ) the population has changed at a rate of 13.4%. It has changed at a rate of 6.1% due to migration and at a rate of 7.5% due to births and deaths.

Most of the population (as of 2000) speaks French (515 or 88.6%), with German being second most common (31 or 5.3%) and English being third (9 or 1.5%). There are 3 people who speak Italian.

Of the population in the municipality 135 or about 23.2% were born in Denens and lived there in 2000. There were 222 or 38.2% who were born in the same canton, while 118 or 20.3% were born somewhere else in Switzerland, and 100 or 17.2% were born outside of Switzerland.

In 2008 there were 3 live births to Swiss citizens and 1 birth to non-Swiss citizens, and in same time span there was 1 death of a Swiss citizen. Ignoring immigration and emigration, the population of Swiss citizens increased by 2 while the foreign population increased by 1. There were 4 Swiss women who immigrated back to Switzerland. At the same time, there were 7 non-Swiss men and 3 non-Swiss women who immigrated from another country to Switzerland. The total Swiss population change in 2008 (from all sources, including moves across municipal borders) was a decrease of 18 and the non-Swiss population increased by 6 people. This represents a population growth rate of -1.7%.

The age distribution, as of 2009, in Denens is; 74 children or 11.1% of the population are between 0 and 9 years old and 98 teenagers or 14.7% are between 10 and 19. Of the adult population, 66 people or 9.9% of the population are between 20 and 29 years old. 89 people or 13.3% are between 30 and 39, 112 people or 16.8% are between 40 and 49, and 86 people or 12.9% are between 50 and 59. The senior population distribution is 67 people or 10.0% of the population are between 60 and 69 years old, 50 people or 7.5% are between 70 and 79, there are 24 people or 3.6% who are between 80 and 89, and there is 1 person who is 90 and older.

As of 2000, there were 245 people who were single and never married in the municipality. There were 288 married individuals, 20 widows or widowers and 28 individuals who are divorced.

As of 2000 the average number of residents per living room was 0.55 which is fewer people per room than the cantonal average of 0.61 per room. In this case, a room is defined as space of a housing unit of at least 4 m² (43 sq ft) as normal bedrooms, dining rooms, living rooms, kitchens and habitable cellars and attics. About 64.6% of the total households were owner occupied, or in other words did not pay rent (though they may have a mortgage or a rent-to-own agreement).

As of 2000, there were 215 private households in the municipality, and an average of 2.6 persons per household. There were 43 households that consist of only one person and 25 households with five or more people. Out of a total of 224 households that answered this question, 19.2% were households made up of just one person. Of the rest of the households, there are 68 married couples without children, 77 married couples with children There were 18 single parents with a child or children. There were 9 households that were made up of unrelated people and 9 households that were made up of some sort of institution or another collective housing.

In 2000 there were 104 single family homes (or 68.9% of the total) out of a total of 151 inhabited buildings. There were 21 multi-family buildings (13.9%), along with 23 multi-purpose buildings that were mostly used for housing (15.2%) and 3 other use buildings (commercial or industrial) that also had some housing (2.0%). Of the single family homes 11 were built before 1919, while 25 were built between 1990 and 2000. The greatest number of single family homes (33) were built between 1981 and 1990. The most multi-family homes (7) were built before 1919 and the next most (4) were built between 1961 and 1970. There were 2 multi-family houses built between 1996 and 2000.

In 2000 there were 245 apartments in the municipality. The most common apartment size was 4 rooms of which there were 58. There were 3 single room apartments and 112 apartments with five or more rooms. Of these apartments, a total of 209 apartments (85.3% of the total) were permanently occupied, while 34 apartments (13.9%) were seasonally occupied and 2 apartments (0.8%) were empty. As of 2009, the construction rate of new housing units was 0 new units per 1000 residents. The vacancy rate for the municipality, in 2010, was 0.36%.

The historical population is given in the following chart:

== Sights ==
A feature of Denens is its scarecrow competition, in which the residents of Denens fashion scarecrows of all kinds. They are then displayed around the municipality, giving this village a distinct appearance and allowing visitors to vote for the best scarecrow.

== Politics ==
In the 2007 federal election the most popular party was the SVP which received 23.4% of the vote. The next three most popular parties were the SP (15.07%), the FDP (14.58%) and the LPS Party (13.09%). In the federal election, a total of 223 votes were cast, and the voter turnout was 52.0%.

== Economy ==
As of 2010, Denens had an unemployment rate of 3.1%. As of 2008, there were 56 people employed in the primary economic sector and about 12 businesses involved in this sector. 12 people were employed in the secondary sector and there were 6 businesses in this sector. 32 people were employed in the tertiary sector, with 12 businesses in this sector. There were 292 residents of the municipality who were employed in some capacity, of which females made up 44.2% of the workforce.

In 2008 the total number of full-time equivalent jobs was 62. The number of jobs in the primary sector was 29, all of which were in agriculture. The number of jobs in the secondary sector was 11 of which 3 or (27.3%) were in manufacturing and 8 (72.7%) were in construction. The number of jobs in the tertiary sector was 22. In the tertiary sector; 4 or 18.2% were in wholesale or retail sales or the repair of motor vehicles, 1 was in the movement and storage of goods, 4 or 18.2% were in a hotel or restaurant, 1 was in the information industry, 5 or 22.7% were technical professionals or scientists, 5 or 22.7% were in education.

In 2000, there were 19 workers who commuted into the municipality and 226 workers who commuted away. The municipality is a net exporter of workers, with about 11.9 workers leaving the municipality for every one entering. Of the working population, 9.9% used public transportation to get to work, and 69.5% used a private car.

== Religion ==
From the 2000 census, 148 or 25.5% were Roman Catholic, while 291 or 50.1% belonged to the Swiss Reformed Church. Of the rest of the population, there were 29 individuals (or about 4.99% of the population) who belonged to another Christian church. There were 10 (or about 1.72% of the population) who were Islamic. There were 1 individual who belonged to another church. 93 (or about 16.01% of the population) belonged to no church, are agnostic or atheist, and 21 individuals (or about 3.61% of the population) did not answer the question.

== Education ==
In Denens about 205 or (35.3%) of the population have completed non-mandatory upper secondary education, and 136 or (23.4%) have completed additional higher education (either university or a Fachhochschule). Of the 136 who completed tertiary schooling, 57.4% were Swiss men, 27.9% were Swiss women, 9.6% were non-Swiss men and 5.1% were non-Swiss women.

In the 2009/2010 school year there were a total of 101 students in the Denens school district. In the Vaud cantonal school system, two years of non-obligatory pre-school are provided by the political districts. During the school year, the political district provided pre-school care for a total of 631 children of which 203 children (32.2%) received subsidized pre-school care. The canton's primary school program requires students to attend for four years. There were 48 students in the municipal primary school program. The obligatory lower secondary school program lasts for six years and there were 52 students in those schools. There were also 1 students who were home schooled or attended another non-traditional school.

As of 2000, there were 21 students in Denens who came from another municipality, while 90 residents attended schools outside the municipality.
