= Simon Michel =

Swiss businessman and politician

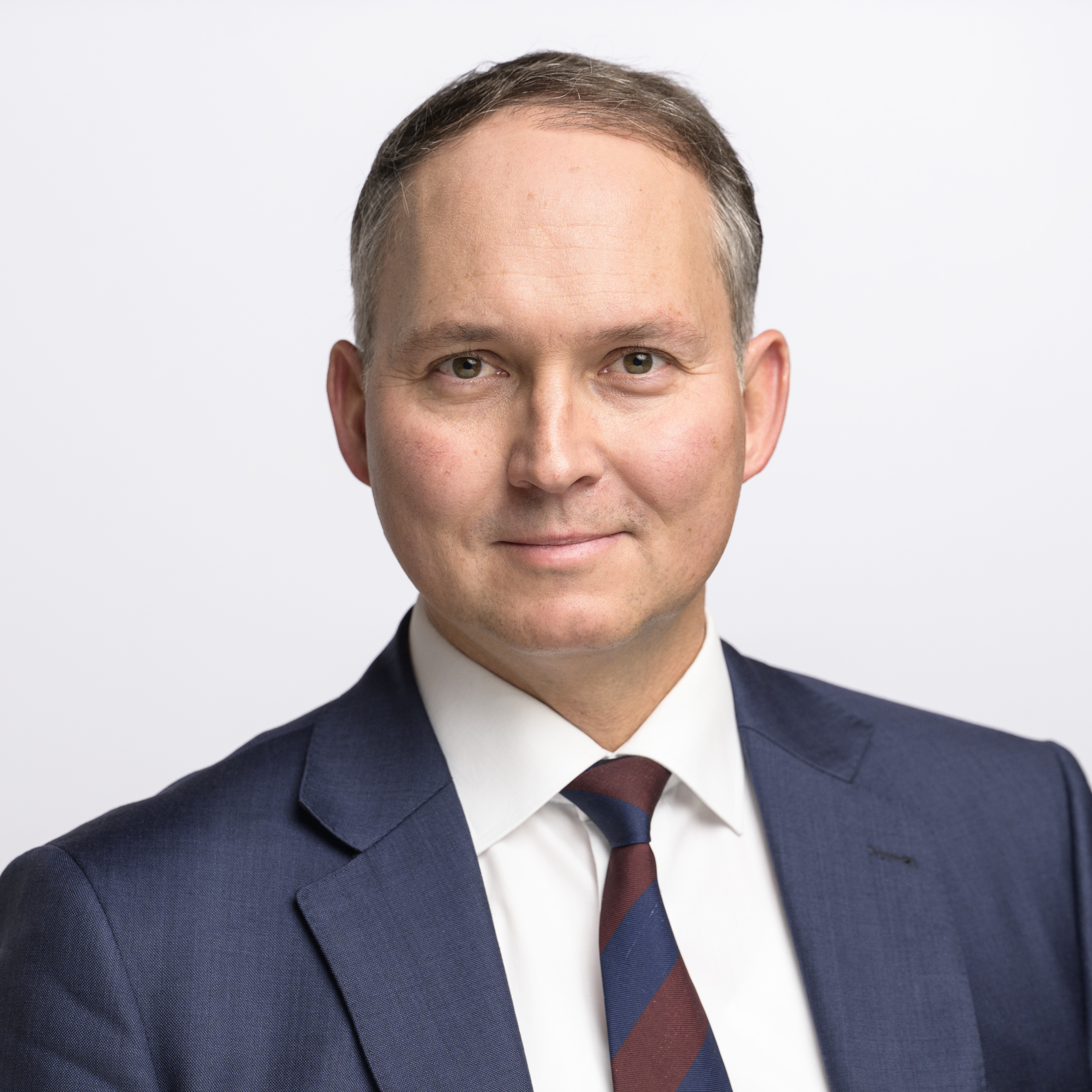
- Official portrait, 2023

Member of the National Council (Switzerland)
- Incumbent
- Assumed office 4 December 2023
- Constituency: Canton of Solothurn

Member of the Cantonal Council of Solothurn
- In office 1 May 2017 – 31 February 2024

Personal details
- Born: Simon Michel; 19 January 1977 (age 49) Burgdorf, Switzerland
- Party: The Liberals
- Spouse: Monika Vollmer (m. 2008)
- Children: 2
- Parent: Willy Michel
- Education: University of St. Gallen (MS); Lancaster University
- Occupation: Businessman, politician
- Website: Official website Parliament website

Military service
- Allegiance: Switzerland
- Branch/service: Swiss Armed Forces
- Years of service: 1995-present
- Rank: Major

Simon Michel (German pronunciation: [ˈziːmɔn ˈmɪçəl]; born 19 January 1977) is a Swiss businessman and politician who currently serves on the National Council (Switzerland) for The Liberals since 2023. Previously he served on the Cantonal Council of Solothurn between 2017 and 2024. Since 2014, he serves as the CEO of Ypsomed Holding, a medical device company that was founded by his father Willy Michel.

== Early life and education ==
Michel was born 19 January 1977 to Willy Michel and his first wife. His father founded Ypsomed Holding, a medical device company, in 1984.

Michel earned a Master of Science in media and communications management from the University of St. Gallen.

== Professional career ==
In 2000, Michel started his career by working as project manager at Disetronic Medical Systems, Inc., the U.S. subsidiary of his father Willy Michel's diagnostics company, in Minneapolis, Minnesota followed by a position as business analyst at Arthur D. Little.

Between 2003 and 2006, he worked for Orange Communications SA, a major Swiss telecommunications company. Since 2006 he engaged in a variety of management positions at Ypsomed AG, since 2014 as its CEO.

He currently serves on several boards of non-listed companies; MV Capital AG, Ahueni AG, sitem-insel AG, Forster Rohner AG (textile manufacturing), LEM Surgical AG, DCB Research AG, Ypsomed Holding AG (medical diagnostics), Ypsotec AG.

== Political career ==
In March 2017, he was elected as lateral entrant, into Cantonal Council of Solothurn for The Liberals. He stepped back from this office by the end of February 2024. Since 4 December 2023, Michel serves on the National Council (Switzerland).

In 2024, Michel became Chairman of Progresuisse, a Swiss advocacy and lobbying group working towards closer ties between Switzerland and the E.U. that he had co-founded in 2021.

== Personal life ==
In 2008, Michel married Monika Vollmer, with whom he has two children. He resides in Solothurn, Switzerland. His net worth is estimated to be 5.5 billion Swiss francs.
