= Tecan =

Swiss laboratory instruments manufacturer

Tecan Group Ltd.
- Type: Public (SIX: TECN)
- Founded: 1980
- Headquarters: Männedorf, canton of Zürich, Switzerland
- Number of locations: 25 (2023)
- Area served: Worldwide
- Key people: Monica Manotas (CEO); Tania Micki (CFO)
- Products: Laboratory and Life Science Equipment
- Number of employees: 3,500 (2023)
- Divisions: Life Sciences; Partnering
- Subsidiaries: IBL International
- Website: https://www.tecan.com/
- Footnotes Tecan's Headquarters in Switzerland

Tecan Group Ltd. is a Swiss company providing laboratory instruments and solutions in biopharmaceuticals, forensics, clinical diagnostics and medical technology for pharmaceutical and biotechnology companies, university research departments, diagnostic laboratories and clinics.

The company specializes in laboratory automation. As an original equipment manufacturer (OEM), it develops and manufactures OEM instruments, components and medical devices that are then distributed by partner companies.

Founded in Switzerland, in 1980, the company has over 3,500 employees, owns production and research and development sites in North America, Europe and APAC and maintains a sales and service network in 52 countries.

In 2021, Tecan generated sales of CHF 946 million. Registered shares of Tecan Group are traded on the SIX Swiss Exchange (TECN; ISIN CH0012100191).

== History ==
Engineers Heinz Abplanalp, Heini Maurer, Heinz Möckli and Gallus Blater founded Tecan (Technische Analysegeräte) on March 18, 1980, with the aim of developing measuring, analysis and laboratory automation devices. The first company office was in the home of the CEO, Heinz Abplanalp, in Hombrechtikon, Switzerland. Tecan soon also started to produce instruments for laboratory automation and environmental analysis. The first instruments were made in renovated barns, apartments and warehouses spread across the whole village of Hombrechtikon. In 1982, the company opened Tecan US in Chapel Hill, North Carolina, for sales and marketing in North America, and Tecan Production Corp. to manufacture for the US marketplace. Two years later, 48% of the share capital was taken over by the finance company Zelux. In 1985, Tecan entered the market with the Tecan Sampler 500 series, the first process-controlled and fully automated pipetting devices. Other products included pH-electrodes, the Tecan Plant SAP Extractor 400 and the Tecan RSP 5052.

In 1986, Tecan was nominated as the Swiss Company of the Year by Zurich industrialists Branco Weiss and by publishers Jean Frey and Ringier, and awarded the Branco-Weiss Prize for innovative companies (TV broadcast). In the same year, Tecan Holding AG was founded, and Tecan Asia opened in Singapore. With 80 employees, Tecan achieved a turnohares in the company. Tecan also acquired ten companies, including OEM liquid handling component manufacturer Cavro Scientific Instruments in the USA (today Tecan Systems, Inc.).

In 1988, Tecan acquired SLT Laborinstrumente GmbH in Grödig near Salzburg, Austria (today Tecan Austria). At the end of the year, Tecan Holding included 29 companies. By the middle of 1989, Tecan was in financial difficulties, and trading in shares was temporarily suspended.

In 1990, under CEO Hans Widmer, Tecan sold a large proportion of its daughter companies. Concentrating on its laboratory automation business, the company only retained its liquid handling robotics production sites in Switzerland, the USA and Austria, together with sales centers in Germany, the UK and the USA. The company returned to profit following this consolidation.

Later in 1990, founder Heinz Abplanalp left the company, and Peter Bollmann become CEO. A year later, the other founding members also left the company.

In 1993, Gottlieb Knoch took over the majority of Tecan shares as an industrial investor. He became President of the board and CEO of the Tecan Group.

In 1994, all production sites were certified to ISO 9001.

In 1995, the Genesis series of laboratory automation workstations was launched, based on new technology (electronics, communication protocols, new storage systems, etc.).

In 1997, the life-sciences company Perkin-Elmer acquired the package of shares from Gottlieb Knoch and thus the majority of voting shares.

In 1998, a collaboration followed with Abbott Laboratories in marketing Genesis FE 500 Workcell.

In 1999, Emile Sutcliffe became CEO, and Perkin-Elmer sold its Tecan shares on the open market. Tecan was restructured and went public for the second time, listed in the main sector of the SWX Swiss Exchange.

In 2001, Tecan moved to new headquarters in Männedorf. Within two years, more than 5,000 Genesis platforms were sold.

In 2003, the launch of the new Freedom EVO platform took place and Aitor Galdos became CEO, leaving the company at the end of 2004.

In 2005, Tecan celebrated its 25th anniversary. Thomas Bachmann became CEO. Tecan took over REMP, a company based in Oberdiessbach, Switzerland, supplying automated laboratory and logistics systems in the life sciences sector.

In 2006, Tecan Austria received two awards from the Federal State Salzburg, Chamber of Commerce. The first award cited Tecan Austria for being the most innovative company in industry with its ‘Infinite’ series of multimode readers. The second award was the federal state winner of the innovation prize for the state of Austria.

In 2007, more than 1,000 Freedom EVO platforms sold.

In 2010, Tecan celebrated its 30th anniversary.

In 2014, the company acquired IBL International, a leading immunoassay company, for €29.0 million.

In 2015, Tecan acquired Sias, a leading OEM supplier of laboratory automation solutions, for approximately CHF 25 million. ,

In 2016, the company acquired SPEware, a company that offers sample preparation solutions to the laboratory by combining chemistry consumables with automation, for $50 million cash and potential earn-out payments up to $10 million.

In 2017, the company acquired Pulssar Technologies, a company that develops, manufactures and markets high performance piston pumps for IVD and Scientific analysis instruments.

In 2018, the company acquired NuGEN Technologies, a company offering NGS kits and consumables

In 2021, the company acquired Paramit, a leading OEM developer and manufacturer of medical devices and life sciences instruments.
