= Genedata =

Swiss bioinformatics company

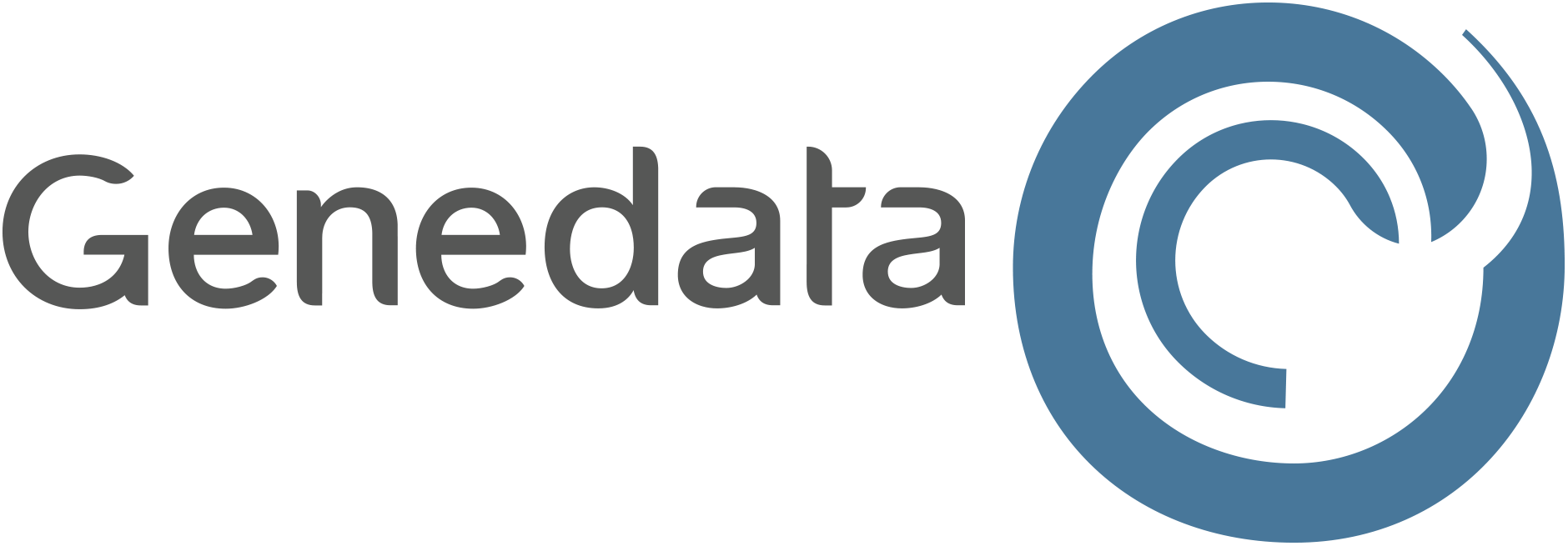
- Industry: Bioinformatics; Biopharmaceutical; Life sciences
- Founded: 1997; 29 years ago
- Headquarters: Basel, Switzerland
- Area served: Worldwide
- Key people: Othmar Pfannes (Founder & CEO)
- Products: https://www.genedata.com/products-services
- Number of employees: ~500
- Website: https://www.genedata.com/

Genedata is a bioinformatics company that develops enterprise software solutions to accelerate biopharmaceutical research and development. Founded in 1997 by Othmar Pfannes, Genedata has grown to approximately 500 employees. Headquartered in Basel, Switzerland with additional offices in Boston, London, Munich, San Francisco, Singapore, and Tokyo, Genedata is in the heart of biopharma clusters around the globe.

Today, the world's top 25 biopharmaceutical enterprises, innovative biotechnology companies, and scientific research institutions use the Genedata Biopharma Platform to improve the efficiency of their R&D operations. With its knowledgeable scientific experts, modular software portfolio, and collaborative approach, Genedata helps companies to more efficiently discover, develop, characterize, and manufacture innovative biotherapeutics of all modalities, including antibodies, cell and gene therapies (CGTs), RNA, and vaccines.

Genedata's solutions drive digitalization, automation, data FAIRness, and AI while complying with regulatory standards.

In July 2024, Genedata joined the Danaher Group.

== Genedata Products ==
Genedata developed its first product for drug target discovery in 1998.The Genedata Biopharma Platform encompasses purpose-built workflow and analysis systems that support discovery, development, and translational research, as well as technology-focused analytical workflows. These systems can be used either individually or together to connect distinct data stream development organizations.

Screener – For assay data analytics and management in discovery and development

Expressionist – For MS-based characterization and QC of biotherapeutics

Selector – For NGS-based target discovery, bioprocess development, and QC of biotherapeutics

Biologics – For covering the end-to-end biotherapeutics discovery workflow for all modalities

Profiler – For translational research and precision medicine development

Bioprocess – For bioprocess development workflows

Chromatics – For streamlining chromatography data management and analysis

Vico - For unified CMC data and AI-driven analytics across development and manufacturing
