= Tolochenaz =

- Municipality
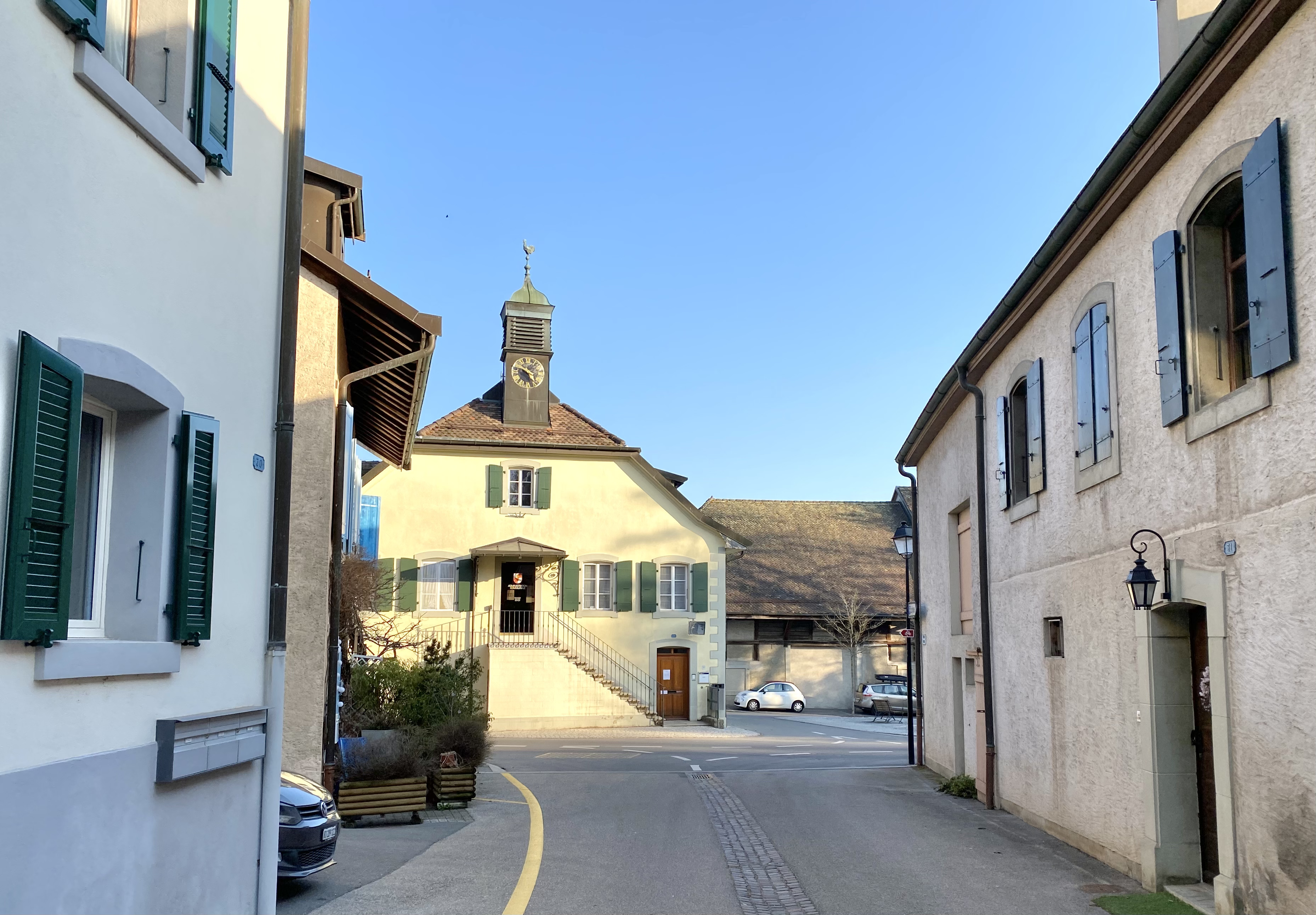

- Flag Coat of arms
- Location of Tolochenaz
- Location within Switzerland Location within Canton of Vaud
- Coordinates: 46°30′N 06°28′E
- Country: Switzerland
- Canton: Vaud
- District: Morges

Government
  - Mayor: Syndic; François Girard

Area
  - Total: 1.58 km^{2} (0.61 sq mi)
- Elevation: 423 m (1,388 ft)

Population (2003)
  - Total: 1,661
  - Density: 1,050/km^{2} (2,720/sq mi)
- Time zone: UTC+01:00 (CET)
  - Summer (DST): UTC+02:00 (CEST)
- Postal code: 1131
- SFOS number: 5649
- ISO 3166 code: CH-VD
- Surrounded by: Chigny, Lully, Morges, Saint-Prex
- Website: tolochenaz.ch

Tolochenaz (French pronunciation: [tɔlɔʃ(ə)na]) is a municipality in the Swiss canton of Vaud, located in the district of Morges.

== Geography ==
Tolochenaz lies on the northern shore of Lake Geneva west of Lausanne.

Tolochenaz has an area, as of 2009, of 1.6 square kilometers (0.62 mi^{2}). Of this area, 0.55 km^{2} (0.21 mi^{2}) or 34.6% is used for agricultural purposes, while 0.11 km^{2} (0.042 mi^{2}) or 6.9% is forested. Of the rest of the land, 0.91 km^{2} (0.35 mi^{2}) or 57.2% is settled (buildings or roads) and 0.02 km^{2} (4.9 acres) or 1.3% is unproductive land.

In the built up area, industrial buildings made up 11.3% of the total area while housing and buildings made up 25.8% and transportation infrastructure made up 15.7%. while parks, green belts and sports fields made up 3.8%. Out of the forested land, 3.8% of the total land area is heavily forested and 3.1% is covered with orchards or small clusters of trees. Of the agricultural land, 17.0% is used for growing crops and 3.1% is pastures, while 14.5% is used for orchards or vine crops.

The municipality was part of the Morges District until it was dissolved on 31 August 2006, when Tolochenaz became part of the new district of Morges.

== Coat of arms ==
The blazon of the municipal coat of arms is Quartered Argent and Gules, overall Fasces topped with feathered hat all Or.

== Notable residents ==
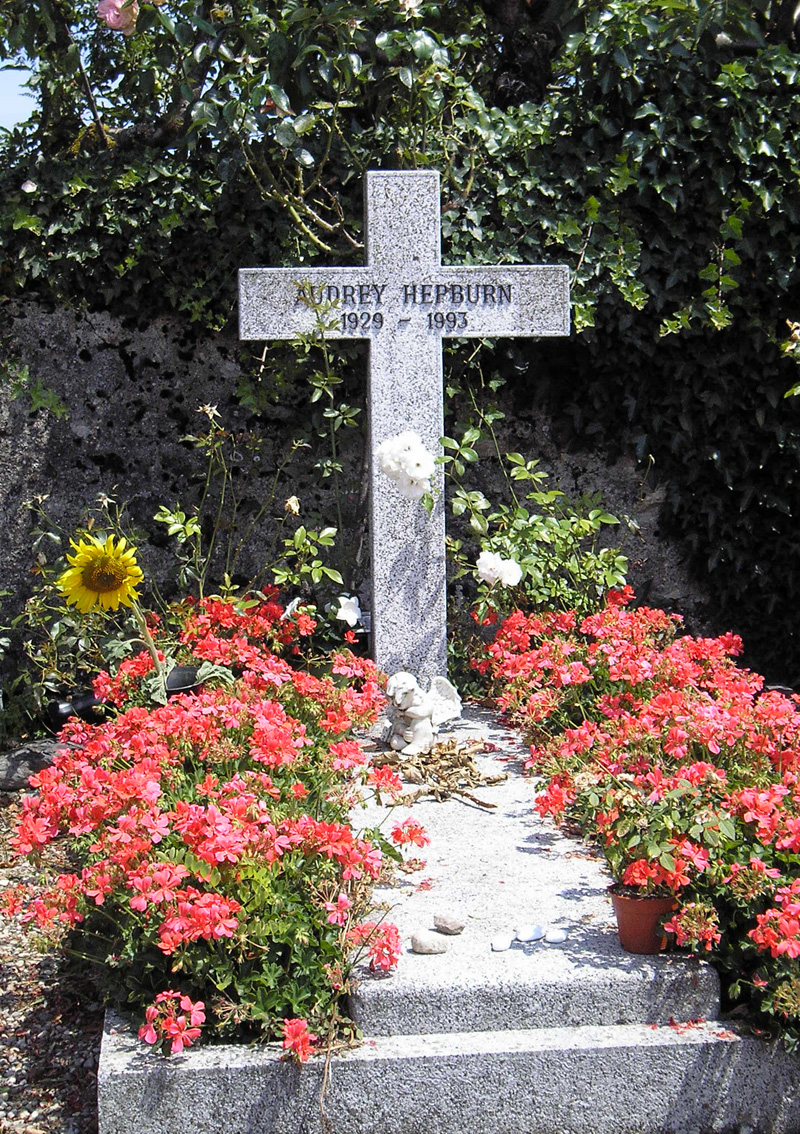
Audrey Hepburn's Grave in Tolochenaz.

A notable resident was actress Audrey Hepburn, who lived there from 1963 until her death in 1993 and is buried there. Other famous residents include the legendary tenor Nicolai Gedda, who lived in retirement there with his wife, and the dancer Zizi Jeanmaire.

== Demographics ==
Tolochenaz has a population (as of December 2020) of 1,892. As of 2008, 26.8% of the population are resident foreign nationals. Over the last 10 years (1999–2009 ) the population has changed at a rate of 2%. It has changed at a rate of -6.9% due to migration and at a rate of 8.7% due to births and deaths.

Most of the population (as of 2000) speaks French (1,386 or 84.2%), with German being second most common (85 or 5.2%) and Portuguese being third (42 or 2.6%). There are 39 people who speak Italian and 1 person who speaks Romansh.

Of the population in the municipality 237 or about 14.4% were born in Tolochenaz and lived there in 2000. There were 639 or 38.8% who were born in the same canton, while 299 or 18.2% were born somewhere else in Switzerland, and 430 or 26.1% were born outside of Switzerland.

In 2008 there were 9 live births to Swiss citizens and 6 births to non-Swiss citizens, and in same time span there were 5 deaths of Swiss citizens and 1 non-Swiss citizen death. Ignoring immigration and emigration, the population of Swiss citizens increased by 4 while the foreign population increased by 5. There were 2 Swiss men who immigrated back to Switzerland and 2 Swiss women who emigrated from Switzerland. At the same time, there were 10 non-Swiss men and 14 non-Swiss women who immigrated from another country to Switzerland. The total Swiss population change in 2008 (from all sources, including moves across municipal borders) was a decrease of 1 and the non-Swiss population increased by 17 people. This represents a population growth rate of 0.9%.

The age distribution, as of 2009, in Tolochenaz is; 212 children or 12.4% of the population are between 0 and 9 years old and 188 teenagers or 11.0% are between 10 and 19. Of the adult population, 201 people or 11.8% of the population are between 20 and 29 years old. 260 people or 15.3% are between 30 and 39, 293 people or 17.2% are between 40 and 49, and 224 people or 13.2% are between 50 and 59. The senior population distribution is 167 people or 9.8% of the population are between 60 and 69 years old, 109 people or 6.4% are between 70 and 79, there are 44 people or 2.6% who are between 80 and 89, and there are 5 people or 0.3% who are 90 and older.

As of 2000, there were 686 people who were single and never married in the municipality. There were 806 married individuals, 45 widows or widowers and 109 individuals who are divorced.

As of 2000, there were 698 private households in the municipality, and an average of 2.3 persons per household. There were 219 households that consist of only one person and 41 households with five or more people. Out of a total of 706 households that answered this question, 31.0% were households made up of just one person. Of the rest of the households, there are 192 married couples without children, 230 married couples with children There were 53 single parents with a child or children. There were 4 households that were made up of unrelated people and 8 households that were made up of some sort of institution or another collective housing.

In 2000 there were 160 single family homes (or 62.5% of the total) out of a total of 256 inhabited buildings. There were 65 multi-family buildings (25.4%), along with 16 multi-purpose buildings that were mostly used for housing (6.3%) and 15 other use buildings (commercial or industrial) that also had some housing (5.9%). Of the single family homes 12 were built before 1919, while 17 were built between 1990 and 2000. The greatest number of single family homes (51) were built between 1981 and 1990. The most multi-family homes (19) were built between 1971 and 1980 and the next most (14) were built between 1981 and 1990. There were 4 multi-family houses built between 1996 and 2000.

In 2000 there were 787 apartments in the municipality. The most common apartment size was 3 rooms of which there were 251. There were 53 single room apartments and 150 apartments with five or more rooms. Of these apartments, a total of 676 apartments (85.9% of the total) were permanently occupied, while 50 apartments (6.4%) were seasonally occupied and 61 apartments (7.8%) were empty. As of 2009, the construction rate of new housing units was 0 new units per 1000 residents. The vacancy rate for the municipality, in 2010, was 0.12%.

The historical population is given in the following chart:

== Politics ==
In the 2007 federal election the most popular party was the SP which received 21.29% of the vote. The next three most popular parties were the SVP (20.93%), the Green Party (17.54%) and the FDP (12.43%). In the federal election, a total of 458 votes were cast, and the voter turnout was 47.0%.

== Economy ==
Medtronic has its Europe/Asia headquarters in Tolochenaz.

As of 2010, Tolochenaz had an unemployment rate of 5.2%. As of 2008, there were 4 people employed in the primary economic sector and about 1 business involved in this sector. 604 people were employed in the secondary sector and there were 22 businesses in this sector. 1,110 people were employed in the tertiary sector, with 59 businesses in this sector. There were 883 residents of the municipality who were employed in some capacity, of which females made up 43.8% of the workforce.

In 2008 the total number of full-time equivalent jobs was 1,613. The number of jobs in the primary sector was 3, all of which were in agriculture. The number of jobs in the secondary sector was 581 of which 502 or (86.4%) were in manufacturing and 59 (10.2%) were in construction. The number of jobs in the tertiary sector was 1,029. In the tertiary sector; 179 or 17.4% were in wholesale or retail sales or the repair of motor vehicles, 267 or 25.9% were in the movement and storage of goods, 20 or 1.9% were in a hotel or restaurant, 71 or 6.9% were the insurance or financial industry, 289 or 28.1% were technical professionals or scientists, 40 or 3.9% were in education and 1 was in health care.

In 2000, there were 1,119 workers who commuted into the municipality and 718 workers who commuted away. The municipality is a net importer of workers, with about 1.6 workers entering the municipality for every one leaving. About 2.8% of the workforce coming into Tolochenaz are coming from outside Switzerland. Of the working population, 19.7% used public transportation to get to work, and 63% used a private car.

== Religion ==
From the 2000 census, 626 or 38.0% were Roman Catholic, while 596 or 36.2% belonged to the Swiss Reformed Church. Of the rest of the population, there were 7 members of an Orthodox church (or about 0.43% of the population), there were 2 individuals (or about 0.12% of the population) who belonged to the Christian Catholic Church, and there were 100 individuals (or about 6.08% of the population) who belonged to another Christian church. There was 1 individual who was Jewish, and 27 (or about 1.64% of the population) who were Muslim. There were 7 individuals who were Buddhist and 4 individuals who belonged to another church. 233 (or about 14.16% of the population) belonged to no church, are agnostic or atheist, and 93 individuals (or about 5.65% of the population) did not answer the question.

== Education ==
In Tolochenaz about 627 or (38.1%) of the population have completed non-mandatory upper secondary education, and 285 or (17.3%) have completed additional higher education (either university or a Fachhochschule). Of the 285 who completed tertiary schooling, 53.7% were Swiss men, 26.7% were Swiss women, 12.3% were non-Swiss men and 7.4% were non-Swiss women.

In the 2009/2010 school year there were a total of 212 students in the Tolochenaz school district. In the Vaud cantonal school system, two years of non-obligatory pre-school are provided by the political districts. During the school year, the political district provided pre-school care for a total of 631 children of which 203 children (32.2%) received subsidized pre-school care. The canton's primary school program requires students to attend for four years. There were 123 students in the municipal primary school program. The obligatory lower secondary school program lasts for six years and there were 86 students in those schools. There were also 3 students who were home schooled or attended another non-traditional school.

As of 2000, there were 15 students in Tolochenaz who came from another municipality, while 213 residents attended schools outside the municipality.
