= Henny =

Henny is a Scandinavian and Dutch male and female first name, nickname and surname. It may refer to:

== Women ==
=== Given name ===
- Henny Lindorff Buckhøj (1902–1979), Danish actress
- Henny Koch (1854–1925), German children's author
- Henny Lauritzen (1871–1938), Danish actress
- Henny Moan (1936–2024), Norwegian actress
- Henny Mürer (1925–1997), Norwegian choreographer and dancer
- Henny Reistad (born 1999), Norwegian handball player
- Henny Skjønberg (1886–1973), Norwegian actress and stage director
- Henný Eldey Vilhjálmsdóttir (1935–1995), stage name Elly Vilhjálms, Icelandic singer
- Henny Wolff (1896–1965), German concert singer and voice teacher

=== Nickname ===
- Hendrikje van Andel-Schipper (1890–2005), Dutch supercentenarian and longest-lived Dutch person in history
- Henriette Arendt (1874–1922), also known as "Sister Henny", German writer and early policewoman
- Henny Astrup (1876–1961), Norwegian actress
- Henny Backus (1911–2004), Broadway showgirl, wife of actor Jim Backus
- Henny Dons (1874–1966), Norwegian educator and missionary
- Henriette "Henny" Hiebel (1905–1940), aka La Jana, Austro-German dancer and actress
- Henny Porten (1890–1960), German actress and film producer of the silent era
- Henriette von Schirach (1913–1992), German writer
- Henny Tscherning (1853–1932), pioneering Danish nurse and trade unionist
- Henny Vegter (born 1958), Dutch sailor at the 1988 Olympics

== Men ==
=== Given name ===
- Henny Meijer (born 1962), Dutch footballer
- Henny Schilder (born 1984), Dutch footballer
- Henny van Schoonhoven (1970–2009), Dutch footballer
- Henny Vrienten (1948–2022), Dutch composer, singer, songwriter and musician
- Henny ter Weer (1922–2013), Dutch fencer
- Henny Wolter, former guitarist with Primal Fear, a German power metal band

=== Nickname ===
- Henny Eman (1948–2025), Aruban politician and first Prime Minister of Aruba
- Henny Eman (born 1887) (1887–1957), Aruban politician, grandfather of the above
- Henny Scholtz (born 1911), Dutch sailor at the 1964 Summer Olympics
- Henny Youngman (1906–1998), British-born American comedian

== Surname ==
- Leonard M. Henny (1935–2011), Dutch filmmaker, teacher and writer
- Phil Henny (born 1943) Swiss racing mechanic, driver and author
- Victor Henny (1887–1941), Dutch sprinter

== See also ==
- Henie, a list of people with the surname
- Hennie, a list of people with the given name, nickname or surname
- Hennies, a list of people with the surname
- Henney (disambiguation), including a list of people with the surname
