= Henney =

Henney may refer to:

== People ==
- Árpád Henney (1895–1980), Hungarian politician and military officer
- Charles W. Henney (1884–1969), member of the United States House of Representatives from Wisconsin
- Dagmar R. Henney (1931–2023), German-born American mathematician and professor at George Washington University
- Daniel Henney (born 1979), Korean American actor and model
- Del Henney (1935–2019), British character actor
- Jane E. Henney (born 1947), MD, physician, commissioner of the U.S. Food and Drug Administration
- Katie Henney (born 1993), American child actress
- Kevlin Henney, British technology writer

== Businesses ==
- Henney Kilowatt, a French-American electric car
- Henney Motor Company, manufacturer of bodies for motor vehicles
