= Victor Wouk =

American scientist (1919–2005)

- Born: April 27, 1919; New York City, U.S.
- Died: May 19, 2005 (aged 86); New York City, U.S.
- Education: California Institute of Technology; Columbia University
- Known for: Pioneer in the development of electric and hybrid vehicles
- Scientific career
- Fields: Electrical Engineer
- Workplaces: Westinghouse

Victor Wouk (/ˈwoʊk/; April 27, 1919 – May 19, 2005) was an American scientist. He was the pioneer in the development of electric and hybrid vehicles.

== Early life ==
Victor Wouk, the younger brother of the writer Herman Wouk, was born in 1919 in New York City, the son of Esther (née Levine) and Abraham Isaac Wouk. His parents were Russian Jewish immigrants from what is today Belarus. His father toiled for many years to raise the family out of poverty before opening a successful laundry service. He earned a bachelor's degree from Columbia University in 1939 and received his Ph.D. from the California Institute of Technology in 1942. His dissertation was Static electricity generated during the distribution of gasoline.

== Career ==
Wouk organized a company, Beta Electric, and in 1956, sold it only to form a new one, the Electronic Energy Conversion Corporation (EECC). In 1960, he designed smaller and higher-efficiency AC-to-DC converters. In 1962, Wouk was noticed by Russell Feldmann, president of the National Union Electric Company and one of the founders of Motorola, who had Renault Dauphines converted to electric power (known as Henney Kilowatt cars), and was in need of an efficient speed controller for them.

In 1963, Wouk sold EECC to Gulton Industries and continued his work with them. Because the domestic Big Three automakers (GM, Ford, and Chrysler) had their own electric car programs, the much smaller American Motors Corporation (AMC) partnered with Gulton to develop a new battery based car using lithium and the advanced speed controller designed by Wouk. The running prototype was a 1969 Rambler American station wagon converted from AMC's gasoline 290 cu in (4.8 L) V8 engine, to an all-electric car. Power consisted of 160 Gulton nickel–cadmium batteries, each rated at 75 ampere hours, and controlled through Wouk designed electronics. It had good acceleration, but relying on batteries alone limited the car's range.

The experiments with the Rambler American convinced Wouk that battery problems were not going to be solved easily to satisfy consumers. He started to design a system that would combine an internal combustion engine with an electric motor for motive power. Wouk began working on ideas for a hybrid for American Motors.

The United States Environmental Protection Agency (EPA) established a "Clean Car Incentive Program" that funded innovative designs from the auto industry and inventors. Wouk's idea to create a hybrid car was approved in 1971, and the EPA was "to consider a nationwide test of vehicles based on his design if satisfied with the prototype." Wouk and friends invested about $300,000, and successfully converted a 1972 Buick Skylark sedan. This was the first full-sized hybrid vehicle featuring a 20-kilowatt direct-current electric motor and an RX-2 Mazda rotary engine. This vehicle was tested at EPA's emissions-testing laboratories in Ann Arbor, Michigan, where it obtained more than twice the fuel economy of the vehicle before it was converted. Furthermore, the vehicle's emission rates were only about nine percent of those of a gasoline-powered car from that era. In 1974, the EPA awarded $33,000 to Wouk and Dr. Charles L. Rosen and began its own analysis of the car, but the agency did not make additional cars for the planned nationwide tests.

This pioneering work gained Wouk the nickname of the grandfather of electric and hybrid vehicles in the United States. Even though they were not a new idea, mass-production hybrid vehicles aimed at the general market would in fact only appear by the late 1990s. The second modern hybrid car marketed to consumers was the Toyota Prius (the first was the Honda Insight), which was based on principles similar to Wouk's. The Prius became available in the U.S. as a 2001 model, and Wouk leased one.

Wouk was also actively involved in the field of electric vehicle standardization, participating in relevant technical committees such as the IEC TC69 and the ISO TC22 SC21 on electric vehicles. He remained an active member of these committees until the early 2000s.

Wouk was awarded The Elmer A. Sperry Award for Advancing the Art of Transportation, posthumously, "for his visionary approach to developing the gasoline engine-electric motor hybrid systems for automobiles...."

The archives of Victor Wouk are kept at Caltech.

== Personal life ==
Victor Wouk died of cancer on May 19, 2005, in his Manhattan, New York home. He was survived by his wife Joy (died September 29, 2008), and sons Jonathan and Jordan. His nephew was Alan I. Green, a psychiatrist at Dartmouth College.
