= C. Russell Feldmann =

American Businessman

C. Russell Feldmann (1898 - Greenwich, Connecticut, December 13, 1973) was an American industrialist known for building diversified interests in the electronics, automotive, and defense sectors. Born in Philadelphia to devout Quaker parents, Feldmann parlayed early insights into the potential of emerging technologies such as radios, air conditioning, and plastics, into a business empire.

An early belief in the potential for the diesel engine led Feldmann to acquire the Winton Engine Company, an early innovator in the space, which he later sold to Alfred P. Sloan to form the diesel division of General Motors Corporation. Loosely credited with the idea of bringing the household radio to the automobile, in the 1920s Feldmann subsequently founded Automobile Radio Corporation with Walter Chrysler to bring the Transitone radio, the first mobile radio unit designed exclusively for installation in automobiles, to market. Automobile Radio Corporation would then become a nucleus of Feldmann's diversified conglomerate National Union Electric Corporation which included non-automobile divisions including Eureka Williams Company, Emerson Quiet Kool (EQK), and Napco Plastics and Advanced Science.

== Henney Kilowatt ==
Among his various ventures, Feldmann is known for his early efforts to commercialize electric vehicles. In the late 1950s he partnered his Henney Motor Co, with his own National Union Electric Corporation's Exide Battery Corporation to develop the 1959 Henney Kilowatt, one of commercially marketed electric vehicles.

== Perlman v. Feldmann ==
Feldmann played a central role in the landmark corporate law case Perlman v. Feldmann, arising from the sale of his controlling interest in Newport Steel at a premium to a syndicate of steel end-users that valued a controlling interest in the entity in order to direct the output of steel. The U.S. Court of Appeals ruled that Feldmann had breached his fiduciary duty to minority shareholders by profiting from a corporate opportunity, setting a precedent in corporate governance law.

== Personal life ==
Feldmann's sister Estella was married to Clessie Cummins, founder of Cummins, Inc., who she met through Feldmann's business dealings with Cummins. Feldmann and Cummins were together responsible for the first diesel powered vehicle to compete in the Indianapolis 500. Feldmann resided at Horse Island in Greenwich, CT.
