= Villars-sous-Champvent =

- Former municipality
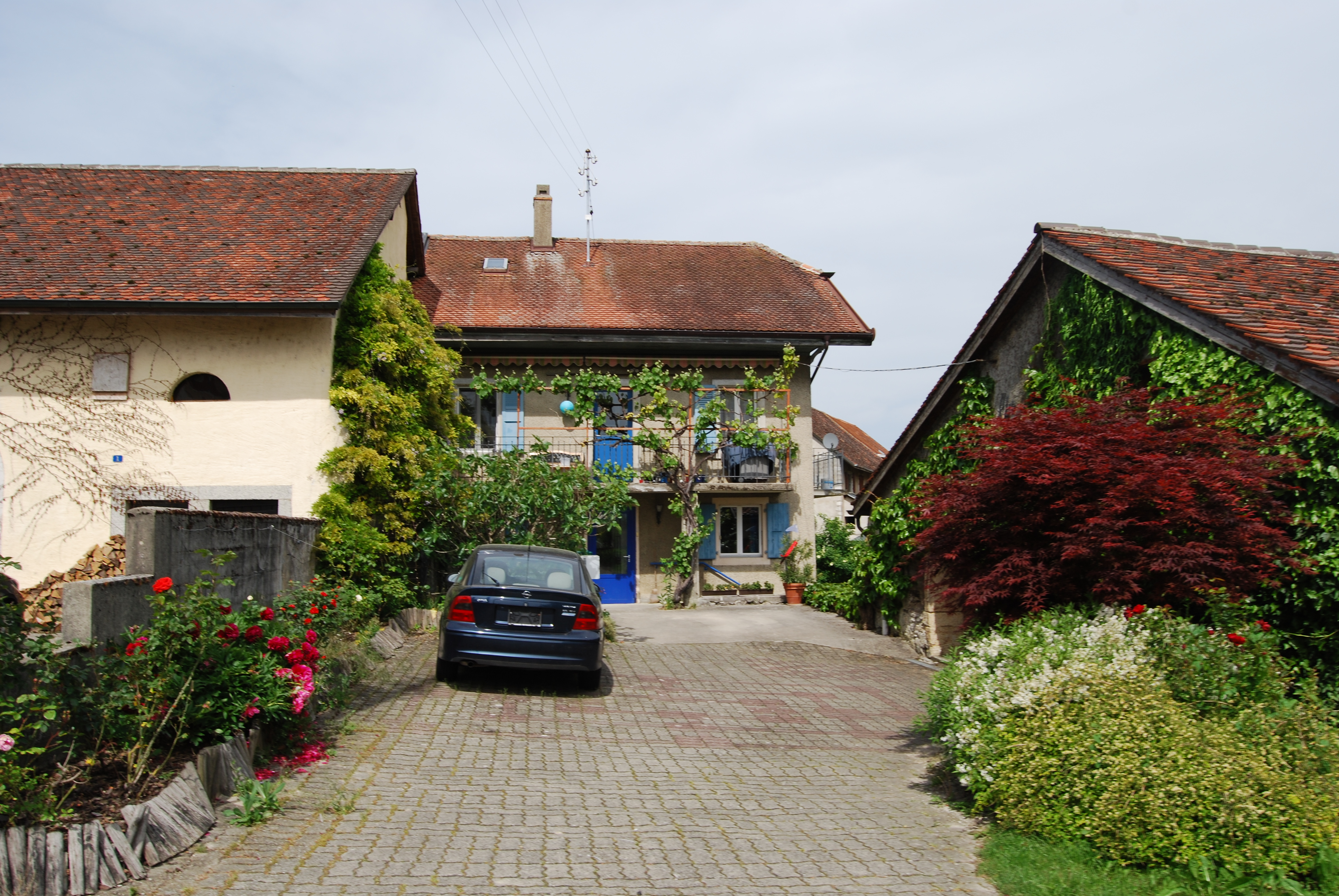

- Flag Coat of arms
- Location of Villars-sous-Champvent
- Location within Switzerland Location within Canton of Vaud
- Coordinates: 46°47′N 6°35′E
- Country: Switzerland
- Canton: Vaud
- District: Jura-Nord Vaudois

Area
  - Total: 0.92 km^{2} (0.36 sq mi)
- Elevation: 464 m (1,522 ft)

Population (2010)
  - Total: 59
  - Density: 64/km^{2} (170/sq mi)
- Time zone: UTC+01:00 (CET)
  - Summer (DST): UTC+02:00 (CEST)
- Postal code: 1443
- SFOS number: 5936
- ISO 3166 code: CH-VD
- Surrounded by: Chamblon, Champvent, Essert-sous-Champvent, Montagny-près-Yverdon, Suscévaz
- Website: Profile (in French), SFSO statistics

Villars-sous-Champvent was a former municipality in the district of Jura-Nord Vaudois of the canton of Vaud in Switzerland. The municipalities of Essert-sous-Champvent and Villars-sous-Champvent merged on 1 January 2012 into the municipality of Champvent.

== Geography ==
Villars-sous-Champvent had an area, as of 2009, of 0.9 square kilometers (0.35 mi^{2}). Of this area, 0.77 km^{2} (0.30 mi^{2}) or 84.6% is used for agricultural purposes, while 0.08 km^{2} (0.031 mi^{2}) or 8.8% is forested. Of the rest of the land, 0.06 km^{2} (15 acres) or 6.6% is settled (buildings or roads).

Of the built up area, housing and buildings made up 2.2% and transportation infrastructure made up 3.3%. Power and water infrastructure as well as other special developed areas made up 1.1% of the area Out of the forested land, 7.7% of the total land area is heavily forested and 1.1% is covered with orchards or small clusters of trees. Of the agricultural land, 70.3% is used for growing crops and 9.9% is pastures, while 4.4% is used for orchards or vine crops.

The former municipality was part of the Yverdon District until it was dissolved on 31 August 2006, and Villars-sous-Champvent became part of the new district of Jura-Nord Vaudois.

Villars-sous-Champvent lies at an elevation of 464 m (1,522 ft), 4.5 km (2.8 mi) west as the crow flies from Yverdon-les-Bains. This farm village is nestled in the Bey valley.

To the north are the hills that rise to the foot of the Jura Mountains. To the south lies the Mont de Chamblon (510 m (1,670 ft)), the highest point in the municipality.

The surrounding municipalities are Montagny-près-Yverdon, Chamblon, Suscévaz, Champvent, and Essert-sous-Champvent.

== Coat of arms ==
The blazon of the municipal coat of arms is Pally of Six Argent and Azure, overall a Harrow Gules.

== Demographics ==
Villars-sous-Champvent had a population (as of 2010) of 59. As of 2008, about 1.9% of the population are resident foreign nationals. Over the last 10 years (1999–2009 ) the population has changed at a rate of 12.8%. It has changed at a rate of 4.3% due to migration and at a rate of 8.5% due to births and deaths.

Most of the population (as of 2000) speaks French (44 or 97.8%) as their first language with the rest speaking German

The age distribution, as of 2009, in Villars-sous-Champvent is; 6 children or 11.3% of the population are between 0 and 9 years old and 10 teenagers or 18.9% are between 10 and 19. Of the adult population, 7 people or 13.2% of the population are between 20 and 29 years old. 10 people or 18.9% are between 30 and 39, 8 people or 15.1% are between 40 and 49, and 5 people or 9.4% are between 50 and 59. The senior population distribution is 4 people or 7.5% of the population are between 60 and 69 years old, 3 people or 5.7% are between 70 and 79, there are people or 0.0% who are between 80 and 89.

As of 2000, there were 16 people who were single and never married in the municipality. There were 26 married individuals, 2 widows or widowers and 1 individuals who are divorced.

As of 2000 the average number of residents per living room was 0.52 which is fewer people per room than the cantonal average of 0.61 per room. In this case, a room is defined as space of a housing unit of at least 4 m² (43 sq ft) as normal bedrooms, dining rooms, living rooms, kitchens and habitable cellars and attics. About 61.1% of the total households were owner occupied, or in other words did not pay rent (though they may have a mortgage or a rent-to-own agreement).

As of 2000, there were 19 private households in the municipality, and an average of 2.4 persons per household. There were 4 households that consist of only one person. Out of a total of 19 households that answered this question, 21.1% were households made up of just one person. Of the rest of the households, there are 8 married couples without children, 7 married couples with children.

In 2000 there were 4 single family homes (or 30.8% of the total) out of a total of 13 inhabited buildings. There were 1 multi-family buildings (7.7%), along with 7 multi-purpose buildings that were mostly used for housing (53.8%) and 1 other use buildings (commercial or industrial) that also had some housing (7.7%).

In 2000, a total of 18 apartments (94.7% of the total) were permanently occupied, while 1 apartment was seasonally occupied. As of 2009, the construction rate of new housing units was 18.9 new units per 1000 residents. The vacancy rate for the municipality, in 2010, was 4.76%.

The historical population is given in the following chart:

== Politics ==
In the 2007 federal election the most popular party was the SVP which received 43.08% of the vote. The next three most popular parties were the FDP (20.18%), the Green Party (11.79%) and the SP (10.88%). In the federal election, a total of 25 votes were cast, and the voter turnout was 64.1%.

== Economy ==
As of 2010, Villars-sous-Champvent had an unemployment rate of 0%. As of 2008, there were 16 people employed in the primary economic sector and about 3 businesses involved in this sector. 1 person was employed in the secondary sector and there was 1 business in this sector. 2 people were employed in the tertiary sector, with 1 business in this sector. There were 23 residents of the municipality who were employed in some capacity, of which females made up 43.5% of the workforce.

In 2008 the total number of full-time equivalent jobs was 11. The number of jobs in the primary sector was 8, all of which were in agriculture. The number of jobs in the secondary sector was 1, in construction. The number of jobs in the tertiary sector was 2, both in the sale or repair of motor vehicles.

In 2000, there were 17 workers who commuted away from the municipality. Of the working population, 4.3% used public transportation to get to work, and 65.2% used a private car.

== Religion ==
From the 2000 census, 10 or 22.2% were Roman Catholic, while 35 or 77.8% belonged to the Swiss Reformed Church.

== Education ==
In Villars-sous-Champvent about 18 or (40.0%) of the population have completed non-mandatory upper secondary education, and 5 or (11.1%) have completed additional higher education (either university or a Fachhochschule). Of the 5 who completed tertiary schooling, 80.0% were Swiss men, 20.0% were Swiss women.

In the 2009/2010 school year there were a total of 9 students in the Villars-sous-Champvent school district. In the Vaud cantonal school system, two years of non-obligatory pre-school are provided by the political districts. During the school year, the political district provided pre-school care for a total of 578 children of which 359 children (62.1%) received subsidized pre-school care. The canton's primary school program requires students to attend for four years. There were 5 students in the municipal primary school program. The obligatory lower secondary school program lasts for six years and there were 4 students in those schools.

As of 2000, there were 7 students from Villars-sous-Champvent who attended schools outside the municipality.
