= Essert-sous-Champvent =

- Former municipality
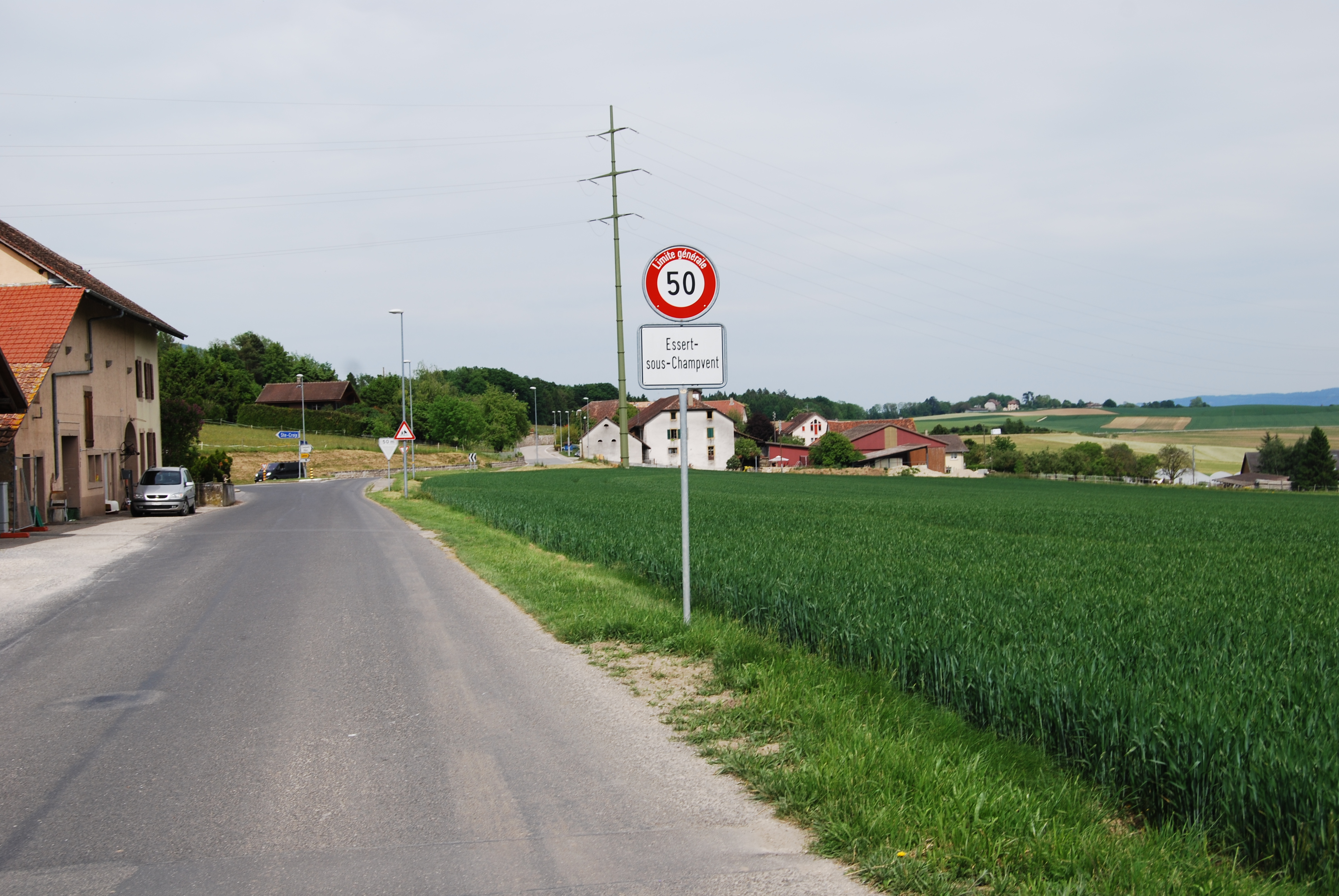

- Flag Coat of arms
- Location of Essert-sous-Champvent
- Location within Switzerland Location within Canton of Vaud
- Coordinates: 46°48′N 6°35′E
- Country: Switzerland
- Canton: Vaud
- District: Jura-Nord Vaudois

Area
  - Total: 1.23 km^{2} (0.47 sq mi)
- Elevation: 480 m (1,570 ft)

Population (2010)
  - Total: 151
  - Density: 123/km^{2} (318/sq mi)
- Time zone: UTC+01:00 (CET)
  - Summer (DST): UTC+02:00 (CEST)
- Postal code: 1443
- SFOS number: 5916
- ISO 3166 code: CH-VD
- Surrounded by: Champvent, Montagny-près-Yverdon, Valeyres-sous-Montagny, Villars-sous-Champvent, Vuiteboeuf
- Website: Profile (in French), SFSO statistics

Essert-sous-Champvent is a former municipality in the district of Jura-Nord Vaudois of the canton of Vaud in Switzerland. The municipalities of Essert-sous-Champvent and Villars-sous-Champvent merged on 1 January 2012 into the municipality of Champvent.

== Geography ==
Essert-sous-Champvent is located in a small valley between Chamblon hill and the foothills of the Jura Mountains. The Brinaz river flows through it. as of 2009, the former municipality had an area of 1.2 square kilometers (0.46 mi^{2}). Of this area, 0.85 km^{2} (0.33 mi^{2}) or 70.2% is used for agricultural purposes, while 0.24 km^{2} (0.093 mi^{2}) or 19.8% is forested. Of the rest of the land, 0.14 km^{2} (35 acres) or 11.6% is settled (buildings or roads).

Of the built up area, housing and buildings made up 3.3% and transportation infrastructure made up 7.4%. Out of the forested land, all of the forested land area is covered with heavy forests. Of the agricultural land, 51.2% is used for growing crops and 9.1% is pastures, while 9.9% is used for orchards or vine crops.

== History ==
Essert-sous-Champvent was first mentioned in 1095 as Exertas.

It was part of the Yverdon District until it was dissolved on 31 August 2006, and became part of the new district of Jura-Nord Vaudois.

In February 2024, it became the scene of a hostage taking incident, in which an Iranian asylum-seeker was killed.

== Coat of arms ==
The blazon of the municipal coat of arms is Paly of six Argent and Azure, two Stumps eradicated crossed in saltire Gules.

== Demographics ==
Essert-sous-Champvent has a population (as of 2010) of 151. As of 2008, 24.6% of the population are resident foreign nationals. Over the last 10 years (1999–2009 ) the population has changed at a rate of 36%. It has changed at a rate of 18.9% due to migration and at a rate of 17.1% due to births and deaths.

Most of the population (as of 2000) speaks French (94 or 71.2%) as their first language, with Portuguese being second most common (28 or 21.2%) and Italian being third (6 or 4.5%). There are 2 people who speak German.

The age distribution, as of 2009, in Essert-sous-Champvent is; 19 children or 12.6% of the population are between 0 and 9 years old and 19 teenagers or 12.6% are between 10 and 19. Of the adult population, 20 people or 13.2% of the population are between 20 and 29 years old. 24 people or 15.9% are between 30 and 39, 28 people or 18.5% are between 40 and 49, and 16 people or 10.6% are between 50 and 59. The senior population distribution is 5 people or 3.3% of the population are between 60 and 69 years old, 13 people or 8.6% are between 70 and 79, there are 7 people or 4.6% who are between 80 and 89.

As of 2000, there were 48 people who were single and never married in the municipality. There were 71 married individuals, 4 widows or widowers and 9 individuals who are divorced.

As of 2000 the average number of residents per living room was 0.63 which is about equal to the cantonal average of 0.61 per room. In this case, a room is defined as space of a housing unit of at least 4 m² (43 sq ft) as normal bedrooms, dining rooms, living rooms, kitchens and habitable cellars and attics. About 40.4% of the total households were owner occupied, or in other words did not pay rent (though they may have a mortgage or a rent-to-own agreement).

As of 2000, there were 47 private households in the municipality, and an average of 2.5 persons per household. There were 10 households that consist of only one person and 1 households with five or more people. Out of a total of 48 households that answered this question, 20.8% were households made up of just one person. Of the rest of the households, there are 19 married couples without children, 16 married couples with children There were 2 households that were made up of unrelated people and 1 household that was made up of some sort of institution or another collective housing.

In 2000 there were 9 single family homes (or 33.3% of the total) out of a total of 27 inhabited buildings. There were 5 multi-family buildings (18.5%), along with 11 multi-purpose buildings that were mostly used for housing (40.7%) and 2 other use buildings (commercial or industrial) that also had some housing (7.4%).

In 2000, a total of 47 apartments (78.3% of the total) were permanently occupied, while 13 apartments (21.7%) were seasonally occupied. As of 2009, the construction rate of new housing units was 6.6 new units per 1000 residents. The vacancy rate for the municipality, in 2010, was 0%.

The historical population is given in the following chart:

== Politics ==
In the 2007 federal election the most popular party was the SVP which received 33.93% of the vote. The next three most popular parties were the FDP (22.22%), the SP (16.67%) and the PdA Party (12.3%). In the federal election, a total of 31 votes were cast, and the voter turnout was 39.2%.

== Economy ==
As of 2010, Essert-sous-Champvent had an unemployment rate of 3.7%. As of 2008, there were 17 people employed in the primary economic sector and about 6 businesses involved in this sector. 149 people were employed in the secondary sector and there were 2 businesses in this sector. 2 people were employed in the tertiary sector, with 2 businesses in this sector. There were 77 residents of the municipality who were employed in some capacity, of which females made up 35.1% of the workforce.

In 2008 the total number of full-time equivalent jobs was 159. The number of jobs in the primary sector was 15, of which 14 were in agriculture and 1 was in forestry or lumber production. The number of jobs in the secondary sector was 143 of which 136 or (95.1%) were in manufacturing and 7 (4.9%) were in construction. The number of jobs in the tertiary sector was 1. In the tertiary sector; 1 was in the sale or repair of motor vehicles, .

In 2000, there were 77 workers who commuted into the municipality and 26 workers who commuted away. The municipality is a net importer of workers, with about 3.0 workers entering the municipality for every one leaving. About 13.0% of the workforce coming into Essert-sous-Champvent are coming from outside Switzerland. Of the working population, 5.2% used public transportation to get to work, and 40.3% used a private car.

== Transport ==
The meter gauge electric Yverdon–Ste-Croix railway line links Essert-sous-Champvent with Yverdon-les-Bains and Sainte Croix.

== Religion ==
From the 2000 census, 54 or 40.9% were Roman Catholic, while 61 or 46.2% belonged to the Swiss Reformed Church. Of the rest of the population, there were 4 individuals (or about 3.03% of the population) who belonged to another Christian church. There was 1 individual who was Islamic. 12 (or about 9.09% of the population) belonged to no church, are agnostic or atheist, and 2 individuals (or about 1.52% of the population) did not answer the question.

== Education ==
In Essert-sous-Champvent about 36 or (27.3%) of the population have completed non-mandatory upper secondary education, and 9 or (6.8%) have completed additional higher education (either university or a Fachhochschule). Of the 9 who completed tertiary schooling, 66.7% were Swiss men, 33.3% were Swiss women.

In the 2009/2010 school year there were a total of 15 students in the Essert-sous-Champvent school district. In the Vaud cantonal school system, two years of non-obligatory pre-school are provided by the political districts. During the school year, the political district provided pre-school care for a total of 578 children of which 359 children (62.1%) received subsidized pre-school care. The canton's primary school program requires students to attend for four years. There were 7 students in the municipal primary school program. The obligatory lower secondary school program lasts for six years and there were 8 students in those schools.

As of 2000, there were 19 students from Essert-sous-Champvent who attended schools outside the municipality.
