= Suscévaz =

- Municipality
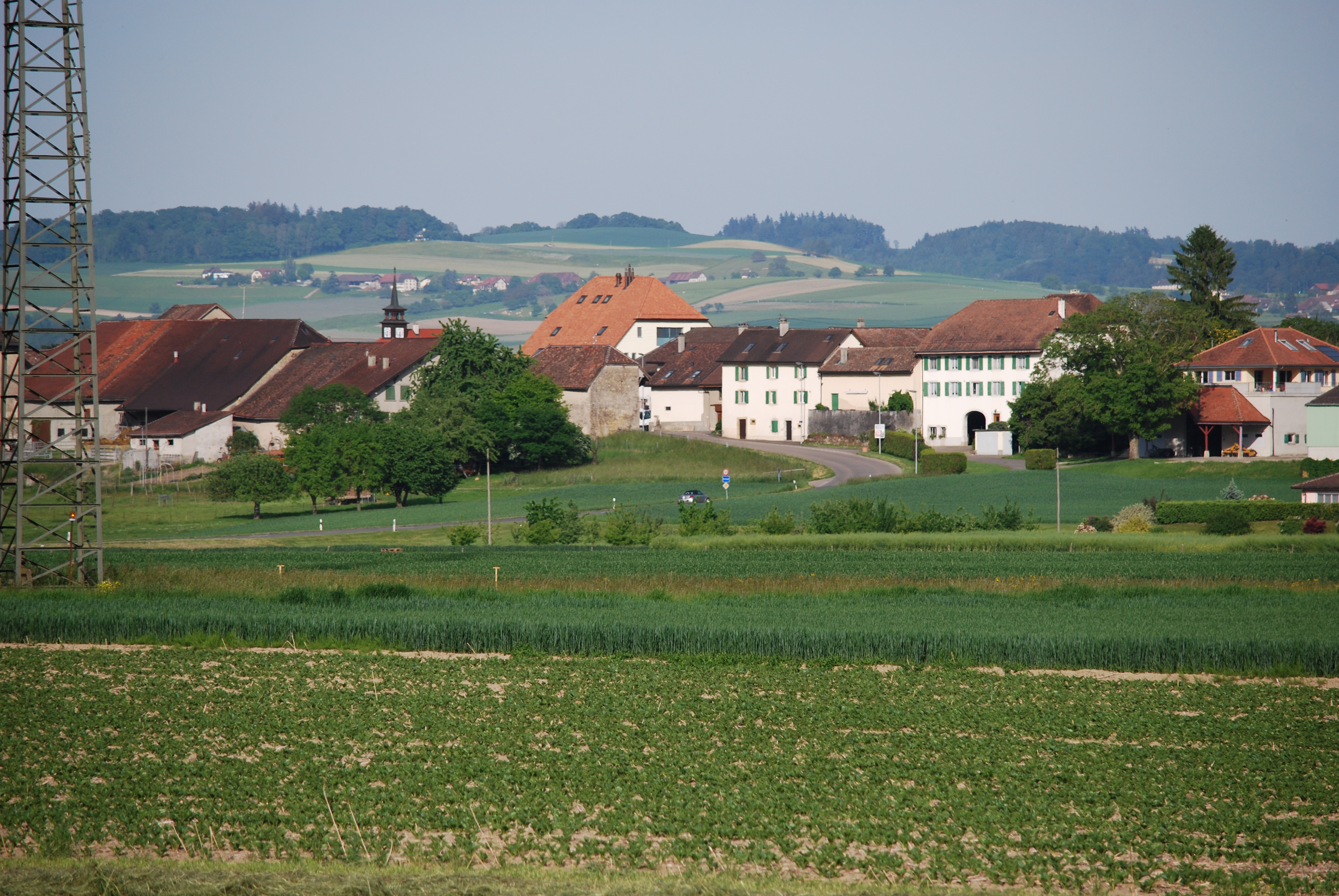

- Flag Coat of arms
- Location of Suscévaz
- Location within Switzerland Location within Canton of Vaud
- Coordinates: 46°46′N 6°35′E
- Country: Switzerland
- Canton: Vaud
- District: Jura-Nord Vaudois

Government
  - Mayor: Syndic

Area
  - Total: 4.15 km^{2} (1.60 sq mi)
- Elevation: 445 m (1,460 ft)

Population (2003)
  - Total: 175
  - Density: 42.2/km^{2} (109/sq mi)
- Time zone: UTC+01:00 (CET)
  - Summer (DST): UTC+02:00 (CEST)
- Postal code: 1437
- SFOS number: 5930
- ISO 3166 code: CH-VD
- Surrounded by: Chamblon, Champvent, Épendes, Mathod, Treycovagnes, Villars-sous-Champvent
- Website: www.suscevaz.ch

Suscévaz is a municipality in the district of Jura-Nord Vaudois of the canton of Vaud in Switzerland.

== History ==
Suscévaz is first mentioned in 1140 as Subsilva.

== Geography ==
Suscévaz has an area, as of 2009, of 4.2 square kilometers (1.6 mi^{2}). Of this area, 3.44 km^{2} (1.33 mi^{2}) or 82.9% is used for agricultural purposes, while 0.45 km^{2} (0.17 mi^{2}) or 10.8% is forested. Of the rest of the land, 0.16 km^{2} (0.062 mi^{2}) or 3.9% is settled (buildings or roads), 0.09 km^{2} (22 acres) or 2.2% is either rivers or lakes.

Of the built up area, housing and buildings made up 2.4% and transportation infrastructure made up 1.2%. Out of the forested land, 9.2% of the total land area is heavily forested and 1.7% is covered with orchards or small clusters of trees. Of the agricultural land, 76.1% is used for growing crops and 5.3% is pastures, while 1.4% is used for orchards or vine crops. All the water in the municipality is flowing water.

The municipality was part of the Yverdon District until it was dissolved on 31 August 2006, and Suscévaz became part of the new district of Jura-Nord Vaudois.

== Coat of arms ==
The blazon of the municipal coat of arms is Barry wavy of Six Gules and Vert, a Lion rampant Or.

== Demographics ==
Suscévaz has a population (as of December 2020) of 204. As of 2008, 5.2% of the population are resident foreign nationals. Over the last 10 years (1999–2009) the population has changed at a rate of 6.9%. It has changed at a rate of 7.4% due to migration and at a rate of 0% due to births and deaths.

Most of the population (as of 2000) speaks French (166 or 93.3%) as their first language, with Portuguese being second most common (7 or 3.9%) and German being third (3 or 1.7%).

The age distribution, as of 2009, in Suscévaz is; 15 children or 8.0% of the population are between 0 and 9 years old and 24 teenagers or 12.8% are between 10 and 19. Of the adult population, 19 people or 10.2% of the population are between 20 and 29 years old. 30 people or 16.0% are between 30 and 39, 27 people or 14.4% are between 40 and 49, and 25 people or 13.4% are between 50 and 59. The senior population distribution is 25 people or 13.4% of the population are between 60 and 69 years old, 12 people or 6.4% are between 70 and 79, there are 10 people or 5.3% who are between 80 and 89.

As of 2000, there were 68 people who were single and never married in the municipality. There were 94 married individuals, 12 widows or widowers and 4 individuals who are divorced.

As of 2000, there were 70 private households in the municipality, and an average of 2.5 persons per household. There were 20 households that consist of only one person and 8 households with five or more people. Out of a total of 74 households that answered this question, 27.0% were households made up of just one person. Of the rest of the households, there are 20 married couples without children, 25 married couples with children There were 3 single parents with a child or children. There were 2 households that were made up of unrelated people and 4 households that were made up of some sort of institution or another collective housing.

In 2000 there were 28 single family homes (or 52.8% of the total) out of a total of 53 inhabited buildings. There were 12 multi-family buildings (22.6%), along with 9 multi-purpose buildings that were mostly used for housing (17.0%) and 4 other use buildings (commercial or industrial) that also had some housing (7.5%).

In 2000, a total of 63 apartments (86.3% of the total) were permanently occupied, while 8 apartments (11.0%) were seasonally occupied and 2 apartments (2.7%) were empty. As of 2009, the construction rate of new housing units was 5.3 new units per 1000 residents. The vacancy rate for the municipality, in 2010, was 0%.

The historical population is given in the following chart:

== Politics ==
In the 2007 federal election the most popular party was the SVP which received 42.35% of the vote. The next three most popular parties were the SP (16.36%), the Green Party (15.61%) and the FDP (12.1%). In the federal election, a total of 81 votes were cast, and the voter turnout was 59.6%.

== Economy ==
As of 2010, Suscévaz had an unemployment rate of 2.8%. As of 2008, there were 27 people employed in the primary economic sector and about 9 businesses involved in this sector. 8 people were employed in the secondary sector and there was 1 business in this sector. 3 people were employed in the tertiary sector, with 1 business in this sector. There were 90 residents of the municipality who were employed in some capacity, of which females made up 41.1% of the workforce.

In 2008 the total number of full-time equivalent jobs was 30. The number of jobs in the primary sector was 20, all of which were in agriculture. The number of jobs in the secondary sector was 8, all of which were in manufacturing. The number of jobs in the tertiary sector was 2, both in education.

In 2000, there were 12 workers who commuted into the municipality and 61 workers who commuted away. The municipality is a net exporter of workers, with about 5.1 workers leaving the municipality for every one entering. Of the working population, 12.2% used public transportation to get to work, and 53.3% used a private car.

== Religion ==
From the 2000 census, 34 or 19.1% were Roman Catholic, while 110 or 61.8% belonged to the Swiss Reformed Church. Of the rest of the population, there were 16 individuals (or about 8.99% of the population) who belonged to another Christian church. 26 (or about 14.61% of the population) belonged to no church, are agnostic or atheist.

== Education ==
In Suscévaz about 64 or (36.0%) of the population have completed non-mandatory upper secondary education, and 13 or (7.3%) have completed additional higher education (either university or a Fachhochschule). Of the 13 who completed tertiary schooling, 92.3% were Swiss men, 7.7% were Swiss women.

In the 2009/2010 school year there were a total of 18 students in the Suscévaz school district. In the Vaud cantonal school system, two years of non-obligatory pre-school are provided by the political districts. During the school year, the political district provided pre-school care for a total of 578 children of which 359 children (62.1%) received subsidized pre-school care. The canton's primary school program requires students to attend for four years. There were 10 students in the municipal primary school program. The obligatory lower secondary school program lasts for six years and there were 8 students in those schools.

As of 2000, there were 16 students in Suscévaz who came from another municipality, while 31 residents attended schools outside the municipality.
