= Henie =

Henie is the surname of:

- Sonja Henie (1912–1969), Norwegian Olympic and world champion figure skater and film star
- Marit Henie (1925–2012), Norwegian figure skater, cousin of Sonja Henie
- Wilhelm Henie (1872–1937), Norwegian track cycling world champion, speed skater and coach and manager of his daughter, Sonja Henie

== See also ==
- Henny, a list of people with the given name or surname
- Hennie, a list of people with the given name, nickname or surname
