= Champvent Castle =

Castle in Champvent, Switzerland

- Champvent in Switzerland
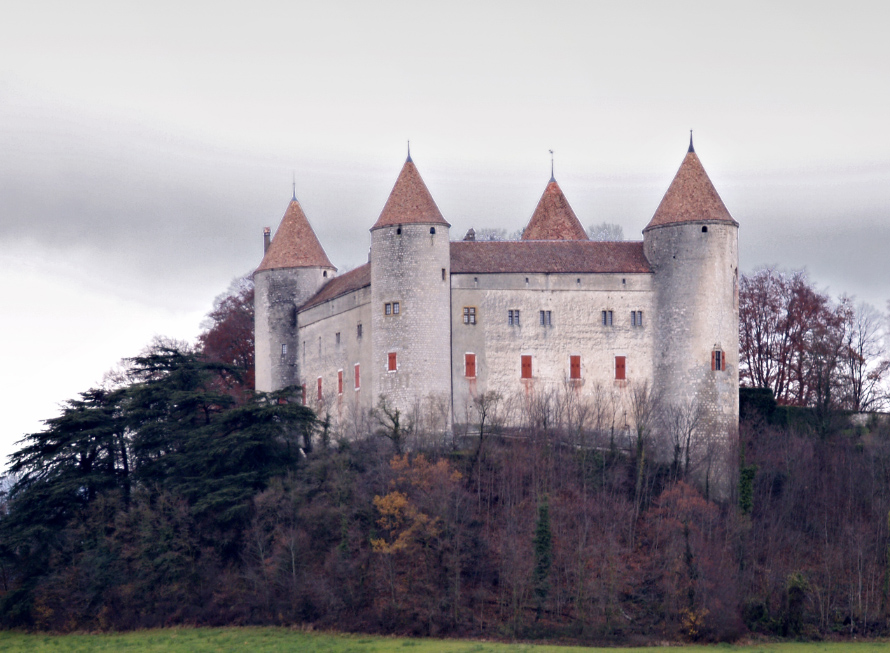

Location
- Coordinates: 46°46′44″N 6°34′16″E

Site history
- Built: 1250

Garrison information
- Occupants: Ebal IV de Grandson

Swiss Cultural Property of National Significance

Champvent Castle is a castle in the municipality of Champvent of the Canton of Vaud in Switzerland. It is a Swiss heritage site of national significance.

== See also ==
- List of castles in Switzerland
- Château
