= Hennie =

Hennie is a given name, often a short form (hypocorism) of Hendrik, Henry, Hendrick, Henrique, Henriette, Henrietta, Harriett, Harrietta, or Hendrickus. It may refer to:

== Men ==
- Hennie Aucamp (1934–2014), South African Afrikaans poet, short story writer, cabaretist and academic
- Hennie Bekker (born 1934), Zambian-born composer, arranger, producer and keyboardist now based in Canada
- Hendrik Hennie Bester, South African rear admiral who served in the South African Navy from 1968 to 2008
- Hennie Binneman (1914–1968), South African cyclist
- Hendrik Hennie Daniller (born 1984), South African rugby union footballer
- Hendrikus Hennie Dompeling (born 1966), Dutch sport shooter
- Hendrikus Hennie Hollink (1931–2018), Dutch former football player and manager
- Hennie Jacobs (born 1981), South African-born musician, songwriter and actor
- Hendrikus Hennie Keetelaar (1927-2002), Dutch water polo player
- Hendrikus Hennie Kuiper (born 1949), Dutch former road racing cyclist and Olympic and world champion
- Hendrik Hennie le Roux (born 1967), South African former rugby union footballer
- Hendrik Hennie Muller (1922-1977), South African rugby union footballer
- Hendrik Hennie Otto (born 1976), South African golfer
- Heinrich Hennie Quentemeijer (1920-1974), Dutch Olympic heavyweight boxer
- Alfred Henry Hennie Skorbinski (born 1990), South African rugby union player
- Henry Smoyer (1890–1958), Major League Baseball player in 1912
- Hennie Spijkerman (born 1950), Dutch football coach and manager and former goalkeeper
- Henrikus Hennie Stamsnijder (born 1954), Dutch former cyclo-cross and road racing cyclist

== Women ==
- Hendrika Hennie Penterman (born 1951), Dutch former swimmer
- Hennie Top (born 1956), Dutch former cyclist
- Hennie van der Velde (born 1944), Dutch swimmer
- H’Hen Nie (born 1992), Vietnamese beauty pageant finished in Top 5 at Miss Universe 2018

== See also ==
- Henny
- Henie
