= Alan I. Green =

American psychiatrist (1943–2020)

- Born: Alan Ivan Green; November 7, 1943; Norwalk, Connecticut
- Died: November 26, 2020 (aged 77)
- Education: Columbia College; Johns Hopkins School of Medicine
- Occupation: Psychiatrist
- Spouse: Frances Cohen (m. 1983)
- Relatives: Herman Wouk (uncle); Victor Wouk (uncle)
- Medical career
- Institutions: Harvard Medical School; Geisel School of Medicine

Alan Ivan Green (November 7, 1943 – November 26, 2020) was an American psychiatrist. He was the Raymond Sobel Professor of Psychiatry at Geisel School of Medicine and longtime chairman of the school's psychiatry department.

== Biography ==
Green was born on November 7, 1943, in Norwalk, Connecticut, to Dr. Howard and Irene Wouk Green. His mother was the sister of writer Herman Wouk and inventor Victor Wouk. He attended public schools and received his B.A. in history from Columbia University in 1965. He then received his medical degree from the Johns Hopkins School of Medicine, working in the lab of Solomon H. Snyder. While in medical school, Green took a summer course at University of San Francisco, where he studied patients impaired by substance abuse, kindling his interest in studying substance abuse and chronic mental illness.

Green completed his internship at Beth Israel Hospital in Boston and subsequently entered the United States Public Health Service as a staff associate at the National Institute for Mental Health and a personal assistant to Jerome Jaffe, President Richard Nixon's drug Czar. After two years, he began his residency at Massachusetts Mental Health Center, but was beset by an illness caused by a cytomegalic virus that left him bedridden for seven years. He completed his residency after his recovery.

Under the guidance of Drs. Carl Salzman and Joseph J. Schildkraut, Green commenced his career in psychiatric research. His research focused on the pharmacological treatment of schizophrenia, especially with clozapine. Green's research suggested that clozapine could limit alcohol and other substance use in patients with schizophrenia. He was an associate professor at Harvard Medical School, directing its Commonwealth Research Center based in the Massachusetts Mental Health Center.

Green became chairman and Raymond Sobel Professor of Psychiatry at Dartmouth Medical School in 2002, and served in this position for the next 18 years.

Green was a fellow of the American College of Neuropsychopharmacology.

== Personal life ==
Green married Frances Cohen, a Columbia-trained lawyer, in 1983. He died on November 26, 2020.
