= Champvent =

- Municipality
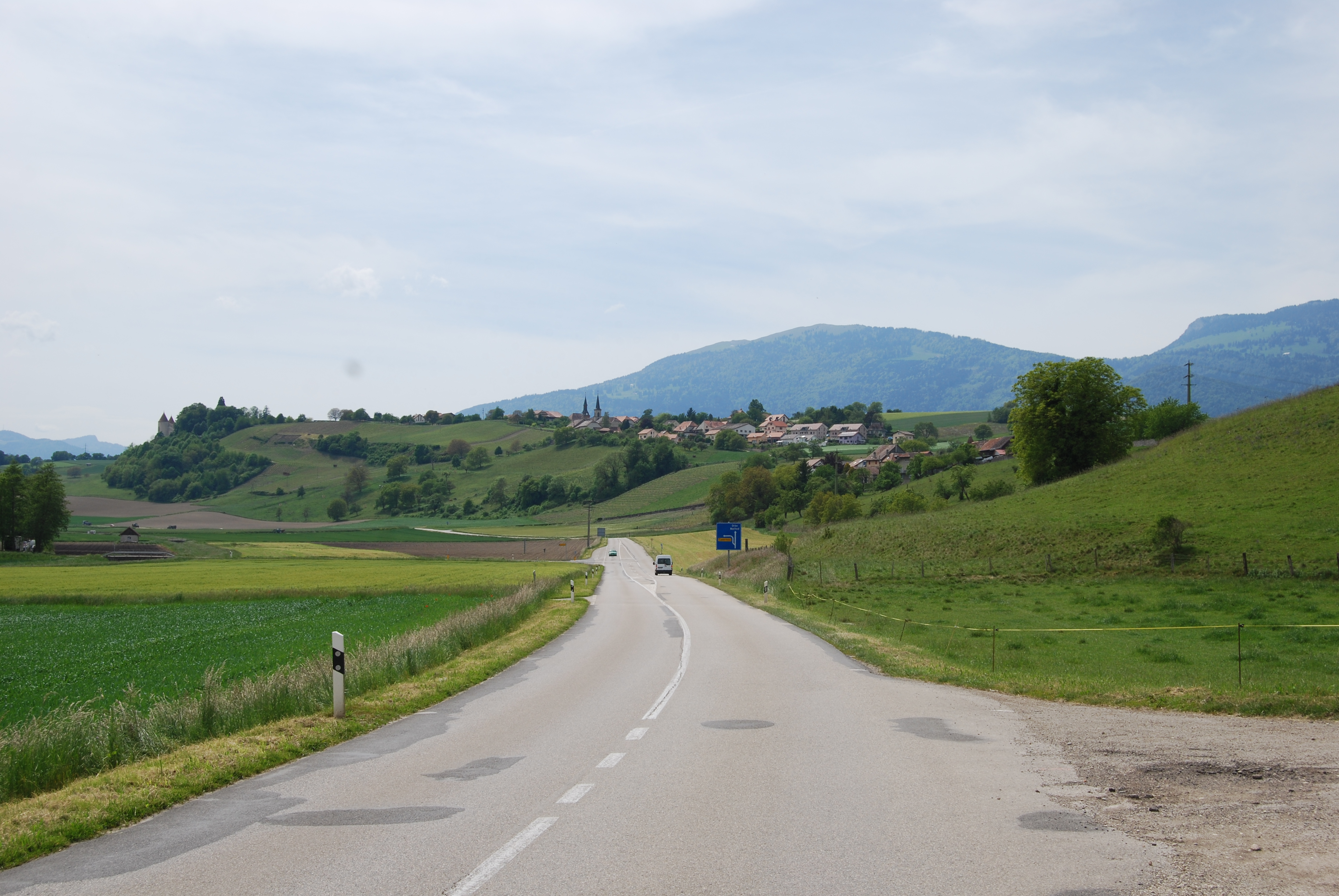

- Flag Coat of arms
- Location of Champvent
- Location within Switzerland Location within Canton of Vaud
- Coordinates: 46°47′N 6°34′E
- Country: Switzerland
- Canton: Vaud
- District: Jura-Nord Vaudois

Government
  - Mayor: Syndic

Area
  - Total: 6.88 km^{2} (2.66 sq mi)
- Elevation: 530 m (1,740 ft)

Population (2003)
  - Total: 316
  - Density: 45.9/km^{2} (119/sq mi)
- Time zone: UTC+01:00 (CET)
  - Summer (DST): UTC+02:00 (CEST)
- Postal code: 1443
- SFOS number: 5905
- ISO 3166 code: CH-VD
- Surrounded by: Baulmes, Essert-sous-Champvent, Mathod, Orges, Rances, Suscévaz, Valeyres-sous-Montagny, Villars-sous-Champvent, Vuiteboeuf
- Website: https://www.champvent.ch Profile (in French), SFSO statistics

Champvent (French pronunciation: [ʃɑ̃vɑ̃]) is a municipality in the district of Jura-Nord Vaudois of the canton of Vaud in Switzerland. The municipalities of Essert-sous-Champvent and Villars-sous-Champvent merged on 1 January 2012 into Champvent.

== History ==
Champvent is first mentioned in 1011 as Canvent. In 1013 it was mentioned as Canventum and in 1228 as Chanvent.

== Geography ==
Aerial view (1949)

Champvent has an area, as of 2009, of 6.9 square kilometers (2.7 mi^{2}). Of this area, 4.77 km^{2} (1.84 mi^{2}) or 68.9% is used for agricultural purposes, while 1.77 km^{2} (0.68 mi^{2}) or 25.6% is forested. Of the rest of the land, 0.3 km^{2} (0.12 mi^{2}) or 4.3% is settled (buildings or roads), 0.01 km^{2} (2.5 acres) or 0.1% is either rivers or lakes and 0.02 km^{2} (4.9 acres) or 0.3% is unproductive land. After the merger, the total area was 9.03 km^{2} (3.49 sq mi).

Of the built up area, housing and buildings made up 1.9% and transportation infrastructure made up 2.2%. Out of the forested land, 24.1% of the total land area is heavily forested and 1.4% is covered with orchards or small clusters of trees. Of the agricultural land, 56.8% is used for growing crops and 10.1% is pastures, while 2.0% is used for orchards or vine crops. All the water in the municipality is flowing water.

The municipality was part of the Yverdon District until it was dissolved on 31 August 2006, and Champvent became part of the new district of Jura-Nord Vaudois.

The municipality is located at the foot of the Jura Mountains. It consists of the village of Champvent, the hamlet of Saint-Christophe and the enclave of Mornens.

== Coat of arms ==
The blazon of the municipal coat of arms is Paly Argent and Azure with Fess enhanced in Gules surmounting.

== Demographics ==
Champvent has a population (as of December 2020) of 696. As of 2008, 12.1% of the population are resident foreign nationals. Over the last 10 years (1999–2009 ) the population has changed at a rate of 20.2%. It has changed at a rate of 12.8% due to migration and at a rate of 7.7% due to births and deaths.

Most of the population (as of 2000) speaks French (281 or 94.0%) as their first language, with German being second most common (9 or 3.0%) and Spanish being third (4 or 1.3%).

The age distribution, as of 2009, in Champvent is; 56 children or 15.7% of the population are between 0 and 9 years old and 46 teenagers or 12.9% are between 10 and 19. Of the adult population, 39 people or 10.9% of the population are between 20 and 29 years old. 53 people or 14.8% are between 30 and 39, 47 people or 13.2% are between 40 and 49, and 45 people or 12.6% are between 50 and 59. The senior population distribution is 39 people or 10.9% of the population are between 60 and 69 years old, 15 people or 4.2% are between 70 and 79, there are 16 people or 4.5% who are between 80 and 89, and there is 1 person who is 90 and older.

As of 2000, there were 124 people who were single and never married in the municipality. There were 155 married individuals, 15 widows or widowers and 5 individuals who are divorced.

As of 2000 the average number of residents per living room was 0.6 which is about equal to the cantonal average of 0.61 per room. In this case, a room is defined as space of a housing unit of at least 4 m² (43 sq ft) as normal bedrooms, dining rooms, living rooms, kitchens and habitable cellars and attics. About 49.5% of the total households were owner occupied, or in other words did not pay rent (though they may have a mortgage or a rent-to-own agreement).

As of 2000, there were 113 private households in the municipality, and an average of 2.6 persons per household. There were 26 households that consist of only one person and 10 households with five or more people. Out of a total of 115 households that answered this question, 22.6% were households made up of just one person and there was 1 adult who lived with their parents. Of the rest of the households, there are 33 married couples without children, 47 married couples with children There were 4 single parents with a child or children. There were 2 households that were made up of unrelated people and 2 households that were made up of some sort of institution or another collective housing.

In 2000 there were 43 single family homes (or 51.8% of the total) out of a total of 83 inhabited buildings. There were 12 multi-family buildings (14.5%), along with 24 multi-purpose buildings that were mostly used for housing (28.9%) and 4 other use buildings (commercial or industrial) that also had some housing (4.8%).

In 2000, a total of 109 apartments (89.3% of the total) were permanently occupied, while 10 apartments (8.2%) were seasonally occupied and 3 apartments (2.5%) were empty. As of 2009, the construction rate of new housing units was 16.8 new units per 1000 residents. The vacancy rate for the municipality, in 2010, was 1.42%.

The historical population is given in the following chart:

== Heritage sites of national significance ==
Champvent Castle and the Manoir de Saint-Christophe are listed as Swiss heritage site of national significance. The Champvent village and surrounding region as well as the area around Saint-Christophe are part of the Inventory of Swiss Heritage Sites.

== Politics ==
In the 2007 federal election the most popular party was the SVP which received 45.68% of the vote. The next three most popular parties were the SP (15.02%), the Green Party (10.41%) and the FDP (10.32%). In the federal election, a total of 122 votes were cast, and the voter turnout was 52.8%.

== Economy ==
As of 2010, Champvent had an unemployment rate of 2.5%. As of 2008, there were 33 people employed in the primary economic sector and about 11 businesses involved in this sector. 20 people were employed in the secondary sector and there were 6 businesses in this sector. 32 people were employed in the tertiary sector, with 8 businesses in this sector. There were 167 residents of the municipality who were employed in some capacity, of which females made up 41.3% of the workforce.

In 2008 the total number of full-time equivalent jobs was 68. The number of jobs in the primary sector was 24, all of which were in agriculture. The number of jobs in the secondary sector was 18 of which 13 or (72.2%) were in manufacturing and 5 (27.8%) were in construction. The number of jobs in the tertiary sector was 26. In the tertiary sector; 3 or 11.5% were in wholesale or retail sales or the repair of motor vehicles, 1 was in the movement and storage of goods, 4 or 15.4% were in a hotel or restaurant, 14 or 53.8% were technical professionals or scientists, 4 or 15.4% were in education.

In 2000, there were 25 workers who commuted into the municipality and 112 workers who commuted away. The municipality is a net exporter of workers, with about 4.5 workers leaving the municipality for every one entering. Of the working population, 6.6% used public transportation to get to work, and 62.3% used a private car.

== Religion ==
From the 2000 census, 36 or 12.0% were Roman Catholic, while 234 or 78.3% belonged to the Swiss Reformed Church. Of the rest of the population, there were 2 members of an Orthodox church (or about 0.67% of the population). There was 1 individual who was Jewish, and there was 1 individual who was Islamic. 23 (or about 7.69% of the population) belonged to no church, are agnostic or atheist, and 2 individuals (or about 0.67% of the population) did not answer the question.

== Education ==
In Champvent about 131 or (43.8%) of the population have completed non-mandatory upper secondary education, and 36 or (12.0%) have completed additional higher education (either university or a Fachhochschule). Of the 36 who completed tertiary schooling, 72.2% were Swiss men, 27.8% were Swiss women.

In the 2009/2010 school year there were a total of 60 students in the Champvent school district. In the Vaud cantonal school system, two years of non-obligatory pre-school are provided by the political districts. During the school year, the political district provided pre-school care for a total of 578 children of which 359 children (62.1%) received subsidized pre-school care. The canton's primary school program requires students to attend for four years. There were 32 students in the municipal primary school program. The obligatory lower secondary school program lasts for six years and there were 28 students in those schools.

As of 2000, there were 49 students in Champvent who came from another municipality, while 26 residents attended schools outside the municipality.
