= Montagny-près-Yverdon =

- Municipality
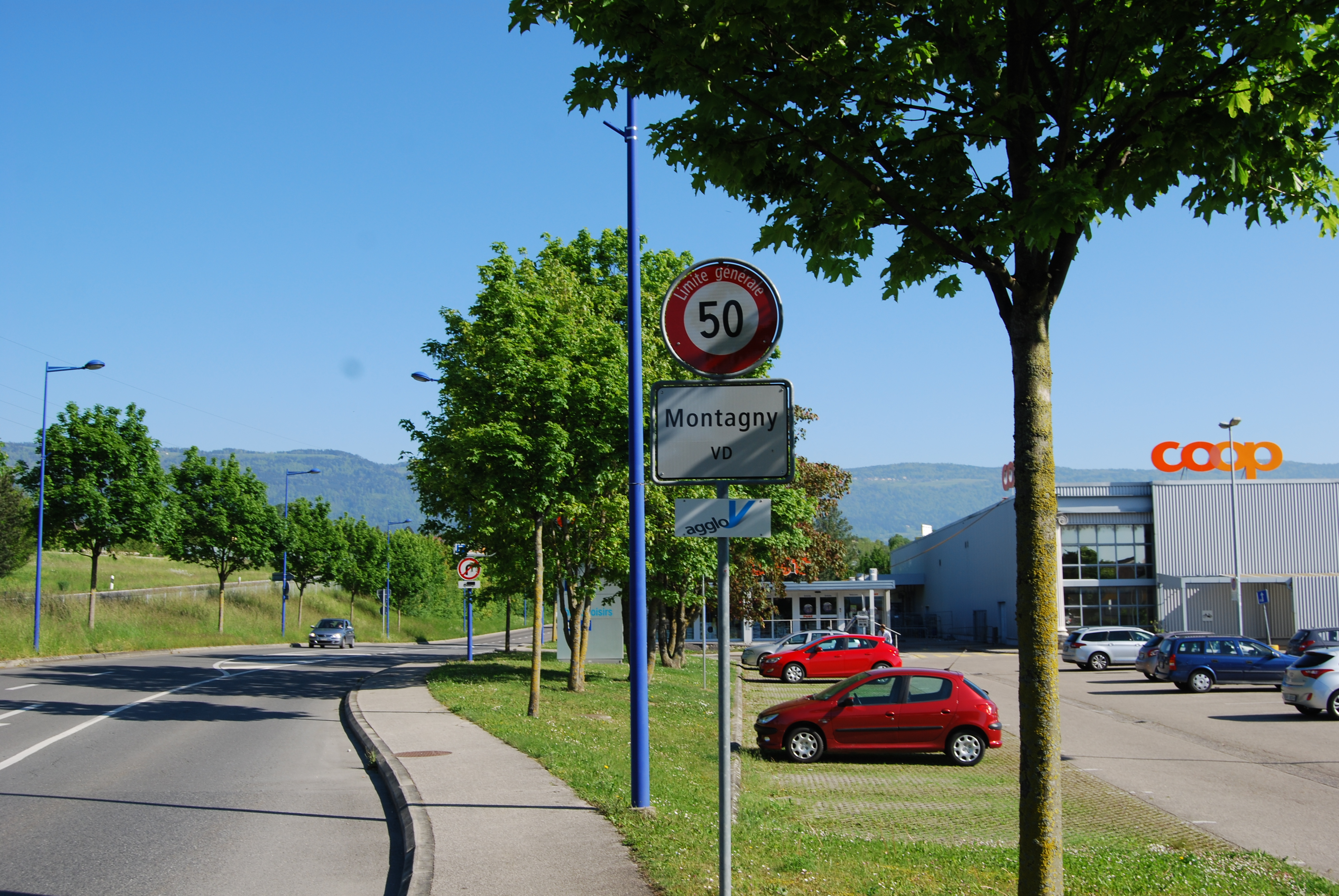

- Flag Coat of arms
- Location of Montagny-près-Yverdon
- Location within Switzerland Location within Canton of Vaud
- Coordinates: 46°47′N 6°37′E
- Country: Switzerland
- Canton: Vaud
- District: Jura-Nord Vaudois

Government
  - Mayor: Syndic

Area
  - Total: 3.55 km^{2} (1.37 sq mi)
- Elevation: 455 m (1,493 ft)

Population (2003)
  - Total: 609
  - Density: 172/km^{2} (444/sq mi)
- Time zone: UTC+01:00 (CET)
  - Summer (DST): UTC+02:00 (CEST)
- Postal code: 1442
- SFOS number: 5922
- ISO 3166 code: CH-VD
- Surrounded by: Chamblon, Essert-sous-Champvent, Grandson, Treycovagnes, Valeyres-sous-Montagny, Villars-sous-Champvent, Yverdon-les-Bains
- Website: www.montagny.ch

Montagny-près-Yverdon is a municipality in the district of Jura-Nord Vaudois of the canton of Vaud in Switzerland.

== History ==
Montagny-près-Yverdon is first mentioned around 995-96 as in villa Montaniaco. In 1397 it was mentioned as Montaigny-le-Courbe.

Its history goes back to at least the 12th century, but the medieval castle and church no longer exist. The current church, with two bells, was built in 1769. At one time on the Roman road connecting Yverdon with Sainte-Croix, it is now on an autoroute.

== Geography ==
Montagny-près-Yverdon has an area, as of 2009, of 3.5 square kilometers (1.4 mi^{2}). Of this area, 2.46 km^{2} (0.95 mi^{2}) or 69.9% is used for agricultural purposes, while 0.23 km^{2} (0.089 mi^{2}) or 6.5% is forested. Of the rest of the land, 0.79 km^{2} (0.31 mi^{2}) or 22.4% is settled (buildings or roads), 0.02 km^{2} (4.9 acres) or 0.6% is either rivers or lakes.

Of the built up area, industrial buildings made up 5.4% of the total area while housing and buildings made up 4.8% and transportation infrastructure made up 9.9%. Power and water infrastructure as well as other special developed areas made up 2.0% of the area Out of the forested land, all of the forested land area is covered with heavy forests. Of the agricultural land, 56.5% is used for growing crops and 8.5% is pastures, while 4.8% is used for orchards or vine crops. All the water in the village is flowing water.

The municipality was part of the Yverdon District until it was dissolved on 31 August 2006, and Montagny-près-Yverdon became part of the new district of Jura-Nord Vaudois.

The municipal area stretches from the hills around the village, over the Brinaz stream and to the banks of the Orbe.

== Coat of arms ==
The blazon of the municipal coat of arms is Argent, a Crayfish-claw Gules. The crayfish claw is the missing claw from the coat of arms of the municipality of Onnens and represents the division of the two municipalities.

== Demographics ==
Montagny-près-Yverdon has a population (as of December 2020) of 738. As of 2008, 14.4% of the population are resident foreign nationals. Over the last 10 years (1999–2009) the population has changed at a rate of 8.7%. It has changed at a rate of 6.6% due to migration and at a rate of 3.5% due to births and deaths.

Most of the population (as of 2000) speaks French (536 or 88.4%) as their first language, with German being second most common (21 or 3.5%) and Italian being third (17 or 2.8%).

The age distribution, as of 2009, in Montagny-près-Yverdon is; 75 children or 11.1% of the population are between 0 and 9 years old and 85 teenagers or 12.6% are between 10 and 19. Of the adult population, 81 people or 12.0% of the population are between 20 and 29 years old. 93 people or 13.8% are between 30 and 39, 101 people or 15.0% are between 40 and 49, and 111 people or 16.4% are between 50 and 59. The senior population distribution is 68 people or 10.1% of the population are between 60 and 69 years old, 43 people or 6.4% are between 70 and 79, there are 16 people or 2.4% who are between 80 and 89, and there are 2 people or 0.3% who are 90 and older.

As of 2000, there were 258 people who were single and never married in the village. There were 287 married individuals, 31 widows or widowers and 30 individuals who are divorced.

As of 2000, there were 241 private households in the village, and an average of 2.5 persons per household. There were 71 households that consist of only one person and 26 households with five or more people. Out of a total of 246 households that answered this question, 28.9% were households made up of just one person and there was 1 adult who lived with their parents. Of the rest of the households, there are 64 married couples without children, 88 married couples with children There were 12 single parents with a child or children. There were 5 households that were made up of unrelated people and 5 households that were made up of some sort of institution or another collective housing.

In 2000 there were 113 single family homes (or 63.1% of the total) out of a total of 179 inhabited buildings. There were 28 multi-family buildings (15.6%), along with 22 multi-purpose buildings that were mostly used for housing (12.3%) and 16 other use buildings (commercial or industrial) that also had some housing (8.9%).

In 2000, a total of 229 apartments (93.1% of the total) were permanently occupied, while 15 apartments (6.1%) were seasonally occupied and 2 apartments (0.8%) were empty. As of 2009, the construction rate of new housing units was 7.4 new units per 1000 residents. The vacancy rate for the village, in 2010, was 0%.

The historical population is given in the following chart:

== Politics ==
In the 2007 federal election the most popular party was the SP which received 24.89% of the vote. The next three most popular parties were the SVP (23.04%), the Green Party (14.85%) and the FDP (9.92%). In the federal election, a total of 191 votes were cast, and the voter turnout was 45.6%.

== Economy ==
As of 2010, Montagny-près-Yverdon had an unemployment rate of 3.4%. As of 2008, there were 25 people employed in the primary economic sector and about 8 businesses involved in this sector. 213 people were employed in the secondary sector and there were 28 businesses in this sector. 920 people were employed in the tertiary sector, with 90 businesses in this sector. There were 334 residents of the village who were employed in some capacity, of which females made up 44.0% of the workforce.

In 2008 the total number of full-time equivalent jobs was 934. The number of jobs in the primary sector was 18, all of which were in agriculture. The number of jobs in the secondary sector was 194 of which 121 or (62.4%) were in manufacturing and 73 (37.6%) were in construction. The number of jobs in the tertiary sector was 722. In the tertiary sector; 479 or 66.3% were in wholesale or retail sales or the repair of motor vehicles, 9 or 1.2% were in the movement and storage of goods, 74 or 10.2% were in a hotel or restaurant, 7 or 1.0% were in the information industry, 30 or 4.2% were the insurance or financial industry, 61 or 8.4% were technical professionals or scientists, and 21 or 2.9% were in health care.

In 2000, there were 626 workers who commuted into the village and 239 workers who commuted away. The village is a net importer of workers, with about 2.6 workers entering the village for every one leaving. About 4.6% of the workforce coming into Montagny-près-Yverdon are coming from outside Switzerland. Of the working population, 14.1% used public transportation to get to work, and 60.2% used a private car.

== Religion ==
From the 2000 census, 146 or 24.1% were Roman Catholic, while 317 or 52.3% belonged to the Swiss Reformed Church. Of the rest of the population, there were 13 members of an Orthodox church (or about 2.15% of the population), there was 1 individual who belongs to the Christian Catholic Church, and there were 37 individuals (or about 6.11% of the population) who belonged to another Christian church. There were 4 (or about 0.66% of the population) who were Islamic. 97 (or about 16.01% of the population) belonged to no church, are agnostic or atheist, and 9 individuals (or about 1.49% of the population) did not answer the question.

== Education ==
In Montagny-près-Yverdon about 227 or (37.5%) of the population have completed non-mandatory upper secondary education, and 91 or (15.0%) have completed additional higher education (either university or a Fachhochschule). Of the 91 who completed tertiary schooling, 52.7% were Swiss men, 30.8% were Swiss women, 11.0% were non-Swiss men and 5.5% were non-Swiss women.

In the 2009/2010 school year there were a total of 77 students in the Montagny-près-Yverdon school district. In the Vaud cantonal school system, two years of non-obligatory pre-school are provided by the political districts. During the school year, the political district provided pre-school care for a total of 578 children of which 359 children (62.1%) received subsidized pre-school care. The canton's primary school program requires students to attend for four years. There were 43 students in the municipal primary school program. The obligatory lower secondary school program lasts for six years and there were 34 students in those schools.

As of 2000, there were 53 students in Montagny-près-Yverdon who came from another village, while 107 residents attended schools outside the village.

== Notable people ==
- Phil Henny (born 1943), racing mechanic, driver, and author
