= Chamblon =

- Municipality
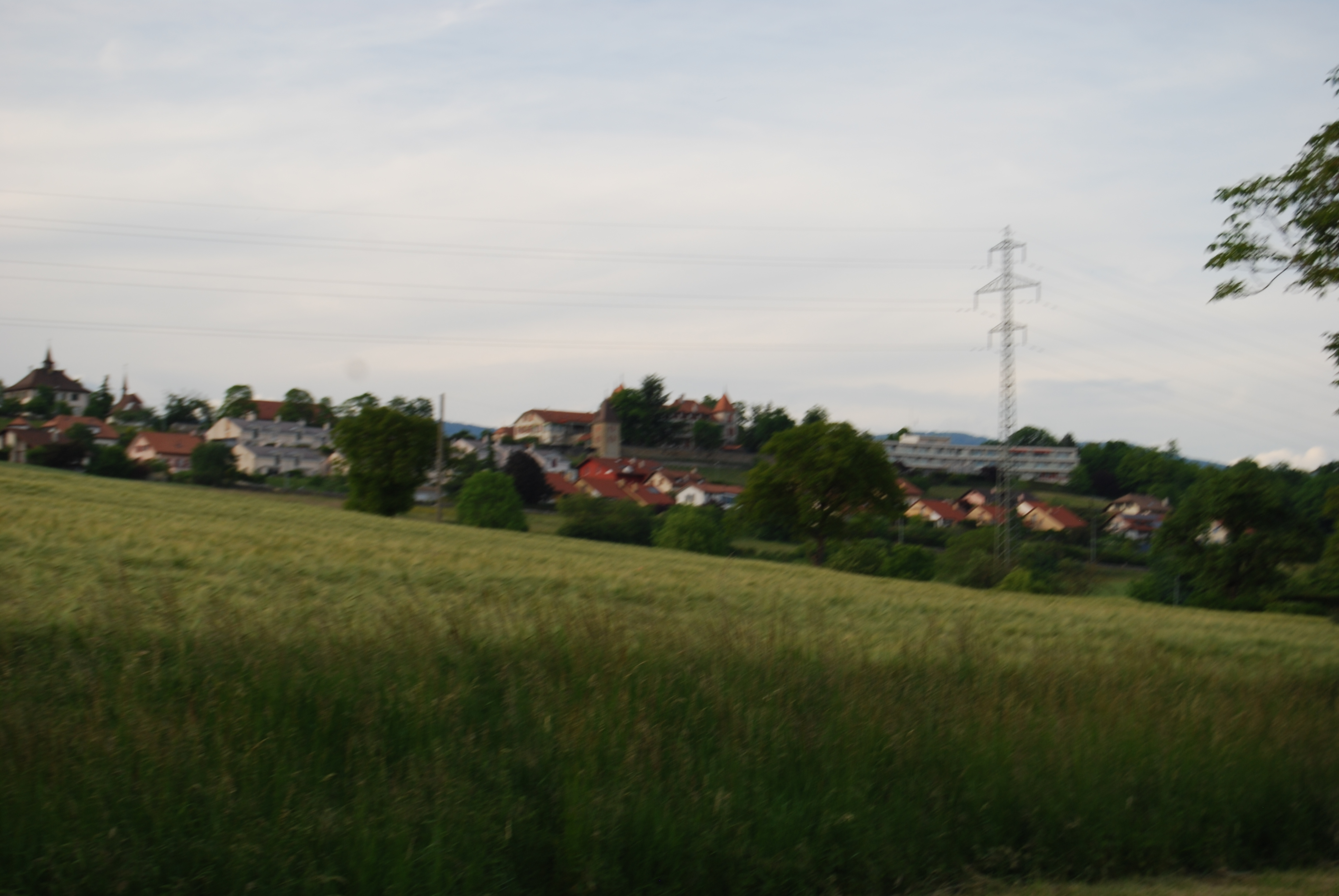

- Flag Coat of arms
- Location of Chamblon
- Location within Switzerland Location within Canton of Vaud
- Coordinates: 46°47′N 6°36′E
- Country: Switzerland
- Canton: Vaud
- District: Jura-Nord Vaudois

Government
  - Mayor: Syndic

Area
  - Total: 2.85 km^{2} (1.10 sq mi)
- Elevation: 519 m (1,703 ft)

Population (2003)
  - Total: 557
  - Density: 195/km^{2} (506/sq mi)
- Time zone: UTC+01:00 (CET)
  - Summer (DST): UTC+02:00 (CEST)
- Postal code: 1436
- SFOS number: 5904
- ISO 3166 code: CH-VD
- Surrounded by: Montagny-près-Yverdon, Suscévaz, Treycovagnes, Villars-sous-Champvent
- Twin towns: Bellegarde-en-Marche (France)
- Website: www.chamblon.ch

Chamblon is a municipality in the district of Jura-Nord Vaudois of the canton of Vaud in Switzerland.

== History ==
Chamblon is first mentioned in the 12th century as Chamblon.

== Geography ==
Chamblon has an area, as of 2009, of 2.9 square kilometers (1.1 mi^{2}). Of this area, 1.43 km^{2} (0.55 mi^{2}) or 50.0% is used for agricultural purposes, while 0.66 km^{2} (0.25 mi^{2}) or 23.1% is forested. Of the rest of the land, 0.71 km^{2} (0.27 mi^{2}) or 24.8% is settled (buildings or roads), 0.02 km^{2} (4.9 acres) or 0.7% is either rivers or lakes and 0.05 km^{2} (12 acres) or 1.7% is unproductive land.

Of the built up area, housing and buildings made up 16.8% and transportation infrastructure made up 6.6%. Out of the forested land, 21.0% of the total land area is heavily forested and 2.1% is covered with orchards or small clusters of trees. Of the agricultural land, 24.5% is used for growing crops and 23.8% is pastures, while 1.7% is used for orchards or vine crops. All the water in the municipality is flowing water.

The municipality was part of the Yverdon District until it was dissolved on 31 August 2006, and Chamblon became part of the new district of Jura-Nord Vaudois.

The municipality is located on a former lake surrounded by red limestone hills. It is located on a hill overlooking Yverdon and the Lake of Neuchatel. Notable geographical features are marshy, environmentally protected areas, steep hills, and high exposure to the wind. It also has a view of the Jura Mountains. The nearest major towns are Yverdon (2 km (1.2 mi)) and Lausanne (30 km (19 mi)).

== Coat of arms ==
The blazon of the municipal coat of arms is Or, a deer's head gardant Sable lined Argent, between antlers a grape bunch Gules.

== Demographics ==
Chamblon has a population (as of December 2020) of 560. As of 2008, 12.2% of the population are resident foreign nationals. Over the last 10 years (1999–2009 ) the population has changed at a rate of 23.2%. It has changed at a rate of 22.1% due to migration and at a rate of 1.3% due to births and deaths.

Most of the population (as of 2000) speaks French (471 or 91.8%) as their first language, with German being second most common (26 or 5.1%) and Italian being third (8 or 1.6%).

The age distribution, as of 2009, in Chamblon is; 54 children or 9.5% of the population are between 0 and 9 years old and 77 teenagers or 13.6% are between 10 and 19. Of the adult population, 73 people or 12.9% of the population are between 20 and 29 years old. 77 people or 13.6% are between 30 and 39, 88 people or 15.5% are between 40 and 49, and 105 people or 18.5% are between 50 and 59. The senior population distribution is 54 people or 9.5% of the population are between 60 and 69 years old, 20 people or 3.5% are between 70 and 79, there are 17 people or 3.0% who are between 80 and 89, and there are 3 people or 0.5% who are 90 and older.

As of 2000, there were 235 people who were single and never married in the municipality. There were 232 married individuals, 23 widows or widowers and 23 individuals who are divorced.

As of 2000 the average number of residents per living room was 0.63 which is about equal to the cantonal average of 0.61 per room. In this case, a room is defined as space of a housing unit of at least 4 m^{2} (43 sq ft) as normal bedrooms, dining rooms, living rooms, kitchens and habitable cellars and attics. About 63.6% of the total households were owner occupied, or in other words did not pay rent (though they may have a mortgage or a rent-to-own agreement).

As of 2000, there were 184 private households in the municipality, and an average of 2.6 persons per household. There were 56 households that consist of only one person and 21 households with five or more people. Out of a total of 195 households that answered this question, 28.7% were households made up of just one person and there was 1 adult who lived with their parents. Of the rest of the households, there are 41 married couples without children, 65 married couples with children There were 18 single parents with a child or children. There were 3 households that were made up of unrelated people and 11 households that were made up of some sort of institution or another collective housing.

In 2000 there were 90 single family homes (or 69.2% of the total) out of a total of 130 inhabited buildings. There were 20 multi-family buildings (15.4%), along with 13 multi-purpose buildings that were mostly used for housing (10.0%) and 7 other use buildings (commercial or industrial) that also had some housing (5.4%).

In 2000, a total of 154 apartments (75.9% of the total) were permanently occupied, while 42 apartments (20.7%) were seasonally occupied and 7 apartments (3.4%) were empty. As of 2009, the construction rate of new housing units was 0 new units per 1000 residents. The vacancy rate for the municipality, in 2010, was 0.81%.

The historical population is given in the following chart:

== Politics ==
In the 2007 federal election the most popular party was the SVP which received 23.8% of the vote. The next three most popular parties were the SP (22.28%), the FDP (13.23%) and the Green Party (12.05%). In the federal election, a total of 176 votes were cast, and the voter turnout was 44.6%.

== Economy ==
As of 2010, Chamblon had an unemployment rate of 2.1%. As of 2008, there were 3 people employed in the primary economic sector and about 2 businesses involved in this sector. 26 people were employed in the secondary sector and there were 9 businesses in this sector. 242 people were employed in the tertiary sector, with 13 businesses in this sector. There were 274 residents of the municipality who were employed in some capacity, of which females made up 40.9% of the workforce.

In 2008 the total number of full-time equivalent jobs was 216. The number of jobs in the primary sector was 2, all of which were in agriculture. The number of jobs in the secondary sector was 22 of which 4 or (18.2%) were in manufacturing and 19 (86.4%) were in construction. The number of jobs in the tertiary sector was 192. In the tertiary sector; 7 or 3.6% were in wholesale or retail sales or the repair of motor vehicles, 7 or 3.6% were in a hotel or restaurant, 1 was in the information industry, 11 or 5.7% were technical professionals or scientists, 3 or 1.6% were in education and 144 or 75.0% were in health care.

In 2000, there were 188 workers who commuted into the municipality and 229 workers who commuted away. The municipality is a net exporter of workers, with about 1.2 workers leaving the municipality for every one entering. About 3.2% of the workforce coming into Chamblon are coming from outside Switzerland. Of the working population, 9.1% used public transportation to get to work, and 72.3% used a private car.

== Religion ==
From the 2000 census, 124 or 24.2% were Roman Catholic, while 269 or 52.4% belonged to the Swiss Reformed Church. Of the rest of the population, there were 2 members of an Orthodox church (or about 0.39% of the population), and there were 13 individuals (or about 2.53% of the population) who belonged to another Christian church. There was 1 individual who was Jewish, and 2 (or about 0.39% of the population) who were Islamic. There was 1 individual who belonged to another church. 80 (or about 15.59% of the population) belonged to no church, are agnostic or atheist, and 26 individuals (or about 5.07% of the population) did not answer the question.

== Education ==
In Chamblon about 205 or (40.0%) of the population have completed non-mandatory upper secondary education, and 69 or (13.5%) have completed additional higher education (either university or a Fachhochschule). Of the 69 who completed tertiary schooling, 65.2% were Swiss men, 23.2% were Swiss women.

In the 2009/2010 school year there were a total of 70 students in the Chamblon school district. In the Vaud cantonal school system, two years of non-obligatory preschool are provided by the political districts. During the school year, the political district provided preschool care for a total of 578 children of which 359 children (62.1%) received subsidized preschool care. The canton's primary school program requires students to attend for four years. There were 35 students in the municipal primary school program. The obligatory lower secondary school program lasts for six years and there were 35 students in those schools.

As of 2000, there were 40 students in Chamblon who came from another municipality, while 113 residents attended schools outside the municipality.
