= Treycovagnes =

- Municipality
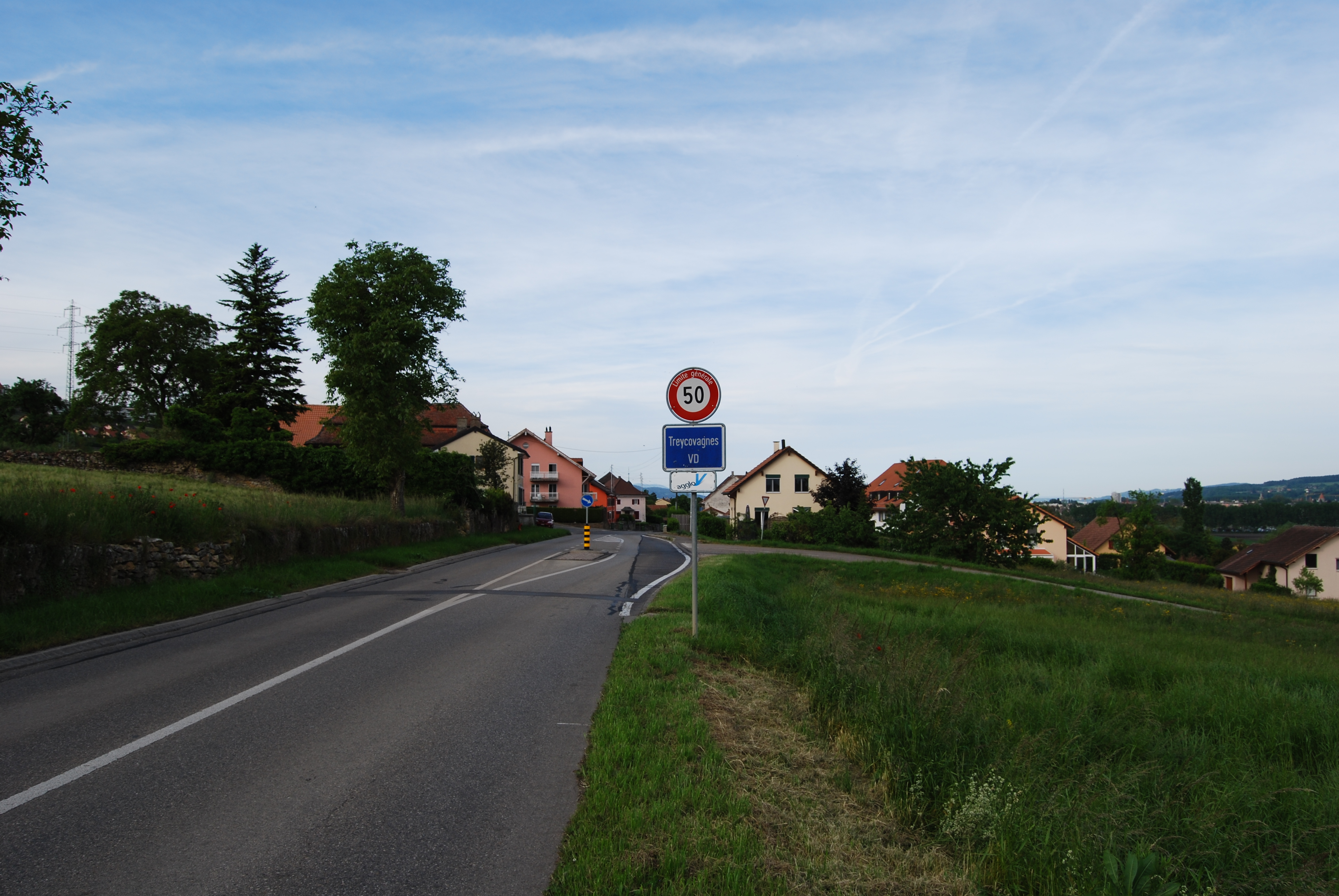

- Flag Coat of arms
- Location of Treycovagnes
- Location within Switzerland Location within Canton of Vaud
- Coordinates: 46°46′N 6°36′E
- Country: Switzerland
- Canton: Vaud
- District: Jura-Nord Vaudois

Government
  - Mayor: Syndic

Area
  - Total: 2.07 km^{2} (0.80 sq mi)
- Elevation: 457 m (1,499 ft)

Population (2003)
  - Total: 478
  - Density: 231/km^{2} (598/sq mi)
- Time zone: UTC+01:00 (CET)
  - Summer (DST): UTC+02:00 (CEST)
- Postal code: 1436
- SFOS number: 5931
- ISO 3166 code: CH-VD
- Surrounded by: Chamblon, Épendes, Montagny-près-Yverdon, Suscévaz, Yverdon-les-Bains
- Website: http://treycovagnes.ch/ Profile (in French), SFSO statistics

Treycovagnes is a municipality in the district of Jura-Nord Vaudois of the canton of Vaud in Switzerland.

== History ==
Treycovagnes is first mentioned in 1228 as Trescovanes.

== Geography ==
Treycovagnes has an area, as of 2009, of 2.1 square kilometers (0.81 mi^{2}). Of this area, 1.71 km^{2} (0.66 mi^{2}) or 82.2% is used for agricultural purposes, while 0.05 km^{2} (0.019 mi^{2}) or 2.4% is forested. Of the rest of the land, 0.28 km^{2} (0.11 mi^{2}) or 13.5% is settled (buildings or roads), 0.01 km^{2} (2.5 acres) or 0.5% is either rivers or lakes.

Of the built up area, housing and buildings made up 5.3% and transportation infrastructure made up 5.8%. Power and water infrastructure as well as other special developed areas made up 1.4% of the area Out of the forested land, 0.0% of the total land area is heavily forested and 2.4% is covered with orchards or small clusters of trees. Of the agricultural land, 76.4% is used for growing crops and 2.9% is pastures, while 2.9% is used for orchards or vine crops. All the water in the municipality is flowing water.

The municipality was part of the Yverdon District until it was dissolved on 31 August 2006, and Treycovagnes became part of the new district of Jura-Nord Vaudois.

The municipality is located on the Yverdon-les-Bains and Orbe road. It consists of the linear village of Treycovagnes and the hamlets of Châtelard and Uttins.

== Coat of arms ==
The blazon of the municipal coat of arms is Or, three Pine-trees bendwise sinister eradicated Vert, overall on a Bend Gules three Escallops of the first bendwise.

== Demographics ==
Treycovagnes has a population (as of December 2020) of 485. As of 2008, 8.7% of the population are resident foreign nationals. Over the last 10 years (1999–2009) the population has changed at a rate of 1.3%. It has changed at a rate of -5% due to migration and at a rate of 7.4% due to births and deaths. Most of the population (as of 2000) speaks French (429 or 93.7%) as their first language, with German being second most common (13 or 2.8%) and Italian being third (7 or 1.5%).

The age distribution, as of 2009, in Treycovagnes is; 86 children or 18.5% of the population are between 0 and 9 years old and 105 teenagers or 22.5% are between 10 and 19. Of the adult population, 43 people or 9.2% of the population are between 20 and 29 years old. 45 people or 9.7% are between 30 and 39, 69 people or 14.8% are between 40 and 49, and 56 people or 12.0% are between 50 and 59. The senior population distribution is 29 people or 6.2% of the population are between 60 and 69 years old, 24 people or 5.2% are between 70 and 79, there are 9 people or 1.9% who are between 80 and 89. As of 2000, there were 201 people who were single and never married in the municipality. There were 223 married individuals, 11 widows or widowers and 23 individuals who are divorced.

As of 2000, there were 163 private households in the municipality, and an average of 2.8 persons per household. There were 33 households that consist of only one person and 12 households with five or more people. Out of a total of 167 households that answered this question, 19.8% were households made up of just one person. Of the rest of the households, there are 38 married couples without children, 79 married couples with children There were 11 single parents with a child or children. There were 2 households that were made up of unrelated people and 4 households that were made up of some sort of institution or another collective housing.

In 2000 there were 75 single family homes (or 68.8% of the total) out of a total of 109 inhabited buildings. There were 13 multi-family buildings (11.9%), along with 15 multi-purpose buildings that were mostly used for housing (13.8%) and 6 other use buildings (commercial or industrial) that also had some housing (5.5%).

In 2000, a total of 158 apartments (90.3% of the total) were permanently occupied, while 12 apartments (6.9%) were seasonally occupied and 5 apartments (2.9%) were empty. As of 2009, the construction rate of new housing units was 2.1 new units per 1000 residents. The vacancy rate for the municipality, in 2010, was 0%.

The historical population is given in the following chart:

== Politics ==
In the 2007 federal election the most popular party was the SVP which received 27.4% of the vote. The next three most popular parties were the SP (27.03%), the FDP (14.66%) and the Green Party (10.44%). In the federal election, a total of 149 votes were cast, and the voter turnout was 45.3%.

== Economy ==
As of 2010, Treycovagnes had an unemployment rate of 3.4%. As of 2008, there were 7 people employed in the primary economic sector and about 3 businesses involved in this sector. 69 people were employed in the secondary sector and there were 9 businesses in this sector. 24 people were employed in the tertiary sector, with 11 businesses in this sector. There were 236 residents of the municipality who were employed in some capacity, of which females made up 40.7% of the workforce.

In 2008 the total number of full-time equivalent jobs was 88. The number of jobs in the primary sector was 5, all of which were in agriculture. The number of jobs in the secondary sector was 65 of which 30 or (46.2%) were in manufacturing and 36 (55.4%) were in construction. The number of jobs in the tertiary sector was 18. In the tertiary sector; 8 or 44.4% were in wholesale or retail sales or the repair of motor vehicles, 1 was in a hotel or restaurant, 5 or 27.8% were in the information industry, 4 or 22.2% were in education.

In 2000, there were 41 workers who commuted into the municipality and 198 workers who commuted away. The municipality is a net exporter of workers, with about 4.8 workers leaving the municipality for every one entering. Of the working population, 13.1% used public transportation to get to work, and 68.2% used a private car.

== Religion ==
From the 2000 census, 137 or 29.9% were Roman Catholic, while 218 or 47.6% belonged to the Swiss Reformed Church. Of the rest of the population, there were 25 individuals (or about 5.46% of the population) who belonged to another Christian church. There was 1 individual who was Jewish, and 5 (or about 1.09% of the population) who were Islamic. 81 (or about 17.69% of the population) belonged to no church, are agnostic or atheist, and 2 individuals (or about 0.44% of the population) did not answer the question.

== Education ==
In Treycovagnes about 184 or (40.2%) of the population have completed non-mandatory upper secondary education, and 57 or (12.4%) have completed additional higher education (either university or a Fachhochschule). Of the 57 who completed tertiary schooling, 57.9% were Swiss men, 22.8% were Swiss women, 8.8% were non-Swiss men and 10.5% were non-Swiss women.

In the 2009/2010 school year there were a total of 67 students in the Treycovagnes school district. In the Vaud cantonal school system, two years of non-obligatory pre-school are provided by the political districts. During the school year, the political district provided pre-school care for a total of 578 children of which 359 children (62.1%) received subsidized pre-school care. The canton's primary school program requires students to attend for four years. There were 33 students in the municipal primary school program. The obligatory lower secondary school program lasts for six years and there were 34 students in those schools.

As of 2000, there were 19 students in Treycovagnes who came from another municipality, while 81 residents attended schools outside the municipality.
