= Henney Kilowatt =

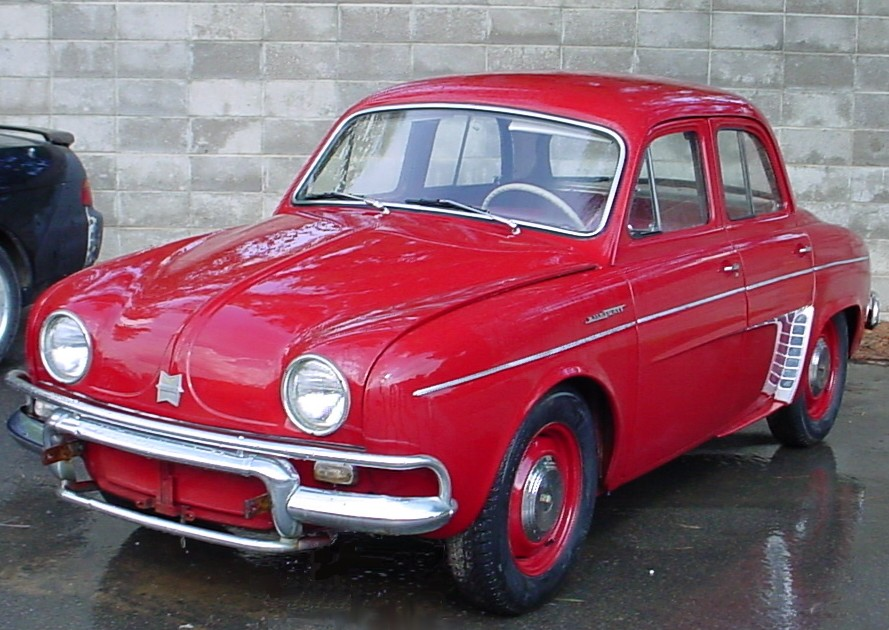

Overview
- Manufacturer: Henney Motor Company
- Production: 1959–1960
- Assembly: United States

Body and chassis
- Class: Supermini
- Layout: Rear engine, Rear-wheel drive
- Related: Renault Dauphine

Powertrain
- Electric motor: 5.2 kW (7.0 hp)
- Transmission: 3-speed Manual
- Range: 36V 1959; 64 km (40 miles); 72V 1960; 97–105 km (60–65 miles)

Dimensions
- Wheelbase: 2,261 mm (89.0 in)
- Length: 3,937 mm (155.0 in)
- Width: 1,668 mm (65.7 in)
- Height: 1,448 mm (57.0 in)
- Curb weight: 36V 1959; 907 kg (2,000 lb); 72V 1960; 968 kg (2,135 lb)

The Henney Kilowatt was an electric car introduced in the United States of America for the 1959 model year. The car used some body parts as made for the Renault Dauphine. An improved model was introduced in 1960 with a top speed of 60 miles an hour and a range of 60 miles. Only 47 cars were sold over the two model years, mostly to electrical utility companies. Only a few still exist.

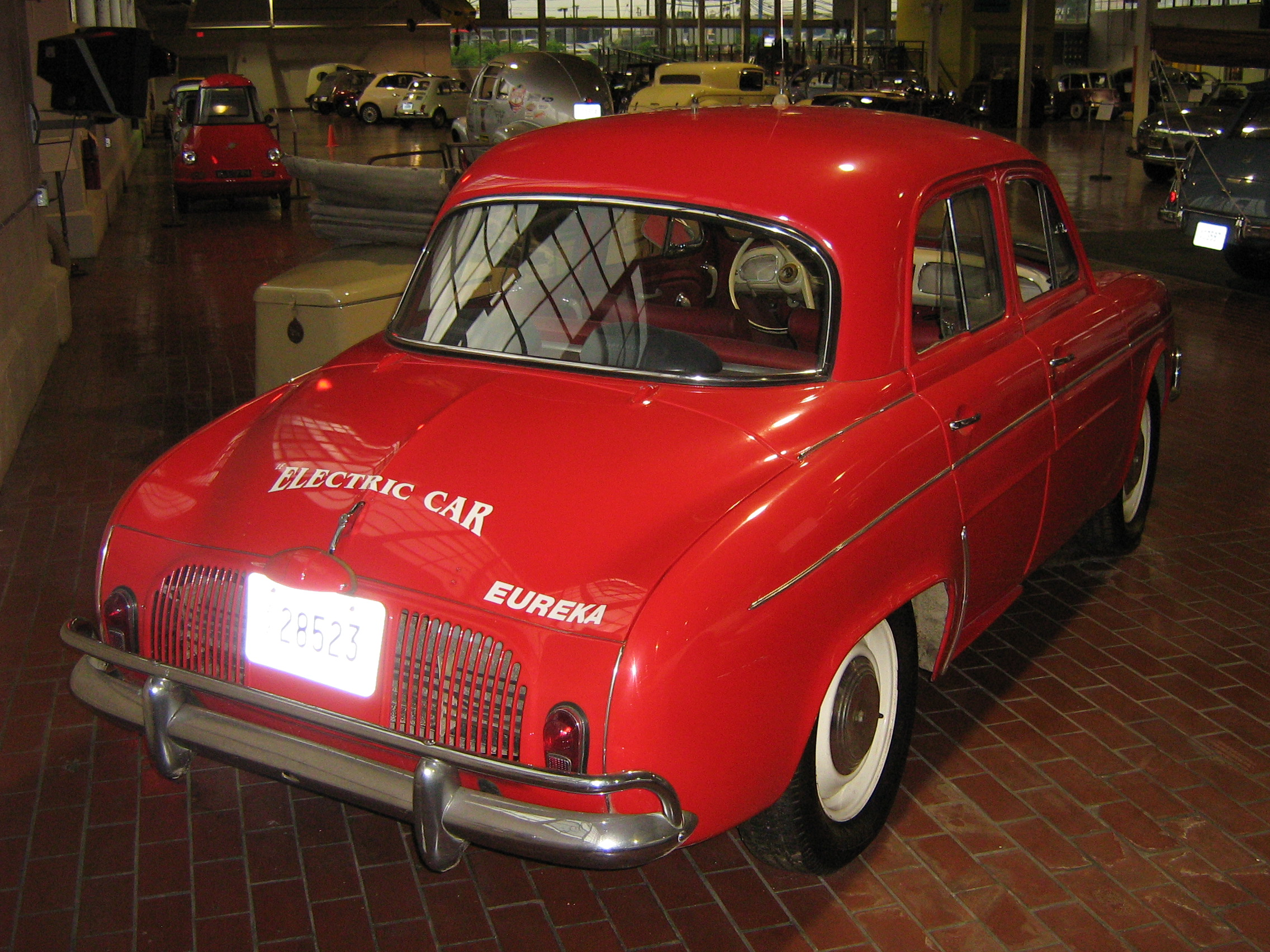
Rear view

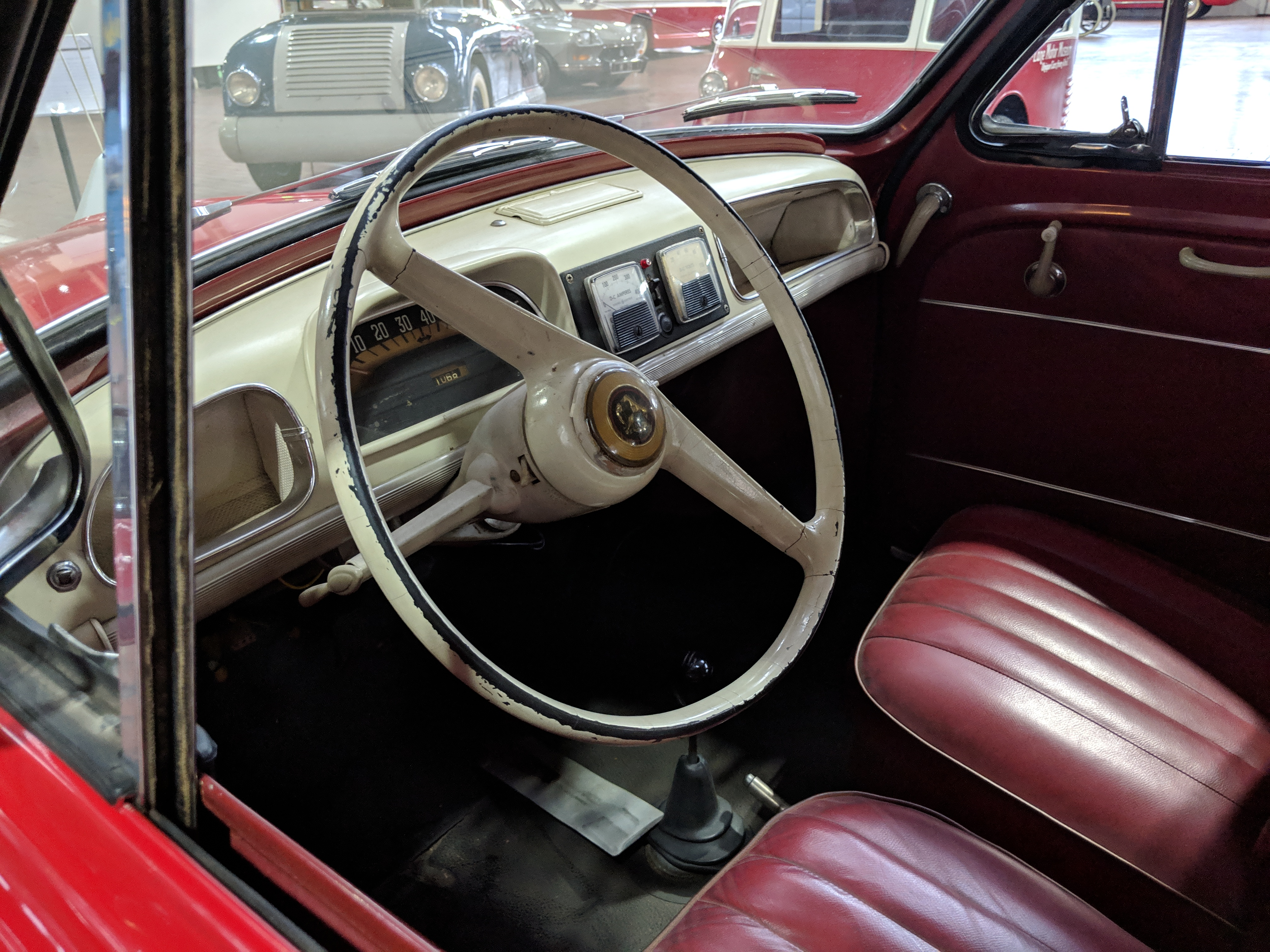
Interior featuring DC ampere gauge (left) and DC volt gauge (right)

== Funding ==
The Henney Kilowatt was a project of National Union Electric Company, a conglomerate including Emerson Radio, and Henney Motor Company, which had purchased Eureka Williams in 1953. The project was initiated by C. Russell Feldmann, president of National Union Electric Company and the Eureka Williams Company. To build the electric cars, he employed the services of the Henney Motor Company coachwork division of Canastota, New York.

Henney had been building custom coaches since 1868 and was a well-recognized name in the automotive industry because of its affiliation with the Packard Automobile Company and the Ford Motor Company. Henney produced thousands of custom built limousines, ambulances, and hearses (most of them built on Packard or Lincoln chassis), before being contracted to begin the Kilowatt project.

National Union Electric Company was also the producer of Exide Batteries—and naturally had a vested interest in shifting American automotive focus from fossil fuels to lead-cell batteries.

Morrison McMullan, Jr., controller of Exide Batteries, was also a participant in the development of the Kilowatt. (In 1974, National Union Electric was purchased by AB Electrolux of Sweden .)

== Designers and developers ==
The propulsion system was developed in consultation with Victor Wouk, then an electrical engineer at Caltech. Wouk is best known as one of the pioneers of hybrid electric cars.

Wouk recruited Lee DuBridge, then President of Caltech, and Linus Pauling to assist in the assessment and development of the electronics. Although Pauling never did any active work on the project, DuBridge convened a group of Caltech experts to provide input. Wouk designed the necessary speed controller for the Kilowatt, although the controller was manufactured for the Kilowatts by Curtis Instruments.

The electric propulsion system for the cars was designed and built by the Eureka Williams Company of Bloomington, Illinois, manufacturer of Eureka Vacuum Cleaners. Henney Coachworks was contracted to build the chassis of the car from tooling and parts purchased from Renault. Many body panels and interior components of the car are virtually identical to those of the Renault Dauphine.

== Performance and technology ==
The 1959 models all ran on a 36-volt system of 18 two-volt batteries in series. The 36-volt cars had a top speed of 40 miles per hour (64 km/h) and could run approximately 40 miles (64 km) on a full charge. After the 36-volt system was realized to be impractical, the Kilowatt drivetrain was redesigned by Eureka Williams as a 72-volt system for the 1960 model year. It employed 12 six-volt batteries in series. The 72-volt models were much more practical than the 1959 36-volt models. The 1960 Kilowatt boasted a top speed of nearly 60 mph (97 km/h) with a range of over 60 miles (97 km) on a single charge.

Although the Kilowatt is described by some sources as "the first transistor-based electric car", the speed controller uses a combination of relays and diodes to switch the batteries and motor windings in different configurations for different speeds, not transistors.

== Production and sales ==
According to the official Eureka Company corporate history profile there were a total of 100 Henney Kilowatts manufactured during the entire two year production run, but of those 100 cars only 47 were ever sold. A French Renault Dauphine enthusiast website also states that a total of 100 rolling chassis were prepared by Henney Coachworks for the project, but of those only 47 functional cars were completed. A March 20, 1967, article in U.S. News & World Report states that 35 of the Henney Kilowatts were purchased by electric utilities in the United States. Company records show that there were 24 cars sold to electric utilities as 36 volt 1959 models and eight Kilowatts sold to utility companies as 72 volt 1960 models.

Fewer than 15 Henney electric cars were sold to the general public. Some of these cars may have been sold as 1961 models. The company continued promoting the Kilowatt in 1961 with hopes of securing enough prepaid orders to finish the remaining chassis components that had already been built. Few, if any, were sold in this manner. Although the 72 volt propulsion system introduced for the 1960 model year was substantially superior to the earlier 36 volt systems, Eureka Williams was unable to produce the 72-volt system cheaply enough or quickly enough to attain the targeted $3600 sales price.

Of the documented 32 Henney Kilowatts produced, it is estimated that there are between four and eight still in existence. The very first two Henney Kilowatts – the serial number 0001 car and the original prototype (serial number "EXPERIMENTAL") were stored by company executives for decades until being sold to a private U.S. automobile collector in the early 2000s. These two cars both have fewer than 500 miles (about 800 kilometres) and are impeccable examples of this historical vehicle. Additionally, there are at least two other documented "survivors" that are still driven periodically.

== Significance ==
The Kilowatt has been called the world's first mass production electric car, although early in the 20th century electric vehicles were produced in much larger numbers (thousands per year) by companies such as Detroit Electric and Milburn. Although electric cars outsold gasoline cars in 1900, the introduction of the Kilowatt followed a very lengthy period in which they had been out of favor.
