= Hennies =

Hennies is a surname. Notable people with the surname include:

- Don Hennies (born 1937), American politician
- Sarah Hennies (born 1979), American composer and percussionist
- Tom Hennies (1939–2009), American police officer and politician, brother of Don
