= Phil Henny =

Racing mechanic, driver, and author

Phil Louis Henny (born 31 January 1943, Montagny-près-Yverdon, Switzerland) is a racing mechanic, driver, and author.

== Career ==
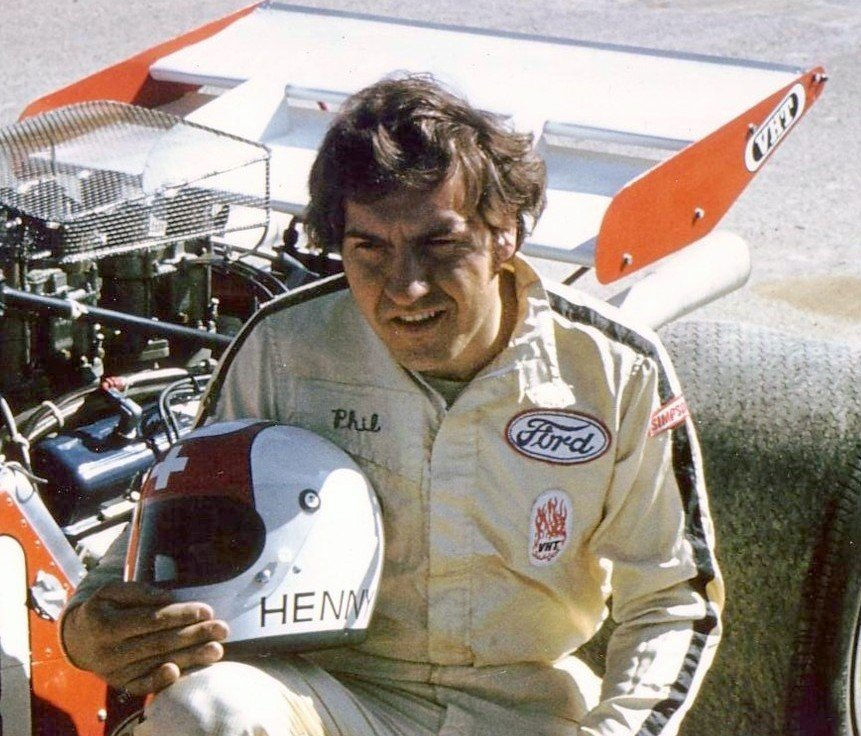
Riverside California in 1971

In 1964, Henny modified a Jaguar E for Swiss driver Maurice Caillet, competing in the FIA Endurance races. In 1965, he toured Europe Formula 2 Championship with French driver Bernard Collomb. In 1966, he worked for the Scuderia Filipinetti as a crew chief on the Ford GT40 driven by Peter Sutclife and Dieter Spoerry at the 24 Hours of Le Mans. In 1967, he joined Carroll Shelby racing team and was one of the mechanic participating in the construction of the Ford MK IV, that won Le Mans in 1967, driven by Dan Gurney and A. J. Foyt.

From 1969 until 1976, Henny participated in 19 races with SCCA and IMSA. Driving sports cars, Formula 5000, and GT cars. He raced in the Daytona 24 Hours in 1976. In 1973, Henny founded Drysumpsystems Inc. manufacturing oiling systems adaptable to race cars such as NASCAR, CanAm, TransAm and Formula 5000.

In 2004, Henny released his first book relating his story while working in the sixties at Shelby American.

== Published works ==
- Just call me Carroll (2004, Editions Cotty; ISBN 0-9765247-1-6)
- Appelle moi Carroll (2005, Editions du Palmier; ISBN 2-914920-49-0)
- Appelle moi Carroll (2013, Editions Cotty; ISBN 978-0-9765247-7-9)
- Bob Bondurant America's uncrowned World Driving Champion (2007, Editions Cotty; ISBN 0-9765247-0-8)
- Bob Bondurant Des Cobra à la Formule1 la meme passion (2008, Editions Cotty; ISBN 978-0-9765247-3-1)
- Nenn mich einfach Carroll (2009, Editions Cotty; ISBN 978-0-9765247-4-8)
- Al Bartz Engine Man (2011, Editions Cotty; ISBN 978-0-9765247-6-2)
- Build your own Cobra (2013, Editions Cotty; ISBN 978-0-9765247-8-6)
- Dave MacDonald – Cobra Man (2018 The will to Win Editions) Cotty.
- Dan Gurney – Nostalgie (2019 English Editions) Cotty. ISBN 978-0692130025
