= Henney Motor Company =

Defunct American motor vehicle body manufacturer

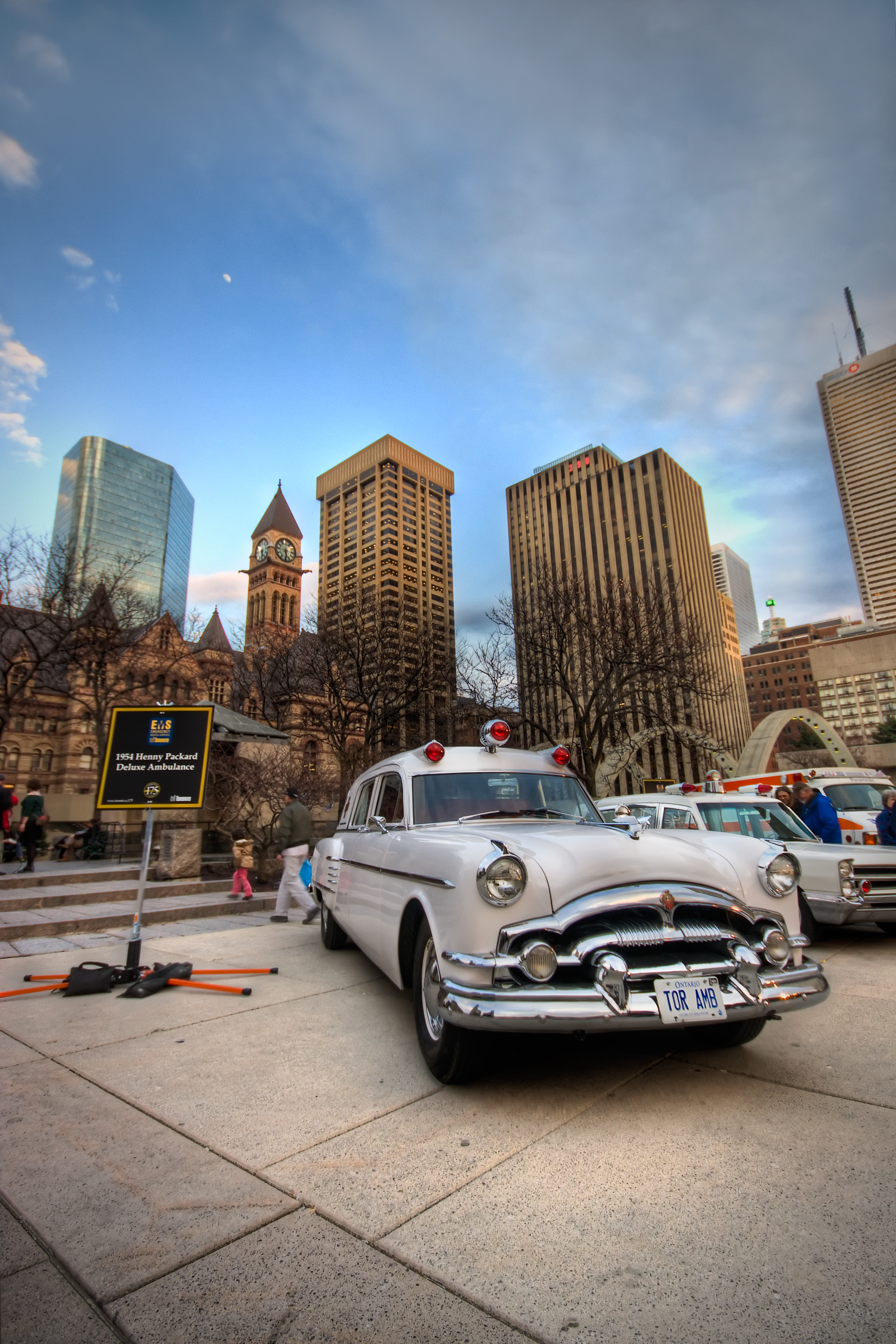
1954 Henney Packard Deluxe Ambulance on display in Nathan Philip Square during Toronto's 175th Anniversary celebration .

Henney Motor Company was an American manufacturer of limousine, hearse, ambulance, and taxicab bodies in Freeport, Illinois from 1927 to 1954. Some operations were moved to Canastota, New York to make an electric car, the Henney Kilowatt but the factory closed when partner National Union Electric Corp found it impossible to manufacture the batteries for the planned price.
