= Transports publics de la région nyonnaise =

- Industry: Public transport
- Founded: January 1, 1977; 48 years ago
- Headquarters: Rue de la Gare 45; CH-1260 Nyon, Switzerland
- Number of employees: 104 (2023)
- Website: www.bustpn.ch

The Transports publics de la région nyonnaise (TPN) is a Swiss public transport company serving Nyon and the surrounding area, as well as the La Côte region. The company has been linked to the Nyon-Saint-Cergue-Morez railway since 1996.

TPN operates a network of ten routes, including three urban routes serving Nyon and Prangins and seven regional routes.

== History ==
Public bus transport was introduced in Nyon in 1962 when the Nyon–Crassier–Divonne railway line was replaced by a bus service. This service was extended to La Rippe and included stops in Bogis-Bossey and Chavannes-de-Bogis, operated by Louis SA.

On 1 January 1977, Transports publics de la région nyonnaise (TPN) was established and assumed the operations of Louis SA, including the aforementioned bus routes.

On 1 June 1993, the service was extended to Arnex-sur-Nyon and the Chavannes-de-Bogis shopping centre.

In 1996, TPN was acquired by Chemin de fer Nyon–Saint-Cergue–Morez (NStCM), leading to the establishment of a joint management structure between the two companies, as well as with TéléDôle and Télécabine de Saint-Cergue. Two years later, on 24 May 1998, TPN received a concession for four new routes:

- Nyon–Crassier–La Rippe–Divonne-les-Bains
- Crassier–Chavannes-de-Bogis–Divonne-les-Bains
- Chavannes-de-Bogis–Centre commercial
- Chavannes-de-Bogis–Châtaigneriaz–Commugny–Coppet

The existing route was also extended to Coppet via Châtaigneriaz and Commugny.

On 1 January 1999, TPN took over the urban bus service between Nyon and Prangins. On 15 December 2002, it also assumed operation of the entire Nyon–Gingins route.

On 12 December 2004, TPN introduced two new regional routes and joined the Unireso fare network of Geneva:

- Nyon–Céligny–Coppet
- Nyon–Prangins–Gland

In December 2010, TPN integrated into the Mobilis Vaud fare network, necessitating the renumbering of routes to prevent duplication within the network.

In December 2014, a traffic light priority system was introduced in Nyon. However, implementation errors led to significant traffic congestion, requiring the removal of certain traffic lights to restore flow at key junctions. This system was part of a broader reorganization of the urban network, structured around five core lines operating in a hub-and-spoke pattern. It also introduced quarter-hourly services on weekdays from 06:00 to 20:00, with reduced frequencies in the evenings and on weekends. Additionally, a new corporate identity was introduced, shared with NStCM.

In 2015, TPN acquired the depot of the Société d'auto-transports du pied du Jura vaudois (SAPJV) in Gland. The company had been leasing the facility until purchasing it due to SAPJV’s financial difficulties.

On 15 December 2019, operation of the 814 route, TPN’s only subcontracted cross-border service, was transferred to ALSA Bustours Gex (ABG), a subsidiary of ALSA-Odier. At the same time, ABG introduced a new cross-border route, the 818 service, between Gex and Nyon. The operation of these two lines returned to TPN on 10 December 2023, while line 804 absorbed line 801 and line 802 disappeared in favour of lines 803, which will now bypass the city centre to the east, and 804.

== Lines ==
Line	Route
803	Nyon Petite Prairie – Gare – Colovray
804	Nyon Chantemerle – La Levratte – Gare – Terre-Bonne
805	Nyon gare – Prangins Les Abériaux
810	Nyon gare – Crassier – La Rippe village
811	Coppet gare – Nyon gare sud – Gland gare nord
813	Coppet gare – Chavannes-des-Bois
814	Coppet gare – Divonne-les-Bains
815	Nyon gare – Gingins poste
818	Nyon – Divonne-les-Bains – Gex
891	Coppet gare – Founex

== Fleet ==
The network's fleet consists mainly of MAN Lion's City and Mercedes-Benz Citaro buses. Most of the fleet was renewed between 2014 and 2015.

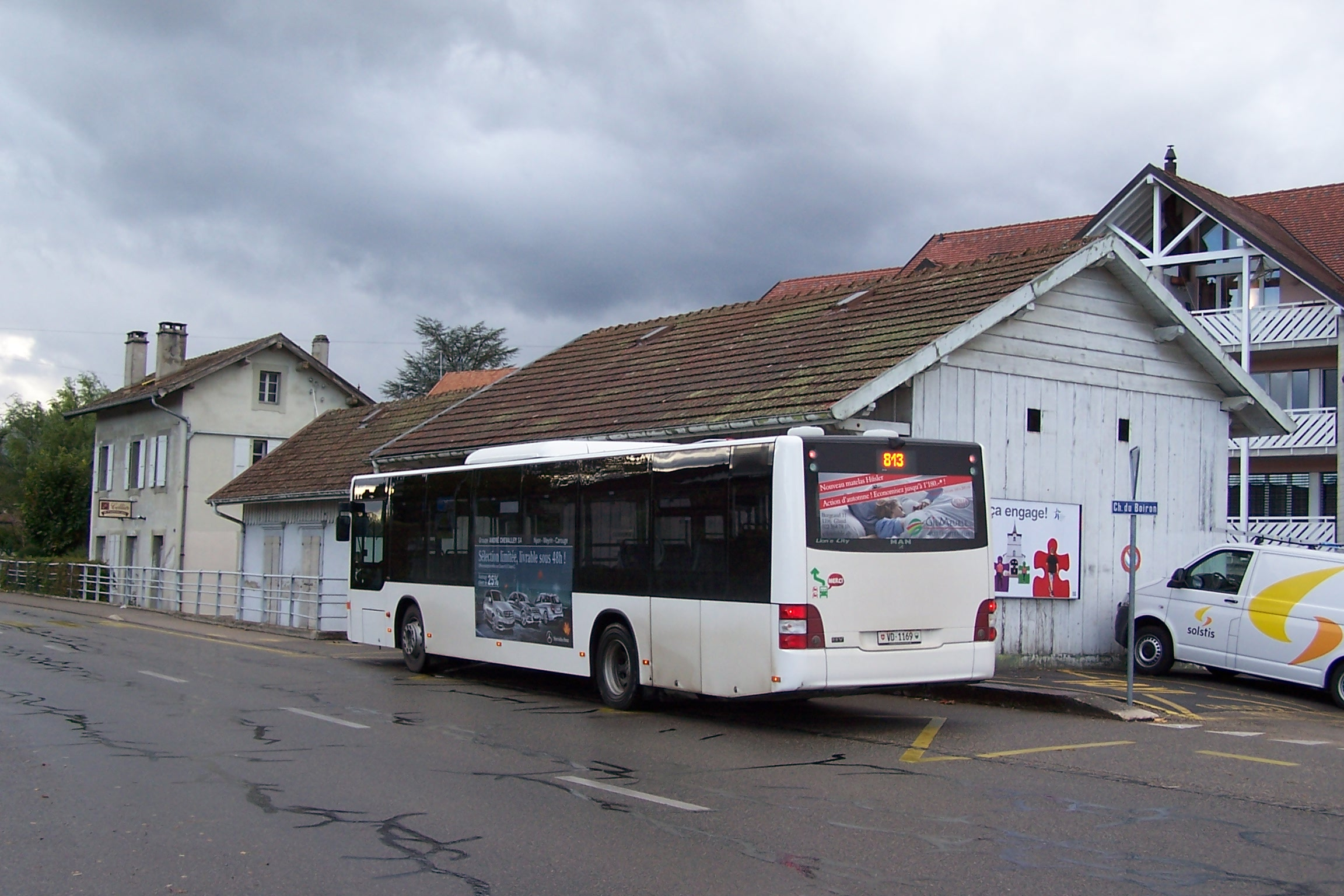
MAN Lion's City

2018 saw the purchase of two Mercedes-Benz Citaro G articulated buses to cope with the increase in ridership on the network.

As part of its commitment to protecting the environment, TPN has already introduced five hybrid buses since 2020.
