= Crans-près-Céligny =

Crans
- Municipality
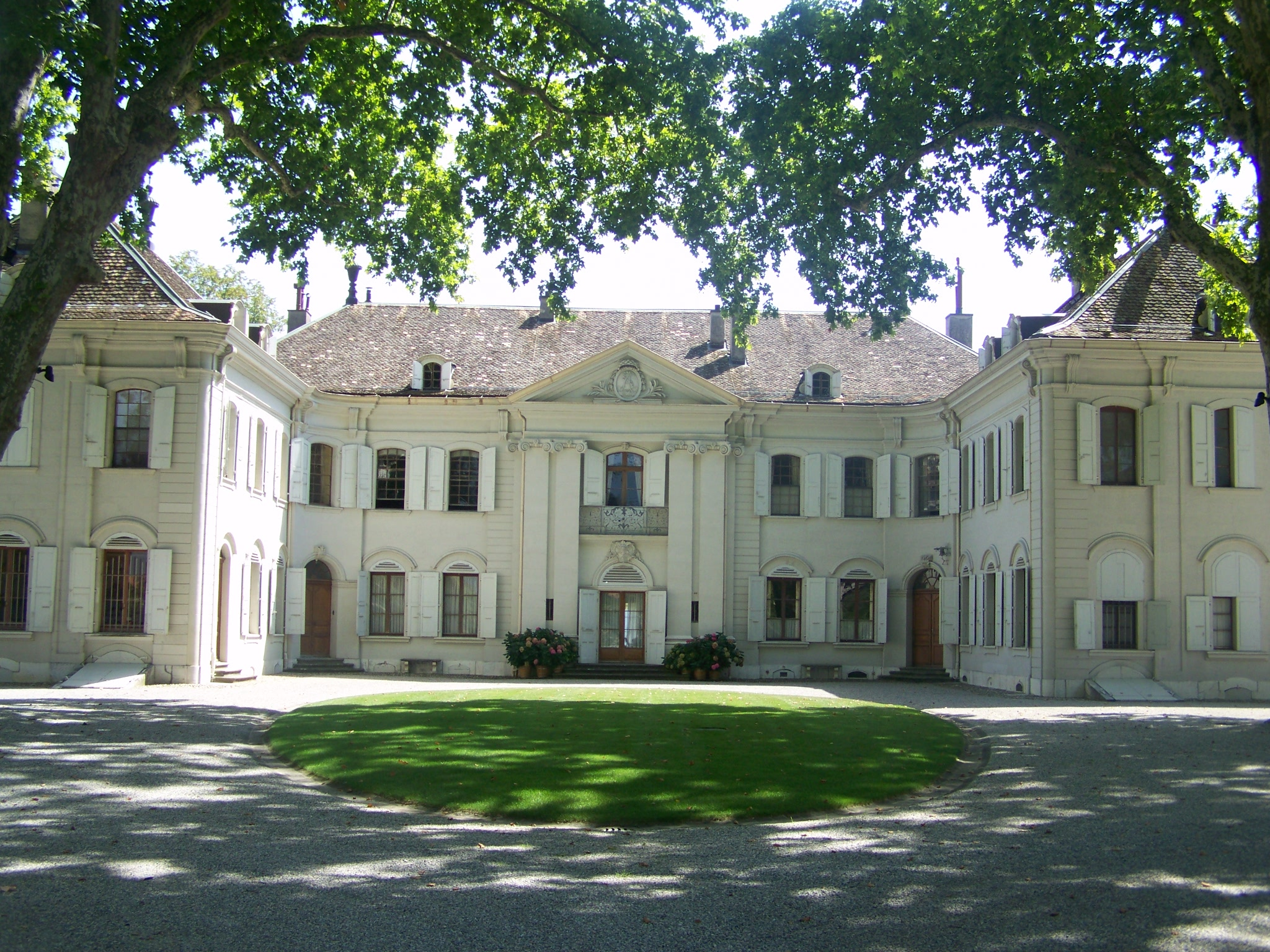

- Flag Coat of arms
- Location of Crans
- Location within Switzerland Location within Canton of Vaud
- Coordinates: 46°21′N 6°12′E
- Country: Switzerland
- Canton: Vaud
- District: Nyon

Government
  - Mayor: Syndic

Area
  - Total: 4.29 km^{2} (1.66 sq mi)
- Elevation: 423 m (1,388 ft)

Population (2021)
  - Total: 2,360
  - Density: 550/km^{2} (1,420/sq mi)
- Demonym: Les Corbeaux / Les Corbelles
- Time zone: UTC+01:00 (CET)
  - Summer (DST): UTC+02:00 (CEST)
- Postal code: 1299
- SFOS number: 5713
- ISO 3166 code: CH-VD
- Surrounded by: Arnex-sur-Nyon, Céligny (GE), Crassier, Eysins, Nyon
- Website: www.cransvd.ch

Crans (until 2021 Crans-près-Céligny French for Crans near Céligny) is a municipality in the district of Nyon in the canton of Vaud in Switzerland.

== History ==
Aerial view from 100 m by Walter Mittelholzer (1925)

Crans-près-Céligny is first mentioned in 1008 as Cranos.

== Geography ==
Crans has an area, as of 2009, of 4.3 square kilometers (1.7 mi^{2}). Of this area, 2.46 km^{2} (0.95 mi^{2}) or 56.9% is used for agricultural purposes, while 0.63 km^{2} (0.24 mi^{2}) or 14.6% is forested. Of the rest of the land, 1.16 km^{2} (0.45 mi^{2}) or 26.9% is settled (buildings or roads), 0.02 km^{2} (4.9 acres) or 0.5% is either rivers or lakes.

Of the built up area, housing and buildings made up 19.0% and transportation infrastructure made up 6.0%. while parks, green belts and sports fields made up 1.4%. Out of the forested land, all of the forested land area is covered with heavy forests. Of the agricultural land, 48.4% is used for growing crops and 3.9% is pastures, while 4.6% is used for orchards or vine crops. Of the water in the municipality, 0.2% is in lakes and 0.2% is in rivers and streams.

The municipality was part of the Nyon District until it was dissolved on 31 August 2006, and Crans became part of the new district of Nyon.

The municipality is located west of Nyon across Lake Geneva. It is located near Céligny, a municipality in Geneva.

== Coat of arms ==
The blazon of the municipal coat of arms is Gules, a Church Cross Argent.

== Demographics ==
Crans has a population (as of December 2020) of 2,336. As of 2008, 29.8% of the population are resident foreign nationals. Over the last ten years (1999–2009 ) the population has changed at a rate of 4.2%. It has changed at a rate of -1.4% due to migration and at a rate of 5.5% due to births and deaths.

Most of the population (as of 2000) speaks French (1,474 or 75.1%), with English being second most common (207 or 10.5%) and German being third (143 or 7.3%). There are 25 people who speak Italian and two people who speak Romansh.

The age distribution, as of 2009, in Crans is; 248 children or 12.8% of the population are between 0 and 9 years old and 267 teenagers or 13.8% are between 10 and 19. Of the adult population, 131 people or 6.8% of the population are between 20 and 29 years old. 232 people or 12.0% are between 30 and 39, 372 people or 19.3% are between 40 and 49, and 235 people or 12.2% are between 50 and 59. The senior population distribution is 265 people or 13.7% of the population are between 60 and 69 years old, 133 people or 6.9% are between 70 and 79, there are 38 people or 2.0% who are between 80 and 89, and there are 9 people or 0.5% who are 90 and older.

As of 2000, there were 769 people who were single and never married in the municipality. There were 1,037 married individuals, 64 widows or widowers and 93 individuals who are divorced.

As of 2000, there were 689 private households in the municipality, and an average of 2.7 persons per household. There were 119 households that consist of only one person and 55 households with five or more people. Out of a total of 722 households that answered this question, 16.5% were households made up of just one person and there were 6 adults who lived with their parents. Of the rest of the households, there are 205 married couples without children, 299 married couples with children There were 50 single parents with a child or children. There were 10 households that were made up of unrelated people and 33 households that were made up of some sort of institution or another collective housing.

In 2000 there were 436 single family homes (or 77.6% of the total) out of a total of 562 inhabited buildings. There were 69 multi-family buildings (12.3%), along with 40 multi-purpose buildings that were mostly used for housing (7.1%) and 17 other use buildings (commercial or industrial) that also had some housing (3.0%).

In 2000, a total of 658 apartments (88.3% of the total) were permanently occupied, while 76 apartments (10.2%) were seasonally occupied and 11 apartments (1.5%) were empty. As of 2009, the construction rate of new housing units was 3.9 new units per 1000 residents. The vacancy rate for the municipality, in 2010, was 0%.

The historical population is given in the following chart:

== Heritage sites of national significance ==
Crans Castle is listed as a Swiss heritage site of national significance.

== Events ==
It is the home of the Caribana Festival, held every year in June since 1991. In 2006, around 20,000 people attended.

== Politics ==
In the 2007 federal election the most popular party was the SVP which received 23.63% of the vote. The next three most popular parties were the LPS Party (20.17%), the FDP (16.6%) and the Green Party (13.31%). In the federal election, a total of 525 votes were cast, and the voter turnout was 49.0%.

== Economy ==
As of 2010, Crans had an unemployment rate of 2.4%. As of 2008, there were 18 people employed in the primary economic sector and about 7 businesses involved in this sector. 30 people were employed in the secondary sector and there were 10 businesses in this sector. 284 people were employed in the tertiary sector, with 56 businesses in this sector. There were 961 residents of the municipality who were employed in some capacity, of which females made up 41.6% of the workforce.

In 2008 the total number of full-time equivalent jobs was 227. The number of jobs in the primary sector was 13, of which 12 were in agriculture and 1 was in fishing or fisheries. The number of jobs in the secondary sector was 27 of which 15 or (55.6%) were in manufacturing and 12 (44.4%) were in construction. The number of jobs in the tertiary sector was 187. In the tertiary sector; 48 or 25.7% were in wholesale or retail sales or the repair of motor vehicles, 10 or 5.3% were in the movement and storage of goods, 11 or 5.9% were in a hotel or restaurant, 7 or 3.7% were in the information industry, 4 or 2.1% were the insurance or financial industry, 19 or 10.2% were technical professionals or scientists, 12 or 6.4% were in education and 26 or 13.9% were in health care.

In 2000, there were 165 workers who commuted into the municipality and 787 workers who commuted away. The municipality is a net exporter of workers, with about 4.8 workers leaving the municipality for every one entering. About 12.7% of the workforce coming into Crans-près-Céligny are coming from outside Switzerland, while 0.1% of the locals commute out of Switzerland for work. Of the working population, 12.1% used public transportation to get to work, and 73.9% used a private car.

== Religion ==
From the 2000 census, 630 or 32.1% were Roman Catholic, while 659 or 33.6% belonged to the Swiss Reformed Church. Of the rest of the population, there were 32 members of an Orthodox church (or about 1.63% of the population), there were 2 individuals (or about 0.10% of the population) who belonged to the Christian Catholic Church, and there were 71 individuals (or about 3.62% of the population) who belonged to another Christian church. There were 10 individuals (or about 0.51% of the population) who were Jewish, and 35 (or about 1.78% of the population) who were Islamic. There were 6 individuals who were Buddhist, 2 individuals who were Hindu and 3 individuals who belonged to another church. 392 (or about 19.97% of the population) belonged to no church, are agnostic or atheist, and 137 individuals (or about 6.98% of the population) did not answer the question.

== Education ==
In Crans about 587 or (29.9%) of the population have completed non-mandatory upper secondary education, and 606 or (30.9%) have completed additional higher education (either university or a Fachhochschule). Of the 606 who completed tertiary schooling, 42.7% were Swiss men, 24.1% were Swiss women, 17.5% were non-Swiss men and 15.7% were non-Swiss women.

In the 2009/2010 school year there were a total of 237 students in the Crans school district. In the Vaud cantonal school system, two years of non-obligatory pre-school are provided by the political districts. During the school year, the political district provided pre-school care for a total of 1,249 children of which 563 children (45.1%) received subsidized pre-school care. The canton's primary school program requires students to attend for four years. There were 137 students in the municipal primary school program. The obligatory lower secondary school program lasts for six years and there were 95 students in those schools. There were also 5 students who were home schooled or attended another non-traditional school.

As of 2000, there were 21 students in Crans who came from another municipality, while 281 residents attended schools outside the municipality.
