= Crassier =

- Municipality
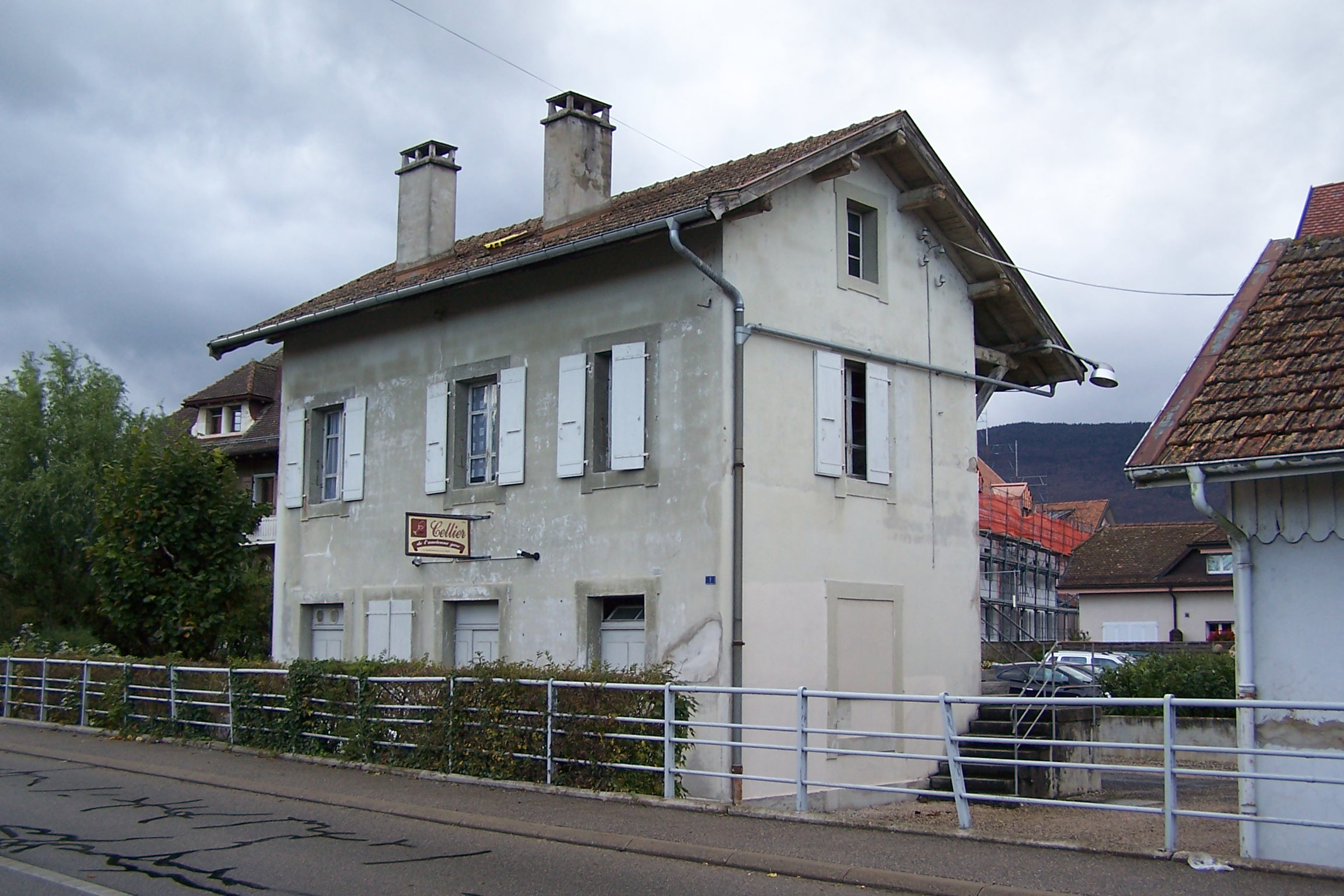

- Flag Coat of arms
- Location of Crassier
- Location within Switzerland Location within Canton of Vaud
- Coordinates: 46°22′N 6°10′E
- Country: Switzerland
- Canton: Vaud
- District: Nyon

Government
  - Mayor: Syndic

Area
  - Total: 2.03 km^{2} (0.78 sq mi)
- Elevation: 475 m (1,558 ft)

Population (2005)
  - Total: 1,026
  - Density: 505/km^{2} (1,310/sq mi)
- Time zone: UTC+01:00 (CET)
  - Summer (DST): UTC+02:00 (CEST)
- Postal code: 1263
- SFOS number: 5714
- ISO 3166 code: CH-VD
- Surrounded by: Arnex-sur-Nyon, Bogis-Bossey, Borex, Céligny (GE), Chéserex, Crans-près-Céligny, Divonne-les-Bains (FR-01), La Rippe
- Website: www.crassier.ch

Crassier is a municipality in the district of Nyon in the canton of Vaud in Switzerland.

== History ==
Crassier is first mentioned in 1123 as de Craceio.

== Geography ==
Crassier has an area, as of 2009, of 2 square kilometers (0.77 mi^{2}). Of this area, 1.39 km^{2} (0.54 mi^{2}) or 68.5% is used for agricultural purposes, while 0.22 km^{2} (0.085 mi^{2}) or 10.8% is forested. Of the rest of the land, 0.43 km^{2} (0.17 mi^{2}) or 21.2% is settled (buildings or roads).

Of the built up area, industrial buildings made up 2.0% of the total area while housing and buildings made up 12.8% and transportation infrastructure made up 4.4%. Power and water infrastructure as well as other special developed areas made up 1.5% of the area Out of the forested land, 8.9% of the total land area is heavily forested and 2.0% is covered with orchards or small clusters of trees. Of the agricultural land, 62.6% is used for growing crops, while 4.9% is used for orchards or vine crops.

The municipality was part of the Nyon District until it was dissolved on 31 August 2006, and Crassier became part of the new district of Nyon.

The municipality is located near the French border on the Nyon-Divonne road.

== Coat of arms ==
The blazon of the municipal coat of arms is Gules, a Bar wavy Argent, overall two Keys saltirewise Or, in base a Coupeaux of the last.

== Demographics ==
Crassier has a population (as of December 2020) of 1,172. As of 2008, 27.2% of the population are resident foreign nationals. Over the last 10 years (1999–2009) the population has changed at a rate of 50.9%. It has changed at a rate of 39.3% due to migration and at a rate of 13.7% due to births and deaths.

Most of the population (as of 2000) speaks French (599 or 77.9%), with German being second most common (57 or 7.4%) and English being third (54 or 7.0%). There are 14 people who speak Italian.

The age distribution, as of 2009, in Crassier is; 168 children or 16.4% of the population are between 0 and 9 years old and 144 teenagers or 14.0% are between 10 and 19. Of the adult population, 70 people or 6.8% of the population are between 20 and 29 years old. 163 people or 15.9% are between 30 and 39, 203 people or 19.8% are between 40 and 49, and 106 people or 10.3% are between 50 and 59. The senior population distribution is 114 people or 11.1% of the population are between 60 and 69 years old, 45 people or 4.4% are between 70 and 79, there are 11 people or 1.1% who are between 80 and 89, and there are 3 people or 0.3% who are 90 and older.

As of 2000, there were 327 people who were single and never married in the municipality. There were 386 married individuals, 24 widows or widowers and 32 individuals who are divorced.

As of 2000, there were 295 private households in the municipality, and an average of 2.5 persons per household. There were 83 households that consist of only one person and 21 households with five or more people. Out of a total of 301 households that answered this question, 27.6% were households made up of just one person and there were 2 adults who lived with their parents. Of the rest of the households, there are 76 married couples without children, 118 married couples with children There were 8 single parents with a child or children. There were 8 households that were made up of unrelated people and 6 households that were made up of some sort of institution or another collective housing.

In 2000 there were 126 single family homes (or 69.2% of the total) out of a total of 182 inhabited buildings. There were 26 multi-family buildings (14.3%), along with 16 multi-purpose buildings that were mostly used for housing (8.8%) and 14 other use buildings (commercial or industrial) that also had some housing (7.7%).

In 2000, a total of 262 apartments (92.6% of the total) were permanently occupied, while 18 apartments (6.4%) were seasonally occupied and 3 apartments (1.1%) were empty. As of 2009, the construction rate of new housing units was 1.9 new units per 1000 residents. The vacancy rate for the municipality, in 2010, was 0%.

The historical population is given in the following chart:

== Politics ==
In the 2007 federal election the most popular party was the FDP which received 23.22% of the vote. The next three most popular parties were the SVP (21.96%), the SP (12.86%) and the LPS Party (9.88%). In the federal election, a total of 242 votes were cast, and the voter turnout was 43.6%.

== Economy ==
As of 2010, Crassier had an unemployment rate of 3.2%. As of 2008, there were 26 people employed in the primary economic sector and about 5 businesses involved in this sector. 103 people were employed in the secondary sector and there were 10 businesses in this sector. 146 people were employed in the tertiary sector, with 30 businesses in this sector. There were 398 residents of the municipality who were employed in some capacity, of which females made up 42.0% of the workforce.

In 2008 the total number of full-time equivalent jobs was 241. The number of jobs in the primary sector was 15, all of which were in agriculture. The number of jobs in the secondary sector was 97 of which 22 or (22.7%) were in manufacturing and 75 (77.3%) were in construction. The number of jobs in the tertiary sector was 129. In the tertiary sector; 61 or 47.3% were in wholesale or retail sales or the repair of motor vehicles, 30 or 23.3% were in the movement and storage of goods, 9 or 7.0% were in a hotel or restaurant, 1 was in the information industry, 6 or 4.7% were technical professionals or scientists, 11 or 8.5% were in education and 2 or 1.6% were in health care.

In 2000, there were 145 workers who commuted into the municipality and 328 workers who commuted away. The municipality is a net exporter of workers, with about 2.3 workers leaving the municipality for every one entering. About 17.9% of the workforce coming into Crassier are coming from outside Switzerland. Of the working population, 9.5% used public transportation to get to work, and 76.4% used a private car.

== Religion ==
From the 2000 census, 262 or 34.1% were Roman Catholic, while 268 or 34.9% belonged to the Swiss Reformed Church. Of the rest of the population, there were 5 members of an Orthodox church (or about 0.65% of the population), there were 2 individuals (or about 0.26% of the population) who belonged to the Christian Catholic Church, and there were 27 individuals (or about 3.51% of the population) who belonged to another Christian church. There were 13 (or about 1.69% of the population) who were Islamic. There was 1 person who was Buddhist and 1 person who was Hindu. 147 (or about 19.12% of the population) belonged to no church, are agnostic or atheist, and 55 individuals (or about 7.15% of the population) did not answer the question.

== Education ==
In Crassier about 267 or (34.7%) of the population have completed non-mandatory upper secondary education, and 165 or (21.5%) have completed additional higher education (either university or a Fachhochschule). Of the 165 who completed tertiary schooling, 41.2% were Swiss men, 19.4% were Swiss women, 24.8% were non-Swiss men and 14.5% were non-Swiss women.

In the 2009/2010 school year there were a total of 172 students in the Crassier school district. In the Vaud cantonal school system, two years of non-obligatory pre-school are provided by the political districts. During the school year, the political district provided pre-school care for a total of 1,249 children of which 563 children (45.1%) received subsidized pre-school care. The canton's primary school program requires students to attend for four years. There were 94 students in the municipal primary school program. The obligatory lower secondary school program lasts for six years and there were 78 students in those schools.

As of 2000, there were 145 students from Crassier who attended schools outside the municipality.

== Personalities ==
Suzanne Curchod, better known as Mme. Necker was the daughter of the pastor of Crassier. Her husband was a wealthy banker of Prussian origins, and her salon in Paris was famous before the French Revolution. Among the regular visitors were Jean-François Marmontel, Jean-François de La Harpe, Georges-Louis Leclerc, Comte de Buffon, Gabriel Bonnot de Mably, Bernardin de Saint-Pierre and the compilers of the Encyclopédie including Diderot and Jean le Rond d'Alembert.
