= Jean Lanfray =

French murderer (d. 1906)

Jean Lanfray (c. 1873– 26 February 1906) was a French labourer in Switzerland who was convicted of murdering his pregnant wife and two children in a drunken rage on the afternoon of 28 August 1905 in Commugny, Switzerland. It was later revealed by police that he had drunk an excessive amount of wine and hard liquors that morning, along with two ounces of absinthe. However, due to the moral panic against absinthe in Europe at that time, his murders were blamed solely on the influence of absinthe, leading to a petition to ban absinthe in Switzerland shortly after the murders. The petition received 82,000 signatures and absinthe was banned in Vaud shortly thereafter. A 1908 constitutional referendum led to absinthe being banned in all of Switzerland in 1910, and absinthe was banned in most European countries (and the United States) before the outbreak of World War I.

== Murders ==
During lunch on 28 August 1905, Lanfray consumed seven glasses of wine, six glasses of cognac, one coffee laced with brandy, two crème de menthes, and two glasses of absinthe after eating a sandwich. He returned home drunk with his father, and drank another coffee with brandy. He then got into an argument with his wife, and asked her to polish his shoes for him. When she refused, Lanfray retrieved a Vetterli rifle and shot her once in the head, killing her instantly, causing his father to flee. His four-year-old daughter, Rose, heard the noise and ran into the room, where Lanfray shot and killed her and his two-year-old daughter, Blanche. He then shot himself in the jaw and carried Blanche's body to the garden, where he collapsed.

Lanfray was discovered minutes later by police after they had been notified by his father. He eventually recovered in hospital and was put on trial for murder.

== Trial and death ==
The trial started on 23 February 1906 and ended that same day. It was argued by his attorneys that the two ounces of absinthe he consumed prior to the murders were solely to blame for his actions; Dr. Albert Mahaim, a leading Swiss psychologist, testified that Lanfray suffered from "a classic case of absinthe madness". However, the prosecutor, Alfred Obrist, argued that the two ounces of absinthe he had ingested were minor in relation to the large amounts of other alcoholic beverages he had consumed that day.

Lanfray was eventually found guilty on all three counts of murder and received thirty years' imprisonment. Three days after the trial, on 26 February 1906, Lanfray committed suicide by hanging in his prison cell.

== Public reaction ==
The Lanfray case received an astonishing amount of coverage, especially by Europe's temperance movement. It set off a moral panic against absinthe in Switzerland and other countries. A petition to ban absinthe in Switzerland received 82,000 signatures, and on 15 May 1906 the Vaud legislature voted to ban absinthe. Following pressure from cafe owners and absinthe manufacturers, a referendum to reverse this decision was launched, but failed 23,062 to 16,025. On 2 February 1907, the Grand Conseil voted to ban the retail sale of absinthe, including its imitations. Finally, on 5 July 1908, Article 32 to the Swiss Constitution was proposed, which would prohibit manufacturing or possession on absinthe in Switzerland. The article was added following a referendum, in which it won by 241,078 to 139,699 votes, and would be effective 7 October 1910. Eventually, similar incidents led to bans on absinthe in every European country (except the United Kingdom, Sweden and Spain) as well as the United States.
