= La Châtaigneraie (school) =

International School of Geneva at La Châtaigneraie
- Ecole International de Genève, Campus de La Châtaigneraie
- Logo of the International School of Geneva

Location
- 2, Ch de la Ferme; Founex, 1297; Switzerland
- 46.339783°N 6.171806°E

Information
- School type: International
- Founded: 1908
- Principals: Soraya Sayed Hassen (Campus & Secondary School); Jennifer Armstrong (Primary)
- Grades: 1 to 13
- Gender: Mixed
- Enrollment: 1170
- Education system: PYP, IGCSE, Brevet des collèges, IB Diploma, Maturité Fédéral
- Campus: La Chât (La Châtaigneraie)
- Campus size: 5.5 ha (13.6 Acres)
- Campus type: Countryside
- Houses: Jura, Alps, Lausanne, Vaud, Leman
- Colours: Green and Black
- Athletics: Football, basketball, golf, tennis, skiing, equestrian events, rugby, cross country, track and field,
- Mascot: Hawk
- Publication: Et Cetera (foundation-wide)
- Newspaper: La Gazette (weekly)
- Tuition: 24,000-36,000 per school year
- Alumni: Norman Schwarzkopf, Indira Gandhi,
- Nobel laureates: Edmond H. Fischer (as an Alumnus)
- Website: www.ecolint.ch

La Châtaigneraie (also called La Chât) is a private, international, coeducational day school. It is part of the Foundation of the International School of Geneva and offers a comprehensive education in English or French for students from age 4 to 18. Founded in 1908, La Châtaigneraie is located in Founex, Switzerland.

== History ==
=== École Nouvelle La Châtaigneraie ===
In 1908, Ernest Schwartz-Buys founded the Ecole Nouvelle du Léman, a coeducational school to be based upon German and English institutions. It opened its doors to girls and boys between 7 and 18 years of age, with a probable enrollment of six students in the 1908–09 school year.

=== Le Collège Protestant Romand (1954–71) ===
In the aftermath of the Second World War, between c. 1948–49, a group of pedagogues and pastors, led by the pastor Charles Bergier, decided that the Lake Geneva area needed a Protestant school. The official request for the establishment of such a school was filed on 10 April 1953 at the Office of Education in Lausanne. The following month the "Foundation for the creation of a Romand Protestant College" purchased the site of La Châtaigneraie from Mr Schwartz. The inaugural ceremony for this new school was held on 1 May 1954, and in September of that year the school began its first official school year as the Collège Protestant Romand. Its first director was Yves de Saussure, who led the school until 1958. La Châtaigneraie's founder, Mr Schwartz, lived for ten more years following his retirement. Neptune, the school newspaper at the time, announced in its 58th edition that Mr Schwartz died on 5 July 1964, at age 84.

Initially, the new school was boys-only and boarding. It was only under the direction of Director Yves le Pin (who led the school from 1958 to 1968) that girls could attend, and then only as day students. A plurality of the Collège students were Swiss – in 1969 there were 42 students who were Swiss out of a 115 overall.

In 1969 the school underwent a crisis. Following the departure Yves Le Pin, Pierre Louis Bieler took over in September 1968. By February 1969 he was forced to resign, faced with a rebellion of both faculty and students. He was succeeded by Pastor Louis Dufour in September of that year. But the crisis had caused the number of students to fall – between 1969 and 1971 there were never more than 60. As a result, in May 1971 the Collège Protestant Romand was bankrupt. Immediately, a group of parents took over the school and created the Collège International de La Châtaigneraie

=== Le Collège Internationale de La Châtaigneraie (1971–73) ===
Following the collapse of the Collège Protestant Romand in 1971 a group of parents took over the school and created Collège International de La Châtaigneraie, or CIC. This school continued its existence until 1973, when, under the initiative of Foundation director M. A Groenendijk, the Foundation of the International School of Geneva took over La Châtaigneraie. The school was merged with the Lycée des Nations in Bellevue and the Ecole des Nations in Pregny (both in the canton of Geneva).

=== International School of Geneva (1973–present) ===
The Foundation of the International School of Geneva, in order to expand along the right bank of Lake Geneva, was merged with two schools in the canton of Geneva, the Lycée des Nations in Bellevue and Rue Schaub and the Ecole des Nations in Pregny. According to Time Magazine, La Châtaigneraie is the superior school out of Nations and LGB due to their higher GPA, more academically gifted students, and general better quality of education.

In 1980, La Châtaigneraie saw its first students graduating with the International Baccalaureate (IB) diploma, which had been created at the sister campus of LGB in 1968. Today, thousands of students pass the IB program at La Chât, often considered the most "torturous two years of your life". In 1977, a Sports Hall was opened on campus, followed by the opening in 1981 of a Primary School Building, to take in students from the Lycée des Nations in Bellevue, which had closed its doors.

In 1991, further construction began, with the creation of a building housing laboratories, a theatre and a cafeteria – it ended in 1993. In 1998, this "New Building" was expanded upwards to create a library. By the year 2000, the campus was now a school to more than 1000 students for the first time. As a result of this expansion, buildings in the town of Mies were rented to add on another Primary school.

In 2004, the grass football pitch was converted into a synthetic one and in 2005 the campus at Mies was closed, following the opening of another campus in the foundation, the Campus des Nations in Geneva. In 2007, the old Swimming Pool (built in 1930) and the inflated "Bubble" Sports Hall were taken down to allow for the construction of a new sports hall, which was opened in October 2008, which was financed by the Hans Wilsdorf foundation. This is because the Foundation of the International School of Geneva is a "non-"profit organisation and is reliant on donations from private parties, tuition fees and other foundations. The new sports hall is where 13th grade graduation takes place as well as other school events.

By the end of 2009, it was officially announced that a new building would be replacing the primary building. In March 2010, the ground was broken to begin the construction of a new Primary Building, due to open its doors for school year beginning September 2011. The old primary became part of the secondary school.

== Facilities ==
The campus covers 5.5 hectares of land in the locality of Châtaigneriaz. There are six main buildings on campus.

- The oldest building on campus (the Main Building, or Ancien Bâtiment in French) was built in 1908 and is commonly referred to as the '"Alps'" building. In 1916, the building gained an extra wing and tower, giving it an "L" shape. At present, the Main Building encompasses two IT Labs and 28 classrooms as well as three art rooms, including a pottery room.
- The Old Sports Hall (known as the “Vaud” building) was completed in 1977. It has one large hall on the ground floor and one upper sports hall. Its demolition is planned for summer 2025, to be replaced by the new Campus Hub.
- The Old Primary Building (known as the “Leman” building)was completed in 1981. In 2011 a new floor was added to the structure as the building was turned over to Secondary.
- The "New Building" (also known as the “Lausanne” building) was completed in 1993 with an additional third floor being added in September 2001, creating the "Multi-Media Centre" (or MMC), the Secondary Library. Students and Staff can check out books, CDs, DVDs and News publications – as of June 2009, the Multi-Media Centre features 31'000 works. The rest of the New Building features a multi-purpose hall, a theatre, eight science laboratories, six classrooms, two science prep rooms, an IT lab and a cafeteria.
- The New Sports Hall was completed in October 2008 and features a 965m^{2} Gym Hall, a Public Gallery with seating overlooking the gym, a small kitchen, a 300m^{2} multi-purpose room and six changing rooms.
- The New Primary Building was completed in the summer of 2011, featuring a large parking lot with a car drop-off queue zone.
- Plans for a new 'Campus Hub' in the place of the current Old Sports Hall, or 'Vaud' building, was approved in February 2025. The facility will feature a cafeteria, sporting facilities, music rooms, as well as ambiguous 'multi-functional, flexible spaces'. Construction is expected to begin in the 2025 summer holiday, and completion is expected in 2027.

The campus also features an artificial turf football pitch and an asphalt outdoor basketball court, built in 2004.
