= Bogis-Bossey =

- Municipality
- Flag Coat of arms
- Location of Bogis-Bossey
- Location within Switzerland Location within Canton of Vaud
- Coordinates: 46°21′N 6°10′E
- Country: Switzerland
- Canton: Vaud
- District: Nyon

Government
  - Mayor: Syndic

Area
  - Total: 2.5 km^{2} (0.97 sq mi)
- Elevation: 468 m (1,535 ft)

Population (2003)
  - Total: 805
  - Density: 320/km^{2} (830/sq mi)
- Time zone: UTC+01:00 (CET)
  - Summer (DST): UTC+02:00 (CEST)
- Postal code: 1279
- SFOS number: 5705
- ISO 3166 code: CH-VD
- Surrounded by: Céligny (GE), Chavannes-de-Bogis, Crassier, Divonne-les-Bains (FR-01), Founex
- Website: www.bogis-bossey.ch

Bogis-Bossey is a municipality in the district of Nyon in the canton of Vaud in Switzerland.

== History ==
Bogis-Bossey is first mentioned in 1135 as Bittgeium ad pontetulum.

== Geography ==
Bogis-Bossey has an area, as of 2009, of 2.5 square kilometers (0.97 mi^{2}). Of this area, 1.42 km^{2} (0.55 mi^{2}) or 58.0% is used for agricultural purposes, while 0.7 km^{2} (0.27 mi^{2}) or 28.6% is forested. Of the rest of the land, 0.32 km^{2} (0.12 mi^{2}) or 13.1% is settled (buildings or roads) and 0.01 km^{2} (2.5 acres) or 0.4% is unproductive land.

Of the built up area, housing and buildings made up 9.8% and transportation infrastructure made up 2.9%. Out of the forested land, 26.5% of the total land area is heavily forested and 2.0% is covered with orchards or small clusters of trees. Of the agricultural land, 52.7% is used for growing crops and 4.5% is pastures.

The municipality was part of the Nyon District until it was dissolved on 31 August 2006, and Bogis-Bossey became part of the new district of Nyon.

The municipality is located on the left bank of the Versoix river. It consists of the village of Bogis, on the border with the French commune of Divonne-les-Bains (Pays de Gex), and the hamlets of Bossey (with Bossey Castle), l'Hostellerie, Petit-Bossey and Belle-Ferme.

== Coat of arms ==
The blazon of the municipal coat of arms is Per fess, 1. Argent, seme of billets Sable, semi-lion Sable langued Gules; 2. paly of six Or and Gules.

== Demographics ==
Bogis-Bossey has a population (as of December 2020) of 847. As of 2008, 37.4% of the population are resident foreign nationals. Over the last 10 years (1999–2009) the population has changed at a rate of 9.1%. It has changed at a rate of 2.9% due to migration and at a rate of 7.7% due to births and deaths.

Most of the population (as of 2000) speaks French (560 or 66.1%), with English being second most common (146 or 17.2%) and German being third (65 or 7.7%). There are 10 people who speak Italian.

The age distribution, as of 2009, in Bogis-Bossey is; 112 children or 13.4% of the population are between 0 and 9 years old and 136 teenagers or 16.2% are between 10 and 19. Of the adult population, 94 people or 11.2% of the population are between 20 and 29 years old. 97 people or 11.6% are between 30 and 39, 154 people or 18.4% are between 40 and 49, and 122 people or 14.6% are between 50 and 59. The senior population distribution is 90 people or 10.7% of the population are between 60 and 69 years old, 23 people or 2.7% are between 70 and 79, there are 10 people or 1.2% who are between 80 and 89.

As of 2000, there were 373 people who were single and never married in the municipality. There were 437 married individuals, 8 widows or widowers and 29 individuals who are divorced.

As of 2000, there were 264 private households in the municipality, and an average of 2.9 persons per household. There were 50 households that consist of only one person and 33 households with five or more people. Out of a total of 276 households that answered this question, 18.1% were households made up of just one person. Of the rest of the households, there are 65 married couples without children, 133 married couples with children There were 13 single parents with a child or children. There were 3 households that were made up of unrelated people and 12 households that were made up of some sort of institution or another collective housing.

In 2000 there were 189 single family homes (or 82.5% of the total) out of a total of 229 inhabited buildings. There were 23 multi-family buildings (10.0%), along with 13 multi-purpose buildings that were mostly used for housing (5.7%) and 4 other use buildings (commercial or industrial) that also had some housing (1.7%).

In 2000, a total of 248 apartments (84.1% of the total) were permanently occupied, while 45 apartments (15.3%) were seasonally occupied and 2 apartments (0.7%) were empty. As of 2009, the construction rate of new housing units was 8.6 new units per 1000 residents. The vacancy rate for the municipality, in 2010, was 0.9%.

The historical population is given in the following chart:

== Politics ==
In the 2007 federal election the most popular party was the SVP which received 25.4% of the vote. The next three most popular parties were the LPS Party (15.9%), the Green Party (15.29%) and the FDP (14.71%). In the federal election, a total of 176 votes were cast, and the voter turnout was 41.9%.

== Economy ==
As of 2010, Bogis-Bossey had an unemployment rate of 3.6%. As of 2008, there were 21 people employed in the primary economic sector and about 7 businesses involved in this sector. 10 people were employed in the secondary sector and there were 5 businesses in this sector. 111 people were employed in the tertiary sector, with 19 businesses in this sector. There were 411 residents of the municipality who were employed in some capacity, of which females made up 41.6% of the workforce.

In 2008 the total number of full-time equivalent jobs was 121. The number of jobs in the primary sector was 11, all of which were in agriculture. The number of jobs in the secondary sector was 9 of which 2 or (22.2%) were in manufacturing and 7 (77.8%) were in construction. The number of jobs in the tertiary sector was 101. In the tertiary sector; 4 or 4.0% were in wholesale or retail sales or the repair of motor vehicles, 4 or 4.0% were in the movement and storage of goods, 11 or 10.9% were in a hotel or restaurant, 1 was in the information industry, 11 or 10.9% were technical professionals or scientists, 7 or 6.9% were in education and 1 was in health care.

In 2000, there were 43 workers who commuted into the municipality and 360 workers who commuted away. The municipality is a net exporter of workers, with about 8.4 workers leaving the municipality for every one entering. About 25.6% of the workforce coming into Bogis-Bossey are coming from outside Switzerland. Of the working population, 8.8% used public transportation to get to work, and 80% used a private car.

== Religion ==
From the 2000 census, 226 or 26.7% were Roman Catholic, while 242 or 28.6% belonged to the Swiss Reformed Church. Of the rest of the population, there were 10 members of an Orthodox church (or about 1.18% of the population), there were 2 individuals (or about 0.24% of the population) who belonged to the Christian Catholic Church, and there were 50 individuals (or about 5.90% of the population) who belonged to another Christian church. There were 14 individuals (or about 1.65% of the population) who were Jewish, and 10 (or about 1.18% of the population) who were Islamic. There were 9 individuals who were Buddhist, 4 individuals who were Hindu and 3 individuals who belonged to another church. 177 (or about 20.90% of the population) belonged to no church, are agnostic or atheist, and 115 individuals (or about 13.58% of the population) did not answer the question.

== Education ==
In Bogis-Bossey about 220 or (26.0%) of the population have completed non-mandatory upper secondary education, and 218 or (25.7%) have completed additional higher education (either university or a Fachhochschule). Of the 218 who completed tertiary schooling, 34.9% were Swiss men, 18.8% were Swiss women, 24.8% were non-Swiss men and 21.6% were non-Swiss women.

In the 2009/2010 school year there were a total of 106 students in the Bogis-Bossey school district. In the Vaud cantonal school system, two years of non-obligatory pre-school are provided by the political districts. During the school year, the political district provided pre-school care for a total of 1,249 children of which 563 children (45.1%) received subsidized pre-school care. The canton's primary school program requires students to attend for four years. There were 58 students in the municipal primary school program. The obligatory lower secondary school program lasts for six years and there were 47 students in those schools. There were also 1 students who were home schooled or attended another non-traditional school.

As of 2000, there were 222 students from Bogis-Bossey who attended schools outside the municipality.

The Bossey Ecumenical Institute at the Château de Bossey, an academic institution of the World Council of Churches, is situated in Bogis-Bossey.
