= Commugny =

- Municipality
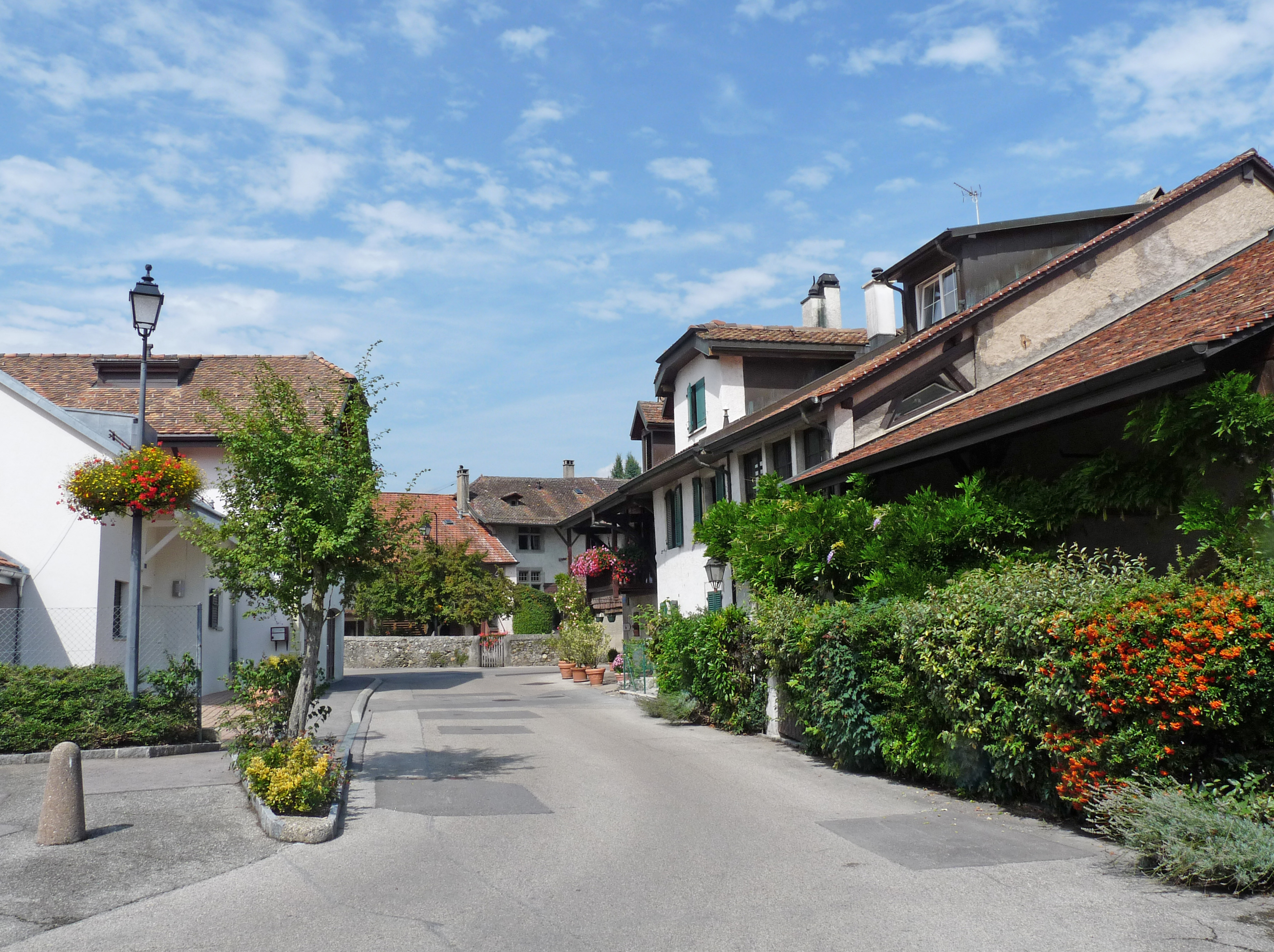

- Flag Coat of arms
- Location of Commugny
- Location within Switzerland Location within Canton of Vaud
- Coordinates: 46°19′N 6°11′E
- Country: Switzerland
- Canton: Vaud
- District: Nyon

Government
  - Mayor: Syndic

Area
  - Total: 6.52 km^{2} (2.52 sq mi)
- Elevation: 419 m (1,375 ft)

Population (2003)
  - Total: 2,377
  - Density: 365/km^{2} (944/sq mi)
- Time zone: UTC+01:00 (CET)
  - Summer (DST): UTC+02:00 (CEST)
- Postal code: 1291
- SFOS number: 5711
- ISO 3166 code: CH-VD
- Surrounded by: Chavannes-de-Bogis, Chavannes-des-Bois, Coppet, Divonne-les-Bains (FR-01), Founex, Grilly (FR-01), Tannay
- Website: www.commugny.ch

Commugny is a municipality in the district of Nyon in the canton of Vaud in Switzerland.

== History ==
Commugny is first mentioned in 1018 as Communiacum.

== Geography ==
Aerial view from 500 m by Walter Mittelholzer, Coppet at the lake, right behind it Commugny (1930)

Commugny has an area, as of 2009, of 6.5 square kilometers (2.5 mi^{2}). Of this area, 3.93 km^{2} (1.52 mi^{2}) or 60.4% is used for agricultural purposes, while 1.29 km^{2} (0.50 mi^{2}) or 19.8% is forested. Of the rest of the land, 1.21 km^{2} (0.47 mi^{2}) or 18.6% is settled (buildings or roads), 0.01 km^{2} (2.5 acres) or 0.2% is either rivers or lakes and 0.05 km^{2} (12 acres) or 0.8% is unproductive land.

Of the built up area, housing and buildings made up 14.7% and transportation infrastructure made up 3.4%. Out of the forested land, all of the forested land area is covered with heavy forests. Of the agricultural land, 48.8% is used for growing crops and 3.4% is pastures, while 8.1% is used for orchards or vine crops. All the water in the municipality is flowing water.

The municipality was part of the old Nyon District until it was dissolved on 31 August 2006, and Commugny became part of the new district of Nyon.

The municipality is located near the French border.

== Coat of arms ==
The blazon of the municipal coat of arms is Gules, a Pallet Argent, overall a Bell Or.

== Demographics ==
Commugny has a population (as of December 2020) of 3,004. As of 2008, 37.3% of the population are resident foreign nationals. Over the last 10 years (1999–2009 ) the population has changed at a rate of 6.7%. It has changed at a rate of 0.9% due to migration and at a rate of 6.3% due to births and deaths.

Most of the population (as of 2000) speaks French (1,715 or 65.9%), with English being second most common (443 or 17.0%) and German being third (215 or 8.3%). There are 28 people who speak Italian and 1 person who speaks Romansh.

The age distribution, as of 2009, in Commugny is; 323 children or 13.1% of the population are between 0 and 9 years old and 377 teenagers or 15.3% are between 10 and 19. Of the adult population, 207 people or 8.4% of the population are between 20 and 29 years old. 269 people or 10.9% are between 30 and 39, 459 people or 18.6% are between 40 and 49, and 294 people or 11.9% are between 50 and 59. The senior population distribution is 333 people or 13.5% of the population are between 60 and 69 years old, 148 people or 6.0% are between 70 and 79, there are 50 people or 2.0% who are between 80 and 89, and there are 2 people or 0.1% who are 90 and older.

As of 2000, there were 1,054 people who were single and never married in the municipality. There were 1,389 married individuals, 52 widows or widowers and 108 individuals who are divorced.

As of 2000, there were 869 private households in the municipality, and an average of 2.8 persons per household. There were 155 households that consist of only one person and 87 households with five or more people. Out of a total of 890 households that answered this question, 17.4% were households made up of just one person and there was 1 adult who lived with their parents. Of the rest of the households, there are 227 married couples without children, 417 married couples with children There were 62 single parents with a child or children. There were 7 households that were made up of unrelated people and 21 households that were made up of some sort of institution or another collective housing.

In 2000 there were 606 single family homes (or 83.6% of the total) out of a total of 725 inhabited buildings. There were 64 multi-family buildings (8.8%), along with 48 multi-purpose buildings that were mostly used for housing (6.6%) and 7 other use buildings (commercial or industrial) that also had some housing (1.0%).

In 2000, a total of 814 apartments (88.2% of the total) were permanently occupied, while 98 apartments (10.6%) were seasonally occupied and 11 apartments (1.2%) were empty. As of 2009, the construction rate of new housing units was 0.7 new units per 1000 residents. The vacancy rate for the municipality, in 2010, was 0.3%.

The historical population is given in the following chart:

== Politics ==
In the 2007 federal election the most popular party was the SVP which received 21.78% of the vote. The next three most popular parties were the LPS Party (16.43%), the FDP (15.51%) and the Green Party (14.58%). In the federal election, a total of 622 votes were cast, and the voter turnout was 48.3%.

== Economy ==
As of 2010, Commugny had an unemployment rate of 2.8%. As of 2008, there were 28 people employed in the primary economic sector and about 10 businesses involved in this sector. 19 people were employed in the secondary sector and there were 8 businesses in this sector. 164 people were employed in the tertiary sector, with 62 businesses in this sector. There were 1,301 residents of the municipality who were employed in some capacity, of which females made up 42.6% of the workforce.

In 2008 the total number of full-time equivalent jobs was 181. The number of jobs in the primary sector was 22, all of which were in agriculture. The number of jobs in the secondary sector was 16 of which 13 or (81.3%) were in manufacturing and 3 (18.8%) were in construction. The number of jobs in the tertiary sector was 143. In the tertiary sector; 23 or 16.1% were in wholesale or retail sales or the repair of motor vehicles, 27 or 18.9% were in a hotel or restaurant, 2 or 1.4% were in the information industry, 15 or 10.5% were the insurance or financial industry, 24 or 16.8% were technical professionals or scientists, 15 or 10.5% were in education and 6 or 4.2% were in health care.

In 2000, there were 92 workers who commuted into the municipality and 1,102 workers who commuted away. The municipality is a net exporter of workers, with about 12.0 workers leaving the municipality for every one entering. About 9.8% of the workforce coming into Commugny are coming from outside Switzerland, while 0.3% of the locals commute out of Switzerland for work. Of the working population, 9.7% used public transportation to get to work, and 75.7% used a private car.

== Religion ==
From the 2000 census, 853 or 32.8% were Roman Catholic, while 802 or 30.8% belonged to the Swiss Reformed Church. Of the rest of the population, there were 14 members of an Orthodox church (or about 0.54% of the population), there was 1 individual who belongs to the Christian Catholic Church, and there were 146 individuals (or about 5.61% of the population) who belonged to another Christian church. There were 12 individuals (or about 0.46% of the population) who were Jewish, and 48 (or about 1.84% of the population) who were Islamic. There were 7 individuals who were Buddhist, 5 individuals who were Hindu and 5 individuals who belonged to another church. 468 (or about 17.98% of the population) belonged to no church, are agnostic or atheist, and 293 individuals (or about 11.26% of the population) did not answer the question.

Commugny lies on the Way of St. James, one of the pilgrimage routes to Santiago de Compostela.

== Education ==
In Commugny about 676 or (26.0%) of the population have completed non-mandatory upper secondary education, and 829 or (31.8%) have completed additional higher education (either university or a Fachhochschule). Of the 829 who completed tertiary schooling, 33.2% were Swiss men, 23.2% were Swiss women, 24.0% were non-Swiss men and 19.7% were non-Swiss women.

In the 2009/2010 school year there were a total of 282 students in the Commugny school district. In the Vaud cantonal school system, two years of non-obligatory pre-school are provided by the political districts. During the school year, the political district provided pre-school care for a total of 1,249 children of which 563 children (45.1%) received subsidized pre-school care. The canton's primary school program requires students to attend for four years. There were 154 students in the municipal primary school program. The obligatory lower secondary school program lasts for six years and there were 127 students in those schools. There was also 1 student was home schooled or attended another non-traditional school.

As of 2000, there were 15 students in Commugny who came from another municipality, while 467 residents attended schools outside the municipality.

== Personalities ==
- Commugny witnessed Jean Lanfray's murder of his wife and two children under the influence of absinthe and other hard liquors in 1905, which led to absinthe being banned in Switzerland.
- George de Mestral, inventor of Velcro, lived and died in Commugny, where a road is named after him.

== Buildings ==
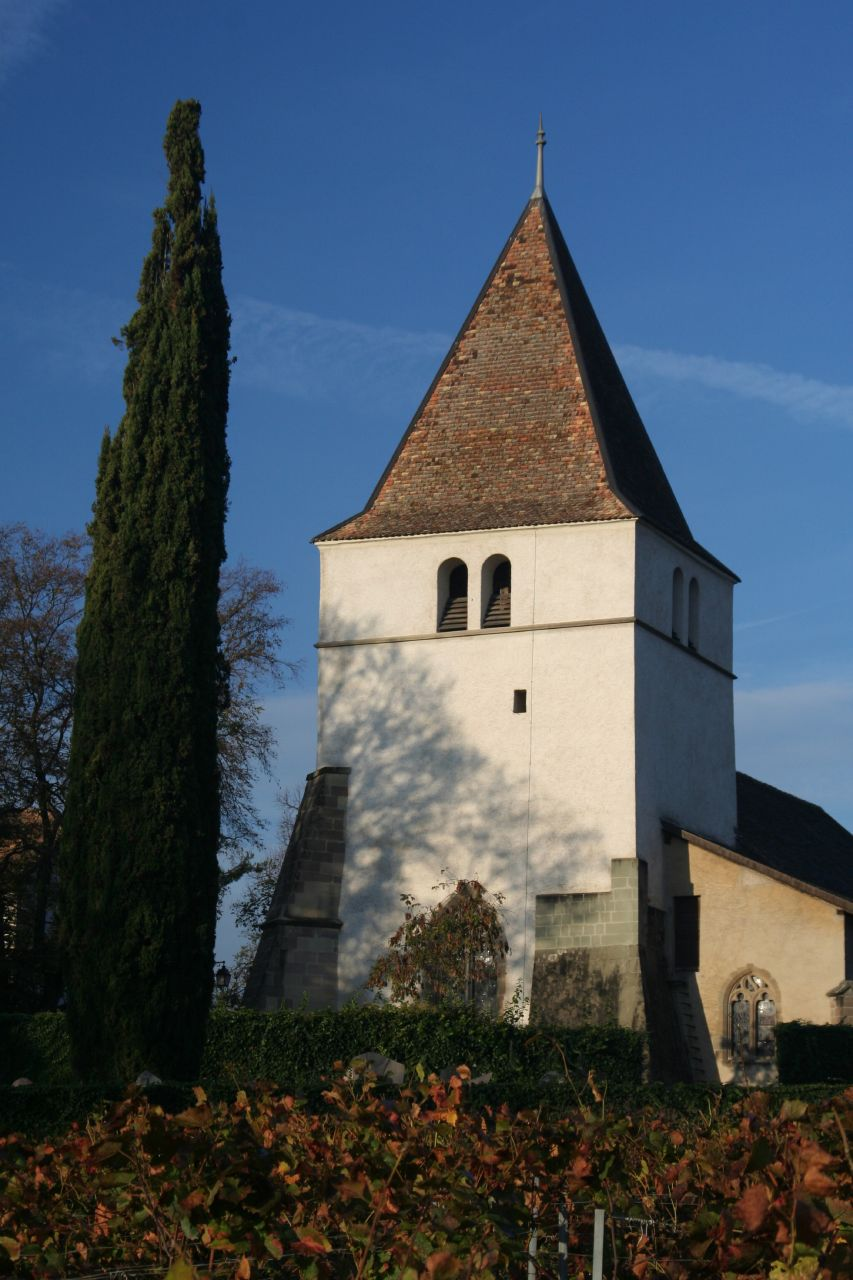
Commugny, Church of St. Christophe

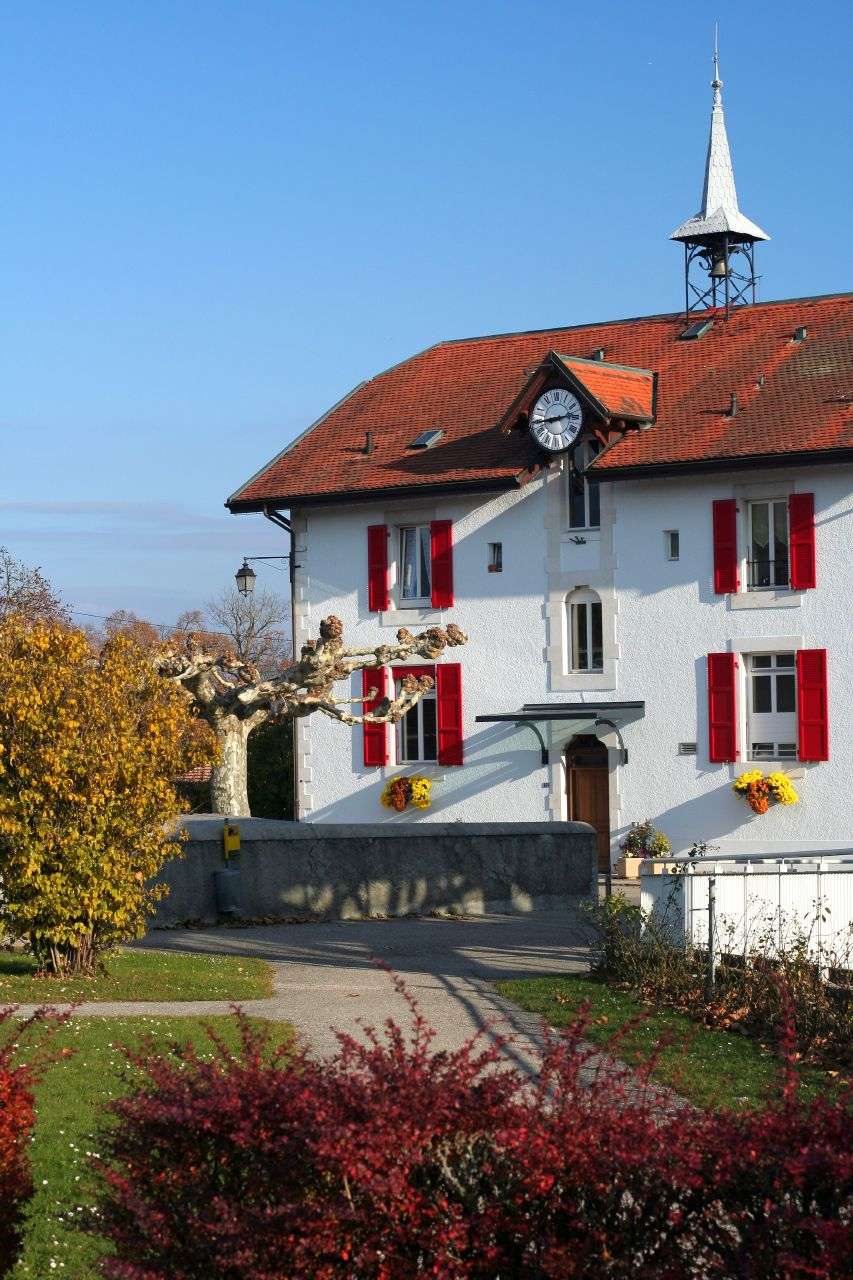
Commugny, Maison de Commune (administration offices)
