= Founex =

- Municipality
- Flag Coat of arms
- Location of Founex
- Location within Switzerland Location within Canton of Vaud
- Coordinates: 46°19′N 06°11′E
- Country: Switzerland
- Canton: Vaud
- District: Nyon

Government
  - Mayor: Syndic; François Debluë

Area
  - Total: 4.79 km^{2} (1.85 sq mi)
- Elevation: 399 m (1,309 ft)

Population (2004)
  - Total: 2,559
  - Density: 534/km^{2} (1,380/sq mi)
- Demonym: Les Founachus
- Time zone: UTC+01:00 (CET)
  - Summer (DST): UTC+02:00 (CEST)
- Postal code: 1297
- SFOS number: 5717
- ISO 3166 code: CH-VD
- Localities: Chataigneriaz, Les Neyruaz
- Surrounded by: Bogis-Bossey, Céligny (GE), Coppet, Commugny, Chavannes-de-Bogis
- Website: www.founex.ch

Founex is a municipality in the district of Nyon in the canton of Vaud in Switzerland.

== History ==
Signs of Roman-era inhabitation were found near Le Gachet. The first appearance of the village was in 1224 under the name Fosnay. In 1251 it changed to Founai. During Middle Ages, Founex belonged to the abbey of Saint Maurice. It was later influenced by the Barony of Coppet, the diocese of Geneva and the Bernese occupation.

When the separation of Vaud from Bern occurred in 1536 the village came under control of the district of Nyon. In the 14th century a Cistercian abbey Bonmont and the dependent la Châtaigneraie joined Founex. After the Ancien Régime Founex was, from 1798 to 1803 in the Helvetic Republic's Canton of Léman.

On July 8, 1886 phylloxera vastatrix is identified in a local vineyard.

In 2002, Founex and 8 other villages formed the area called the Terre Sainte, although a formalisation of such union into a legal unification was rejected by the Founex general council on 30 August 2010.

== Geography ==
Founex has an area, as of 2009, of 4.8 square kilometers (1.9 mi^{2}). Of this area, 3.12 km^{2} (1.20 mi^{2}) or 65.1% is used for agricultural purposes, while 0.11 km^{2} (0.042 mi^{2}) or 2.3% is forested. Of the rest of the land, 1.54 km^{2} (0.59 mi^{2}) or 32.2% is settled (buildings or roads).

Of the built up area, housing and buildings made up 24.6% and transportation infrastructure made up 5.0%. Power and water infrastructure as well as other special developed areas made up 1.5% of the area Out of the forested land, all of the forested land area is covered with heavy forests. Of the agricultural land, 35.7% is used for growing crops and 4.4% is pastures, while 25.1% is used for orchards or vine crops.

The municipality was part of the Nyon District until it was dissolved on 31 August 2006, and Founex became part of the new district of Nyon.

It consists of the village of Founex and the hamlets of Châtaigneraie and Le Gachet.

== Coat of arms ==
The blazon of the municipal coat of arms is Azure, scales Argent.

== Demographics ==
Founex has a population (as of December 2020) of 3,874. As of 2008, 42.7% of the population are resident foreign nationals. Over the last 10 years (1999–2009) the population has changed at a rate of 24.9%. It has changed at a rate of 17.2% due to migration and at a rate of 7.9% due to births and deaths.

Most of the population (as of 2000) speaks French (1,701 or 64.2%), with English being second most common (378 or 14.3%) and German being third (185 or 7.0%). There are 73 people who speak Italian.

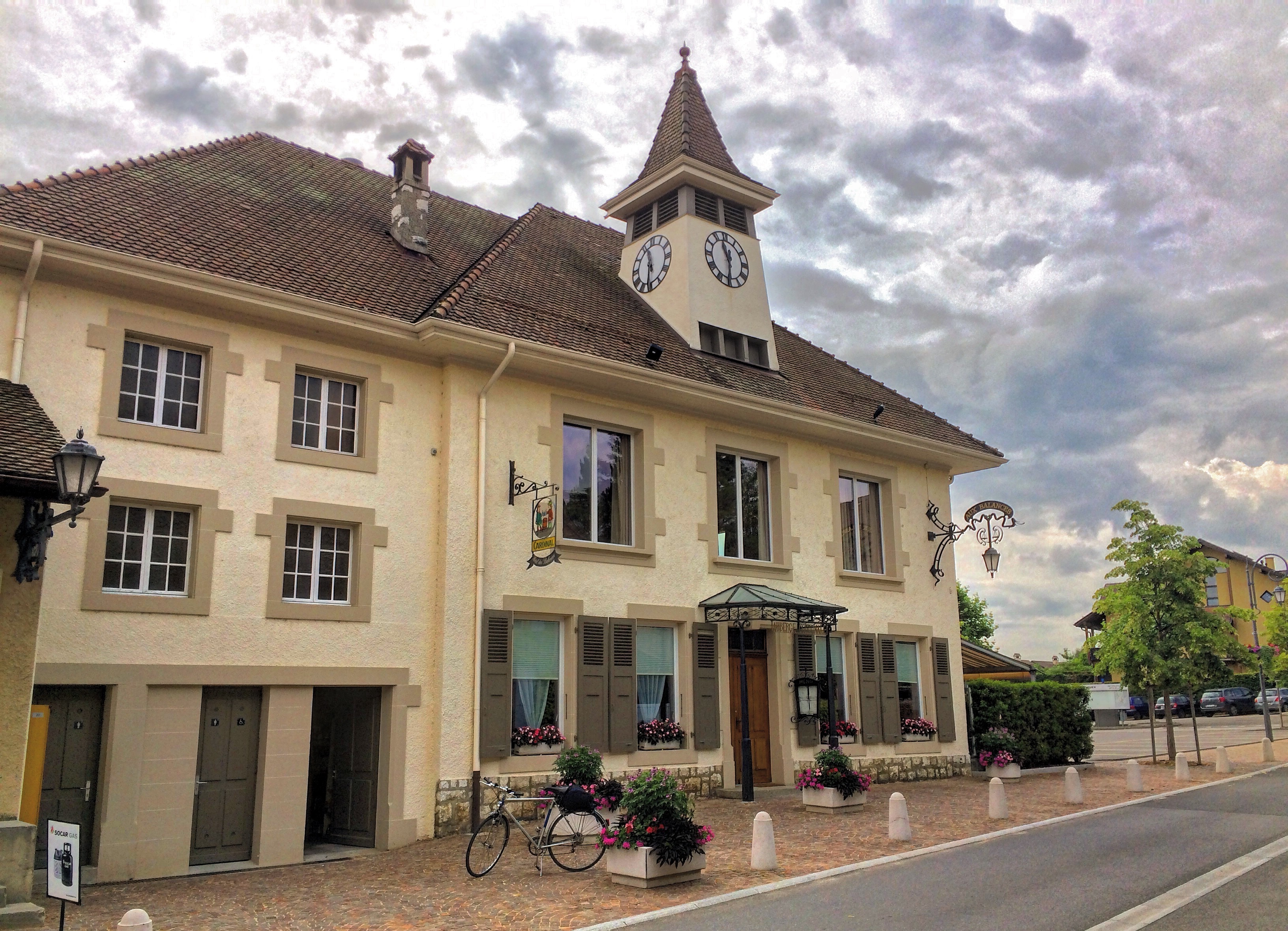
Auberge communale. 2016.

The age distribution, as of 2009, in Founex is; 418 children or 14.2% of the population are between 0 and 9 years old and 440 teenagers or 15.0% are between 10 and 19. Of the adult population, 274 people or 9.3% of the population are between 20 and 29 years old. 383 people or 13.1% are between 30 and 39, 548 people or 18.7% are between 40 and 49, and 360 people or 12.3% are between 50 and 59. The senior population distribution is 291 people or 9.9% of the population are between 60 and 69 years old, 149 people or 5.1% are between 70 and 79, there are 64 people or 2.2% who are between 80 and 89, and there are 7 people or 0.2% who are 90 and older.

As of 2000, there were 1,113 people who were single and never married in the municipality. There were 1,351 married individuals, 66 widows or widowers and 118 individuals who are divorced.

As of 2000, there were 986 private households in the municipality, and an average of 2.7 persons per household. There were 238 households that consist of only one person and 100 households with five or more people. Out of a total of 995 households that answered this question, 23.9% were households made up of just one person and there were 5 adults who lived with their parents. Of the rest of the households, there are 250 married couples without children, 408 married couples with children There were 69 single parents with a child or children. There were 16 households that were made up of unrelated people and 9 households that were made up of some sort of institution or another collective housing.

In 2000 there were 582 single family homes (or 80.1% of the total) out of a total of 727 inhabited buildings. There were 83 multi-family buildings (11.4%), along with 44 multi-purpose buildings that were mostly used for housing (6.1%) and 18 other use buildings (commercial or industrial) that also had some housing (2.5%).

In 2000, a total of 851 apartments (88.8% of the total) were permanently occupied, while 79 apartments (8.2%) were seasonally occupied and 28 apartments (2.9%) were empty. As of 2009, the construction rate of new housing units was 6.5 new units per 1000 residents. The vacancy rate for the municipality, in 2010, was 0%.

The historical population is given in the following chart:

== Politics ==
In the 2007 federal election the most popular party was the SVP which received 24.48% of the vote. The next three most popular parties were the LPS Party (19.19%), the FDP (18.7%) and the SP (11.77%). In the federal election, a total of 634 votes were cast, and the voter turnout was 48.4%.

== Economy ==
As of 2010, Founex had an unemployment rate of 3.2%. As of 2008, there were 80 people employed in the primary economic sector and about 12 businesses involved in this sector. 39 people were employed in the secondary sector and there were 14 businesses in this sector. 616 people were employed in the tertiary sector, with 66 businesses in this sector. There were 1,268 residents of the municipality who were employed in some capacity, of which females made up 43.3% of the workforce.

In 2008 the total number of full-time equivalent jobs was 598. The number of jobs in the primary sector was 60, of which 59 were in agriculture and were in fishing or fisheries. The number of jobs in the secondary sector was 31 of which 12 or (38.7%) were in manufacturing and 13 (41.9%) were in construction. The number of jobs in the tertiary sector was 507. In the tertiary sector; 26 or 5.1% were in wholesale or retail sales or the repair of motor vehicles, 6 or 1.2% were in the movement and storage of goods, 23 or 4.5% were in a hotel or restaurant, 18 or 3.6% were in the information industry, 3 or 0.6% were the insurance or financial industry, 27 or 5.3% were technical professionals or scientists, 190 or 37.5% were in education and 14 or 2.8% were in health care.

In 2000, there were 373 workers who commuted into the municipality and 1,039 workers who commuted away. The municipality is a net exporter of workers, with about 2.8 workers leaving the municipality for every one entering. About 16.9% of the workforce coming into Founex are coming from outside Switzerland, while 0.2% of the locals commute out of Switzerland for work. Of the working population, 13.8% used public transportation to get to work, and 69.1% used a private car.

== Public buildings ==
The Catholic chapel of Saint Robert de Molesmes is located between the lake and the Route Suisse. The building was erected in 1898-1899 on land donated by Baroness Double de Saint Lambert. It was inaugurated and blessed on 3 August 1899 by Joseph Déruaz, Bishop of Lausanne, Geneva and Fribourg. On 8 May 1925, Marius Besson established it as a parish. The chronology of its incumbents is shown in the table below.(upcoming)

Founex sightings

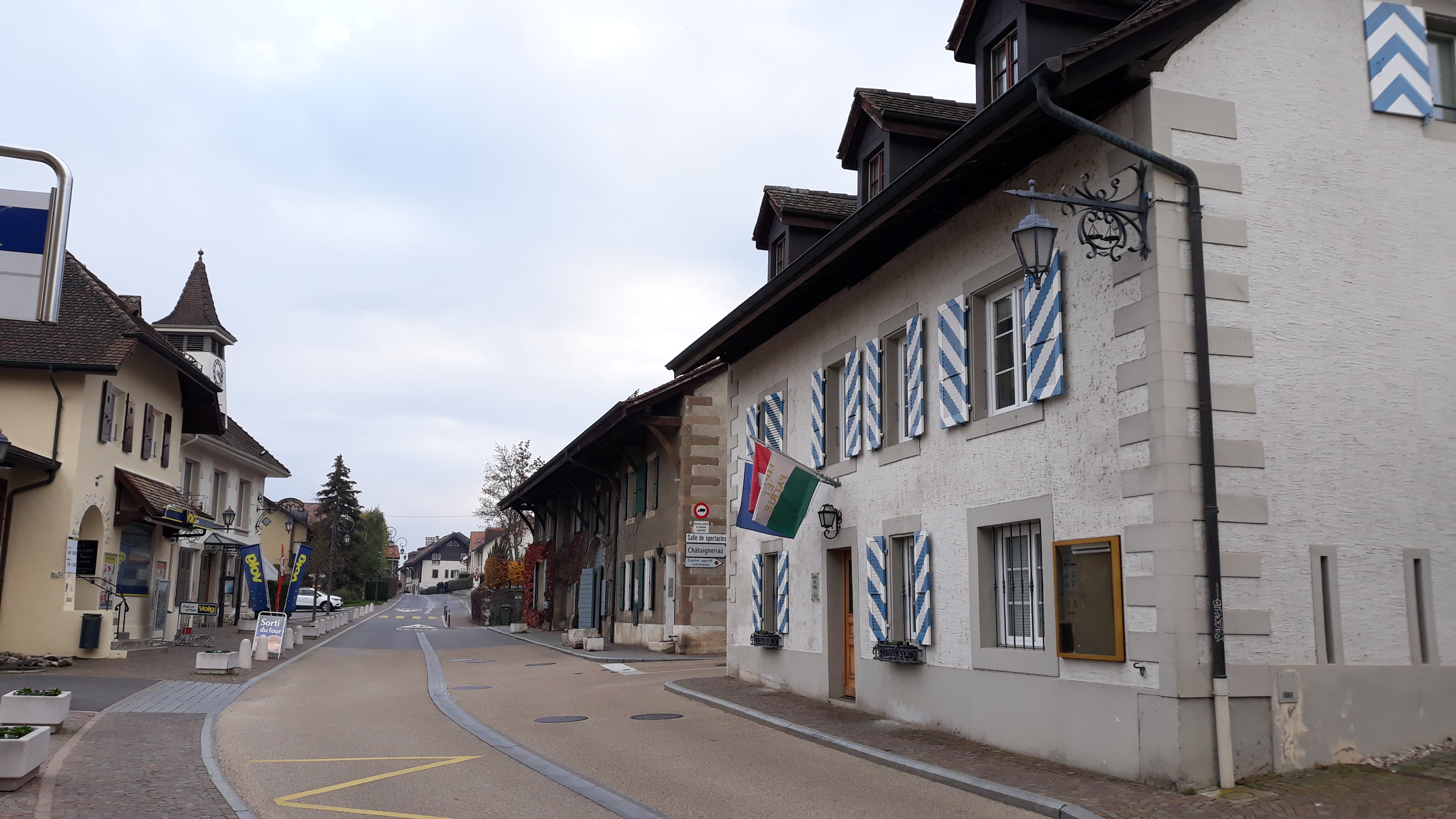
Grand'rue (High street).

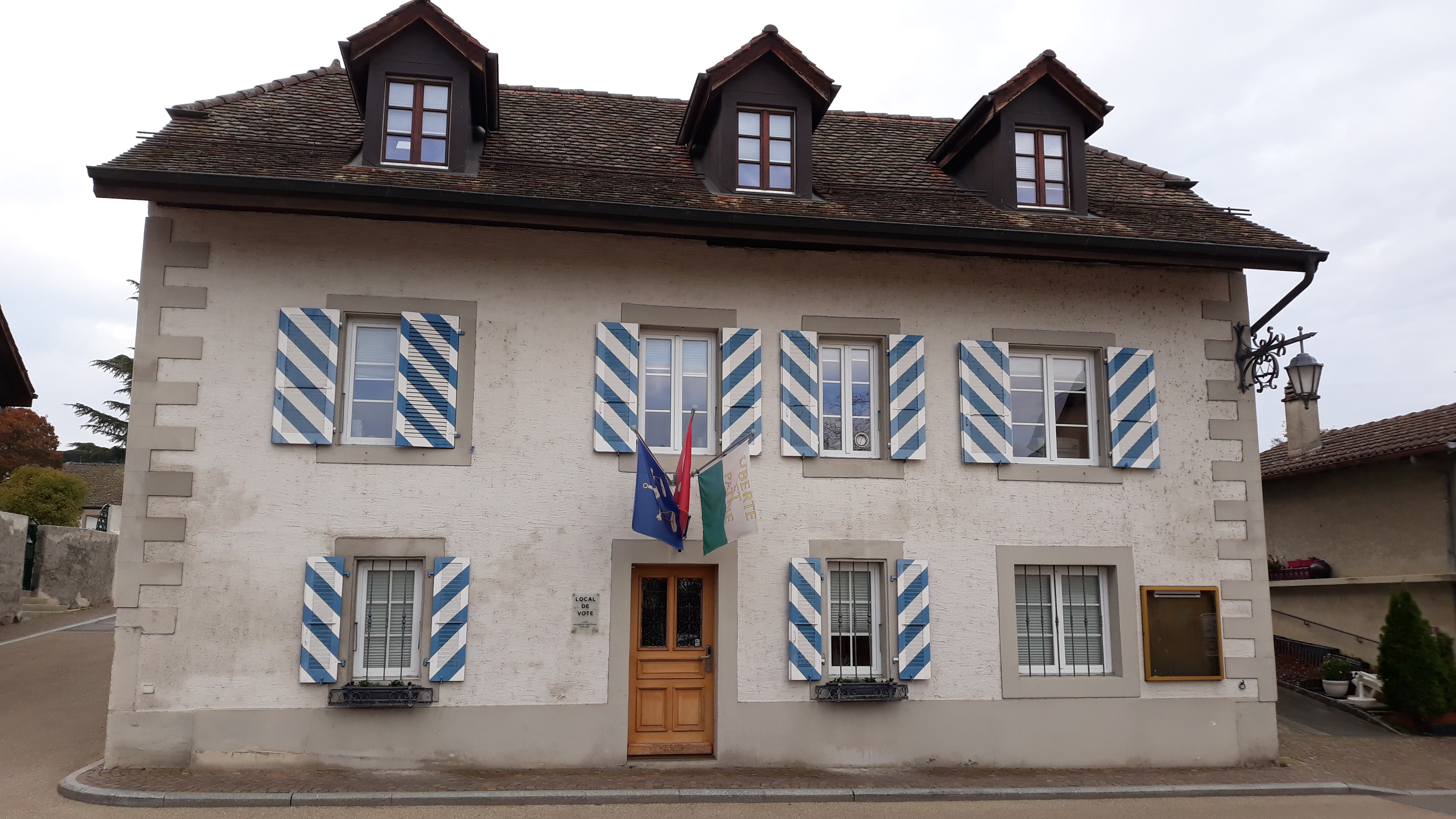
City hall.

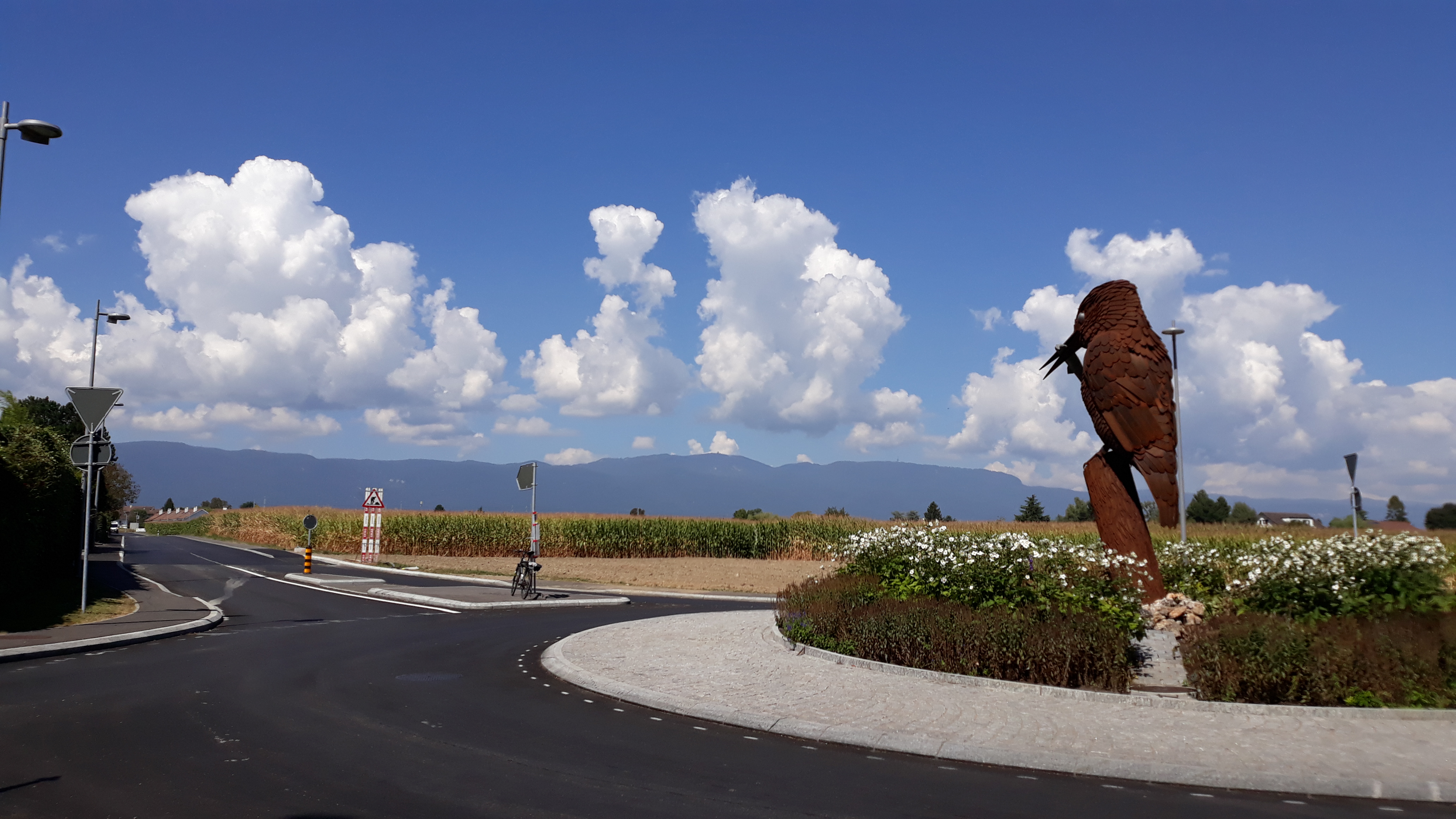
Route Suisse crossroad.

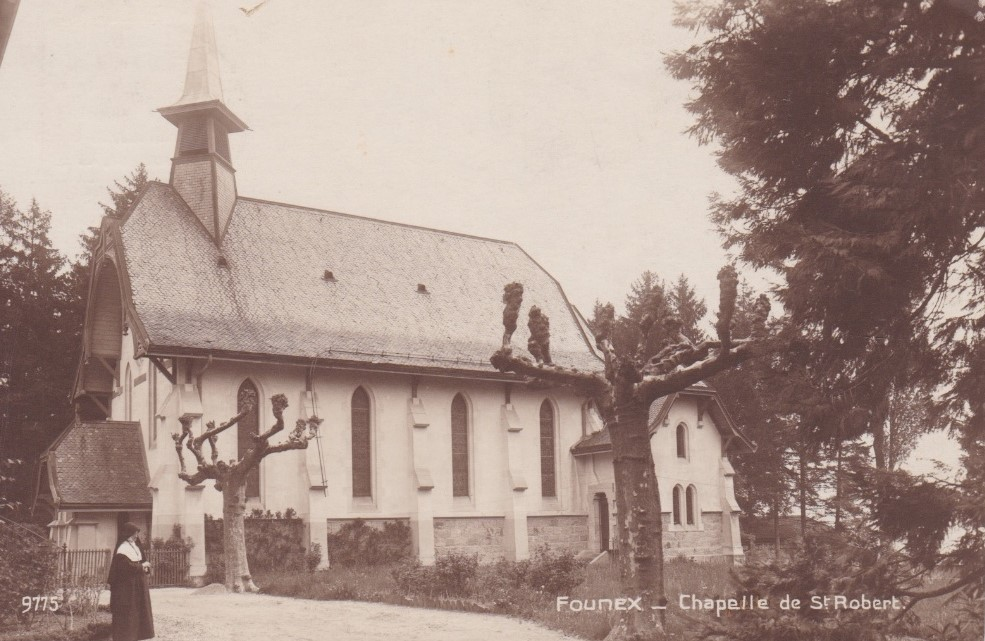
St Robert chapel.

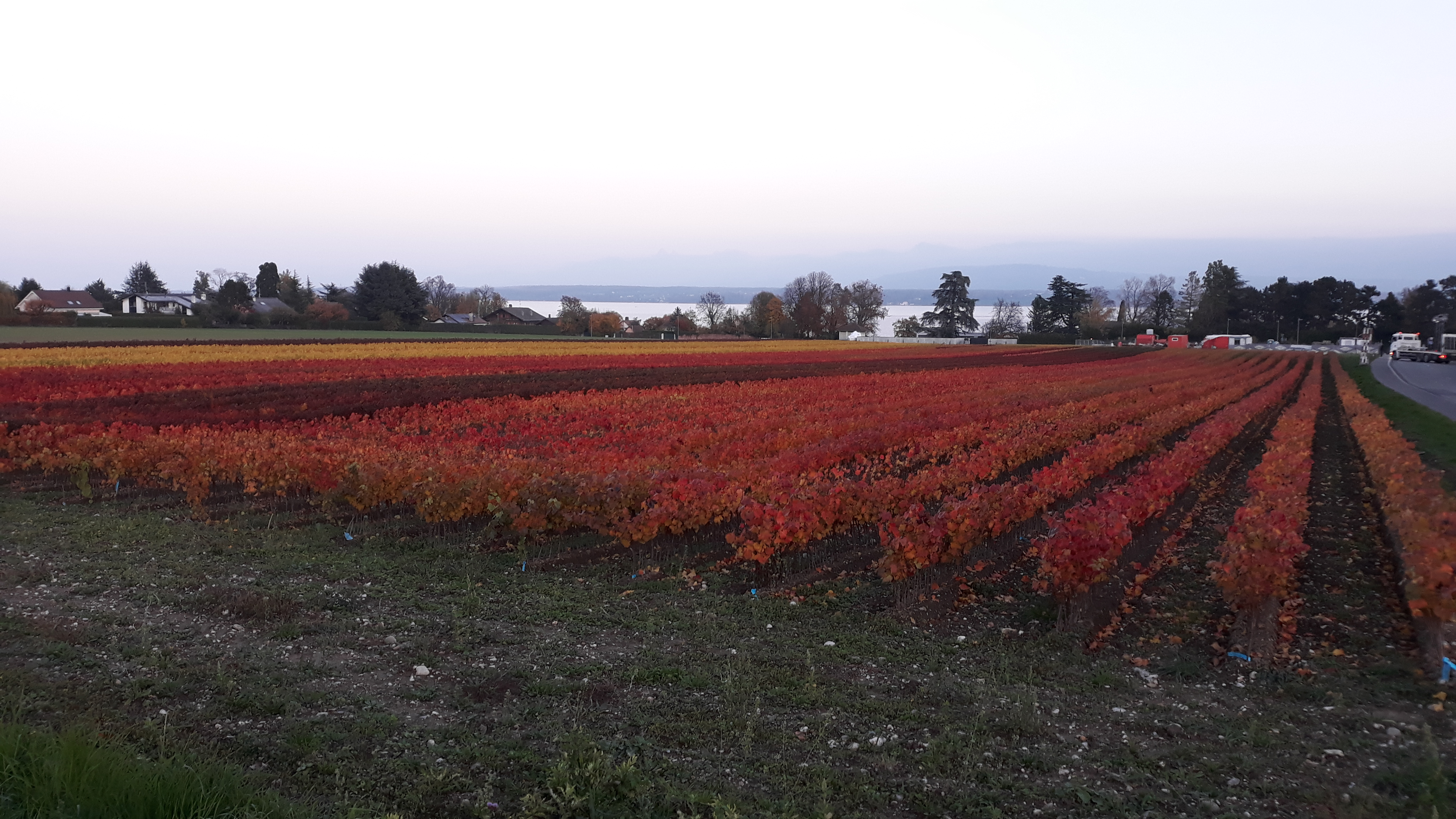
Grape seedlings.

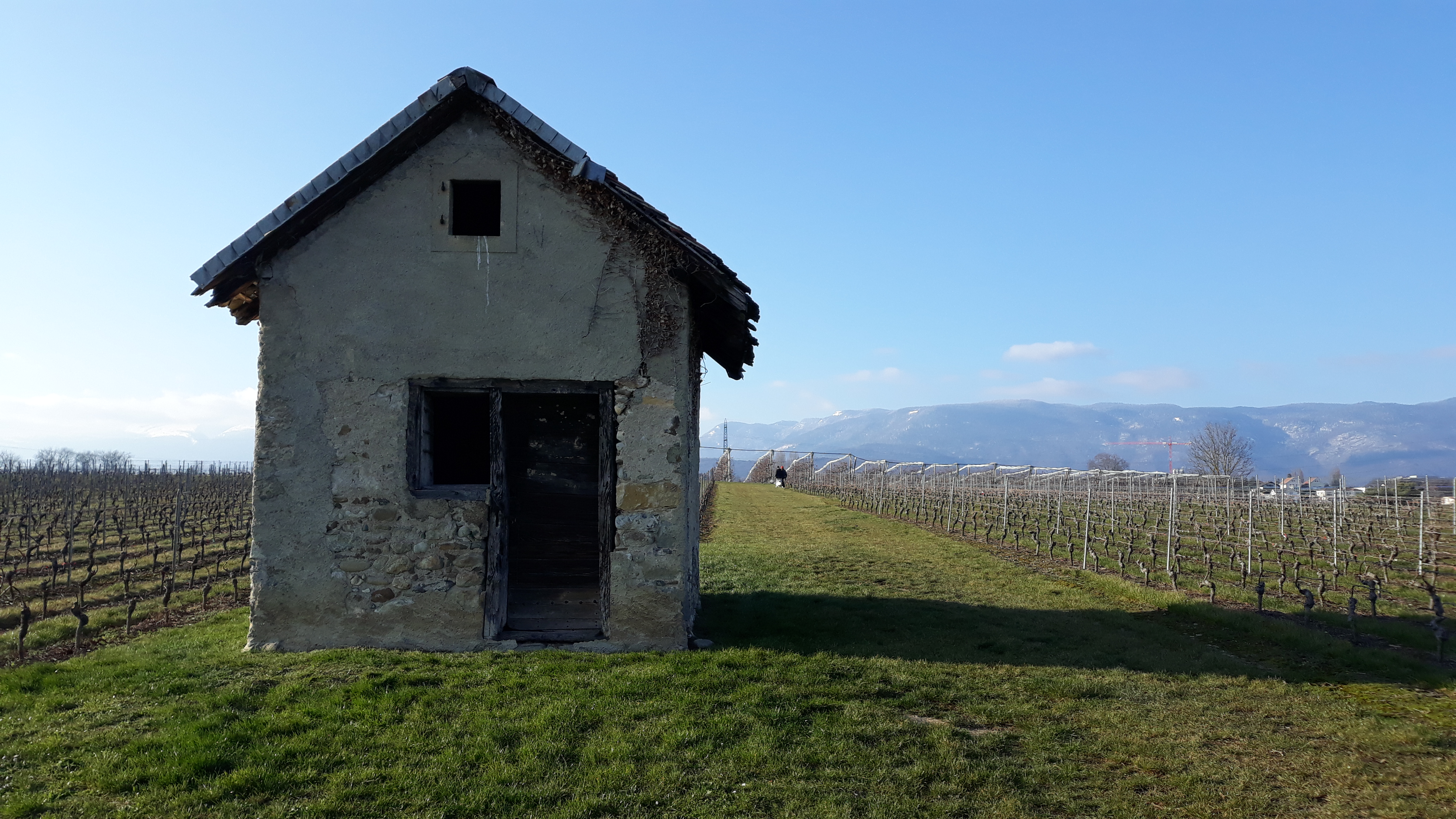
Grape grower's hut an Jura hills.

== Religion ==
From the 2000 census, 872 or 32.9% were Roman Catholic, while 761 or 28.7% belonged to the Swiss Reformed Church. Of the rest of the population, there were 38 members of an Orthodox church (or about 1.44% of the population), there were 6 individuals (or about 0.23% of the population) who belonged to the Christian Catholic Church, and there were 131 individuals (or about 4.95% of the population) who belonged to another Christian church. There were 25 individuals (or about 0.94% of the population) who were Jewish, and 74 (or about 2.79% of the population) who were Islamic. There were 5 individuals who were Buddhist, 4 individuals who were Hindu and 7 individuals who belonged to another church. 528 (or about 19.94% of the population) belonged to no church, are agnostic or atheist, and 238 individuals (or about 8.99% of the population) did not answer the question.

The Catholic Chapel Saint Robert de Molesmes is located between the lake and the Swiss road. This building was erected in 1898-1899 on land donated by Baroness Double de Saint Lambert. It was inaugurated and blessed on August 3, 1899 by Monsignor Déruaz. On May 8, 1925 Monsignor Besson instituted it as a parish.

== Education ==
The International School of Geneva's campus La Châtaigneraie is located in the locality of Châtaigneriaz.

In Founex about 723 or (27.3%) of the population have completed non-mandatory upper secondary education, and 796 or (30.1%) have completed additional higher education (either university or a Fachhochschule). Of the 796 who completed tertiary schooling, 33.4% were Swiss men, 20.9% were Swiss women, 24.5% were non-Swiss men and 21.2% were non-Swiss women.

In the 2009/2010 school year there were a total of 333 students in the Founex school district. In the Vaud cantonal school system, two years of non-obligatory pre-school are provided by the political districts. During the school year, the political district provided pre-school care for a total of 1,249 children of which 563 children (45.1%) received subsidized pre-school care. The canton's primary school program requires students to attend for four years. There were 186 students in the municipal primary school program. The obligatory lower secondary school program lasts for six years and there were 147 students in those schools.

As of 2000, there were 811 students in Founex who came from another municipality, while 368 residents attended schools outside the municipality.

== Notable people ==
- Jean-Jacques Dunant, (1742,1802), syndic of Geneva
- Louis François Senn, (1799–1873), Doctor of Medicine and Surgery, politician; buried in Founex.
- Édouard Rod, (1857–1910) Swiss journalist and writer.
- Albert Picot, (1888–1966), Jurist, State Councillor. Buried in Founex.
- Hélène Grégoire (1904–1998), French writer, died in Founex.
- Sir John B. Adams, (1920–1984) Particle physicist, Director of CERN (1976–1981) and interim director (1960–1961) born in Kingston, Surrey (England) educated in Eltham College, resident in Founex
