= Gingins =

- Municipality
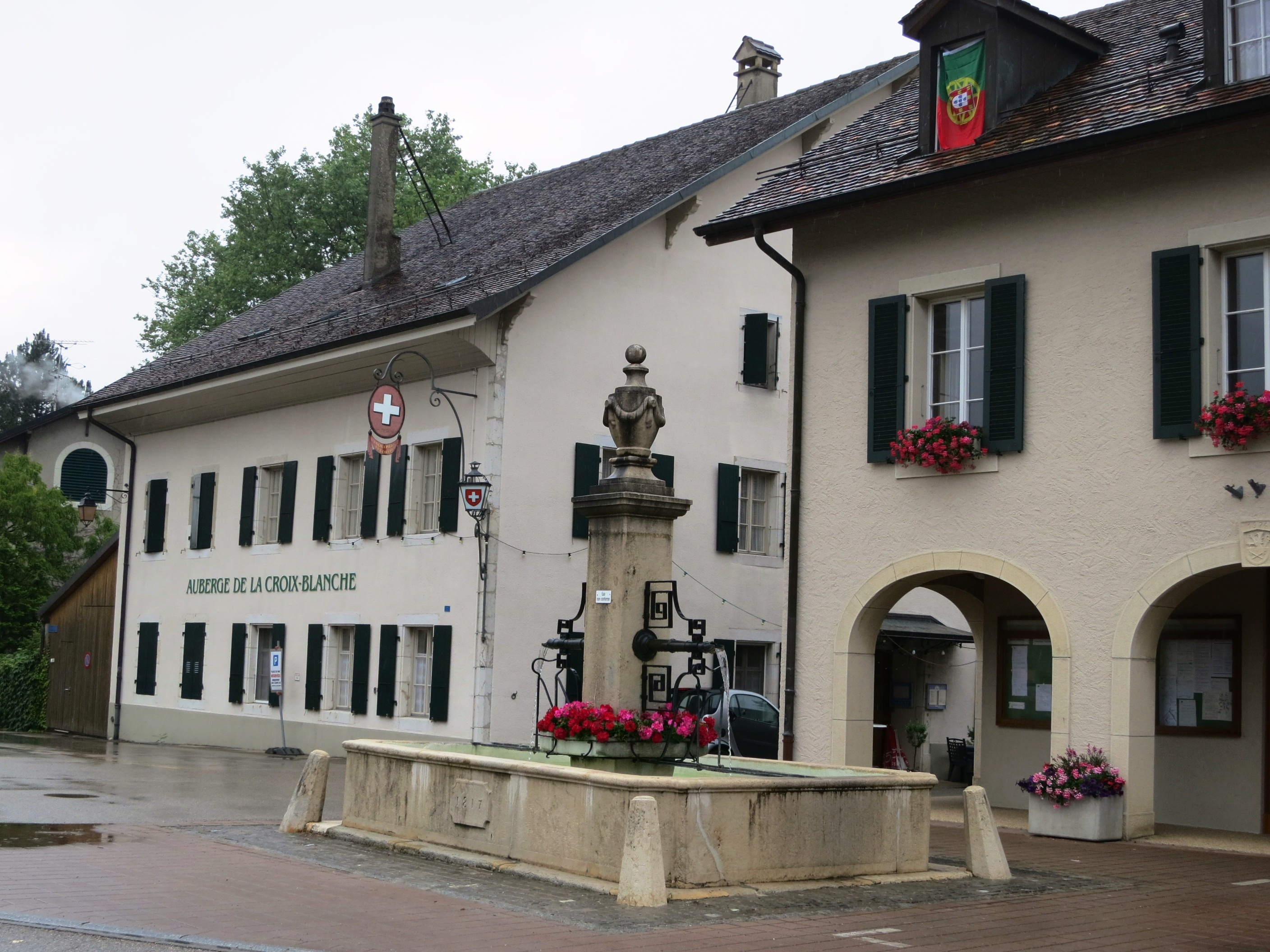

- Flag Coat of arms
- Location of Gingins
- Location within Switzerland Location within Canton of Vaud
- Coordinates: 46°25′N 6°11′E
- Country: Switzerland
- Canton: Vaud
- District: Nyon

Government
  - Mayor: Syndic

Area
  - Total: 12.58 km^{2} (4.86 sq mi)
- Elevation: 542 m (1,778 ft)

Population (2003)
  - Total: 1,008
  - Density: 80.13/km^{2} (207.5/sq mi)
- Time zone: UTC+01:00 (CET)
  - Summer (DST): UTC+02:00 (CEST)
- Postal code: 1276
- SFOS number: 5719
- ISO 3166 code: CH-VD
- Surrounded by: Chéserex, Grens, La Rippe, Prémanon (FR-39), Saint-Cergue, Trélex
- Website: www.gingins.ch

Gingins is a municipality in the district of Nyon in the canton of Vaud in Switzerland.

== History ==
Gingins is first mentioned around 1144–59 as Gingins. In October 1535, a major battle was fought in that locality between the forces of the Republic of Geneva and Charles III, Duke of Savoy, which ended in the latter's defeat.

== Geography ==
Gingins has an area, as of 2009, of 12.6 square kilometers (4.9 mi^{2}). Of this area, 4.32 km^{2} (1.67 mi^{2}) or 34.3% is used for agricultural purposes, while 7.38 km^{2} (2.85 mi^{2}) or 58.7% is forested. Of the rest of the land, 0.79 km^{2} (0.31 mi^{2}) or 6.3% is settled (buildings or roads) and 0.09 km^{2} (22 acres) or 0.7% is unproductive land.

Of the built up area, housing and buildings made up 4.2% and transportation infrastructure made up 1.3%. Out of the forested land, 53.8% of the total land area is heavily forested and 4.8% is covered with orchards or small clusters of trees. Of the agricultural land, 11.6% is used for growing crops and 4.7% is pastures and 17.5% is used for alpine pastures.

The municipality was part of the Nyon District until it was dissolved on 31 August 2006, and Gingins became part of the new district of Nyon.

The municipality is located at the foot of the Jura Mountains, along the Nyon-La Dôle road.

== Coat of arms ==
The blazon of the municipal coat of arms is Per fess, 1. Argent, seme of billets Sable, a semi-lion naissant Sable langued Gules; 2. Gules, two Halbards in saltire Argent. The upper half of the coat of arms, which is present on a number of coats of arms in the region, come from the Gingins family who ruled over the village and the surroundings for almost six centuries."

== Demographics ==
Gingins has a population (as of December 2020) of 1,252. As of 2008, 28.2% of the population are resident foreign nationals. Over the last 10 years (1999–2009 ) the population has changed at a rate of 11.1%. It has changed at a rate of 7.3% due to migration and at a rate of 5% due to births and deaths.

Most of the population (as of 2000) speaks French (797 or 76.9%), with English being second most common (114 or 11.0%) and German being third (78 or 7.5%). There are 10 people who speak Italian and 1 person who speaks Romansh.

The age distribution, as of 2009, in Gingins is; 144 children or 12.9% of the population are between 0 and 9 years old and 144 teenagers or 12.9% are between 10 and 19. Of the adult population, 100 people or 9.0% of the population are between 20 and 29 years old. 129 people or 11.6% are between 30 and 39, 192 people or 17.3% are between 40 and 49, and 158 people or 14.2% are between 50 and 59. The senior population distribution is 150 people or 13.5% of the population are between 60 and 69 years old, 57 people or 5.1% are between 70 and 79, there are 33 people or 3.0% who are between 80 and 89, and there are 5 people or 0.4% who are 90 and older.

As of 2000, there were 398 people who were single and never married in the municipality. There were 551 married individuals, 33 widows or widowers and 55 individuals who are divorced.

As of 2000, there were 395 private households in the municipality, and an average of 2.5 persons per household. There were 95 households that consist of only one person and 27 households with five or more people. Out of a total of 409 households that answered this question, 23.2% were households made up of just one person and there was 1 adult who lived with their parents. Of the rest of the households, there are 122 married couples without children, 154 married couples with children There were 19 single parents with a child or children. There were 4 households that were made up of unrelated people and 14 households that were made up of some sort of institution or another collective housing.

In 2000 there were 218 single family homes (or 71.7% of the total) out of a total of 304 inhabited buildings. There were 48 multi-family buildings (15.8%), along with 27 multi-purpose buildings that were mostly used for housing (8.9%) and 11 other use buildings (commercial or industrial) that also had some housing (3.6%).

In 2000, a total of 351 apartments (81.4% of the total) were permanently occupied, while 65 apartments (15.1%) were seasonally occupied and 15 apartments (3.5%) were empty. As of 2009, the construction rate of new housing units was 0 new units per 1000 residents. The vacancy rate for the municipality, in 2010, was 0%.

The historical population is given in the following chart:

== Politics ==
In the 2007 federal election the most popular party was the UDC which received 25.78% of the vote. The next three most popular parties were the SP (17.82%), the LPS Party (17.5%) and the Green Party (12.08%). In the federal election, a total of 275 votes were cast, and the voter turnout was 43.6%.

== Economy ==
As of 2010, Gingins had an unemployment rate of 4.3%. As of 2008, there were 33 people employed in the primary economic sector and about 12 businesses involved in this sector. 75 people were employed in the secondary sector and there were 11 businesses in this sector. 116 people were employed in the tertiary sector, with 35 businesses in this sector. There were 549 residents of the municipality who were employed in some capacity, of which females made up 44.1% of the workforce.

In 2008 the total number of full-time equivalent jobs was 200. The number of jobs in the primary sector was 25, of which 22 were in agriculture and 3 were in forestry or lumber production. The number of jobs in the secondary sector was 72 of which 54 or (75.0%) were in manufacturing and 18 (25.0%) were in construction. The number of jobs in the tertiary sector was 103. In the tertiary sector; 32 or 31.1% were in wholesale or retail sales or the repair of motor vehicles, 7 or 6.8% were in the movement and storage of goods, 22 or 21.4% were in a hotel or restaurant, 2 or 1.9% were in the information industry, 1 was the insurance or financial industry, 7 or 6.8% were technical professionals or scientists, 11 or 10.7% were in education.

In 2000, there were 158 workers who commuted into the municipality and 425 workers who commuted away. The municipality is a net exporter of workers, with about 2.7 workers leaving the municipality for every one entering. About 18.4% of the workforce coming into Gingins are coming from outside Switzerland. Of the working population, 9.8% used public transportation to get to work, and 71.4% used a private car.

== Religion ==
From the 2000 census, 311 or 30.0% were Roman Catholic, while 425 or 41.0% belonged to the Swiss Reformed Church. Of the rest of the population, there were 7 members of an Orthodox church (or about 0.68% of the population), there was 1 individual who belongs to the Christian Catholic Church, and there were 46 individuals (or about 4.44% of the population) who belonged to another Christian church. There was 1 individual who was Jewish, and 7 (or about 0.68% of the population) who were Islamic. There were 2 individuals who were Buddhist, 1 person who was Hindu and 1 individual who belonged to another church. 209 (or about 20.15% of the population) belonged to no church, are agnostic or atheist, and 44 individuals (or about 4.24% of the population) did not answer the question.

== Education ==
In Gingins about 348 or (33.6%) of the population have completed non-mandatory upper secondary education, and 266 or (25.7%) have completed additional higher education (either university or a Fachhochschule). Of the 266 who completed tertiary schooling, 35.3% were Swiss men, 30.1% were Swiss women, 20.7% were non-Swiss men and 13.9% were non-Swiss women.

In the 2009/2010 school year there were a total of 128 students in the Gingins school district. In the Vaud cantonal school system, two years of non-obligatory pre-school are provided by the political districts. During the school year, the political district provided pre-school care for a total of 1,249 children of which 563 children (45.1%) received subsidized pre-school care. The canton's primary school program requires students to attend for four years. There were 78 students in the municipal primary school program. The obligatory lower secondary school program lasts for six years and there were 50 students in those schools.

As of 2000, there were 17 students in Gingins who came from another municipality, while 160 residents attended schools outside the municipality.
