= La Rippe =

- Municipality
- Flag Coat of arms
- Location of La Rippe
- Location within Switzerland Location within Canton of Vaud
- Coordinates: 46°23′N 6°9′E
- Country: Switzerland
- Canton: Vaud
- District: Nyon

Government
  - Mayor: Syndic

Area
  - Total: 16.61 km^{2} (6.41 sq mi)
- Elevation: 528 m (1,732 ft)

Population (2003)
  - Total: 947
  - Density: 57.0/km^{2} (148/sq mi)
- Time zone: UTC+01:00 (CET)
  - Summer (DST): UTC+02:00 (CEST)
- Postal code: 1278
- SFOS number: 5726
- ISO 3166 code: CH-VD
- Surrounded by: Chéserex, Crassier, Divonne-les-Bains (FR-01), Gingins, Prémanon (FR-39)
- Website: www.larippe.ch

La Rippe is a municipality in the district of Nyon in the canton of Vaud in Switzerland.

== History ==
La Rippe is first mentioned in 1384 as Rippis.

== Geography ==
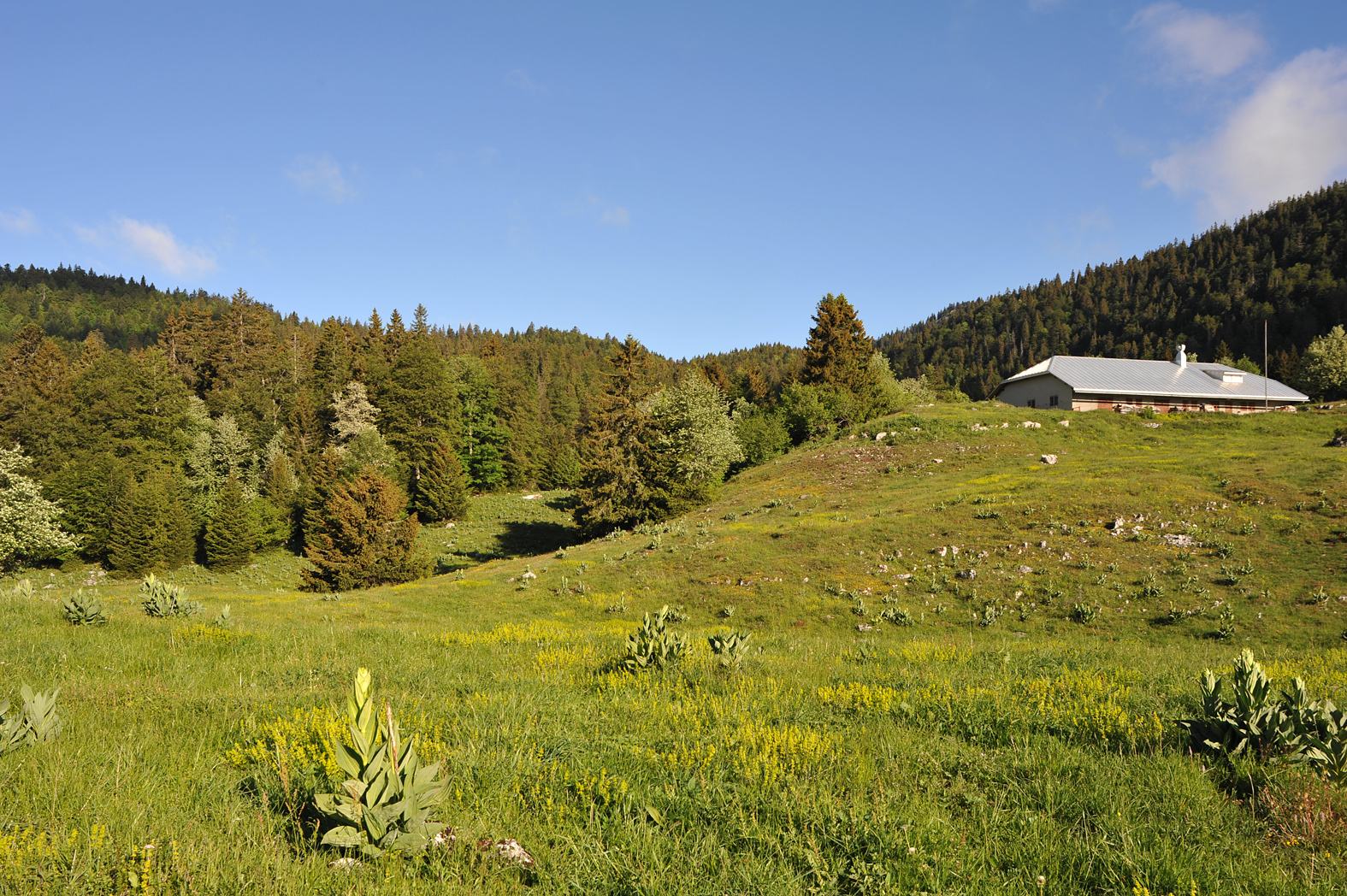
French-Swiss border above La Rippe

La Rippe has an area, as of 2009, of 16.6 square kilometers (6.4 mi^{2}). Of this area, 5.91 km^{2} (2.28 mi^{2}) or 35.6% is used for agricultural purposes, while 10 km^{2} (3.9 mi^{2}) or 60.2% is forested. Of the rest of the land, 0.6 km^{2} (0.23 mi^{2}) or 3.6% is settled (buildings or roads) and 0.09 km^{2} (22 acres) or 0.5% is unproductive land.

Of the built up area, housing and buildings made up 1.7% and transportation infrastructure made up 1.4%. Out of the forested land, 56.7% of the total land area is heavily forested and 3.6% is covered with orchards or small clusters of trees. Of the agricultural land, 14.3% is used for growing crops and 2.4% is pastures and 18.8% is used for alpine pastures.

The municipality was part of the Nyon District until it was dissolved on 31 August 2006, and La Rippe became part of the new district of Nyon.

The municipality is located at the foot of Dôle mountain, on the border with France. It consists of the village of La Rippe and the hamlet of Tranchepied.

== Coat of arms ==
The blazon of the municipal coat of arms is Gules, a Coupeaux Or, two Keys crossed in saltire Argent under a Mitre of the second.

== Demographics ==
La Rippe has a population (as of December 2020) of 1,137. As of 2008, 25.7% of the population are resident foreign nationals. Over the last 10 years (1999–2009 ) the population has changed at a rate of 11.2%. It has changed at a rate of 2.7% due to migration and at a rate of 8.5% due to births and deaths. Most of the population (as of 2000) speaks French (776 or 76.8%), with English being second most common (115 or 11.4%) and German being third (73 or 7.2%). There are 4 people who speak Italian.

The age distribution, as of 2009, in La Rippe is; 139 children or 13.3% of the population are between 0 and 9 years old and 166 teenagers or 15.9% are between 10 and 19. Of the adult population, 95 people or 9.1% of the population are between 20 and 29 years old. 128 people or 12.2% are between 30 and 39, 211 people or 20.2% are between 40 and 49, and 139 people or 13.3% are between 50 and 59. The senior population distribution is 96 people or 9.2% of the population are between 60 and 69 years old, 44 people or 4.2% are between 70 and 79, there are 25 people or 2.4% who are between 80 and 89, and there are 2 people or 0.2% who are 90 and older.

As of 2000, there were 425 people who were single and never married in the municipality. There were 514 married individuals, 16 widows or widowers and 55 individuals who are divorced.

As of 2000, there were 389 private households in the municipality, and an average of 2.5 persons per household. There were 101 households that consist of only one person and 25 households with five or more people. Out of a total of 393 households that answered this question, 25.7% were households made up of just one person. Of the rest of the households, there are 108 married couples without children, 158 married couples with children There were 17 single parents with a child or children. There were 5 households that were made up of unrelated people and 4 households that were made up of some sort of institution or another collective housing.

In 2000 there were 145 single family homes (or 63.0% of the total) out of a total of 230 inhabited buildings. There were 49 multi-family buildings (21.3%), along with 27 multi-purpose buildings that were mostly used for housing (11.7%) and 9 other use buildings (commercial or industrial) that also had some housing (3.9%).

In 2000, a total of 371 apartments (93.5% of the total) were permanently occupied, while 20 apartments (5.0%) were seasonally occupied and 6 apartments (1.5%) were empty. As of 2009, the construction rate of new housing units was 1.9 new units per 1000 residents. The vacancy rate for the municipality, in 2010, was 0%.

The historical population is given in the following chart:

== Politics ==
In the 2007 federal election the most popular party was the FDP which received 19.73% of the vote. The next three most popular parties were the LPS Party (17.45%), the SVP (16.01%) and the SP (15.94%). In the federal election, a total of 231 votes were cast, and the voter turnout was 42.2%.

== Economy ==
As of 2010, La Rippe had an unemployment rate of 2.9%. As of 2008, there were 34 people employed in the primary economic sector and about 13 businesses involved in this sector. 20 people were employed in the secondary sector and there were 2 businesses in this sector. 58 people were employed in the tertiary sector, with 22 businesses in this sector. There were 553 residents of the municipality who were employed in some capacity, of which females made up 44.3% of the workforce.

In 2008 the total number of full-time equivalent jobs was 93. The number of jobs in the primary sector was 28, all of which were in agriculture. The number of jobs in the secondary sector was 20 of which 17 or (85.0%) were in manufacturing and 3 (15.0%) were in construction. The number of jobs in the tertiary sector was 45. In the tertiary sector; 8 or 17.8% were in wholesale or retail sales or the repair of motor vehicles, 1 was in the movement and storage of goods, 5 or 11.1% were in a hotel or restaurant, 2 or 4.4% were in the information industry, 3 or 6.7% were the insurance or financial industry, 3 or 6.7% were technical professionals or scientists, 5 or 11.1% were in education.

In 2000, there were 49 workers who commuted into the municipality and 451 workers who commuted away. The municipality is a net exporter of workers, with about 9.2 workers leaving the municipality for every one entering. About 24.5% of the workforce coming into La Rippe are coming from outside Switzerland, while 0.2% of the locals commute out of Switzerland for work. Of the working population, 8.3% used public transportation to get to work, and 73.6% used a private car.

== Religion ==
From the 2000 census, 317 or 31.4% were Roman Catholic, while 347 or 34.4% belonged to the Swiss Reformed Church. Of the rest of the population, there were 4 members of an Orthodox church (or about 0.40% of the population), there was 1 individual who belongs to the Christian Catholic Church, and there were 73 individuals (or about 7.23% of the population) who belonged to another Christian church. There was 1 individual who was Jewish, and 10 (or about 0.99% of the population) who were Islamic. There were 3 individuals who were Buddhist and 1 individual who belonged to another church. 258 (or about 25.54% of the population) belonged to no church, are agnostic or atheist, and 27 individuals (or about 2.67% of the population) did not answer the question.

== Education ==
In La Rippe about 341 or (33.8%) of the population have completed non-mandatory upper secondary education, and 265 or (26.2%) have completed additional higher education (either university or a Fachhochschule). Of the 265 who completed tertiary schooling, 40.4% were Swiss men, 21.9% were Swiss women, 19.2% were non-Swiss men and 18.5% were non-Swiss women.

In the 2009/2010 school year there were a total of 130 students in the La Rippe school district. In the Vaud cantonal school system, two years of non-obligatory pre-school are provided by the political districts. During the school year, the political district provided pre-school care for a total of 1,249 children of which 563 children (45.1%) received subsidized pre-school care. The canton's primary school program requires students to attend for four years. There were 74 students in the municipal primary school program. The obligatory lower secondary school program lasts for six years and there were 56 students in those schools.

As of 2000, there were 3 students in La Rippe who came from another municipality, while 152 residents attended schools outside the municipality.
