= Chavannes-de-Bogis =

- Municipality
- Flag Coat of arms
- Location of Chavannes-de-Bogis
- Location within Switzerland Location within Canton of Vaud
- Coordinates: 46°21′N 6°10′E
- Country: Switzerland
- Canton: Vaud
- District: Nyon

Government
  - Mayor: Syndic; Alain Barraud (2016-2021)

Area
  - Total: 2.85 km^{2} (1.10 sq mi)
- Elevation: 476 m (1,562 ft)

Population (2015)
  - Total: 1,290
  - Density: 453/km^{2} (1,170/sq mi)
- Time zone: UTC+01:00 (CET)
  - Summer (DST): UTC+02:00 (CEST)
- Postal code: 1279
- SFOS number: 5707
- ISO 3166 code: CH-VD
- Surrounded by: Bogis-Bossey, Céligny (GE), Commugny, Divonne-les-Bains (FR-01), Founex
- Website: www.chavannes-de-bogis.ch

Chavannes-de-Bogis is a municipality in the district of Nyon in the canton of Vaud in Switzerland.

== History ==
Chavannes-de-Bogis is first mentioned around 1477-85 as Cabane de Bogiez.

== Geography ==
Chavannes-de-Bogis has an area, as of 2009, of 2.9 square kilometers (1.1 mi^{2}). Of this area, 1.67 km^{2} (0.64 mi^{2}) or 58.6% is used for agricultural purposes, while 0.35 km^{2} (0.14 mi^{2}) or 12.3% is forested. Of the rest of the land, 0.69 km^{2} (0.27 mi^{2}) or 24.2% is settled (buildings or roads), 0.01 km^{2} (2.5 acres) or 0.4% is either rivers or lakes and 0.15 km^{2} (37 acres) or 5.3% is unproductive land.

Of the built up area, industrial buildings made up 2.1% of the total area while housing and buildings made up 9.5% and transportation infrastructure made up 12.3%. Out of the forested land, all of the forested land area is covered with heavy forests. Of the agricultural land, 49.5% is used for growing crops and 9.1% is pastures. All the water in the municipality is flowing water.

The municipality was part of the Nyon District until it was dissolved on 31 August 2006, and Chavannes-de-Bogis became part of the new district of Nyon.

Chavannes de Bogis is a border crossing point from France (Divonnes les Bains) and as such forms a major traffic artery during rush hours. Chavannes is an agricultural village, there's a mixture of farmers (cereals) and vineyards, there are also several stables and a couple of bee keepers. It consists of the village of Chavannes-de-Bogis and the hamlet of Péguey.

== Coat of arms ==
The blazon of the municipal coat of arms is Gules, a Bar wavy Argent, in chief two crossed Keys in saltire of the same, in base a triple Mount Or.

== Demographics ==
Chavannes-de-Bogis has a population (as of December 2020) of 1,341. As of 2008, 39.1% of the population are resident foreign nationals.

Most of the population (as of 2000) speaks French (755 or 72.0%), with English being second most common (132 or 12.6%) and German being third (74 or 7.1%). There are 20 people who speak Italian.

The age distribution, as of 2015, in Chavannes-de-Bogis is; 279 children or 21.6% of the population. Adult population is 1011 people, 49% being men and 51% being women.

As of 2000, there were 346 private households in the municipality, and an average of 3. persons per household. There were 58 households that consist of only one person and 46 households with five or more people. Out of a total of 350 households that answered this question, 16.6% were households made up of just one person and there was 1 adult who lived with their parents. Of the rest of the households, there are 74 married couples without children, 186 married couples with children There were 22 single parents with a child or children. There were 5 households that were made up of unrelated people and 4 households that were made up of some sort of institution or another collective housing.

In 2000 there were 241 single family homes (or 82.8% of the total) out of a total of 291 inhabited buildings. There were 31 multi-family buildings (10.7%), along with 13 multi-purpose buildings that were mostly used for housing (4.5%) and 6 other use buildings (commercial or industrial) that also had some housing (2.1%).

In 2000, a total of 337 apartments (90.6% of the total) were permanently occupied, while 30 apartments (8.1%) were seasonally occupied and 5 apartments (1.3%) were empty. As of 2009, the construction rate of new housing units was 0 new units per 1000 residents. The vacancy rate for the municipality, in 2010, was 1.32%.

The historical population is given in the following chart:

== Politics ==
In the 2007 federal election the most popular party was the SVP which received 31.96% of the vote. The next three most popular parties were the LPS Party (15.59%), the FDP (14.01%) and the SP (11.36%). In the federal election, a total of 182 votes were cast, and the voter turnout was 34.7%.

== Economy ==
As of 2010, Chavannes-de-Bogis had an unemployment rate of 2.3%. As of 2008, there were 18 people employed in the primary economic sector and about 8 businesses involved in this sector. 67 people were employed in the secondary sector and there were 8 businesses in this sector. 1,378 people were employed in the tertiary sector, with 91 businesses in this sector. There were 540 residents of the municipality who were employed in some capacity, of which females made up 42.2% of the workforce.

In 2008 the total number of full-time equivalent jobs was 1,207. The number of jobs in the primary sector was 14, all of which were in agriculture. The number of jobs in the secondary sector was 64 of which 10 or (15.6%) were in manufacturing and 54 (84.4%) were in construction. The number of jobs in the tertiary sector was 1,129. In the tertiary sector; 819 or 72.5% were in wholesale or retail sales or the repair of motor vehicles, 7 or 0.6% were in the movement and storage of goods, 69 or 6.1% were in a hotel or restaurant, 93 or 8.2% were in the information industry, 39 or 3.5% were technical professionals or scientists, 17 or 1.5% were in education.

In 2000, there were 897 workers who commuted into the municipality and 440 workers who commuted away. The municipality is a net importer of workers, with about 2.0 workers entering the municipality for every one leaving. About 28.3% of the workforce coming into Chavannes-de-Bogis are coming from outside Switzerland, while 0.2% of the locals commute out of Switzerland for work. Of the working population, 7.8% used public transportation to get to work, and 75.7% used a private car.

== Religion ==
From the 2000 census, 387 or 36.9% were Roman Catholic, while 300 or 28.6% belonged to the Swiss Reformed Church. Of the rest of the population, there were 10 members of an Orthodox church (or about 0.95% of the population), and there were 16 individuals (or about 1.53% of the population) who belonged to another Christian church. There were 9 individuals (or about 0.86% of the population) who were Jewish, and 28 (or about 2.67% of the population) who were Islamic. There were 3 individuals who were Buddhist and 2 individuals who were Hindu. 269 (or about 25.67% of the population) belonged to no church, are agnostic or atheist, and 29 individuals (or about 2.77% of the population) did not answer the question.

== Education ==
In Chavannes-de-Bogis about 293 or (28.0%) of the population have completed non-mandatory upper secondary education, and 298 or (28.4%) have completed additional higher education (either university or a Fachhochschule). Of the 298 who completed tertiary schooling, 30.2% were Swiss men, 28.5% were Swiss women, 24.2% were non-Swiss men and 17.1% were non-Swiss women.

In the 2009/2010 school year there were a total of 101 students in the Chavannes-de-Bogis school district. In the Vaud cantonal school system, two years of non-obligatory pre-school are provided by the political districts. During the school year, the political district provided pre-school care for a total of 1,249 children of which 563 children (45.1%) received subsidized pre-school care. The canton's primary school program requires students to attend for four years. There were 46 students in the municipal primary school program. The obligatory lower secondary school program lasts for six years and there were 55 students in those schools.

As of 2000, there were 74 students in Chavannes-de-Bogis who came from another municipality, while 212 residents attended schools outside the municipality.
