= Céligny =

- Municipality
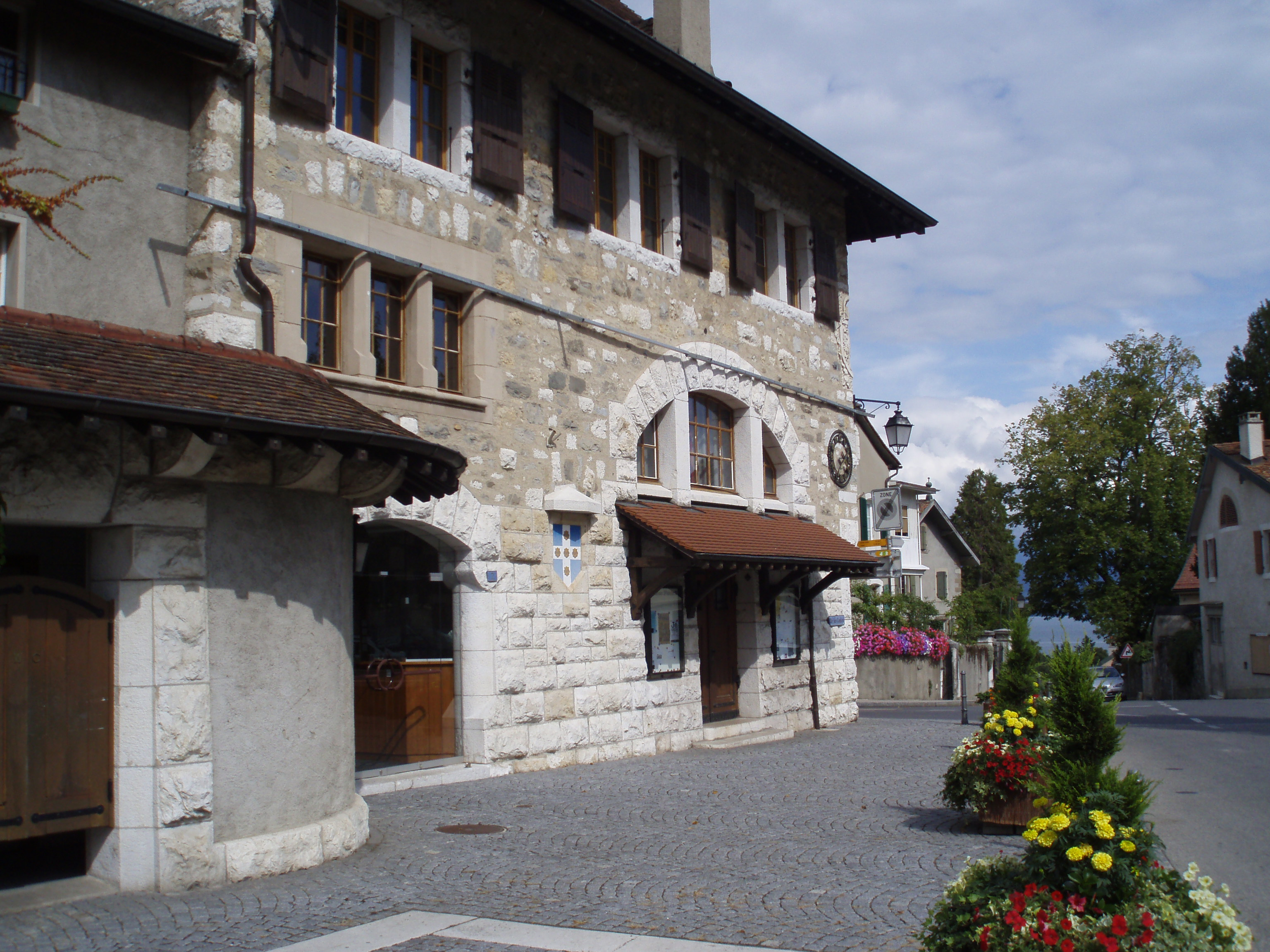

- Flag Coat of arms
- Location of Céligny
- Location within Switzerland Location within Canton of Geneva
- Coordinates: 46°21′10″N 6°11′28″E
- Country: Switzerland
- Canton: Geneva
- District: n.a.

Government
  - Mayor: Maire; Marie-Béatrice Mériboute

Area
  - Total: 4.65 km^{2} (1.80 sq mi)
- Elevation: 434 m (1,424 ft)

Population (December 2020)
  - Total: 792
  - Density: 170/km^{2} (441/sq mi)
- Time zone: UTC+01:00 (CET)
  - Summer (DST): UTC+02:00 (CEST)
- Postal code: 1298
- SFOS number: 6610
- ISO 3166 code: CH-GE
- Surrounded by: Arnex-sur-Nyon (VD), Bogis-Bossey (VD), Chavannes-de-Bogis (VD), Crans-près-Céligny (VD), Founex (VD)
- Website: www.celigny.ch

Céligny (French pronunciation: [seliɲi]) is a municipality in the canton of Geneva, Switzerland. It consists of two small exclaves of the canton of Geneva surrounded by the canton of Vaud, near Crans-près-Céligny. It is on Lake Geneva.

== History ==
Céligny is first mentioned in 1163 as Siliniacum.

== Geography ==
Céligny has an area, as of 2009, of 4.65 square kilometers (1.80 sq mi). Of this area, 3.03 km^{2} (1.17 sq mi) or 65.2% is used for agricultural purposes, while 0.91 km^{2} (0.35 sq mi) or 19.6% is forested. Of the rest of the land, 0.75 km^{2} (0.29 sq mi) or 16.1% is settled (buildings or roads) and 0.01 km^{2} (2.5 acres) or 0.2% is unproductive land.

Of the built up area, housing and buildings made up 11.0% and transportation infrastructure made up 4.9%. Out of the forested land, 15.1% of the total land area is heavily forested and 4.5% is covered with orchards or small clusters of trees. Of the agricultural land, 51.8% is used for growing crops and 11.0% is pastures, while 2.4% is used for orchards or vine crops.

The municipality consists of two disconnected territories of the Canton of Geneva. The smaller one contains the settlements of La Grande Coudre and La Petite Coudre and is entirely surrounded by the Canton of Vaud; it is thus both an exclave and an enclave. The larger one consists of the village of Céligny on a hill above Lake Geneva along with the small Le Brassus valley; being adjacent to a part of Lake Geneva belonging to the Canton of Geneva but not to the municipality of Celigny, it is thus by itself neither an exclave nor an enclave. However, together with this adjacent part of the lake, it does constitute an exclave of the Canton (but still not an enclave).

The municipality of Céligny consists of the sub-sections or villages of Les Bondex, Murat, Céligny - lac, Céligny - village and Les Coudres.

== Notable residents ==
- Royalist journalist and thinker Jacques Mallet du Pan, (1749–1800), was born in Céligny.
- Louis François Senn, (1799–1873), Doctor of Medicine and Surgery, politician. Deputy to the Grand Council (1846–1848) and (1855–1856). Head surgeon at Geneva hospital. Member of the Committee of the Geneva Conservatory of Music (1849–1860). Owner of the Belle-Ferme estate in Céligny. Buried in Founex.
- The notable Italian economist Vilfredo Pareto, (1848–1923), father of the 80/20 theory and Paretos Optimatality, lived in Céligny, earning him the epithet of "hermit of Céligny". He died on 19 August 1923 in Céligny and was buried in the small Céligny cemetery without fanfare on 23 August 1923. The engraving on his tombstone simply states Vil-Fredo Pareto.
- Two notable British residents were the actor Richard Burton, (1925–1984), and novelist Alistair MacLean (1922–1987) who are both buried there. Hjördis Genberg, (1919–1997), a supermodel and widow of David Niven, died in the town in 1997.

== Demographics ==
Céligny has a population (as of December 2020) of 792. As of 2008, 30.8% of the population are resident foreign nationals. Over the last 10 years (1999–2009) the population has changed at a rate of 5.3%. It has changed at a rate of 3.4% due to migration and at a rate of 5.2% due to births and deaths.

Most of the population (as of 2000) speaks French (487 or 81.3%), with German being second most common (38 or 6.3%) and English being third (36 or 6.0%).

As of 2008, the gender distribution of the population was 48.6% male and 51.4% female. The population was made up of 218 Swiss men (33.0% of the population) and 103 (15.6%) non-Swiss men. There were 238 Swiss women (36.1%) and 101 (15.3%) non-Swiss women. Of the population in the municipality 127 or about 21.2% were born in Céligny and lived there in 2000. There were 113 or 18.9% who were born in the same canton, while 176 or 29.4% were born somewhere else in Switzerland, and 164 or 27.4% were born outside of Switzerland.

In 2008 there were 3 live births to Swiss citizens and 2 births to non-Swiss citizens, and in same time span there were 5 deaths of Swiss citizens. Ignoring immigration and emigration, the population of Swiss citizens decreased by 2 while the foreign population increased by 2. There were 2 Swiss men and 3 Swiss women who emigrated from Switzerland. At the same time, there were 9 non-Swiss men and 6 non-Swiss women who immigrated from another country to Switzerland. The total Swiss population change in 2008 (from all sources, including moves across municipal borders) was an increase of 4 and the non-Swiss population increased by 12 people. This represents a population growth rate of 2.5%.

The age distribution of the population (as of 2000) is children and teenagers (0–19 years old) make up 28% of the population, while adults (20–64 years old) make up 58.3% and seniors (over 64 years old) make up 13.7%.

As of 2000, there were 254 people who were single and never married in the municipality. There were 283 married individuals, 25 widows or widowers and 37 individuals who are divorced.

As of 2000, there were 234 private households in the municipality, and an average of 2.5 persons per household. There were 77 households that consist of only one person and 20 households with five or more people. Out of a total of 246 households that answered this question, 31.3% were households made up of just one person and there were 1 adults who lived with their parents. Of the rest of the households, there are 46 married couples without children, 87 married couples with children There were 20 single parents with a child or children. There were 3 households that were made up of unrelated people and 12 households that were made up of some sort of institution or another collective housing.

In 2000 there were 101 single family homes (or 60.5% of the total) out of a total of 167 inhabited buildings. There were 29 multi-family buildings (17.4%), along with 23 multi-purpose buildings that were mostly used for housing (13.8%) and 14 other use buildings (commercial or industrial) that also had some housing (8.4%). Of the single family homes 48 were built before 1919, while 4 were built between 1990 and 2000.

In 2000 there were 269 apartments in the municipality. The most common apartment size was 4 rooms of which there were 59. There were 15 single room apartments and 111 apartments with five or more rooms. Of these apartments, a total of 223 apartments (82.9% of the total) were permanently occupied, while 33 apartments (12.3%) were seasonally occupied and 13 apartments (4.8%) were empty. As of 2009, the construction rate of new housing units was 3 new units per 1000 residents. The vacancy rate for the municipality, in 2010, was 0%.

The historical population is given in the following chart:

== Heritage sites of national significance ==
The Domaine De Garengo and the Domaine de l’Élysée are listed as Swiss heritage site of national significance. The entire village of Céligny is part of the Inventory of Swiss Heritage Sites.

== Politics ==
In the 2007 federal election the most popular party was the LPS Party which received 25.87% of the vote. The next three most popular parties were the SVP (18.03%), the Green Party (17.58%) and the SP (14.22%). In the federal election, a total of 167 votes were cast, and the voter turnout was 48.4%.

In the 2009 Grand Conseil election, there were a total of 335 registered voters of which 138 (41.2%) voted. The most popular party in the municipality for this election was the Libéral with 29.6% of the ballots. In the canton-wide election they received the highest proportion of votes. The second most popular party was the Les Verts (with 18.5%), they were also second in the canton-wide election, while the third most popular party was the Les Socialistes (with 8.9%), they were fourth in the canton-wide election.

For the 2009 Conseil d'État election, there were a total of 341 registered voters of which 156 (45.7%) voted.

In 2011, all the municipalities held local elections, and in Céligny there were 11 spots open on the municipal council. There were a total of 406 registered voters of which 211 (52.0%) voted. Out of the 211 votes, there were 1 blank votes, 1 null or unreadable votes and 8 votes with a name that was not on the list.

== Economy ==
As of 2010, Céligny had an unemployment rate of 3%. As of 2008, there were 17 people employed in the primary economic sector and about 6 businesses involved in this sector. 3 people were employed in the secondary sector and there were 3 businesses in this sector. 39 people were employed in the tertiary sector, with 14 businesses in this sector. There were 274 residents of the municipality who were employed in some capacity, of which females made up 43.1% of the workforce.

In 2008 the total number of full-time equivalent jobs was 51. The number of jobs in the primary sector was 16, of which 14 were in agriculture and 1 was in fishing or fisheries. The number of jobs in the secondary sector was 3 of which 2 or (66.7%) were in manufacturing and 1 was in construction. The number of jobs in the tertiary sector was 32. In the tertiary sector; 5 or 15.6% were in wholesale or retail sales or the repair of motor vehicles, 1 was in the movement and storage of goods, 17 or 53.1% were in a hotel or restaurant, 4 or 12.5% were in education and 1 was in health care.

In 2000, there were 74 workers who commuted into the municipality and 206 workers who commuted away. The municipality is a net exporter of workers, with about 2.8 workers leaving the municipality for every one entering. About 21.6% of the workforce coming into Céligny are coming from outside Switzerland. Of the working population, 12.4% used public transportation to get to work, and 64.6% used a private car.

== Religion ==
From the 2000 census, 177 or 29.5% were Roman Catholic, while 213 or 35.6% belonged to the Swiss Reformed Church. Of the rest of the population, and there were 14 individuals (or about 2.34% of the population) who belonged to another Christian church. There were 9 (or about 1.50% of the population) who were Islamic. There was 1 person who was Buddhist and 1 individual who belonged to another church. 141 (or about 23.54% of the population) belonged to no church, are agnostic or atheist, and 43 individuals (or about 7.18% of the population) did not answer the question.

== Education ==
In Céligny about 171 or (28.5%) of the population have completed non-mandatory upper secondary education, and 147 or (24.5%) have completed additional higher education (either university or a Fachhochschule). Of the 147 who completed tertiary schooling, 44.2% were Swiss men, 33.3% were Swiss women, 11.6% were non-Swiss men and 10.9% were non-Swiss women.

During the 2009–2010 school year there were a total of 113 students in the Céligny school system. The education system in the Canton of Geneva allows young children to attend two years of non-obligatory kindergarten. During that school year, there was 1 child who was in a pre-kindergarten class. The canton's school system provides two years of non-mandatory kindergarten and requires students to attend six years of primary school, with some of the children attending smaller, specialized classes. In Céligny there were 18 students in kindergarten or primary school and - students were in the special, smaller classes. The secondary school program consists of three lower, obligatory years of schooling, followed by three to five years of optional, advanced schools. There were 18 lower secondary students who attended school in Céligny. There were 19 upper secondary students from the municipality along with 6 students who were in a professional, non-university track program. An additional 15 students attended a private school.

As of 2000, there were 6 students in Céligny who came from another municipality, while 71 residents attended schools outside the municipality.
