= Urbain Olivier =

Swiss writer

Urbain Olivier (1810, Eysins - 1888) was a Swiss writer.

The brother of Juste Olivier, he was well known from 1856 onwards as the author of numerous popular tales of rural life in the Canton of Vaud, especially of the region near Nyon.
