= Trélex =

- Municipality
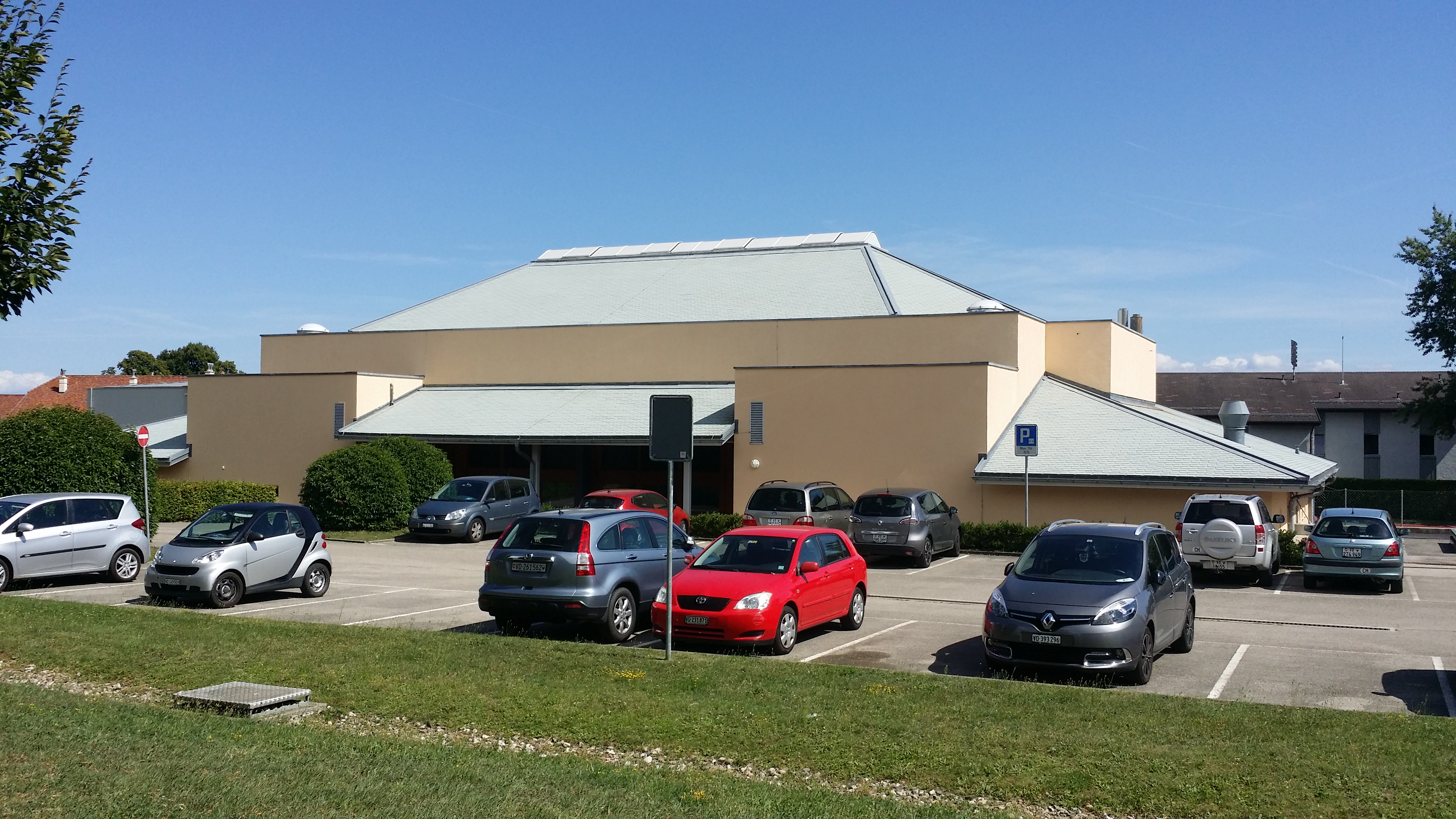

- Flag Coat of arms
- Location of Trélex
- Location within Switzerland Location within Canton of Vaud
- Coordinates: 46°25′N 06°12′E
- Country: Switzerland
- Canton: Vaud
- District: Nyon

Government
  - Mayor: Syndic; M. Antonio Bilardo

Area
  - Total: 5.69 km^{2} (2.20 sq mi)
- Elevation: 508 m (1,667 ft)

Population (2003)
  - Total: 1,129
  - Density: 198/km^{2} (514/sq mi)
- Demonym: Les Trélésiens
- Time zone: UTC+01:00 (CET)
  - Summer (DST): UTC+02:00 (CEST)
- Postal code: 1270
- SFOS number: 5730
- ISO 3166 code: CH-VD
- Surrounded by: Nyon, Duillier, Givrins, Saint-Cergue, Gingins, Grens
- Website: www.trelex.ch

Trélex is a small village in the district of Nyon in the canton of Vaud in Switzerland.

== History ==
Trélex is first mentioned in 1145 as Trailai.

== Geography ==
Trélex has an area, as of 2009, of 5.8 square kilometers (2.2 mi^{2}). Of this area, 3 km^{2} (1.2 mi^{2}) or 51.9% is used for agricultural purposes, while 1.98 km^{2} (0.76 mi^{2}) or 34.3% is forested. Of the rest of the land, 0.86 km^{2} (0.33 mi^{2}) or 14.9% is settled (buildings or roads), 0.01 km^{2} (2.5 acres) or 0.2% is either rivers or lakes.

Of the built up area, housing and buildings made up 8.3% and transportation infrastructure made up 4.3%. Power and water infrastructure as well as other special developed areas made up 2.1% of the area Out of the forested land, 33.0% of the total land area is heavily forested and 1.2% is covered with orchards or small clusters of trees. Of the agricultural land, 46.0% is used for growing crops and 4.3% is pastures, while 1.6% is used for orchards or vine crops. All the water in the municipality is in lakes.

The municipality was part of the Nyon District until it was dissolved on 31 August 2006, and Trélex became part of the new district of Nyon.

The municipality is located at the foot of the Jura Mountains, on the Nyon-Saint-Cergue road.

== Coat of arms ==
The blazon of the municipal coat of arms is Gules, a Winnowing-basket Or.

== Demographics ==
Trélex has a population (as of December 2020) of 1,449. As of 2008, 24.3% of the population are resident foreign nationals. Over the last 10 years (1999–2009) the population has changed at a rate of 22.7%. It has changed at a rate of 15.4% due to migration and at a rate of 7% due to births and deaths.

Most of the population (as of 2000) speaks French (868 or 78.0%), with German being second most common (96 or 8.6%) and English being third (93 or 8.4%). There are 16 people who speak Italian.

The age distribution, as of 2009, in Trélex is; 203 children or 15.1% of the population are between 0 and 9 years old and 228 teenagers or 17.0% are between 10 and 19. Of the adult population, 74 people or 5.5% of the population are between 20 and 29 years old. 160 people or 11.9% are between 30 and 39, 295 people or 21.9% are between 40 and 49, and 154 people or 11.5% are between 50 and 59. The senior population distribution is 139 people or 10.3% of the population are between 60 and 69 years old, 67 people or 5.0% are between 70 and 79, there are 23 people or 1.7% who are between 80 and 89, and there is 1 person who is 90 and older.

As of 2000, there were 446 people who were single and never married in the municipality. There were 596 married individuals, 29 widows or widowers and 42 individuals who are divorced.

As of 2000, there were 397 private households in the municipality, and an average of 2.7 persons per household. There were 77 households that consist of only one person and 37 households with five or more people. Out of a total of 408 households that answered this question, 18.9% were households made up of just one person and there was 1 adult who lived with their parents. Of the rest of the households, there are 127 married couples without children, 174 married couples with children There were 15 single parents with a child or children. There were 3 households that were made up of unrelated people and 11 households that were made up of some sort of institution or another collective housing.

In 2000 there were 267 single family homes (or 75.9% of the total) out of a total of 352 inhabited buildings. There were 43 multi-family buildings (12.2%), along with 33 multi-purpose buildings that were mostly used for housing (9.4%) and 9 other use buildings (commercial or industrial) that also had some housing (2.6%).

In 2000, a total of 386 apartments (86.9% of the total) were permanently occupied, while 52 apartments (11.7%) were seasonally occupied and 6 apartments (1.4%) were empty. As of 2009, the construction rate of new housing units was 4.3 new units per 1000 residents. The vacancy rate for the municipality, in 2010, was 0%.

The historical population is given in the following chart:

== Sights ==
The local church is a distinctive landmark for visitors. Another notable building is the clock tower in the center of the village.

== Politics ==
In the 2007 federal election the most popular party was the SVP which received 20.81% of the vote. The next three most popular parties were the SP (16.27%), the FDP (15.94%) and the Green Party (14.64%). In the federal election, a total of 345 votes were cast, and the voter turnout was 47.7%.

== Economy ==
A bakery, a village shop, a butcher and a post office provide essential services. The village also boasts a restaurant, the Auberge de Trélex. A big shopping center is located a few minutes away by car in Signy-Avenex, with an assortment of services (pharmacy, dry-cleaning, etc.) anchored around one of the biggest Coop supermarkets in the area.

As of 2010, Trélex had an unemployment rate of 2.2%. As of 2008, there were 22 people employed in the primary economic sector and about 11 businesses involved in this sector. 37 people were employed in the secondary sector and there were 7 businesses in this sector. 111 people were employed in the tertiary sector, with 33 businesses in this sector. There were 552 residents of the municipality who were employed in some capacity, of which females made up 39.5% of the workforce.

In 2008 the total number of full-time equivalent jobs was 145. The number of jobs in the primary sector was 18, all of which were in agriculture. The number of jobs in the secondary sector was 36 of which 1 was in manufacturing and 35 (97.2%) were in construction. The number of jobs in the tertiary sector was 91. In the tertiary sector; 17 or 18.7% were in wholesale or retail sales or the repair of motor vehicles, 22 or 24.2% were in the movement and storage of goods, 4 or 4.4% were in a hotel or restaurant, 9 or 9.9% were in the information industry, 11 or 12.1% were technical professionals or scientists, 12 or 13.2% were in education.

In 2000, there were 100 workers who commuted into the municipality and 454 workers who commuted away. The municipality is a net exporter of workers, with about 4.5 workers leaving the municipality for every one entering. About 14.0% of the workforce coming into Trélex are coming from outside Switzerland, while 0.2% of the locals commute out of Switzerland for work. Of the working population, 15% used public transportation to get to work, and 69% used a private car.

== Religion ==
From the 2000 census, 277 or 24.9% were Roman Catholic, while 468 or 42.0% belonged to the Swiss Reformed Church. Of the rest of the population, there were 6 members of an Orthodox church (or about 0.54% of the population), there was 1 individual who belongs to the Christian Catholic Church, and there were 51 individuals (or about 4.58% of the population) who belonged to another Christian church. There were 5 individuals (or about 0.45% of the population) who were Jewish, and 2 (or about 0.18% of the population) who were Islamic. There were 2 individuals who were Buddhist, 5 individuals who were Hindu and 1 individual who belonged to another church. 242 (or about 21.74% of the population) belonged to no church, are agnostic or atheist, and 74 individuals (or about 6.65% of the population) did not answer the question.

== Education ==
In Trélex about 364 or (32.7%) of the population have completed non-mandatory upper secondary education, and 295 or (26.5%) have completed additional higher education (either university or a Fachhochschule). Of the 295 who completed tertiary schooling, 46.8% were Swiss men, 25.1% were Swiss women, 18.0% were non-Swiss men and 10.2% were non-Swiss women.

In the 2009/2010 school year there were a total of 208 students in the Trélex school district. In the Vaud cantonal school system, two years of non-obligatory pre-school are provided by the political districts. During the school year, the political district provided pre-school care for a total of 1,249 children of which 563 children (45.1%) received subsidized pre-school care. The canton's primary school program requires students to attend for four years. There were 112 students in the municipal primary school program. The obligatory lower secondary school program lasts for six years and there were 95 students in those schools. There was also 1 student who was home schooled or attended another non-traditional school.

As of 2000, there were 20 students in Trélex who came from another municipality, while 142 residents attended schools outside the municipality.

== Transportation ==
Trélex is 5 minutes from the motorway exit for Nyon and St-Cergue. It is also accessible by train thanks to the NStCM, connecting Nyon at one end and La Cure at the other end of a windy track running up the Jura. Trains are timed to connect efficiently to Geneva and Lausanne.

== Notable residents ==
- Gaël Monfils, tennis player.
- Michel Mayor, winner of the 2019 Nobel Prize in Physics.
- Gisou van der Goot, Biologist, Marcel Benoist Prize 2009.
