= Arnex =

Arnex may refer to:

- Arnex-sur-Nyon, Vaud, Switzerland
- Arnex-sur-Orbe, Vaud, Switzerland
