= Zyma =

Swiss pharmaceutical company

Zyma was a Swiss pharmaceutical company founded in 1900 in Montreux by Hermann de Pury, a chemist from Neuchâtel.

== History ==
In 1905, Hermann de Pury partnered with Henri Golaz, taking over the company Golaz had founded at Saxon.

After the formation of Zyma, in its early years, the company's shareholders included Ami Chessex and Ernest Chuard.

The company moved to Aigle in 1906, with a subsidiary at Saint-Louis in Alsace, relocated to Nyon in 1917 and then to Prangins in 1920, while keeping its registered office in Nyon. Taken over by Arnold Schenk in 1934, it became the parent company of some fifteen European firms. After launching the Merfen disinfectants in 1937, Zyma was active in dental prophylaxis from 1950. Ciba became its majority shareholder in 1960.

Alongside its specialty in phlebology (Venoruton, 1961), the company concentrated from then on rhinology (Vibrocil, 1963), allergies (Fenistil, 1974), ophthalmology, and dermatology. It became Novartis Consumer Health in 1997 and employed some 400 people at Nyon and Prangins in 2012. Threatened with closure in 2011–2012, the site was ultimately retained.

== Bibliography ==
- H. Rieben et al., Portraits de 250 entreprises vaudoises, 1980, 56–60
- R. Denti, "Zyma SA Nyon", in Reflets: bull. mensuel de la BCV, 1988, no. 7–8, 18–22
