= Dimetindene =

Chemical compound

Clinical data
- Trade names: Fenistil
- AHFS/Drugs.com: International Drug Names
- Routes of administration: Oral, topical
- ATC code: D04AA13 (WHO) R06AB03 (WHO)

Legal status
- Legal status: AU: S4 (Prescription only); UK: General sales list (GSL, OTC)

Identifiers
- IUPAC name: N,N-Dimethyl-2-[3-(1-pyridin-2-ylethyl)-1H-inden-2-yl]ethan-1-amine
- CAS Number: 5636-83-9 3614-69-5
- PubChem CID: 21855
- DrugBank: DB08801
- ChemSpider: 20541
- UNII: 661FH77Z3P
- KEGG: D07853
- ChEMBL: ChEMBL22108
- CompTox Dashboard (EPA): DTXSID9022942
- ECHA InfoCard: 100.024.622

Chemical and physical data
- Formula: C_{20}H_{24}N_{2}
- Molar mass: 292.426 g·mol^{−1}
- 3D model (JSmol): Interactive image
- Chirality: Racemic mixture
- SMILES: n1ccccc1C(C=3c2ccccc2CC=3CCN(C)C)C
- InChI: InChI=1S/C20H24N2/c1-15(19-10-6-7-12-21-19)20-17(11-13-22(2)3)14-16-8-4-5-9-18(16)20/h4-10,12,15H,11,13-14H2,1-3H3; Key:MVMQESMQSYOVGV-UHFFFAOYSA-N

Dimetindene, also sold under the brand name Fenistil, is an antihistamine/anticholinergic. It is a first generation selective H_{1} antagonist. Dimetindene is an atypical first generation H_{1} antagonist as it only minimally passes across the blood–brain barrier, and has no sedating effect after a single dose.

(S)-(+)-dimetindene is also a strong M_{2} receptor antagonist, with this enantiomer being more potent (up to 41-fold) for all muscarinic receptors assayed.

The (R)-(-)-enantiomer is the eutomer regarding the H_{1} receptor ((R)-isomer pA_{2} = 9.42; (S)-isomer pA_{2} = 7.48). (Note: The pA_{2} value is a measure of potency and describes how much antagonist is required such that twice as much agonist is needed for the same response. It is the negative logarithm (base 10) of the molar concentration of the antagonist at this point.)

It was patented in 1958 and came into medical use in 1960.

== Medical use ==
Dimetindene is used orally and topically as an antipruritic. It is used topically to treat skin irritations, such as insect bites. Dimetindene is also administered orally to treat allergies, such as hay fever.

It is commonly formulated as its maleic acid salt, dimethindene maleate.

== Names ==
It is sold under the brand name Fenistil among others.
