= Louis Ruffet =

Swiss Protestant theologian and historian

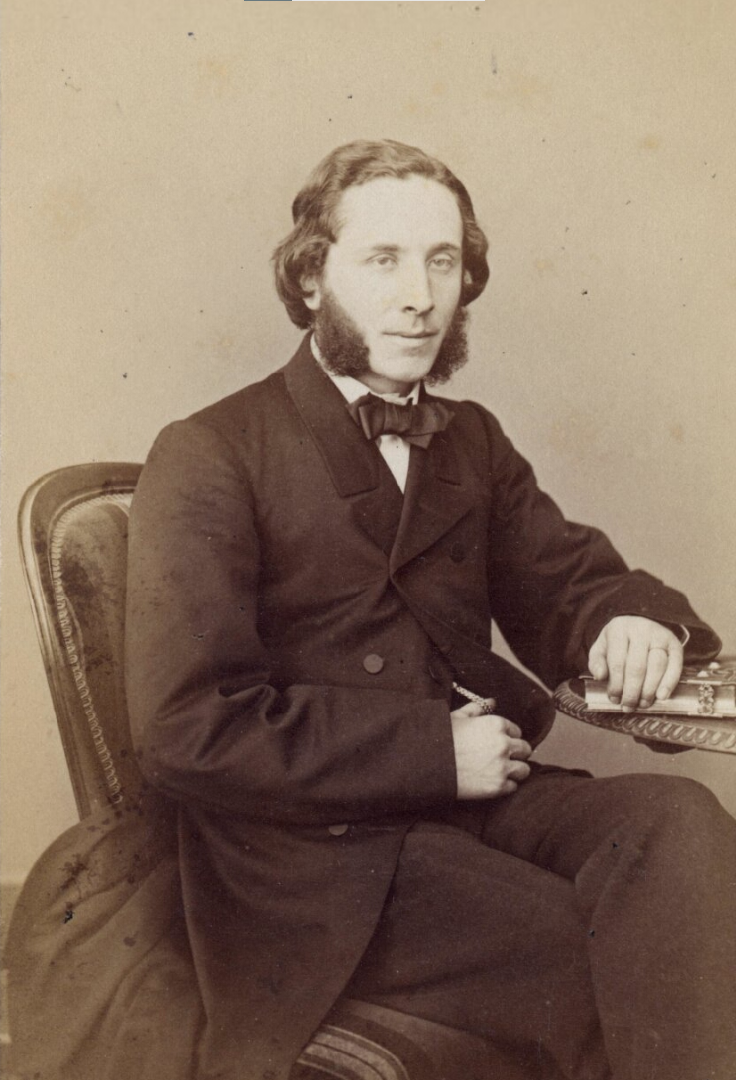
Ruffet c. 1865

Louis Ruffet (Nyon, 13 April 1836 – 1923) was a Swiss Protestant theologian, church historian and pastor.

In 1859, Ruffet received his bachelor's degree in theology at the École de theologie in Geneva and was ordained as a minister at the Église de l'Oratoire. He served as a minister in the French communities of Royan, Le Creusot and Aix-les-Bains, and in 1861 returned to Geneva as a minister at the Église de l'Oratoire, where he preached until 1869. In 1870–72 he worked as a director of a seminary in Lausanne, and afterwards, taught classes in church history at the École de théologie in Geneva. In 1874 he was awarded an honorary doctorate in theology from Princeton University.

== Selected works ==
- Thascius Cyprien, évêque de Carthage et les persécutions de son temps, 1872 – Thascius Cyprian, bishop of Carthage and the persecutions of his time.
- (François) Lambert d'Avignon, le réformateur de la Hesse – (Francis) Lambert of Avignon, the reformer of Hesse.
- Pietro Carnesecchi, un martyr de la Réforme en Italie, 1874 – Pietro Carnesecchi, a martyr of the Reformation in Italy.
- Vie de César Pronier et fragments de ses écrits, 1875 – Life of César Pronier and fragments of his writings.
- J.-L. Micheli : Notice biographique, 1875 – Biographical notice of Jean-Louis Micheli.
- Un grand libéral chrétien : le comte Agénor de Gasparin, 1884 – A great liberal Christian: Agénor de Gasparin.
- Georges Fox et les origines du Quakerisme 1624-1660, 1886 – George Fox and the origins of Quakerism, 1624–1660.
- Le devoir des chrétiens évangéliques dans la question de l'esclavage en Afrique, 1891 – The duty of evangelical Christians regarding the issue of slavery in Africa.
- Luther et la diète de Worms, 1903 – Luther and the Diet of Worms.
- Calvin et Servet : leçon publique, 1910 – Calvin and Servetus: public lessons.
- Jean Hus, le réformateur de la Bohême – John Hus, the reformer of Bohemia.
