= Grens =

- Municipality
- Flag Coat of arms
- Location of Grens
- Location within Switzerland Location within Canton of Vaud
- Coordinates: 46°24′N 6°11′E
- Country: Switzerland
- Canton: Vaud
- District: Nyon

Government
  - Mayor: Syndic

Area
  - Total: 2.54 km^{2} (0.98 sq mi)
- Elevation: 496 m (1,627 ft)

Population (2003)
  - Total: 319
  - Density: 126/km^{2} (325/sq mi)
- Time zone: UTC+01:00 (CET)
  - Summer (DST): UTC+02:00 (CEST)
- Postal code: 1274
- SFOS number: 5722
- ISO 3166 code: CH-VD
- Surrounded by: Borex, Chéserex, Gingins, Nyon, Signy-Avenex, Trélex
- Website: www.grens.ch

Grens is a municipality in the district of Nyon in the canton of Vaud in Switzerland.

== History ==
Grens is first mentioned around 1160-89 as de Grens. In 1164 it was mentioned as Graiens and in 1212 as Granz.

== Geography ==
Grens has an area, as of 2009, of 2.6 square kilometers (1.0 mi^{2}). Of this area, 2.28 km^{2} (0.88 mi^{2}) or 89.1% is used for agricultural purposes, while 0.05 km^{2} (0.019 mi^{2}) or 2.0% is forested. Of the rest of the land, 0.24 km^{2} (0.093 mi^{2}) or 9.4% is settled (buildings or roads).

Of the built up area, housing and buildings made up 4.3% and transportation infrastructure made up 3.9%. Out of the forested land, all of the forested land area is covered with heavy forests. Of the agricultural land, 72.3% is used for growing crops and 4.7% is pastures, while 12.1% is used for orchards or vine crops.

The municipality was part of the Nyon District until it was dissolved on 31 August 2006, and Grens became part of the new district of Nyon.

The municipality is located in the middle of a plateau between Nyon and the southern base of the Jura Mountains. It consists of the linear village of Grens.

== Coat of arms ==
The blazon of the municipal coat of arms is Pally of Six Or and Azure, overall two Keys Gules in saltire.

== Demographics ==
Grens has a population (as of December 2020) of 406. As of 2008, 17.5% of the population are resident foreign nationals. Over the last 10 years (1999–2009 ) the population has changed at a rate of 19.5%. It has changed at a rate of 7% due to migration and at a rate of 12.9% due to births and deaths.

Most of the population (as of 2000) speaks French (261 or 82.6%), with English being second most common (26 or 8.2%) and German being third (15 or 4.7%). There is 1 person who speaks Italian.

The age distribution, as of 2009, in Grens is; 52 children or 14.5% of the population are between 0 and 9 years old and 61 teenagers or 17.0% are between 10 and 19. Of the adult population, 23 people or 6.4% of the population are between 20 and 29 years old. 47 people or 13.1% are between 30 and 39, 79 people or 22.1% are between 40 and 49, and 29 people or 8.1% are between 50 and 59. The senior population distribution is 37 people or 10.3% of the population are between 60 and 69 years old, 22 people or 6.1% are between 70 and 79, there are 5 people or 1.4% who are between 80 and 89, and there are 3 people or 0.8% who are 90 and older.

As of 2000, there were 135 people who were single and never married in the municipality. There were 163 married individuals, 9 widows or widowers and 9 individuals who are divorced.

As of 2000, there were 110 private households in the municipality, and an average of 2.8 persons per household. There were 21 households that consist of only one person and 13 households with five or more people. Out of a total of 114 households that answered this question, 18.4% were households made up of just one person. Of the rest of the households, there are 29 married couples without children, 54 married couples with children There were 4 single parents with a child or children. There were 2 households that were made up of unrelated people and 4 households that were made up of some sort of institution or another collective housing.

In 2000 there were 46 single family homes (or 56.8% of the total) out of a total of 81 inhabited buildings. There were 12 multi-family buildings (14.8%), along with 22 multi-purpose buildings that were mostly used for housing (27.2%) and 1 other use buildings (commercial or industrial) that also had some housing (1.2%).

In 2000, a total of 105 apartments (89.7% of the total) were permanently occupied, while 9 apartments (7.7%) were seasonally occupied and 3 apartments (2.6%) were empty. As of 2009, the construction rate of new housing units was 0 new units per 1000 residents. The vacancy rate for the municipality, in 2010, was 0%.

The historical population is given in the following chart:

== Politics ==
In the 2007 federal election the most popular party was the SP which received 20.92% of the vote. The next three most popular parties were the SVP (18.68%), the FDP (16.15%) and the Green Party (15.56%). In the federal election, a total of 101 votes were cast, and the voter turnout was 51.3%.

== Economy ==
As of 2010, Grens had an unemployment rate of 4.2%. As of 2008, there were 31 people employed in the primary economic sector and about 7 businesses involved in this sector. 49 people were employed in the secondary sector and there were 7 businesses in this sector. 33 people were employed in the tertiary sector, with 6 businesses in this sector. There were 157 residents of the municipality who were employed in some capacity, of which females made up 37.6% of the workforce.

In 2008 the total number of full-time equivalent jobs was 91. The number of jobs in the primary sector was 19, all of which were in agriculture. The number of jobs in the secondary sector was 44 of which 21 or (47.7%) were in manufacturing and 23 (52.3%) were in construction. The number of jobs in the tertiary sector was 28. In the tertiary sector; 1 was in the sale or repair of motor vehicles, 21 or 75.0% were in a hotel or restaurant, 1 was in the information industry, 2 or 7.1% were technical professionals or scientists, and 3 or 10.7% were in health care.

In 2000, there were 38 workers who commuted into the municipality and 111 workers who commuted away. The municipality is a net exporter of workers, with about 2.9 workers leaving the municipality for every one entering. About 15.8% of the workforce coming into Grens are coming from outside Switzerland. Of the working population, 10.8% used public transportation to get to work, and 59.2% used a private car.

== Religion ==
From the 2000 census, 66 or 20.9% were Roman Catholic, while 131 or 41.5% belonged to the Swiss Reformed Church. Of the rest of the population, there were 2 members of an Orthodox church (or about 0.63% of the population), there were 3 individuals (or about 0.95% of the population) who belonged to the Christian Catholic Church, and there were 46 individuals (or about 14.56% of the population) who belonged to another Christian church. There was 1 individual who was Jewish, and 6 (or about 1.90% of the population) who were Islamic. 65 (or about 20.57% of the population) belonged to no church, are agnostic or atheist, and 15 individuals (or about 4.75% of the population) did not answer the question.

== Education ==
In Grens about 104 or (32.9%) of the population have completed non-mandatory upper secondary education, and 67 or (21.2%) have completed additional higher education (either university or a Fachhochschule). Of the 67 who completed tertiary schooling, 44.8% were Swiss men, 31.3% were Swiss women, 13.4% were non-Swiss men and 10.4% were non-Swiss women.

In the 2009/2010 school year there were a total of 56 students in the Grens school district. In the Vaud cantonal school system, two years of non-obligatory pre-school are provided by the political districts. During the school year, the political district provided pre-school care for a total of 1,249 children of which 563 children (45.1%) received subsidized pre-school care. The canton's primary school program requires students to attend for four years. There were 31 students in the municipal primary school program. The obligatory lower secondary school program lasts for six years and there were 25 students in those schools.

As of 2000, there were 4 students in Grens who came from another municipality, while 48 residents attended schools outside the municipality.
