= Arnex-sur-Nyon =

- Municipality
- Flag Coat of arms
- Location of Arnex-sur-Nyon
- Location within Switzerland Location within Canton of Vaud
- Coordinates: 46°22′N 06°11′E
- Country: Switzerland
- Canton: Vaud
- District: Nyon

Government
  - Mayor: Syndic; Christian Graf

Area
  - Total: 1.96 km^{2} (0.76 sq mi)
- Elevation: 450 m (1,480 ft)

Population (2004)
  - Total: 105
  - Density: 53.6/km^{2} (139/sq mi)
- Demonym(s): Les Arnésiens; Lè Redale
- Time zone: UTC+01:00 (CET)
  - Summer (DST): UTC+02:00 (CEST)
- Postal code: 1277
- SFOS number: 5701
- ISO 3166 code: CH-VD
- Surrounded by: Eysins, Crans-près-Céligny, Crassier, Borex
- Website: www.arnex-sur-nyon.ch

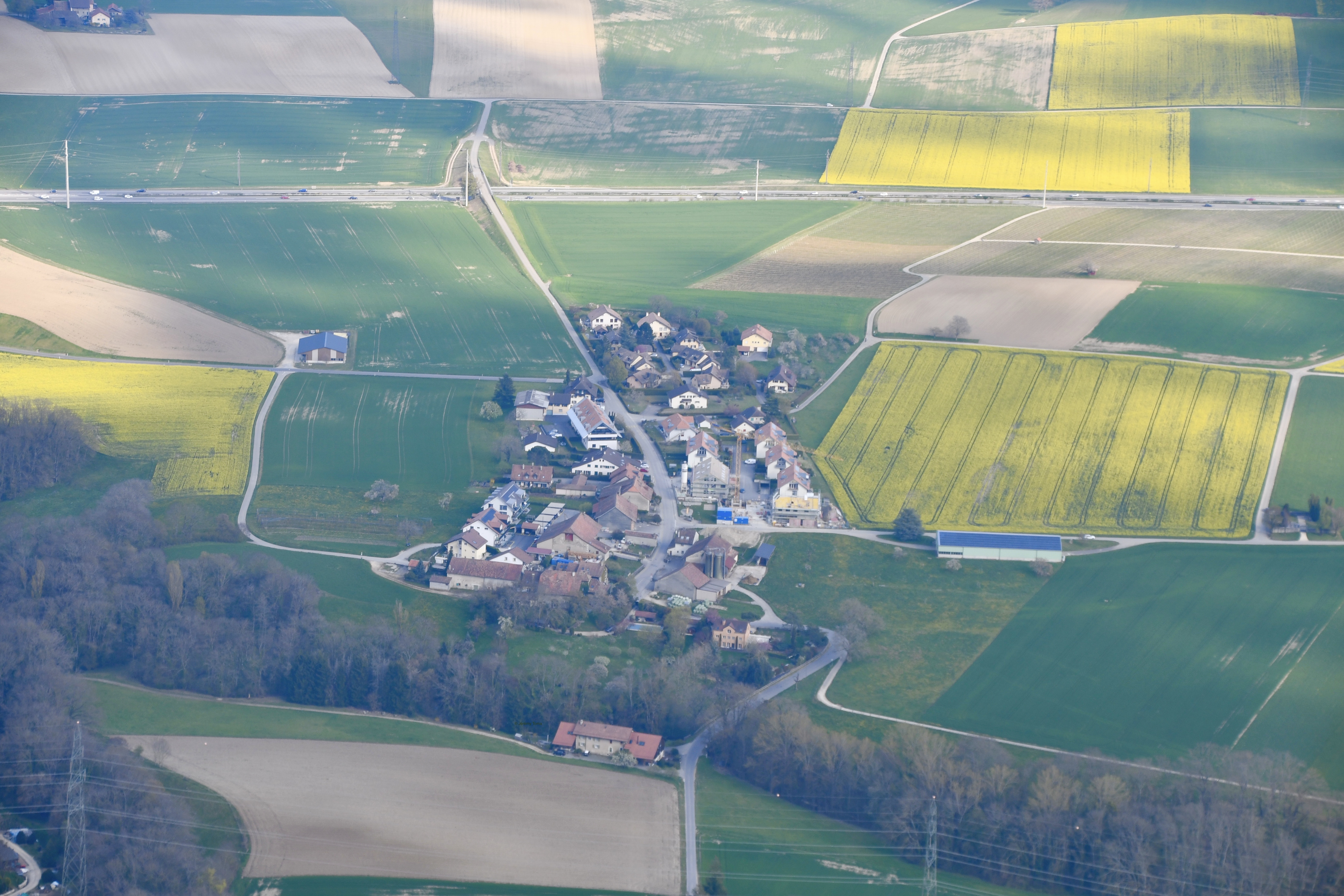
Arnex-sur-Nyon

Arnex-sur-Nyon (French pronunciation: [aʁnɛ syʁ njɔ̃], literally Arnex on Nyon) is a municipality in the district of Nyon in the canton of Vaud in Switzerland.

== History ==
Arnex-sur-Nyon is first mentioned in 1154 as Arnai.

== Geography ==
Arnex-sur-Nyon has an area, as of 2009, of 2 square kilometers (0.77 mi^{2}). Of this area, 1.59 km^{2} (0.61 mi^{2}) or 77.9% is used for agricultural purposes, while 0.32 km^{2} (0.12 mi^{2}) or 15.7% is forested. Of the rest of the land, 0.18 km^{2} (0.069 mi^{2}) or 8.8% is settled (buildings or roads) and 0.01 km^{2} (2.5 acres) or 0.5% is unproductive land.

Of the built up area, housing and buildings made up 3.9% and transportation infrastructure made up 4.4%. Out of the forested land, 13.2% of the total land area is heavily forested and 2.5% is covered with orchards or small clusters of trees. Of the agricultural land, 64.2% is used for growing crops and 4.9% is pastures, while 8.8% is used for orchards or vine crops.

The municipality was part of the Nyon District until it was dissolved on 31 August 2006, and Arnex-sur-Nyon became part of the new district of Nyon. The municipality is located in the Nyon district. It consists of the village of Arnex-sur-Nyon and the hamlets of Bez. Nyon.

== Coat of arms ==
The blazon of the municipal coat of arms is Per fess, 1. Argent, seme of billets Sable, semi-lion Sable langued Gules; 2. divided per fess in four: I. and III. Azure a mullet of five Or, II. and IV. Argent.

== Demographics ==
Arnex-sur-Nyon has a population (as of December 2020) of 242. As of 2008, 25.0% of the population are resident foreign nationals. Over the last 10 years (1999–2009 ) the population has changed at a rate of 13.9%. It has changed at a rate of 9.8% due to migration and at a rate of 3.3% due to births and deaths.

Most of the population (as of 2000) speaks French (84 or 61.8%), with English being second most common (40 or 29.4%) and Swedish being third (4 or 2.9%). There is 1 person who speaks German.

The age distribution, as of 2009, in Arnex-sur-Nyon is; 15 children or 12.1% of the population are between 0 and 9 years old and 13 teenagers or 10.5% are between 10 and 19. Of the adult population, 12 people or 9.7% of the population are between 20 and 29 years old. 19 people or 15.3% are between 30 and 39, 22 people or 17.7% are between 40 and 49, and 19 people or 15.3% are between 50 and 59. The senior population distribution is 16 people or 12.9% of the population are between 60 and 69 years old, 7 people or 5.6% are between 70 and 79, there is 1 person who is 80 and 89.

As of 2000, there were 60 people who were single and never married in the municipality. There were 69 married individuals, 5 widows or widowers and 2 individuals who are divorced.

As of 2000, there were 45 private households in the municipality, and an average of 2.9 persons per household. There were 10 households that consist of only one person and 8 households with five or more people. Out of a total of 48 households that answered this question, 20.8% were households made up of just one person. Of the rest of the households, there are 10 married couples without children, 23 married couples with children There was one single parent with a child or children. There was 1 household that was made up of unrelated people and 3 households that were made up of some sort of institution or another collective housing.

In 2000 there were 25 single-family homes (or 62.5% of the total) out of a total of 40 inhabited buildings. There were 1 multi-family buildings (2.5%), along with 13 multi-purpose buildings that were mostly used for housing (32.5%) and 1 other use buildings (commercial or industrial) that also had some housing (2.5%). Of the single-family homes 5 were built before 1919, while 5 were built between 1990 and 2000. The greatest number of single-family homes (12) were built between 1981 and 1990. The most multi-family homes (1) were built between 1981 and 1990.

In 2000, a total of 40 apartments (83.3% of the total) were permanently occupied, while 4 apartments (8.3%) were seasonally occupied and 4 apartments (8.3%) were empty. As of 2009, the construction rate of new housing units was 0 new units per 1000 residents. The vacancy rate for the municipality, in 2010, was 0%.

The historical population is given in the following chart:

== Politics ==
In the 2007 federal election the most popular party was the SVP which received 29.15% of the vote. The next three most popular parties were the FDP (25.8%), the LPS Party (13.56%) and the Green Party (8.89%). In the federal election, a total of 41 votes were cast, and the voter turnout was 56.2%.

== Economy ==
As of 2010, Arnex-sur-Nyon had an unemployment rate of 0.9%. As of 2008, there were 19 people employed in the primary economic sector and about 5 businesses involved in this sector. 1 person was employed in the secondary sector and there was 1 business in this sector. 3 people were employed in the tertiary sector, with 3 businesses in this sector. There were 74 residents of the municipality who were employed in some capacity, of which females made up 39.2% of the workforce.

In 2008 the total number of full-time equivalent jobs was 16. The number of jobs in the primary sector was 13, all of which were in agriculture. There were no jobs in the secondary sector. The number of jobs in the tertiary sector was 3. In the tertiary sector; 1 was in the sale or repair of motor vehicles, 1 was in the information industry, 1 was in education.

In 2000, there were 9 workers who commuted into the municipality and 46 workers who commuted away. The municipality is a net exporter of workers, with about 5.1 workers leaving the municipality for every one entering. Of the working population, 10.8% used public transportation to get to work, and 52.7% used a private car.

== Religion ==
From the 2000 census, 29 or 21.3% were Roman Catholic, while 54 or 39.7% belonged to the Swiss Reformed Church. Of the rest of the population, there were 8 individuals (or about 5.88% of the population) who belonged to another Christian church. There were 2 individuals (or about 1.47% of the population) who were Jewish, and 7 (or about 5.15% of the population) who were Islamic. There was 1 person who was Buddhist. 28 (or about 20.59% of the population) belonged to no church, are agnostic or atheist, and 11 individuals (or about 8.09% of the population) did not answer the question.

== Education ==
In Arnex-sur-Nyon about 36 or (26.5%) of the population have completed non-mandatory upper secondary education, and 40 or (29.4%) have completed additional higher education (either university or a Fachhochschule). Of the 40 who completed tertiary schooling, 32.5% were Swiss men, 17.5% were Swiss women, 32.5% were non-Swiss men and 17.5% were non-Swiss women.

In the 2009/2010 school year there were a total of 11 students in the Arnex-sur-Nyon school district. In the Vaud cantonal school system, two years of non-obligatory pre-school are provided by the political districts. During the school year, the political district provided pre-school care for a total of 1,249 children of which 563 children (45.1%) received subsidized pre-school care. The canton's primary school program requires students to attend for four years. There were 7 students in the municipal primary school program. The obligatory lower secondary school program lasts for six years and there were 4 students in those schools.

As of 2000, there were 21 students from Arnex-sur-Nyon who attended schools outside the municipality.
