= Borex =

- Municipality
- Flag Coat of arms
- Location of Borex
- Location within Switzerland Location within Canton of Vaud
- Coordinates: 46°23′N 6°11′E
- Country: Switzerland
- Canton: Vaud
- District: Nyon

Government
  - Mayor: Syndic

Area
  - Total: 2.01 km^{2} (0.78 sq mi)
- Elevation: 470 m (1,540 ft)

Population (2003)
  - Total: 853
  - Density: 424/km^{2} (1,100/sq mi)
- Time zone: UTC+01:00 (CET)
  - Summer (DST): UTC+02:00 (CEST)
- Postal code: 1277
- SFOS number: 5706
- ISO 3166 code: CH-VD
- Surrounded by: Arnex-sur-Nyon, Chéserex, Crassier, Eysins, Grens, Signy-Avenex
- Website: www.borex.ch

Borex is a municipality in the district of Nyon in the canton of Vaud in Switzerland.

== History ==
Borex is first mentioned in 1213 as Borrai.

== Geography ==
Borex has an area, as of 2009, of 2 square kilometers (0.77 mi^{2}). Of this area, 1.51 km^{2} (0.58 mi^{2}) or 76.3% is used for agricultural purposes, while 0.03 km^{2} (0.012 mi^{2}) or 1.5% is forested. Of the rest of the land, 0.41 km^{2} (0.16 mi^{2}) or 20.7% is settled (buildings or roads).

Of the built up area, housing and buildings made up 15.2% and transportation infrastructure made up 4.5%. Out of the forested land, all of the forested land area is covered with heavy forests. Of the agricultural land, 62.6% is used for growing crops and 2.0% is pastures, while 11.6% is used for orchards or vine crops.

The municipality was part of the Nyon District until it was dissolved on 31 August 2006, and Borex became part of the new district of Nyon.

The municipality is located at the foot of the Jura Mountains near the French border.

== Coat of arms ==
The blazon of the municipal coat of arms is Barry of six Azure with a rose Or, and Argent.

== Demographics ==
Borex has a population (as of December 2020) of 1,153. As of 2008, 26.5% of the population are resident foreign nationals. Over the last 10 years (1999–2009) the population has changed at a rate of -2.8%. It has changed at a rate of -9% due to migration and at a rate of 5.4% due to births and deaths.

Most of the population (as of 2000) speaks French (646 or 74.7%), with German being second most common (91 or 10.5%) and English being third (68 or 7.9%). There are 15 people who speak Italian.

The age distribution, as of 2009, in Borex is; 96 children or 11.7% of the population are between 0 and 9 years old and 116 teenagers or 14.1% are between 10 and 19. Of the adult population, 67 people or 8.2% of the population are between 20 and 29 years old. 90 people or 11.0% are between 30 and 39, 151 people or 18.4% are between 40 and 49, and 122 people or 14.9% are between 50 and 59. The senior population distribution is 114 people or 13.9% of the population are between 60 and 69 years old, 40 people or 4.9% are between 70 and 79, there are 20 people or 2.4% who are between 80 and 89, and there are 5 people or 0.6% who are 90 and older.

As of 2000, there were 358 people who were single and never married in the municipality. There were 435 married individuals, 32 widows or widowers and 40 individuals who are divorced.

As of 2000, there were 312 private households in the municipality, and an average of 2.7 persons per household. There were 67 households that consist of only one person and 31 households with five or more people. Out of a total of 324 households that answered this question, 20.7% were households made up of just one person. Of the rest of the households, there are 81 married couples without children, 137 married couples with children There were 22 single parents with a child or children. There were 5 households that were made up of unrelated people and 12 households that were made up of some sort of institution or another collective housing.

In 2000 there were 171 single family homes (or 76.3% of the total) out of a total of 224 inhabited buildings. There were 29 multi-family buildings (12.9%), along with 20 multi-purpose buildings that were mostly used for housing (8.9%) and 4 other use buildings (commercial or industrial) that also had some housing (1.8%).

In 2000, a total of 293 apartments (89.6% of the total) were permanently occupied, while 31 apartments (9.5%) were seasonally occupied and 3 apartments (0.9%) were empty. As of 2009, the construction rate of new housing units was 2.3 new units per 1000 residents. The vacancy rate for the municipality, in 2010, was 0%.

The historical population is given in the following chart:

== Politics ==
In the 2007 federal election the most popular party was the SVP which received 26.25% of the vote. The next three most popular parties were the CVP (14.58%), the LPS Party (14.12%) and the SP (13.79%). In the federal election, a total of 223 votes were cast, and the voter turnout was 37.5%.

== Economy ==
As of 2010, Borex had an unemployment rate of 2.4%. As of 2008, there were 21 people employed in the primary economic sector and about 8 businesses involved in this sector. 25 people were employed in the secondary sector and there were 4 businesses in this sector. 116 people were employed in the tertiary sector, with 24 businesses in this sector. There were 431 residents of the municipality who were employed in some capacity, of which females made up 43.6% of the workforce.

In 2008 the total number of full-time equivalent jobs was 127. The number of jobs in the primary sector was 17, all of which were in agriculture. The number of jobs in the secondary sector was 23 of which 4 or (17.4%) were in manufacturing and 19 (82.6%) were in construction. The number of jobs in the tertiary sector was 87. In the tertiary sector; 14 or 16.1% were in wholesale or retail sales or the repair of motor vehicles, 9 or 10.3% were in the movement and storage of goods, 4 or 4.6% were in a hotel or restaurant, 3 or 3.4% were in the information industry, 14 or 16.1% were technical professionals or scientists, 37 or 42.5% were in education.

In 2000, there were 107 workers who commuted into the municipality and 344 workers who commuted away. The municipality is a net exporter of workers, with about 3.2 workers leaving the municipality for every one entering. About 10.3% of the workforce coming into Borex are coming from outside Switzerland. Of the working population, 13% used public transportation to get to work, and 70.5% used a private car.

== Religion ==
From the 2000 census, 234 or 27.1% were Roman Catholic, while 333 or 38.5% belonged to the Swiss Reformed Church. Of the rest of the population, there were 5 members of an Orthodox church (or about 0.58% of the population), there were 4 individuals (or about 0.46% of the population) who belonged to the Christian Catholic Church, and there were 50 individuals (or about 5.78% of the population) who belonged to another Christian church. There were 3 (or about 0.35% of the population) who were Islamic. There was 1 person who was Hindu and 4 individuals who belonged to another church. 190 (or about 21.97% of the population) belonged to no church, are agnostic or atheist, and 64 individuals (or about 7.40% of the population) did not answer the question.

== Education ==
In Borex about 276 or (31.9%) of the population have completed non-mandatory upper secondary education, and 227 or (26.2%) have completed additional higher education (either university or a Fachhochschule). Of the 227 who completed tertiary schooling, 41.9% were Swiss men, 26.4% were Swiss women, 18.5% were non-Swiss men and 13.2% were non-Swiss women.

In the 2009/2010 school year there were a total of 90 students in the Borex school district. In the Vaud cantonal school system, two years of non-obligatory pre-school are provided by the political districts. During the school year, the political district provided pre-school care for a total of 1,249 children of which 563 children (45.1%) received subsidized pre-school care. The canton's primary school program requires students to attend for four years. There were 49 students in the municipal primary school program. The obligatory lower secondary school program lasts for six years and there were 40 students in those schools. There were also 1 students who were home schooled or attended another non-traditional school.

As of 2000, there were 367 students in Borex who came from another municipality, while 93 residents attended schools outside the municipality.
