= Eugène Rambert =

Swiss author (1830–1886)

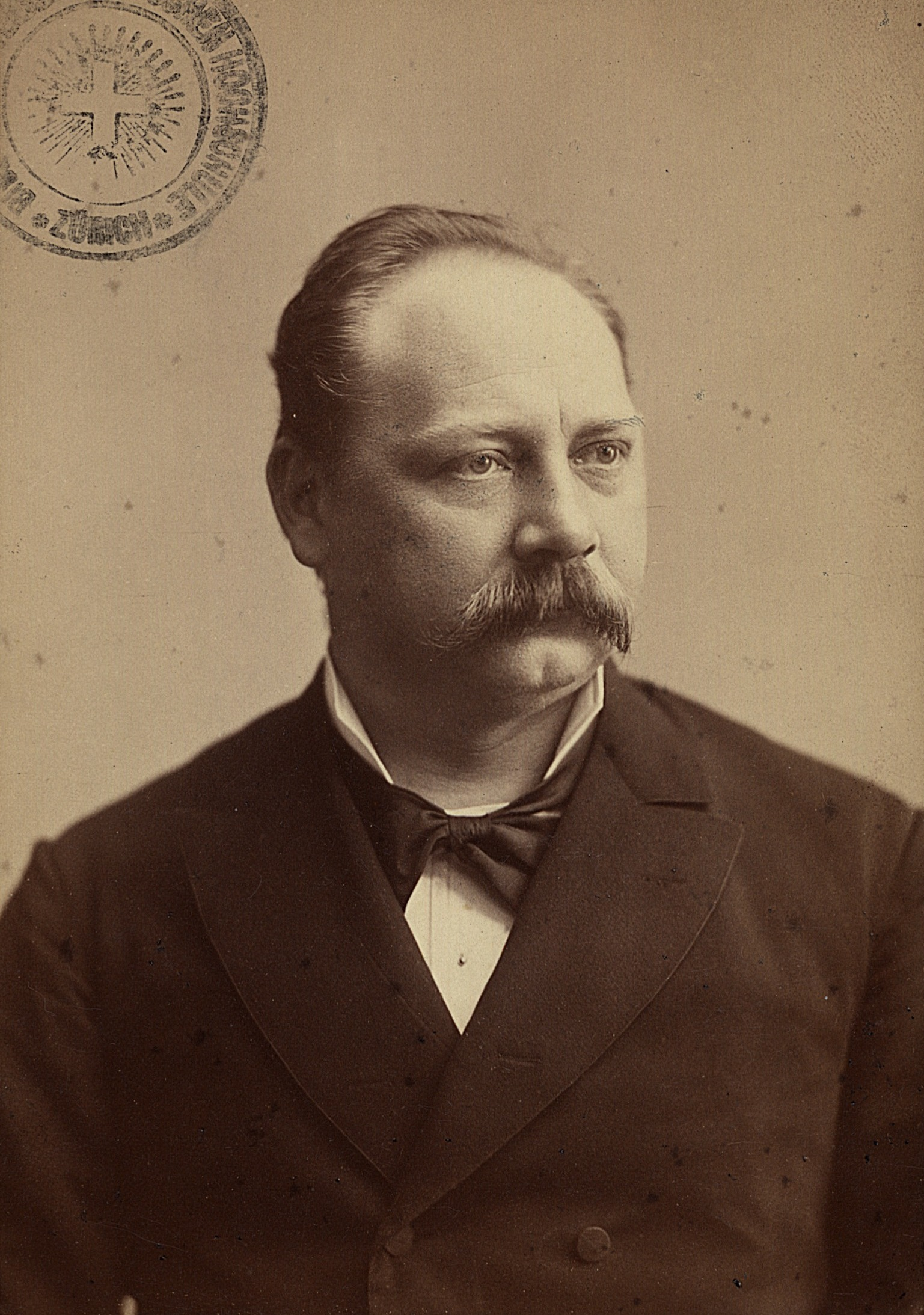
Eugène Rambert.

Eugène Rambert (6 April 1830 – 21 November 1886), was a Swiss author and poet.

== Life ==
He was born at Sâles near Swiss Clarens, the eldest son of a Vaudois schoolmaster, from whom he received his education. When in 1845 his father lost his post owing to the religious disputes, Rambert became a teacher in Paris, and later a tutor in England and at Geneva. When the family's fortunes improved, Rambert was able to pursue his studies for the ministry, but he was more attracted by literature, and in 1855 became professor of French literature at the academy of Lausanne, and in 1860 at the Swiss Federal Institute of Technology in Zürich, where he remained till 1881, when he again became professor at Lausanne.

His principal work, Les Alpes suisses (5 vols., 1866–1875; republished with large additions, according to his own scheme, in 6 volumes, 1887–1889), is a mine of miscellaneous information on the subject. He also published several volumes of poetry, as well as a volume entitled Écrivains nationaux (1874, republished 1889), and biographies of the pietist Alexandre Vinet (1875), of the poet Juste Olivier (1879) and of the artist Alexandre Calame (1883).

Rambert's Dernières Poesies were edited (1903) by Henri Warnery, whose Eugène Rambert (Lausanne, 1890) contains a critical estimate.
