= Eysins =

- Municipality
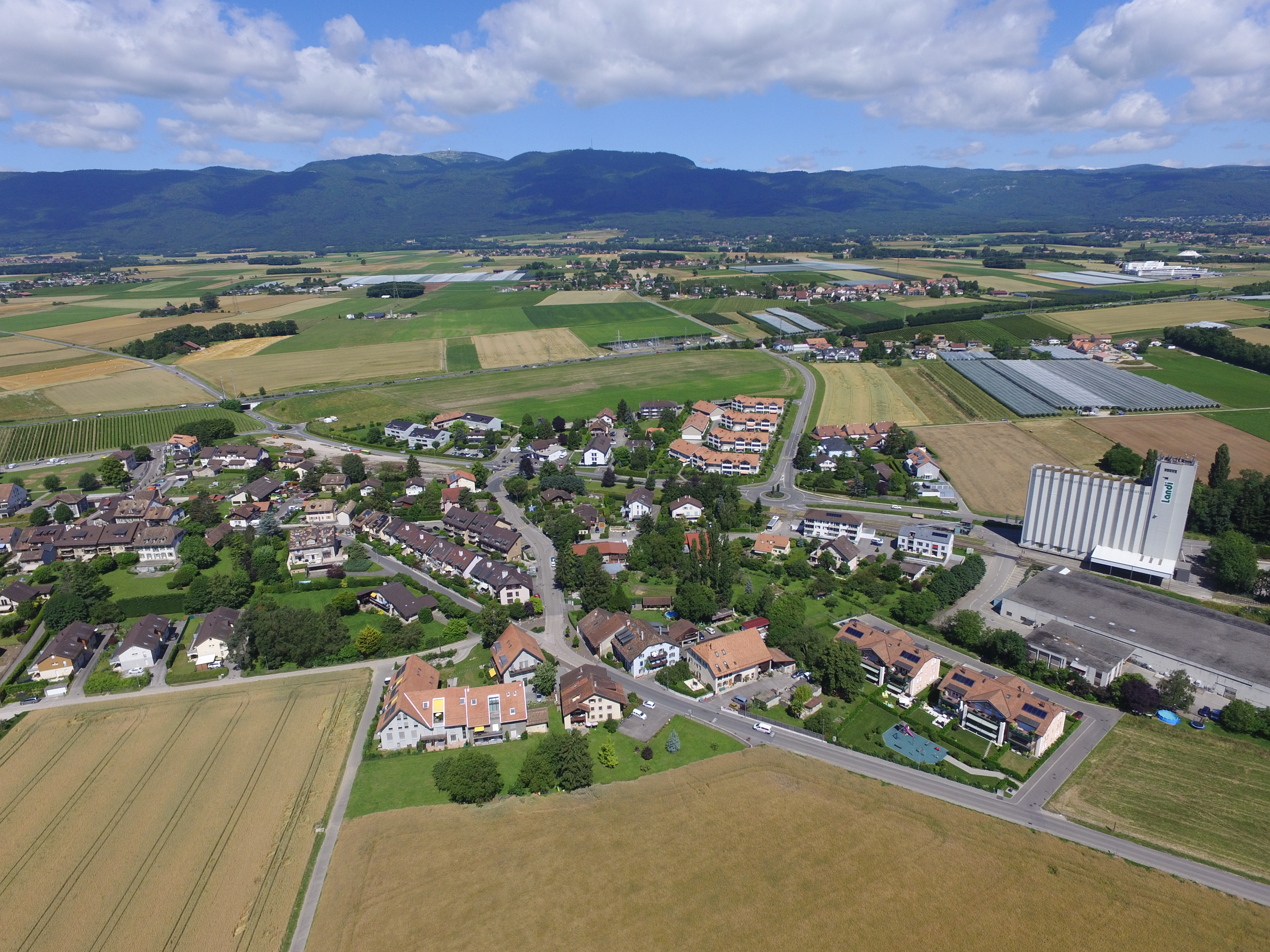
- Eysins, aerial view

- Flag Coat of arms
- Location of Eysins
- Location within Switzerland Location within Canton of Vaud
- Coordinates: 46°23′N 6°12′E
- Country: Switzerland
- Canton: Vaud
- District: Nyon

Government
  - Mayor: Syndic

Area
  - Total: 2.38 km^{2} (0.92 sq mi)
- Elevation: 438 m (1,437 ft)

Population (2003)
  - Total: 836
  - Density: 351/km^{2} (910/sq mi)
- Time zone: UTC+01:00 (CET)
  - Summer (DST): UTC+02:00 (CEST)
- Postal code: 1262
- SFOS number: 5716
- ISO 3166 code: CH-VD
- Surrounded by: Arnex-sur-Nyon, Borex, Crans-près-Céligny, Nyon, Signy-Avenex
- Website: www.eysins.ch

Eysins is a municipality in the district of Nyon in the canton of Vaud in Switzerland.

== History ==
Eysins is first mentioned around 1001-02 as Osinco.

== Geography ==
Eysins has an area, as of 2009, of 2.4 square kilometers (0.93 mi^{2}). Of this area, 1.67 km^{2} (0.64 mi^{2}) or 70.2% is used for agricultural purposes, while 0.19 km^{2} (0.073 mi^{2}) or 8.0% is forested. Of the rest of the land, 0.48 km^{2} (0.19 mi^{2}) or 20.2% is settled (buildings or roads).

Of the built up area, industrial buildings made up 4.2% of the total area while housing and buildings made up 10.5% and transportation infrastructure made up 5.0%. Out of the forested land, all of the forested land area is covered with heavy forests. Of the agricultural land, 58.0% is used for growing crops and 2.5% is pastures, while 9.7% is used for orchards or vine crops.

The municipality was part of the Nyon District until it was dissolved on 31 August 2006, and Eysins became part of the new district of Nyon.

The municipality is located along the Nyon-Divonne-les-Bains road. It consists of the village of Eysins and the hamlet of Le Petit Eysins.

== Coat of arms ==
The blazon of the municipal coat of arms is Azure, a cross Or between two Roses of the same in chief.

== Demographics ==
Eysins has a population (as of December 2020) of 1,738. As of 2008, 27.5% of the population are resident foreign nationals. Over the last 10 years (1999–2009) the population has changed at a rate of 39.1%. It has changed at a rate of 27.4% due to migration and at a rate of 11.1% due to births and deaths.

Most of the population (as of 2000) speaks French (682 or 82.1%), with English being second most common (53 or 6.4%) and German being third (51 or 6.1%). There are 10 people who speak Italian.

The age distribution, as of 2009, in Eysins is; 185 children or 15.8% of the population are between 0 and 9 years old and 137 teenagers or 11.7% are between 10 and 19. Of the adult population, 112 people or 9.5% of the population are between 20 and 29 years old. 215 people or 18.3% are between 30 and 39, 197 people or 16.8% are between 40 and 49, and 122 people or 10.4% are between 50 and 59. The senior population distribution is 122 people or 10.4% of the population are between 60 and 69 years old, 63 people or 5.4% are between 70 and 79, there are 13 people or 1.1% who are between 80 and 89, and there are 7 people or 0.6% who are 90 and older.

As of 2000, there were 350 people who were single and never married in the municipality. There were 403 married individuals, 28 widows or widowers and 50 individuals who are divorced.

As of 2000, there were 339 private households in the municipality, and an average of 2.4 persons per household. There were 111 households that consist of only one person and 27 households with five or more people. Out of a total of 352 households that answered this question, 31.5% were households made up of just one person and there were 3 adults who lived with their parents. Of the rest of the households, there are 97 married couples without children, 112 married couples with children There were 13 single parents with a child or children. There were 3 households that were made up of unrelated people and 13 households that were made up of some sort of institution or another collective housing.

In 2000 there were 103 single family homes (or 60.9% of the total) out of a total of 169 inhabited buildings. There were 44 multi-family buildings (26.0%), along with 13 multi-purpose buildings that were mostly used for housing (7.7%) and 9 other use buildings (commercial or industrial) that also had some housing (5.3%).

In 2000, a total of 297 apartments (83.0% of the total) were permanently occupied, while 60 apartments (16.8%) were seasonally occupied and one apartment was empty. As of 2009, the construction rate of new housing units was 53.6 new units per 1000 residents. The vacancy rate for the municipality, in 2010, was 0.62%.

The historical population is given in the following chart:

== Politics ==
In the 2007 federal election the most popular party was the SVP which received 18.41% of the vote. The next three most popular parties were the Green Party (17.86%), the SP (17.12%) and the CVP (13.8%). In the federal election, a total of 238 votes were cast, and the voter turnout was 43.7%.

== Economy ==
As of 2010, Eysins had an unemployment rate of 6%. As of 2008, there were 17 people employed in the primary economic sector and about 7 businesses involved in this sector. 106 people were employed in the secondary sector and there were 12 businesses in this sector. 144 people were employed in the tertiary sector, with 38 businesses in this sector. There were 460 residents of the municipality who were employed in some capacity, of which females made up 41.1% of the workforce.

In 2008 the total number of full-time equivalent jobs was 235. The number of jobs in the primary sector was 13, all of which were in agriculture. The number of jobs in the secondary sector was 104 of which 91 or (87.5%) were in manufacturing and 14 (13.5%) were in construction. The number of jobs in the tertiary sector was 118. In the tertiary sector; 38 or 32.2% were in wholesale or retail sales or the repair of motor vehicles, 9 or 7.6% were in the movement and storage of goods, 3 or 2.5% were in a hotel or restaurant, 9 or 7.6% were in the information industry, 6 or 5.1% were the insurance or financial industry, 30 or 25.4% were technical professionals or scientists, 10 or 8.5% were in education.

In 2000, there were 221 workers who commuted into the municipality and 373 workers who commuted away. The municipality is a net exporter of workers, with about 1.7 workers leaving the municipality for every one entering. About 25.8% of the workforce coming into Eysins are coming from outside Switzerland. Of the working population, 12.4% used public transportation to get to work, and 68.5% used a private car.

== Religion ==
From the 2000 census, 252 or 30.3% were Roman Catholic, while 335 or 40.3% belonged to the Swiss Reformed Church. Of the rest of the population, there were 6 members of an Orthodox church (or about 0.72% of the population), and there were 35 individuals (or about 4.21% of the population) who belonged to another Christian church. There was 1 individual who was Jewish, and 23 (or about 2.77% of the population) who were Islamic. There was 1 person who was Buddhist and 2 individuals who were Hindu. 148 (or about 17.81% of the population) belonged to no church, are agnostic or atheist, and 44 individuals (or about 5.29% of the population) did not answer the question.

== Education ==
In Eysins about 328 or (39.5%) of the population have completed non-mandatory upper secondary education, and 180 or (21.7%) have completed additional higher education (either university or a Fachhochschule). Of the 180 who completed tertiary schooling, 50.6% were Swiss men, 22.2% were Swiss women, 16.7% were non-Swiss men and 10.6% were non-Swiss women.

In the 2009/2010 school year there were a total of 134 students in the Eysins school district. In the Vaud cantonal school system, two years of non-obligatory pre-school are provided by the political districts. During the school year, the political district provided pre-school care for a total of 1,249 children of which 563 children (45.1%) received subsidized pre-school care. The canton's primary school program requires students to attend for four years. There were 81 students in the municipal primary school program. The obligatory lower secondary school program lasts for six years and there were 53 students in those schools.

As of 2000, there were 30 students in Eysins who came from another municipality, while 88 residents attended schools outside the municipality.

== Notable people ==
- Juste Olivier (1807 in Eysins - 1876), a Swiss poet, brought up as a peasant, but studied at the college of Nyon, and later at the academy of Lausanne.
- Edgar Snow (1905 – 1972 in Eysins) an American journalist known for his books and articles on Communism in China
