= Fenistil =

Fenistil is a brand name for some over the counter medications distributed by Haleon.

Products include:

- Fenistil Gel, containing dimetindene
- Fenistil Cold Sore Cream, containing penciclovir
- FeniHydrocort, containing cortisone
