= Signy-Avenex =

- Municipality
- Flag Coat of arms
- Location of Signy-Avenex
- Location within Switzerland Location within Canton of Vaud
- Coordinates: 46°23′N 6°12′E
- Country: Switzerland
- Canton: Vaud
- District: Nyon

Government
  - Mayor: Syndic

Area
  - Total: 1.93 km^{2} (0.75 sq mi)
- Elevation: 470 m (1,540 ft)

Population (2003)
  - Total: 404
  - Density: 209/km^{2} (542/sq mi)
- Time zone: UTC+01:00 (CET)
  - Summer (DST): UTC+02:00 (CEST)
- Postal code: 1274
- SFOS number: 5728
- ISO 3166 code: CH-VD
- Surrounded by: Borex, Eysins, Grens, Nyon
- Website: www.signy-avenex.ch

Signy-Avenex (French pronunciation: [siɲi avnɛ]) is a municipality in the district of Nyon in the canton of Vaud in Switzerland.

== History ==
Avenex is first mentioned in 926 as Avenaco. In 1018, Signy was mentioned as Sigiciacum.

== Geography ==
Signy-Avenex has an area, as of 2009, of 1.9 square kilometers (0.73 mi^{2}). Of this area, 1.45 km^{2} (0.56 mi^{2}) or 75.1% is used for agricultural purposes, while 0.05 km^{2} (0.019 mi^{2}) or 2.6% is forested. Of the rest of the land, 0.42 km^{2} (0.16 mi^{2}) or 21.8% is settled (buildings or roads).

Of the built up area, industrial buildings made up 1.6% of the total area while housing and buildings made up 6.2% and transportation infrastructure made up 10.4%. Power and water infrastructure as well as other special developed areas made up 2.6% of the area Out of the forested land, all of the forested land area is covered with heavy forests. Of the agricultural land, 46.6% is used for growing crops and 10.4% is pastures, while 18.1% is used for orchards or vine crops.

The municipality was part of the Nyon District until it was dissolved on 31 August 2006, and Signy-Avenex became part of the new district of Nyon.

The municipality is located in a small valley above Nyon. It consists of the linear village of Signy and the hamlet of Avenex.

== Coat of arms ==
The blazon of the municipal coat of arms is Per bend Gules and Azure, overall a Cross bottony Argent.

== Demographics ==
Signy-Avenex has a population (as of December 2020) of 585. As of 2008, 23.9% of the population are resident foreign nationals. Over the last 10 years (1999–2009) the population has changed at a rate of 18.6%. It has changed at a rate of 5.9% due to migration and at a rate of 13.5% due to births and deaths.

Most of the population (as of 2000) speaks French (307 or 78.7%), with English being second most common (46 or 11.8%) and German being third (23 or 5.9%). There is 1 person who speaks Italian.

The age distribution, as of 2009, in Signy-Avenex is; 49 children or 11.6% of the population are between 0 and 9 years old and 42 teenagers or 10.0% are between 10 and 19. Of the adult population, 33 people or 7.8% of the population are between 20 and 29 years old. 66 people or 15.6% are between 30 and 39, 68 people or 16.1% are between 40 and 49, and 53 people or 12.6% are between 50 and 59. The senior population distribution is 60 people or 14.2% of the population are between 60 and 69 years old, 35 people or 8.3% are between 70 and 79, there are 13 people or 3.1% who are between 80 and 89, and there are 3 people or 0.7% who are 90 and older.

As of 2000, there were 147 people who were single and never married in the municipality. There were 219 married individuals, 10 widows or widowers and 14 individuals who are divorced.

As of 2000, there were 152 private households in the municipality, and an average of 2.4 persons per household. There were 31 households that consist of only one person and 7 households with five or more people. Out of a total of 160 households that answered this question, 19.4% were households made up of just one person. Of the rest of the households, there are 60 married couples without children, 47 married couples with children There were 10 single parents with a child or children. There were 4 households that were made up of unrelated people and 8 households that were made up of some sort of institution or another collective housing.

In 2000 there were 59 single family homes (or 60.8% of the total) out of a total of 97 inhabited buildings. There were 18 multi-family buildings (18.6%), along with 17 multi-purpose buildings that were mostly used for housing (17.5%) and 3 other use buildings (commercial or industrial) that also had some housing (3.1%).

In 2000, a total of 117 apartments (73.1% of the total) were permanently occupied, while 42 apartments (26.3%) were seasonally occupied and one apartment was empty. As of 2009, the construction rate of new housing units was 0 new units per 1000 residents. The vacancy rate for the municipality, in 2010, was 0.52%.

The historical population is given in the following chart:

== Politics ==
In the 2007 federal election the most popular party was the SVP which received 25.72% of the vote. The next three most popular parties were the LPS Party (23.3%), the FDP (18.26%) and the SP (10.89%). In the federal election, a total of 142 votes were cast, and the voter turnout was 53.4%.

== Economy ==
As of 2010, Signy-Avenex had an unemployment rate of 3.5%. As of 2008, there were 58 people employed in the primary economic sector and about 8 businesses involved in this sector. 8 people were employed in the secondary sector and there were 2 businesses in this sector. 582 people were employed in the tertiary sector, with 66 businesses in this sector. There were 225 residents of the municipality who were employed in some capacity, of which females made up 46.2% of the workforce.

In 2008 the total number of full-time equivalent jobs was 535. The number of jobs in the primary sector was 29, all of which were in agriculture. The number of jobs in the secondary sector was 7 of which 4 or (57.1%) were in manufacturing and 3 (42.9%) were in construction. The number of jobs in the tertiary sector was 499. In the tertiary sector; 278 or 55.7% were in wholesale or retail sales or the repair of motor vehicles, 9 or 1.8% were in the movement and storage of goods, 32 or 6.4% were in a hotel or restaurant, 6 or 1.2% were in the information industry, 22 or 4.4% were the insurance or financial industry, 92 or 18.4% were technical professionals or scientists, 13 or 2.6% were in education and 19 or 3.8% were in health care.

In 2000, there were 529 workers who commuted into the municipality and 176 workers who commuted away. The municipality is a net importer of workers, with about 3.0 workers entering the municipality for every one leaving. About 17.2% of the workforce coming into Signy-Avenex are coming from outside Switzerland. Of the working population, 16.4% used public transportation to get to work, and 66.7% used a private car.

== Religion ==
From the 2000 census, 85 or 21.8% were Roman Catholic, while 173 or 44.4% belonged to the Swiss Reformed Church. Of the rest of the population, there were 2 members of an Orthodox church (or about 0.51% of the population), and there were 18 individuals (or about 4.62% of the population) who belonged to another Christian church. There were 2 individuals (or about 0.51% of the population) who were Jewish, and there was 1 individual who was Islamic. 89 (or about 22.82% of the population) belonged to no church, are agnostic or atheist, and 28 individuals (or about 7.18% of the population) did not answer the question.

== Education ==
In Signy-Avenex about 127 or (32.6%) of the population have completed non-mandatory upper secondary education, and 110 or (28.2%) have completed additional higher education (either university or a Fachhochschule). Of the 110 who completed tertiary schooling, 41.8% were Swiss men, 23.6% were Swiss women, 20.0% were non-Swiss men and 14.5% were non-Swiss women.

In the 2009/2010 school year there were a total of 34 students in the Signy-Avenex school district. In the Vaud cantonal school system, two years of non-obligatory pre-school are provided by the political districts. During the school year, the political district provided pre-school care for a total of 1,249 children of which 563 children (45.1%) received subsidized pre-school care. The canton's primary school program requires students to attend for four years. There were 20 students in the municipal primary school program. The obligatory lower secondary school program lasts for six years and there were 14 students in those schools.

As of 2000, there were 48 students from Signy-Avenex who attended schools outside the municipality.
