= Nyon =

Place in Vaud, Switzerland

- Municipality
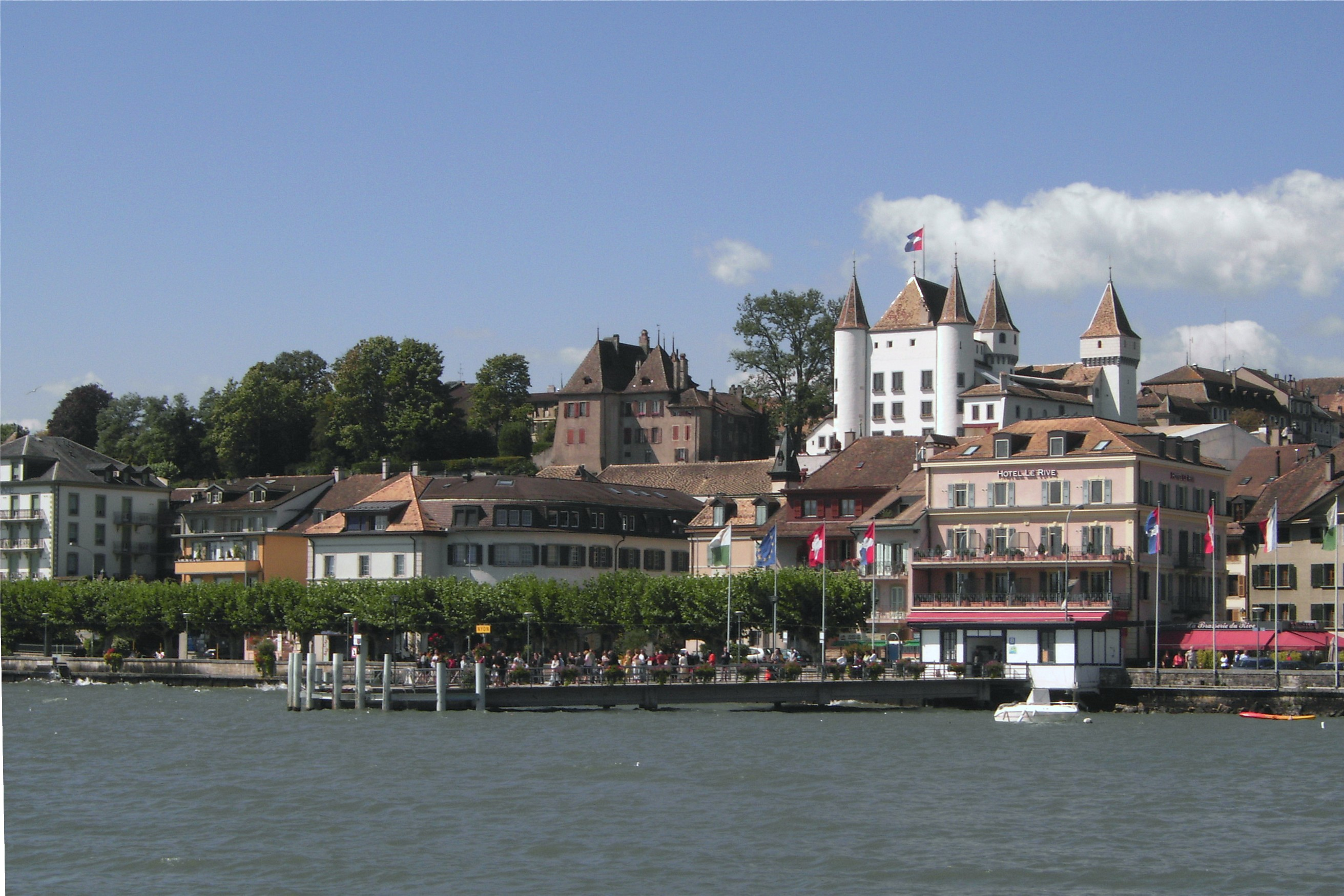
- Nyon in late August 2007

- Flag Coat of arms
- Location of Nyon
- Location within Switzerland Location within Canton of Vaud
- Coordinates: 46°23′N 6°14′E
- Country: Switzerland
- Canton: Vaud
- District: Nyon

Government
  - Executive: Municipalité with 7 members
  - Mayor: Syndic (list); Daniel Rossellat (as of February 2014)
  - Parliament: Conseil communal with 100 members

Area
  - Total: 6.82 km^{2} (2.63 sq mi)
- Elevation: 400.9 m (1,315 ft)

Population (December_2009)
  - Total: 23,407
  - Density: 3,430/km^{2} (8,890/sq mi)
- Time zone: UTC+01:00 (CET)
  - Summer (DST): UTC+02:00 (CEST)
- Postal code: 1260
- SFOS number: 5724
- ISO 3166 code: CH-VD
- Surrounded by: Crans-près-Céligny, Duillier, Eysins, Grens, Messery (FR-74), Prangins, Signy-Avenex, Trélex
- Twin towns: Nyons (France)
- Website: www.nyon.ch

Nyon (French pronunciation: [njɔ̃]; historically German: Neuis or Neuss and Italian: Nione, [ˈnjoːne]) is a municipality in Nyon District in the canton of Vaud in Switzerland. It is located some 25 kilometers north east of Geneva's city centre, and since the 1970s it has been part of the Geneva metropolitan area. It lies on the shores of Lake Geneva and is the seat of Nyon District. The town has (as of December 2020) a population of 21,718 and is famous in the sporting world for being the headquarters of the Union of European Football Associations (UEFA) and European Football Clubs (EFC). It is connected to the rest of Switzerland by way of the Route Suisse, the A1 motorway and the railways of the Arc Lémanique.

== Name ==
Nyon derives from one of the names used by the Romans for the town, Noviodunum or Noiodunum. Other names for the town, particularly of colonies placed there, are Colonia Iulia Equestris or Colonia Julia Equestris, Colonia Equestris Noiodunum, Equestris, Civitas Equestrium, and Civitas Equestrium Noiodunum.

== History ==
Nyon is first mentioned around 367–407 as civitas Equestrium id est Noiodunus (in the "Notitia Galliarum"). In 1236, it was mentioned as Neveduni and in 1292 as Nyons.

=== Pre-Roman settlements ===
A few scattered neolithic items were discovered in the 19th century. North of the city, some bronze rings and the ruins of a Bronze Age settlement were discovered.

=== Noviodunum ===
It was founded by the Romans between 50 and 44 BC under the name of Colonia Iulia Equestris or Colonia Equestris Noiodunum, the urban center of which was called Noviodunum. It grew to be one of the most important Roman colonies in modern-day Switzerland, with a forum, a basilica and an amphitheater that was discovered only recently, in 1996, when digging for the construction of a new building.

At Roman contact, the country round the town was held by the Helvetii. The town's importance is reflected in its numerous mentions in ancient sources. The Antonine Itineraries place the town on the road from Geneva to Lacus Lausonius (near Lausanne). It is first mentioned by Pliny (H.N., iv. 7), and then by Ptolemy (ii. 9), who assigns it to the Sequani. Pliny and Ptolemy simply name it Equestris; and so it is named in the Itineraries. On some inscriptions it is called Civ. Equestrium (short for Civitas Equestrium), and Col. Julia Equ. (short for Colonia Julia Equestris) from which some have concluded that it was founded by Julius Caesar. In the Notitia it is called Civ. Equestrium Noiodunum (short for Civitas Equestrium Noiodunum). The district in which Nyon stands is called Pagus Equestricus in a document of the year 1011; and it is said that the people of the country as of the 18th century still called this district Enquestre. (D'Anville, Notice, &c.; Walckenaer, Géographie, &c., des Gaules, vol. ii. p. 316.)

Noviodunum was part of a loose network of settlements that radiated out from Lugdunum (modern Lyon, France) and helped to control the Rhone Valley. It served, along with other Roman colonies in the area, to control the Helvetii who were settled in the area against their will after their defeat at the Battle of Bibracte in 58 BC.

A rectangular grid pattern divided the area of the wall-less city. A monumental center, housing everything needed for the economic, religious and social life of the colony, was established. Only portions of this first forum have been discovered. At its east end was a two-story basilica. Grid-like residential streets radiated out from the center.

Under Tiberius, the forum was expanded and redesigned into a familiar pattern for the provinces. The sacred area was surrounded on three sides by colonnades, which were built on half-sunken Cryptoporticus. Two outbuildings, including most likely the seat of the Curia, flanked the building. A market building (macellum) with a central courtyard around which were the sales rooms, and the baths (tepidarium with geometric shapes and mosaics) were renovated. The forum witnessed further transformations, particularly the establishment of another large building. During the same building phase a large mosaic on the central part of the north portico was built.

The amphitheater, which was discovered in 1996, was probably built in the early 2nd century AD. Its arena, which was flanked by two prisons and provided with sewers, is about 50 by 36 metres (164 by 118 ft). The ruins of the theater, that should have been in the Colonia, have not been discovered.

The residential quarters consisted of modest homes, in addition to some domi with gardens and pools. The buildings were originally made of wood and clay, but after the mid-1st century AD were built from masonry. Some villa suburbana stood in the west of the village, while the artisan and merchant quarter, presumably, developed in the southwest. A ten-kilometre-long (six-mile) aqueduct, which ran from the Divonne area to the colony, provided the water supply. Sewage canals, that followed the road networks, dumped sewage into the lake.

=== Decline of the Roman colonia ===
After a long period of peace and prosperity, signs of crisis and general insecurity were increasing in the early 3rd century. As a result of Alamanni invasions of 259 or 260 AD, the forum and the public buildings in the city were razed. The stone blocks were scattered all over the Lake Geneva region. The stones were re-used as building material, especially in Geneva, where about 300 were used in the construction of the wall. But the settlement was not abandoned. Nyon-Noviodunum, which had already lost much of its prestige and reputation was as a regional capital, now separated from Geneva. Geneva became the center and seat of the diocese which initially fought to administer the territory that had been part of the Colonia.

=== Medieval Nyon ===
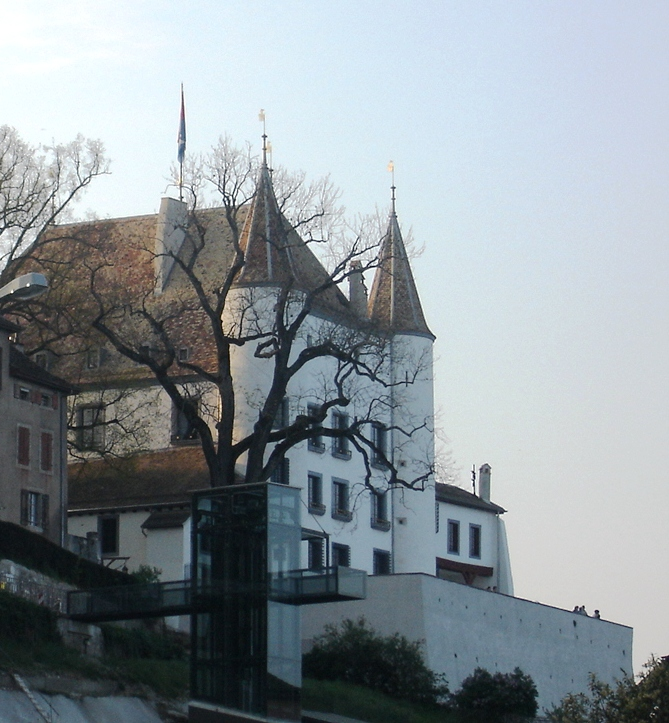
Nyon Castle

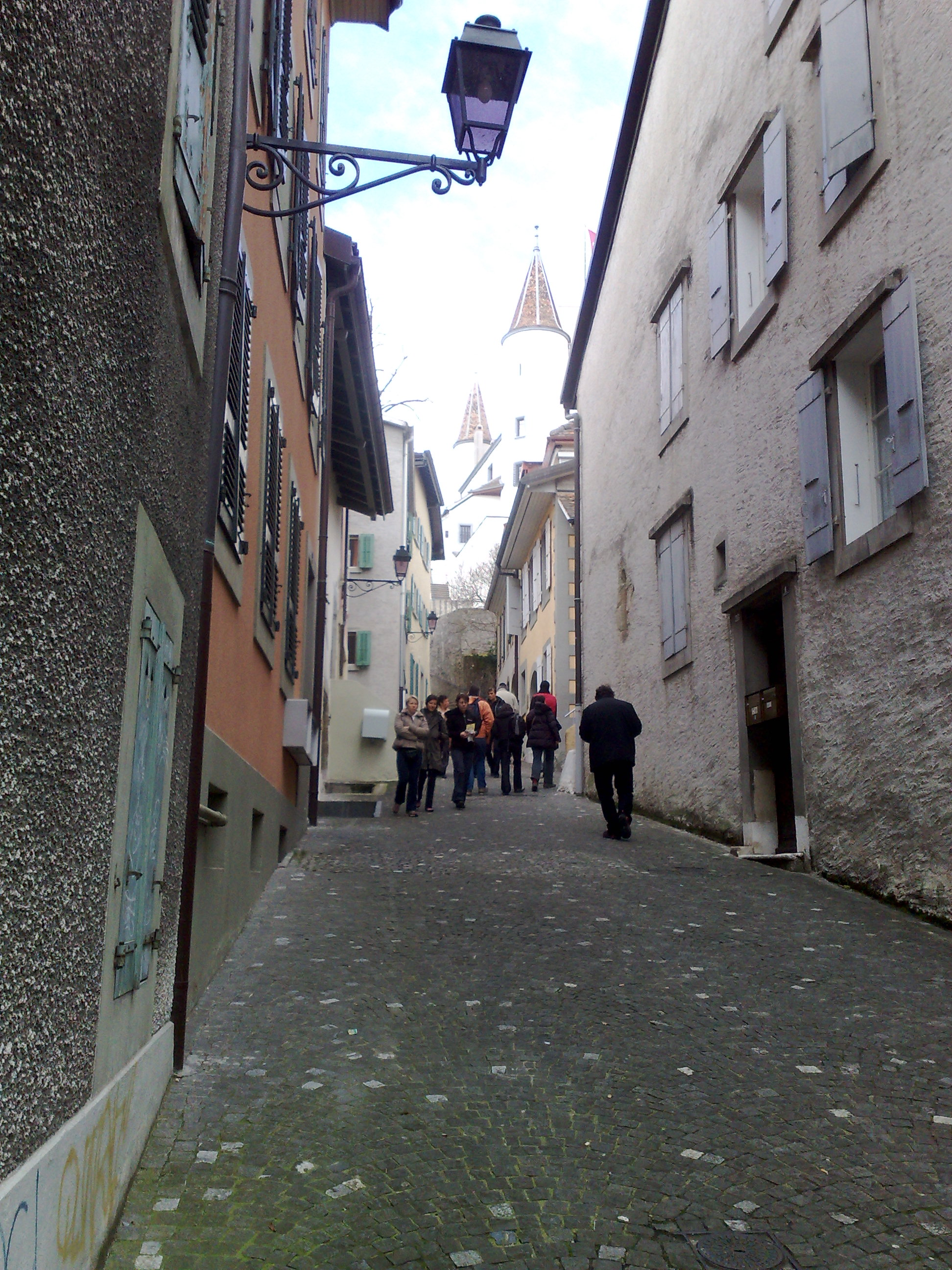
Narrow streets in Nyon

During the Carolingian era, Nyon belonged to the county of Geneva. In a 926 charter, Rudolph II of Burgundy mentioned that this area was under a comes de pago Equestrico. During the Second Kingdom of Burgundy, Nyon became independent from Geneva. In 1032, Rudolf III granted Nyon to the Archbishop of Besançon. The bishop granted Nyon to the Lord of Prangins as a fief. After 1130, Humbert de Cossonay, the Lord of Prangins, held his court in Nyon. A market was built in 1211. In 1272, the Archbishop of Besançon confirmed Philip of Savoy's right to administer high justice in Nyon. In 1279, Aymon of Prangins unsuccessfully rebelled against the counts of Savoy, but was forced to acknowledge Savoy authority over him and Nyon.

The Castle is first mentioned in 1272, but probably dates back to the Lords of Prangins. It was rebuilt by Louis I of Savoy in 1463. The rectangular edifice was built in a variety of styles. Around the same time, the square César Tower or Tour de Rive (now a residence), was built to defend the city.

In 1293, Amadeus V, Count of Savoy, and his brother Louis I, Baron of Vaud, conquered the city by besieging it from both the land and the lake. They confirmed the town rights which had been granted to Nyon by Aymon of Prangins, and extended further rights and freedoms. It became one of the four bonnes villes of Canton Vaud. In 1294, Louis I began to expand Nyon as a center of his power after Amadeus granted his share of the conquest to Louis. He created a court and a mint, which minted coins for the lords of Vaud between 1286 and 1350. In 1323 Louis II, granted the so-called mountains of Nyon, i.e. pastures and forests in the area of Arzier and Saint-Cergue, to Nyon. In 1359 Nyon lost importance after Amadeus VI acquired rights over the entire Vaud. In 1364 the town charter of Morges replaced the charter in Nyon. This change was reconfirmed in 1439. Under the new charter, the town gained greater self-sufficiency. The mint in Nyon reopened in 1430. In 1530 the Swiss Confederation invaded Vaud and acquired Nyon. Then in 1536, Nyon surrendered again to Bern without a fight as Bernese troops marched through to support Geneva.

Starting in 1323, the municipal government was composed of eight procurators and a mayor. A little later the government was replaced by a community meeting which was headed by two mayors (Syndics). The Town Hall is first mentioned in 1508.

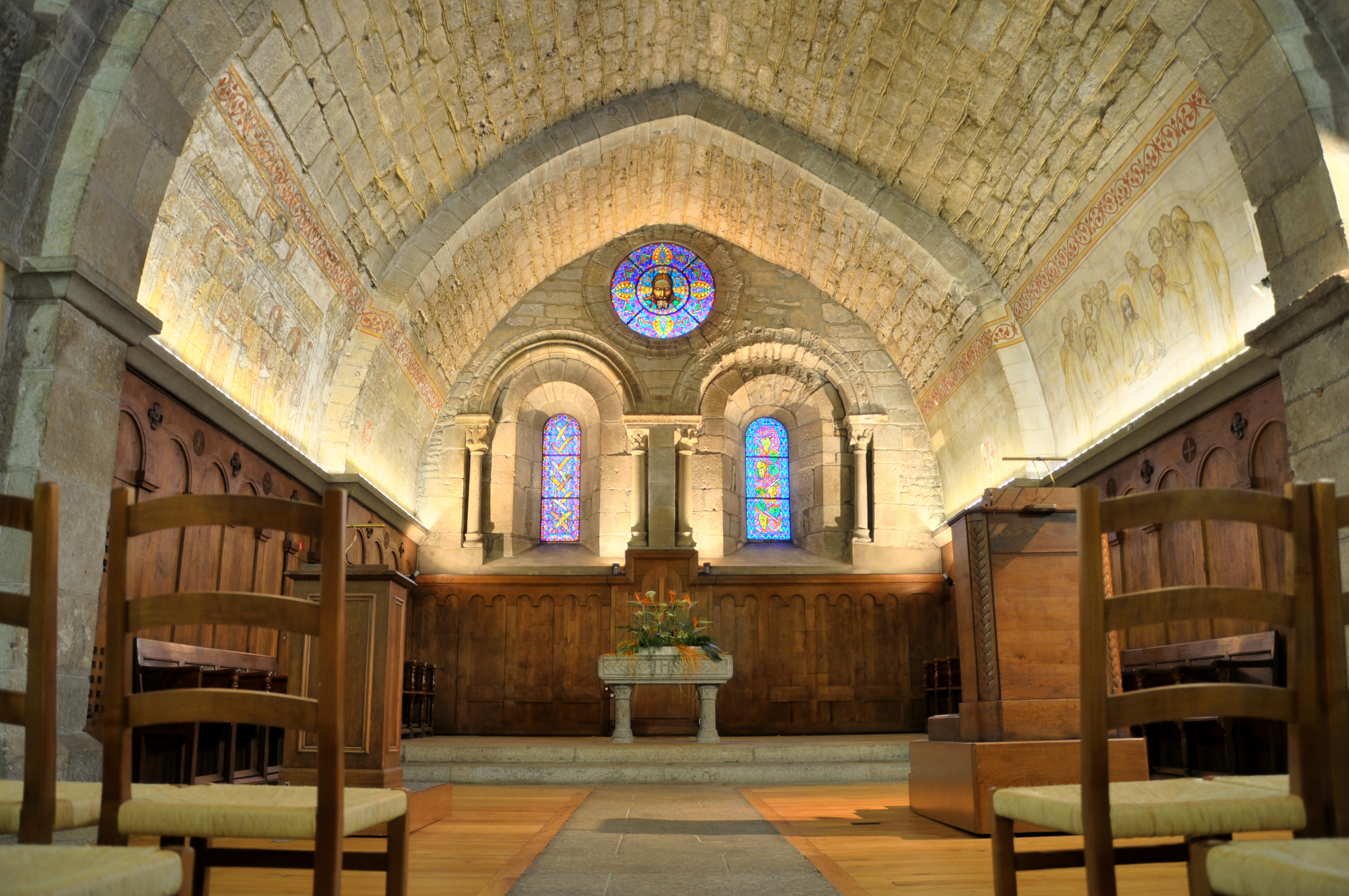
Interior of the Church of Notre-Dame

A Benedictine priory was founded in the first half of the 12th century in Nyon. In 1244 it was given to the Augustinian order. The last prior, before the Reformation in 1535 was Aymon de Gingins, who was also the abbot of Bonmont and the selected Bishop of Geneva.

In 1295–96, Louis I, Duke of Savoy, built a Franciscan monastery under the patronage of St. Francis, in which several members of the House of Savoy were buried. In 1530, Bern and Fribourg plundered the monastery for the first time, and Bern destroyed all the pictures of saints. In 1536, it was burned by the withdrawing Savoy garrison.

In 1110 Geneva granted authority over the church of Notre-Dame to the Benedictine abbey of Saint-Oyend (Saint-Claude). The church was built with material from the Roman period and replaced an earlier Christian church. The choir dates from the 12th century, and the nave was built in 1448. The vault and the side chapels were built in 1470–81.

Situated outside the city walls was the church of Saint-Jean-Baptiste, also known as Corps-Saints. The church is first mentioned in 1346. By 1412, it was administered by the Augustinian Priory. Until the Reformation it was a pilgrimage site where the relics of the martyrs of the Theban Legion were revered. Bern ordered the church destroyed in 1537.

=== Early Modern Nyon ===
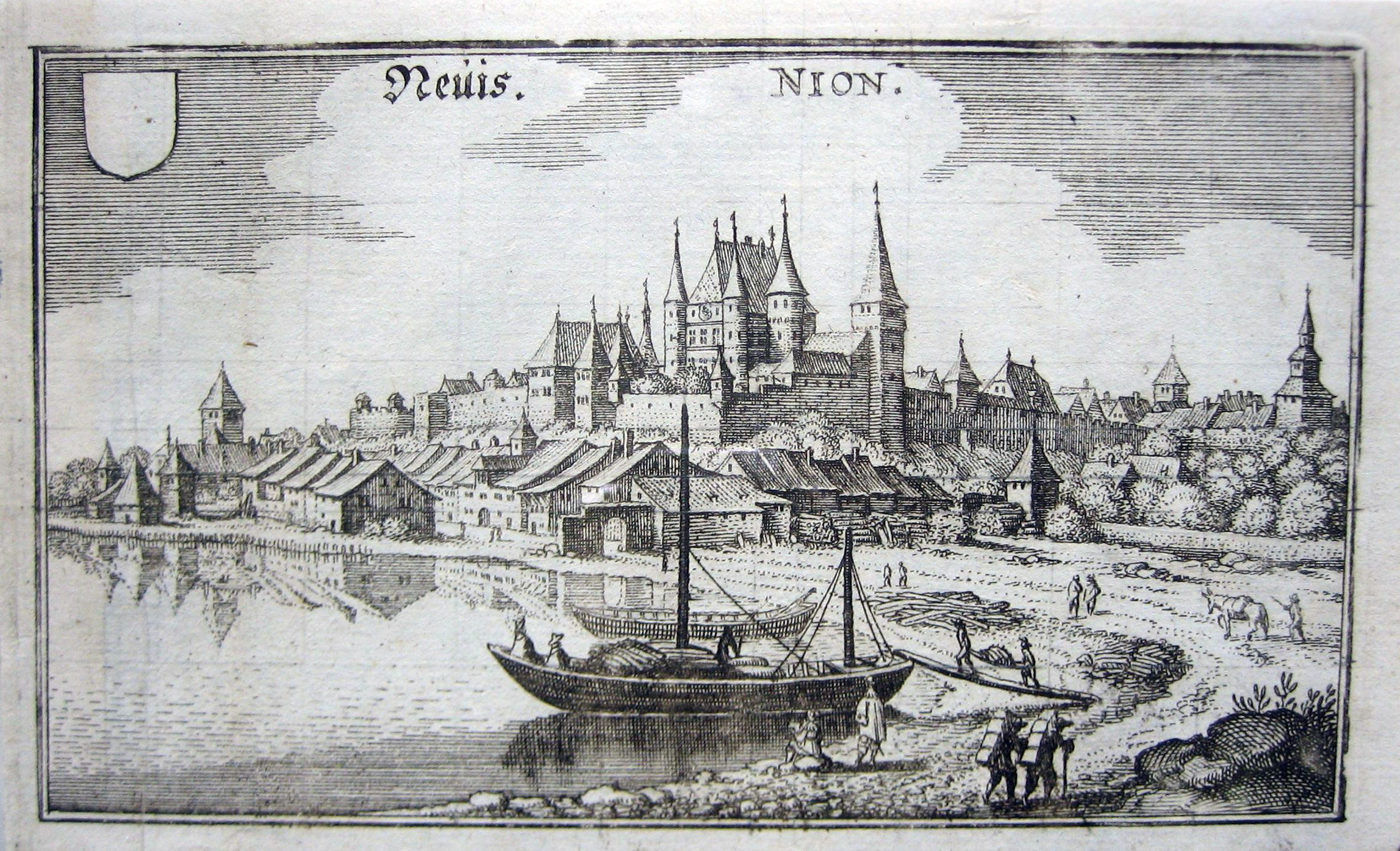
Nyon in 1642

Nyon was raised to the status of administrative center of a Vogtei of Bern in 1536. It remained the seat of the vogt until the Vaud revolution of 1798. In 1568, a yearly market took place for the first time. In 1574–80 the castle was converted into the seat of the bailiff. It was renovated several times in the following centuries. The municipal government added a Council of Fifty in 1558 and in 1578, an inner council of Twenty-four. The inner council was made up of nobles, burghers and inhabitants. Later the councils became a Council of Twelve and a council of Twenty-Four, which was headed by a knight banneret.

In 1570, Theodore Beza headed the regional assembly of Protestant refugee clergymen in Nyon. After the revocation of the Edict of Nantes in 1685, many Huguenots fled to Nyon. In 1688, they founded the Bourse française to help other refugees.

Nyon remained an important transhipment point for trade along Lake Geneva and from France and Italy. Grain and wood came from Burgundy and Franche-Comté through the Col de la Givrine and Saint-Cergue on to Geneva. In 1537–76, the customs post of Nyon was the most profitable in the bailiwick. Over the following centuries, trade through Nyon remained very profitable and by 1772–73, it was again the highest in the region. In the 18th century, trade and commerce grew strongly. The flow of goods allowed four (after 1738, five) yearly markets. A granary was built in the 18th century. The Bernese rebuilt the Asse canal system to drive tanneries, sawmills and mills. The Faïencerie Baylon earthenware factory was founded in 1769. It was followed by the Jacob Dortu and Ferdinand Müller porcelain factory in 1781, both of which contributed Nyon's reputation for fine ceramics.

With the profits of the Early Modern era, many of the public buildings of Nyon were rebuilt or expanded. Following the suppression of the monasteries, in 1539, the town hospital moved into the offices of the Augustinian convent and received money from the closed monasteries. Hans-Ulrich Heldt rebuilt the college, the original building was from 1559, in 1786 in a neoclassical style. The church of Notre-Dame was rebuilt several times between 1661 and 1718. The medieval city walls and gates were demolished in 1718. The town hall was rebuilt in 1773. In 1720, Louis de Saint-Georges, a minister of the English king, built Changins Castle.

The city was one of the most active centers of the revolutionary movement in the Vaud region. The councils of Nyon formed an oversight committee and refused to pay homage to Bern on 10 January 1798. A few days later, they secured the support of the French General Philippe Romain Ménard in support of the independence of Canton Vaud. When this proclamation of support was brought from Nyon to Lausanne, on 24 January 1798, it finally led to the Vaudois revolution.

From 1798 to 1803, it was in the canton of Léman of the Helvetic Republic as district capital.

=== Modern Nyon ===
In the first half of the 19th century, the city continued with the demolition of the fortifications, but left wall remains at the Promenade des Marronniers and by the tower of Notre Dame. During the 19th century the Reformed parish church was rebuilt several times. The Catholic Church was consecrated in 1839, and a chapel for the Église libre (Free Church) was finished in 1872.

In 1858, a station of the railway line Lausanne–Geneva was built in north of Nyon. New housing developments sprung up around this station, and the city began to spread. The railroads Nyon–Crassier–Divonne (1905) and Nyon–Saint-Cergue–Morez (1916) connected Nyon with its hinterland. To meet the needs of the economy, the shipping industry and the emerging tourism industry, a port was built in 1838 and a quay was added in 1873. By the middle of the 19th century, a major source of income was the sale of timber from the commons forest. Other industries included tanneries (closed in 1925), carpentry, saw mills (until 1935), mills (including Andre & Cie.), cooperages and a soap factory. The Faïencerie Baylon closed in 1828. The porcelain factory, Müller et Dortu temporarily closed in 1813, then resumed production of ceramics in the Art Nouveau style in 1878. From then on until 1980 they produced Stoneware. Other industries in Nyon include the pasta factory Sangal SA (1860–1996), Zyma (1906, since 1996, Swiss Novartis Consumer Health), Stellram (hard metal treatment, 1940–99), Cherix et Filanosa SA (printing and graphic arts, 1932) and several tool factories. Starting in 1966, the companies stopped using the local locks and dams for hydropower and by 1974 they had disappeared from the Asse river.

In 1937, it hosted the Nyon Conference.

== Current situation ==
Nyon has a high school (Gymnase de Nyon, known as CESSOuest until 1997 or 1998), a modern hospital, a movie theater, numerous hotels, restaurants, and cafes. The town is well known on the international stage as the home of the headquarters for UEFA, the governing body for football in Europe. It is also the seat of the international headquarters of the global union federation UNI Global Union. Nyon is also a major centre for the International Money-Broking Industry.

In July each year, Nyon hosts the Paléo Festival, the second largest outdoor festival in Europe (although technically the festival is in the village of L'Asse).

Nyon Rugby Club is one of the top rugby teams in Switzerland and is twinned with Ealing Rugby Club in West London.

Nyon also hosts Visions du Réel international film festival every April.

Nyon has been the regular host of the draws of the UEFA Champions League and UEFA Europa League as well as other UEFA Football competitions.

== Geography ==
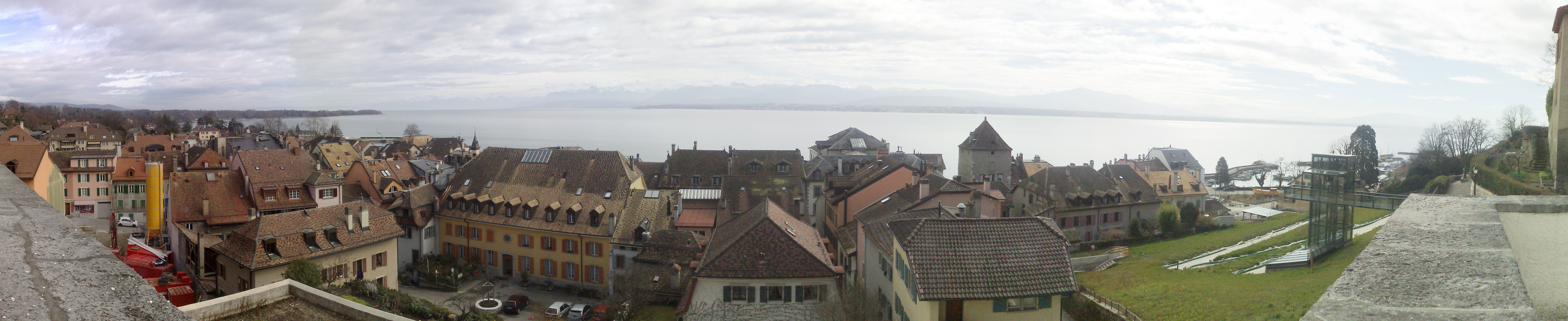
View of Nyon from Nyon Castle

Aerial view (1949)

Nyon has an area, as of 2009, of 6.8 square kilometers (2.6 mi^{2}). Of this area, 2.66 km^{2} (1.03 mi^{2}) or 39.2% is used for agricultural purposes, while 0.53 km^{2} (0.20 mi^{2}) or 7.8% is forested. Of the rest of the land, 3.67 km^{2} (1.42 mi^{2}) or 54.1% is settled (buildings or roads). Of the built up area, industrial buildings made up 5.9% of the total area while housing and buildings made up 27.4% and transportation infrastructure made up 14.1%. Power and water infrastructure as well as other special developed areas made up 2.1% of the area while parks, green belts and sports fields made up 4.6%. Out of the forested land, 5.6% of the total land area is heavily forested and 2.2% is covered with orchards or small clusters of trees. Of the agricultural land, 25.9% is used for growing crops and 4.7% is pastures, while 8.5% is used for orchards or vine crops.

The municipality was the capital of the old Nyon District until it was dissolved on 31 August 2006, and Nyon became the capital of the new district of Nyon.

The municipality is located between the Jura Mountains and Lake Geneva. The old core of Nyon, on the right bank of the Asse, is divided into the upper city (which was built on the Roman ruins on a hill) and the lower city along the water. Along the main thoroughfare a residential section developed to the east of the old city, and an industrial sector to the west.

=== Climate ===
Climate data for Nyon (Changins), elevation: elevation: 458 m (1,503 ft), 1991–2020 normals, extremes 1990–present
Month	Jan	Feb	Mar	Apr	May	Jun	Jul	Aug	Sep	Oct	Nov	Dec	Year
Record high °C (°F)	17.7 (63.9)	18.8 (65.8)	20.9 (69.6)	26.8 (80.2)	31.1 (88.0)	34.9 (94.8)	38.0 (100.4)	38.5 (101.3)	30.0 (86.0)	25.1 (77.2)	20.0 (68.0)	14.8 (58.6)	38.5 (101.3)
Mean daily maximum °C (°F)	4.5 (40.1)	6.1 (43.0)	10.9 (51.6)	15.0 (59.0)	19.2 (66.6)	23.2 (73.8)	25.6 (78.1)	25.1 (77.2)	20.2 (68.4)	14.7 (58.5)	8.7 (47.7)	5.1 (41.2)	14.9 (58.8)
Daily mean °C (°F)	1.9 (35.4)	2.7 (36.9)	6.6 (43.9)	10.2 (50.4)	14.2 (57.6)	18.0 (64.4)	20.1 (68.2)	19.6 (67.3)	15.5 (59.9)	11.0 (51.8)	5.9 (42.6)	2.7 (36.9)	10.7 (51.3)
Mean daily minimum °C (°F)	−0.7 (30.7)	−0.5 (31.1)	2.3 (36.1)	5.1 (41.2)	9.0 (48.2)	12.6 (54.7)	14.6 (58.3)	14.4 (57.9)	11.1 (52.0)	7.5 (45.5)	3.0 (37.4)	0.1 (32.2)	6.5 (43.7)
Record low °C (°F)	−11.0 (12.2)	−13.0 (8.6)	−10.1 (13.8)	−4.3 (24.3)	0.3 (32.5)	4.2 (39.6)	7.5 (45.5)	7.3 (45.1)	3.3 (37.9)	−2.6 (27.3)	−7.5 (18.5)	−13.7 (7.3)	−13.7 (7.3)
Average precipitation mm (inches)	81.9 (3.22)	63.3 (2.49)	64.5 (2.54)	66.7 (2.63)	86.2 (3.39)	83.6 (3.29)	84.1 (3.31)	84.0 (3.31)	85.6 (3.37)	98.5 (3.88)	95.7 (3.77)	99.5 (3.92)	993.6 (39.12)
Average precipitation days (≥ 1.0 mm)	10.1	8.1	8.3	8.5	10.9	9.5	9.0	8.7	7.8	10.0	10.1	10.4	111.4
Average relative humidity (%)	81	75	68	66	69	67	65	68	73	80	82	82	73
Mean monthly sunshine hours	71.6	108.1	171.4	193.1	214.0	242.6	266.3	243.8	192.6	127.4	74.2	55.8	1,960.9
Percentage possible sunshine	28	40	50	51	50	56	61	60	55	41	28	23	47
Source 1: NOAA
Source 2: MeteoSwiss infoclimat.fr

== Coat of arms ==
The blazon of the municipal coat of arms is Per pale Gules and Azure, overall a Fish nainaint Argent.

== Demographics ==
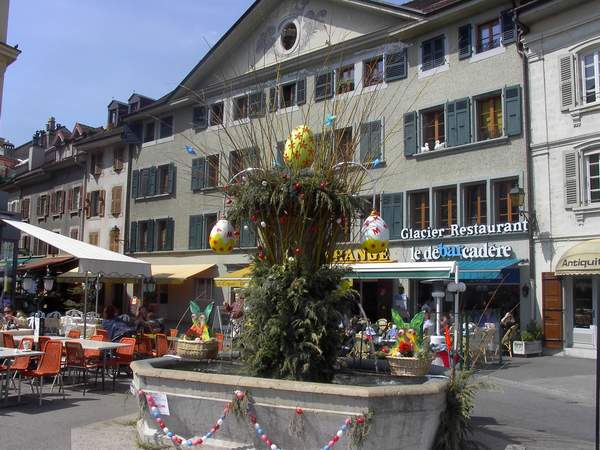
Fountain in old Nyon

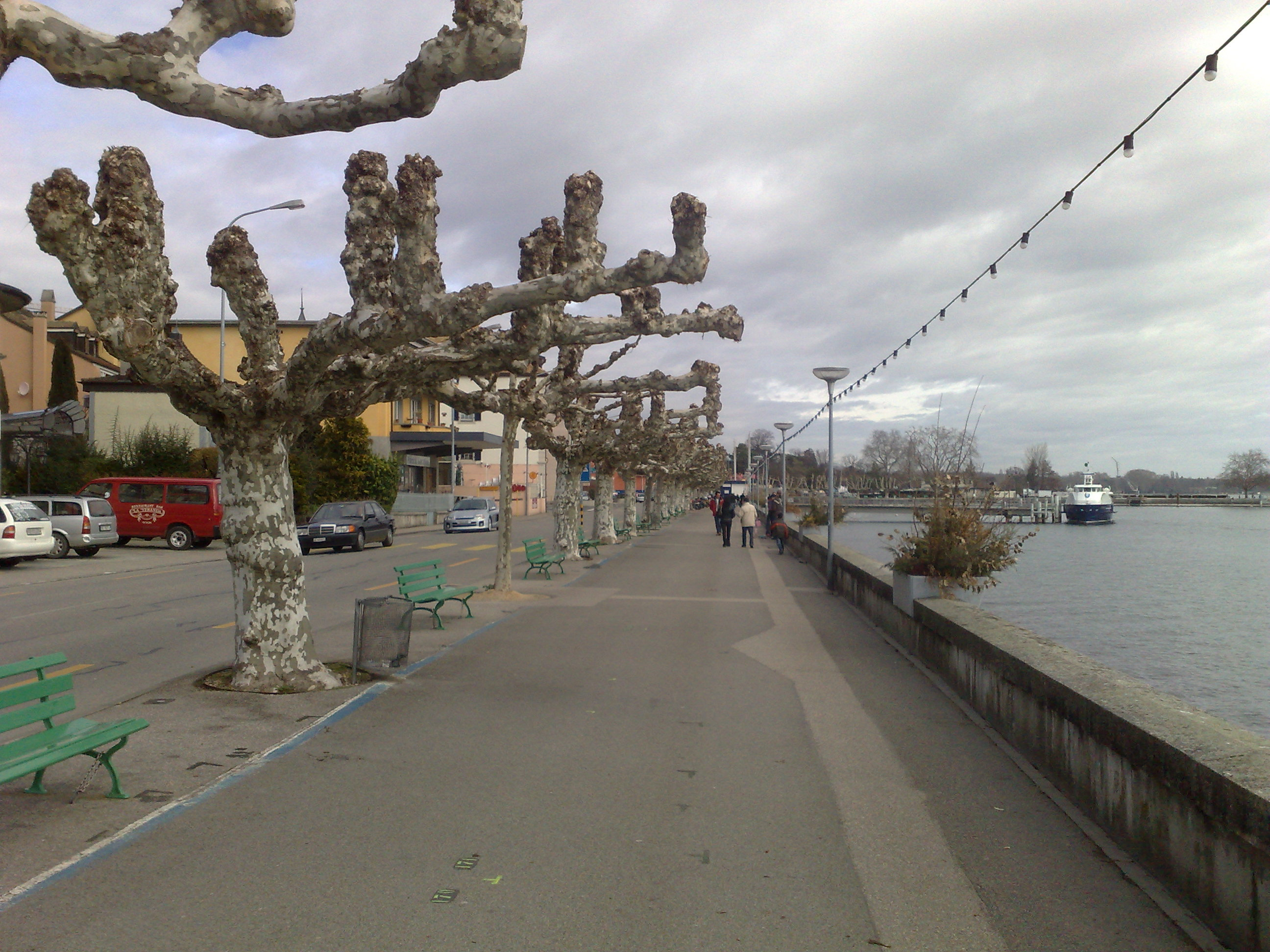
Lake front in Nyon

Nyon has a population (as of December 2020) of 21,718. As of 2008, 38.0% of the population are resident foreign nationals. Over the last 10 years (1999–2009) the population has changed at a rate of 16.8%. It has changed at a rate of 9.7% due to migration and at a rate of 7.7% due to births and deaths.

Most of the population (as of 2000) speak French (12,274 or 75.8%), with German being second most common (918 or 5.7%) and English being third (647 or 4.0%). There are 565 people who speak Italian and 9 people who speak Romansh.

The age distribution, as of 2009, in Nyon is; 2,015 children or 11.2% of the population are between 0 and 9 years old and 1,828 teenagers or 10.1% are between 10 and 19. Of the adult population, 2,304 people or 12.8% of the population are between 20 and 29 years old. 3,150 people or 17.4% are between 30 and 39, 3,051 people or 16.9% are between 40 and 49, and 2,187 people or 12.1% are between 50 and 59. The senior population distribution is 1,757 people or 9.7% of the population are between 60 and 69 years old, 1,045 people or 5.8% are between 70 and 79, there are 595 people or 3.3% who are between 80 and 89, and there are 130 people or 0.7% who are 90 and older.

As of 2000, there were 6,796 people who were single and never married in the municipality. There were 7,538 married individuals, 768 widows or widowers and 1,080 individuals who are divorced.

As of 2000, there were 7,307 private households in the municipality, and an average of 2.2 persons per household. There were 2,818 households that consist of only one person and 342 households with five or more people. Out of a total of 7,450 households that answered this question, 37.8% were households made up of just one person and there were 27 adults who lived with their parents. Of the rest of the households, there are 1,785 married couples without children, 2,053 married couples with children. There were 493 single parents with a child or children. There were 131 households that were made up of unrelated people and 143 households that were made up of some sort of institution or another collective housing.

In 2000 there were 650 single family homes (or 40.1% of the total) out of a total of 1,621 inhabited buildings. There were 621 multifamily buildings (38.3%), along with 235 multi-purpose buildings that were mostly used for housing (14.5%) and 115 other use buildings (commercial or industrial) that also had some housing (7.1%).

In 2000, a total of 7,072 apartments (86.2% of the total) were permanently occupied, while 1,028 apartments (12.5%) were seasonally occupied and 105 apartments (1.3%) were empty. As of 2009, the construction rate of new housing units was 5 new units per 1000 residents. The vacancy rate for the municipality, in 2010, was 0.13%.

The historical population is given in the following chart:

== Heritage sites of national significance ==
Nyon Castle and the Museum of the History of Porcelain, the Roman Colonia Iulia Equestris, the Swiss Reformed Church of Notre-Dame, the Manoir at Rue Maupertuis 2 & 4, the Roman Museum and the Union of European Football Associations (UEFA) are listed as Swiss heritage site of national significance. The entire old city of Nyon is part of the Inventory of Swiss Heritage Sites.

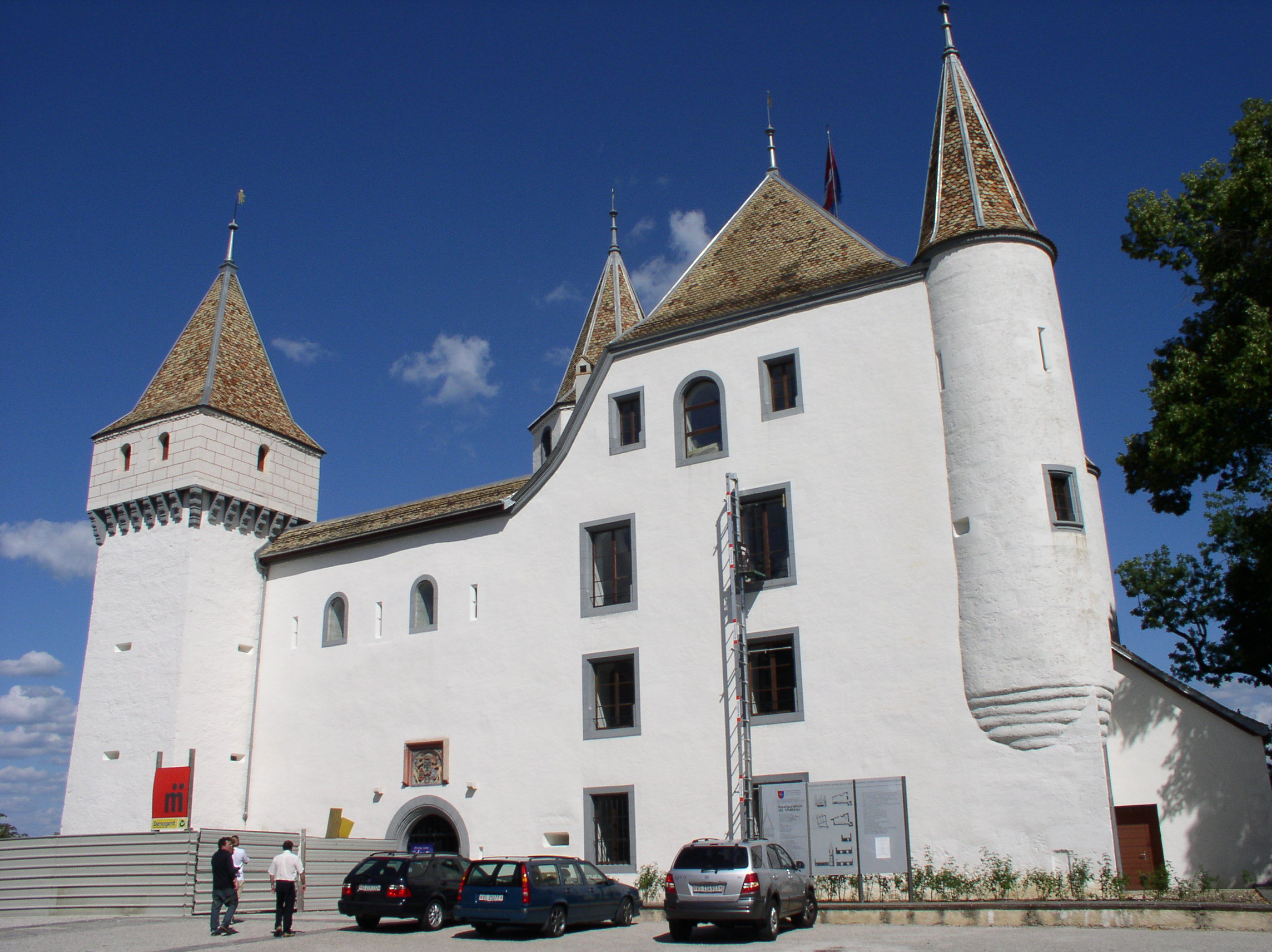
Nyon Castle

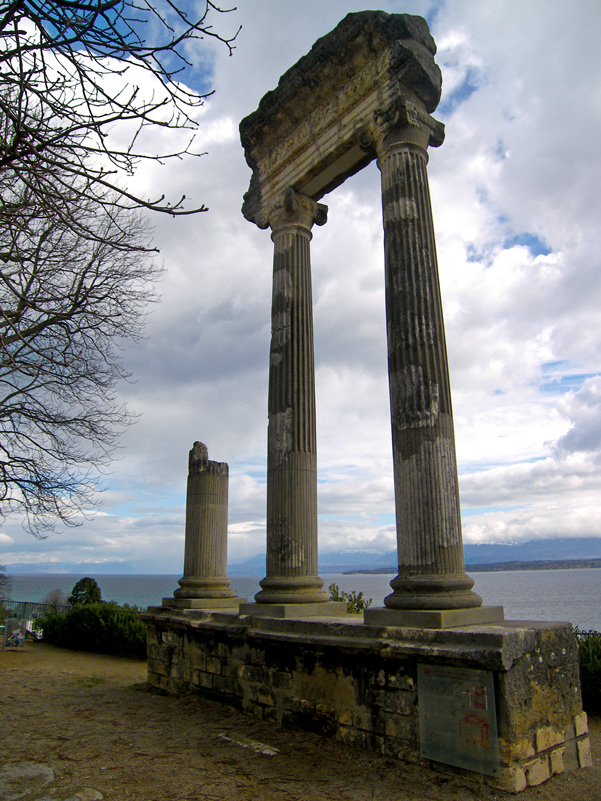
Colonia Iulia Equestris

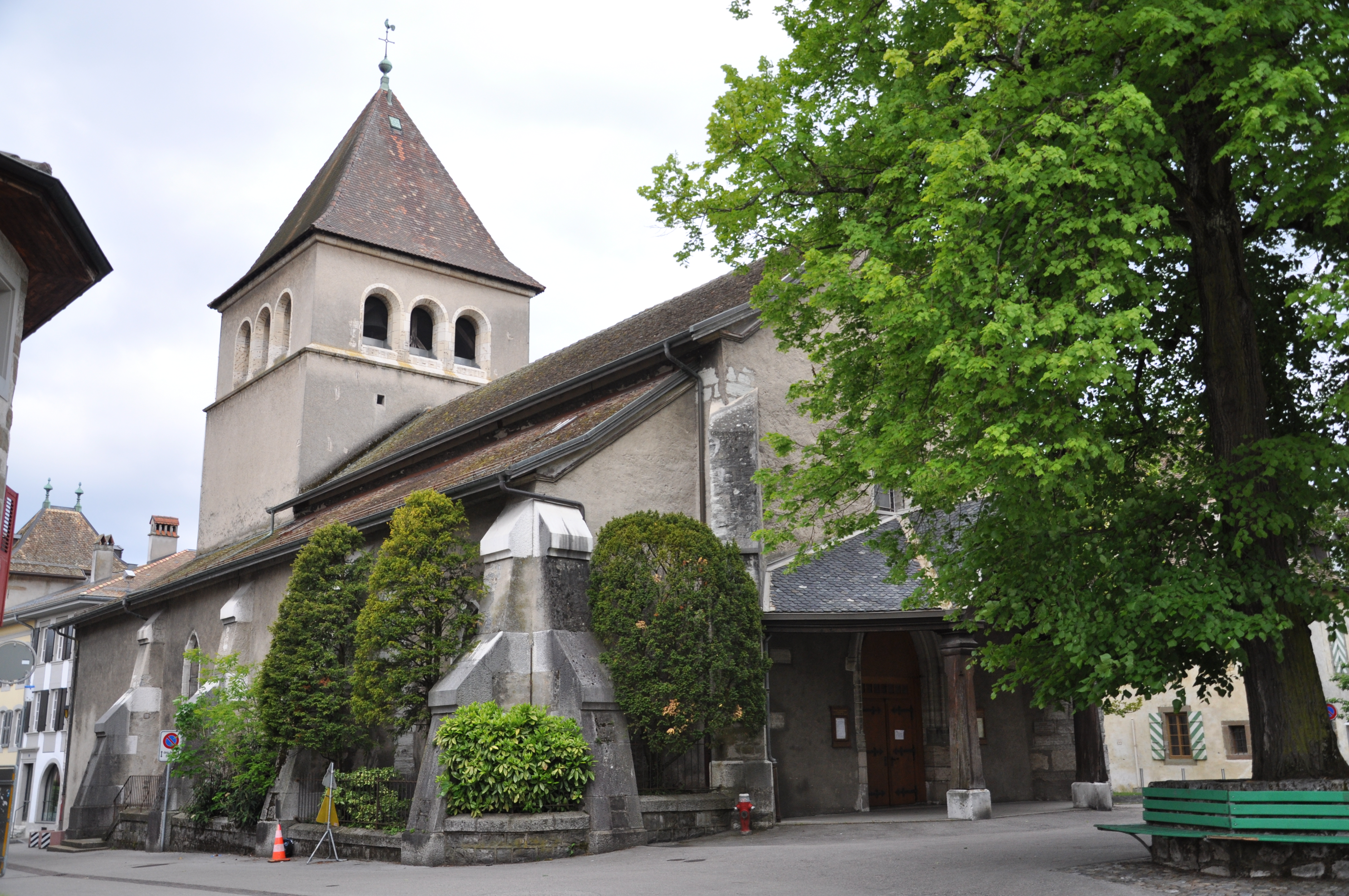
Reformed church of Notre-Dame

== Politics ==
In the 2023 Swiss federal election the most popular party was the SP which received 26.5% of the vote. The next three most popular parties were the FDP (21%), the Green Party (16.5%) and the SVP (14.3%).

== Economy ==
Glénat's Swiss subsidiary has its headquarters in Nyon. Cantor Fitzgerald has an office in Nyon. Edwards Lifesciences opened the regional headquarters and training center in Nyon in 2009.

As of 2010, Nyon had an unemployment rate of 6%. As of 2008, there were 49 people employed in the primary economic sector and about 13 businesses involved in this sector. 1,331 people were employed in the secondary sector and there were 153 businesses in this sector. 10,644 people were employed in the tertiary sector, with 1,131 businesses in this sector. There were 8,631 residents of the municipality who were employed in some capacity, of which females made up 46.0% of the workforce.

In 2008 the total number of full-time equivalent jobs was 10,337. The number of jobs in the primary sector was 39, of which 35 were in agriculture, 2 were in forestry or lumber production and 2 were in fishing or fisheries. The number of jobs in the secondary sector was 1,264 of which 600 or (47.5%) were in manufacturing and 588 (46.5%) were in construction. The number of jobs in the tertiary sector was 9,034. In the tertiary sector; 1,592 or 17.6% were in wholesale or retail sales or the repair of motor vehicles, 281 or 3.1% were in the movement and storage of goods, 493 or 5.5% were in a hotel or restaurant, 400 or 4.4% were in the information industry, 1,414 or 15.7% were the insurance or financial industry, 1,499 or 16.6% were technical professionals or scientists, 595 or 6.6% were in education and 1,150 or 12.7% were in health care.

In 2000, there were 7,415 workers who commuted into the municipality and 5,234 workers who commuted away. The municipality is a net importer of workers, with about 1.4 workers entering the municipality for every one leaving. About 12.1% of the workforce coming into Nyon are coming from outside Switzerland, while 0.1% of the locals commute out of Switzerland for work. Of the working population, 26.7% used public transportation to get to work, and 50.6% used a private car.

== Religion ==
From the 2000 census, 6,121 or 37.8% were Roman Catholic, while 4,522 or 27.9% belonged to the Swiss Reformed Church. Of the rest of the population, there were 174 members of an Orthodox church (or about 1.08% of the population), there were 17 individuals (or about 0.11% of the population) who belonged to the Christian Catholic Church, and there were 936 individuals (or about 5.78% of the population) who belonged to another Christian church. There were 32 individuals (or about 0.20% of the population) who were Jewish, and 750 (or about 4.63% of the population) who were Muslim. There were 63 individuals who were Buddhist, 98 individuals who were Hindu and 29 individuals who belonged to another church. 2,893 (or about 17.88% of the population) belonged to no church, were agnostic or atheist, and 996 individuals (or about 6.15% of the population) did not answer the question.

== Education ==
In Nyon about 5,216 or (32.2%) of the population have completed non-mandatory upper secondary education, and 3,009 or (18.6%) have completed additional higher education (either university or a Fachhochschule). Of the 3,009 who completed tertiary schooling, 36.4% were Swiss men, 27.4% were Swiss women, 20.4% were non-Swiss men and 15.7% were non-Swiss women.

In the 2009/2010 school year there were a total of 1,867 students in the Nyon school district. In the Vaud cantonal school system, two years of non-obligatory pre-school are provided by the political districts. During the school year, the political district provided pre-school care for a total of 1,249 children of which 563 children (45.1%) received subsidized pre-school care. The canton's primary school program requires students to attend for four years. There were 995 students in the municipal primary school program. The obligatory lower secondary school program lasts for six years and there were 806 students in those schools. There were also 66 students who were home schooled or attended another non-traditional school.

Nyon is home to three museums; the Musée historique, the Musée du Léman and the Musée romain. In 2009 the Musée historique was visited by 14,164 visitors (the average in previous years was 26,194). In 2009 the Musée du Léman was visited by 20,596 visitors (the average in previous years was 23,020). In 2009 the Musée romain, was closed for renovations but in previous years it had an average of 9,225 visitors.

As of 2000, there were 1,582 students in Nyon who came from another municipality, while 415 residents attended schools outside the municipality.

Nyon is home to 2 libraries; the Bibliothèque municipale de Nyon and the École d'ingénieurs de Changins. There was a combined total (as of 2008) of 53,262 books or other media in the libraries, and in the same year a total of 117,481 items were loaned out.

Collège Champittet, an international school, has its Nyon campus in the commune.

== Sports ==
Nyon is home to FC Stade Nyonnais, who play in the Swiss Challenge League, and their ground Colovray Sports Centre.

Nyon Rugby Club is one of the most successful rugby teams in Switzerland, regularly ending top of their leagues in both the first and second teams leagues, they also have a third team, youth, ladies and veterans side and also are based at the Colovray Centre.

Nyon Basket Feminin is based in Nyon. Nyon Basket plays in SB League Women, the top-tier women's professional basketball league in Switzerland.

=== UEFA ===
Nyon is famous for being the headquarters of the Union of European Football Associations (UEFA) and the European Club Association (ECA). The UEFA organises their sanctioned national team and club competitions and regulates the national football associations across Europe, South Caucasus, Turkey, Cyprus, Israel and Kazakhstan and its competitions, and the ECA regulates UEFA-affiliated member clubs from every associations.

== Notable people ==
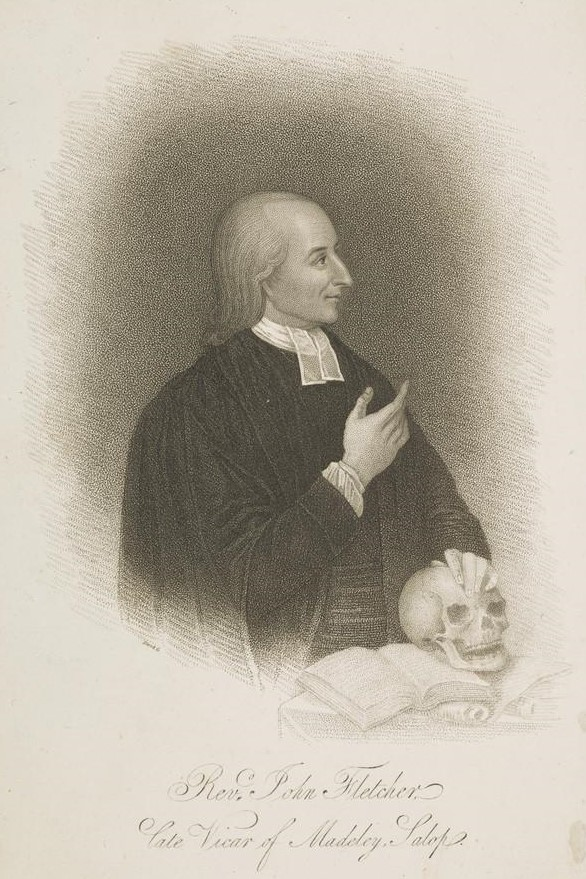
Rev. John Fletcher

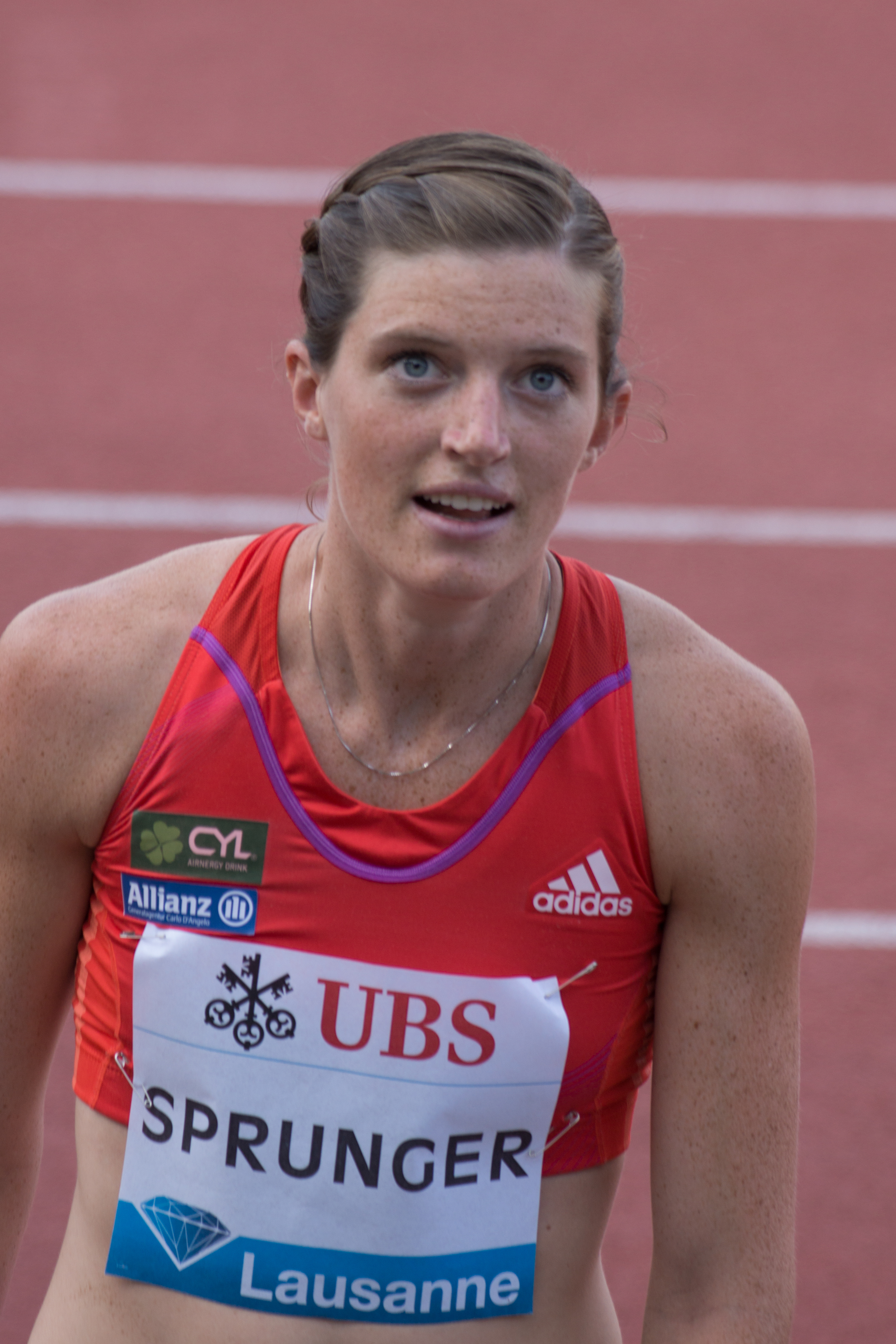
Léa Sprunger, 2012

- John William Fletcher (1729–1785), an English divine
- André Haefliger (born in 1929), a Swiss mathematician
- Louis Niedermeyer (1802–1861), a composer of church music, a few operas and a teacher
- Louis Ruffet (1836–1923), a Swiss Protestant theologian and church historian
- Édouard Rod (1857–1910), a French–Swiss novelist
- Alfred Cortot (1877–1962), a Franco-Swiss pianist, conductor and teacher
- Louis Mercanton (1879–1932), a Swiss film director, screenwriter and actor
- Nina Simone (1933–2003), an American singer, songwriter, pianist, lived in Nyon around 1988
- Béatrice Graf (born in 1964), percussionist, organist and keyboard player of jazz fusion and modern jazz
- Jonas Kocher (born in 1977), an accordionist, musician and composer
- Gaël Monfils (born in 1986), a French professional tennis player
- Kevin Fickentscher (born in 1988), a Swiss professional football goalkeeper, over 100 club caps
- Léa Sprunger (born in 1990), track and field athlete, competed at the 2012 and the 2016 Summer Olympics

== Transport ==
Nyon is the starting station for the Nyon–St-Cergue–Morez Railway, as well as being on the main Geneva to Lausanne Swiss Federal Railways line.

The A1 motorway runs nearby and Nyon is served by Junction 11.
