= Ballens-Froideville railway station =

Railway station in Ballens, Switzerland

Ballens-Froideville
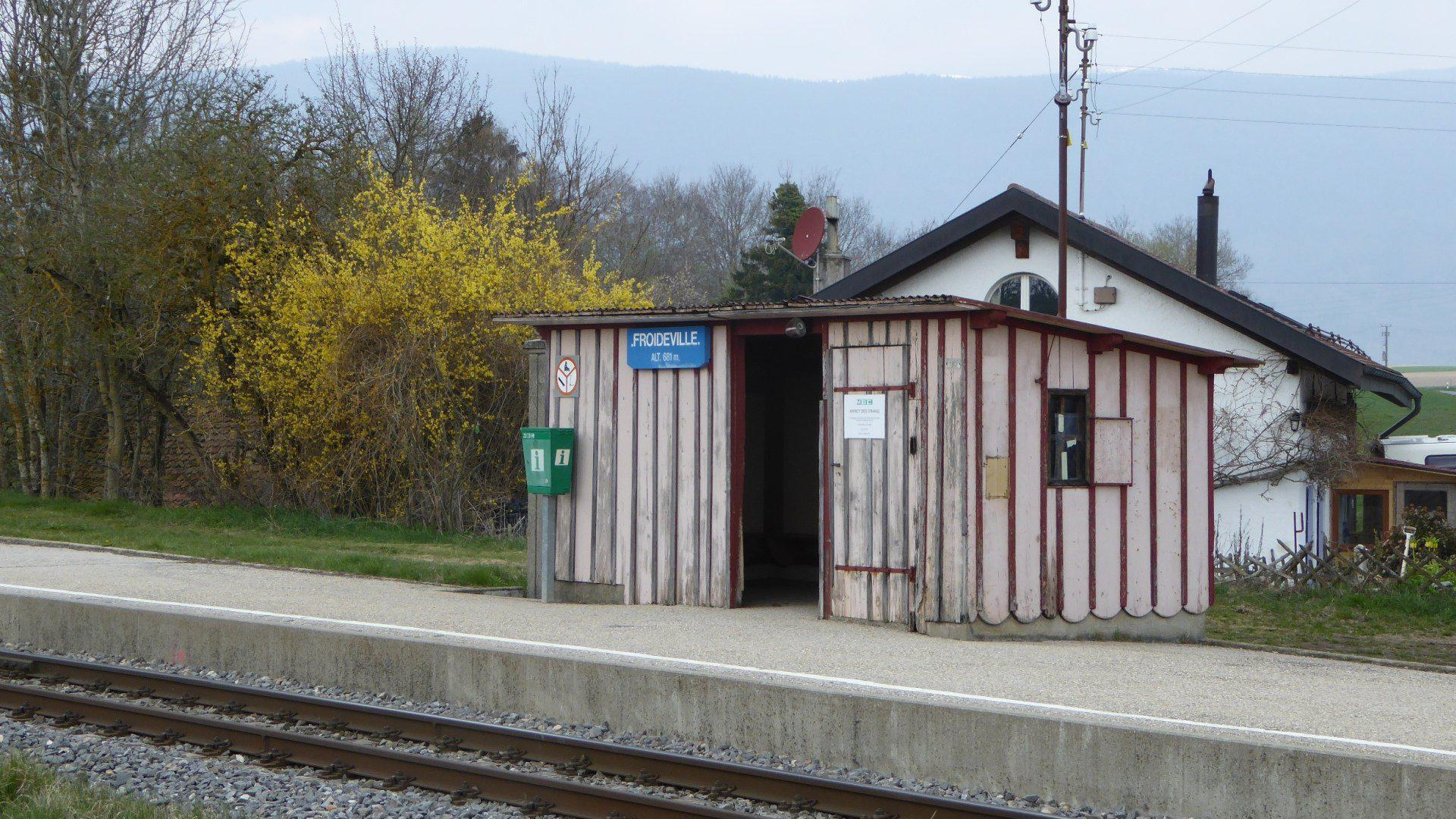
- Ballens-Froideville railway station in 2019

General information
- Location: Ballens, Vaud; Switzerland
- Coordinates: 46°33′N 6°23′E
- Elevation: 681 m (2,234 ft)
- Owner: Transports de la région Morges-Bière-Cossonay
- Line: Bière–Apples–Morges line
- Distance: 14.2 km (8.8 mi) from Morges
- Platforms: 1 (1 side platform)
- Tracks: 1
- Train operators: Transports de la région Morges-Bière-Cossonay

Construction
- Accessible: Yes

Other information
- Station code: 8501085 (FRD)
- Fare zone: 36 (mobilis)

History
- Opened: 1 July 1895
- Former names: Froideville (until 2009)

Services
Preceding station	MBC	Following station
Ballens towards Bière	R56	Apples towards Morges
Location

Ballens-Froideville railway station (French: Gare de Ballens-Froideville), is a railway station in the municipality of Ballens, in the Swiss canton of Vaud. It is an intermediate stop and a request stop on the 1,000 mm (3 ft 3 3/8 in) metre gauge Bière–Apples–Morges line of Transports de la région Morges-Bière-Cossonay.

== Services ==
As of the December 2023 timetable change, the following services stop at Ballens-Froideville:

- Regio: half-hourly service (hourly on weekends) between Morges and Bière.

== Bibliography ==
- Wägli, Hans G.; Jacobi, Sébastien (2010). Schienennetz Schweiz - Bahnprofil Schweiz CH+ [Swiss rail network] (in German) (3rd ed.). Zürich: AS Verlag. ISBN 978-3-909111-74-9.
