= Yens railway station =

Railway station in Yens, Switzerland

Yens
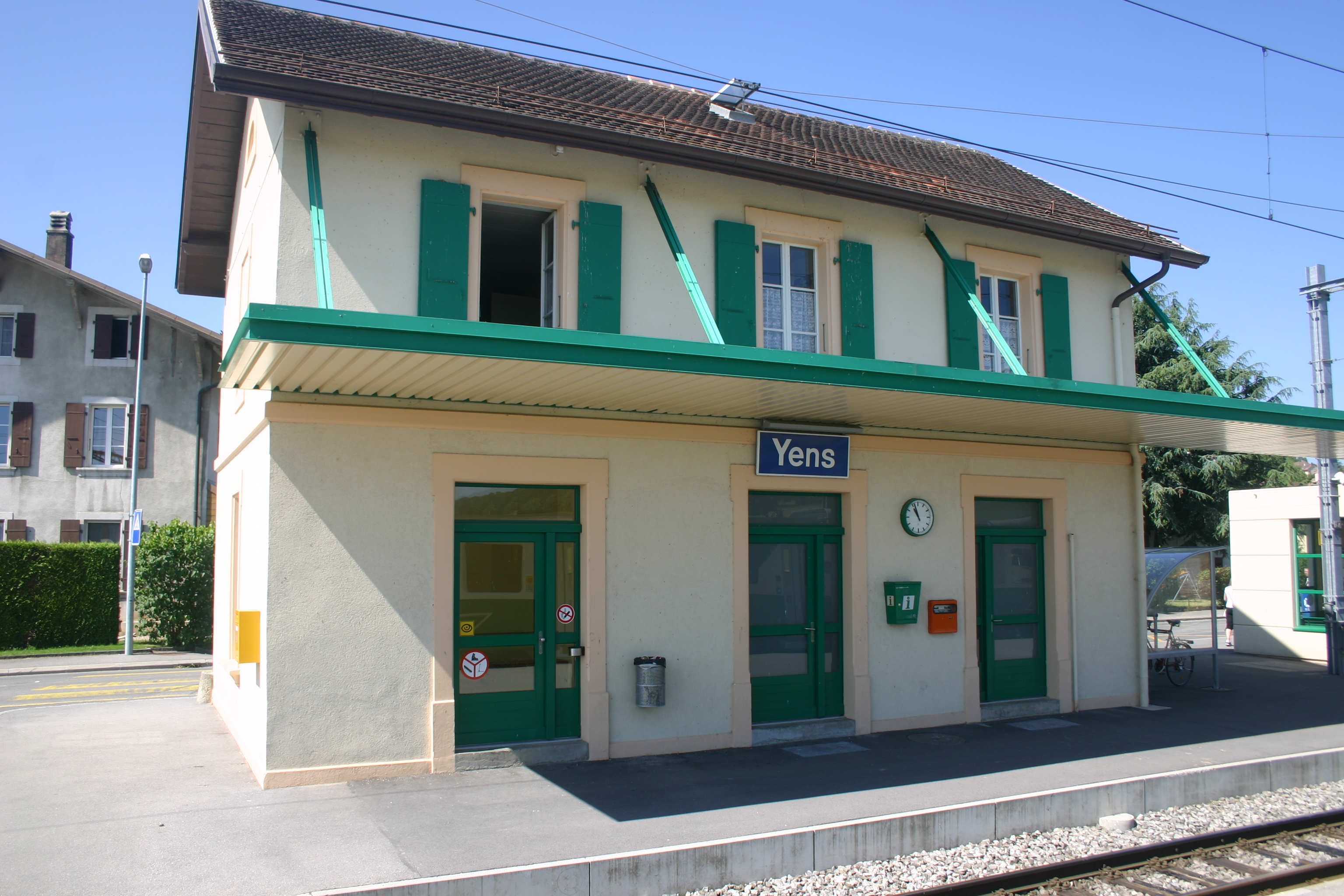
- The station building in 2008

General information
- Location: Yens, Vaud; Switzerland
- Coordinates: 46°31′12″N 6°25′37″E
- Elevation: 527 m (1,729 ft)
- Owner: Transports de la région Morges-Bière-Cossonay
- Line: Bière–Apples–Morges line
- Distance: 7.5 km (4.7 mi) from Morges
- Platforms: 2 (2 side platforms)
- Tracks: 2
- Train operators: Transports de la région Morges-Bière-Cossonay
- Connections: CarPostal SA bus line

Construction
- Accessible: Yes

Other information
- Station code: 8501093 (YENS)
- Fare zone: 34 (mobilis)

History
- Opened: 1 July 1895

Services
Preceding station	MBC	Following station
Chardonney-Château towards Bière	R56	Bussy-Chardonney towards Morges
Location

Yens railway station (French: Gare de Yens), is a railway station in the municipality of Yens, in the Swiss canton of Vaud. It is an intermediate stop on the 1,000 mm (3 ft 3 3/8 in) metre gauge Bière–Apples–Morges line of Transports de la région Morges-Bière-Cossonay.

== Services ==
As of the December 2024 timetable change, the following services stop at Yens:

- Regio: half-hourly service (hourly on weekends) between Morges and Bière.

== Bibliography ==
- Wägli, Hans G.; Jacobi, Sébastien (2010). Schienennetz Schweiz - Bahnprofil Schweiz CH+ [Swiss rail network] (in German) (3rd ed.). Zürich: AS Verlag. ISBN 978-3-909111-74-9.
