= Le Marais railway station =

Railway station in Vufflens-le-Château, Switzerland

Le Marais
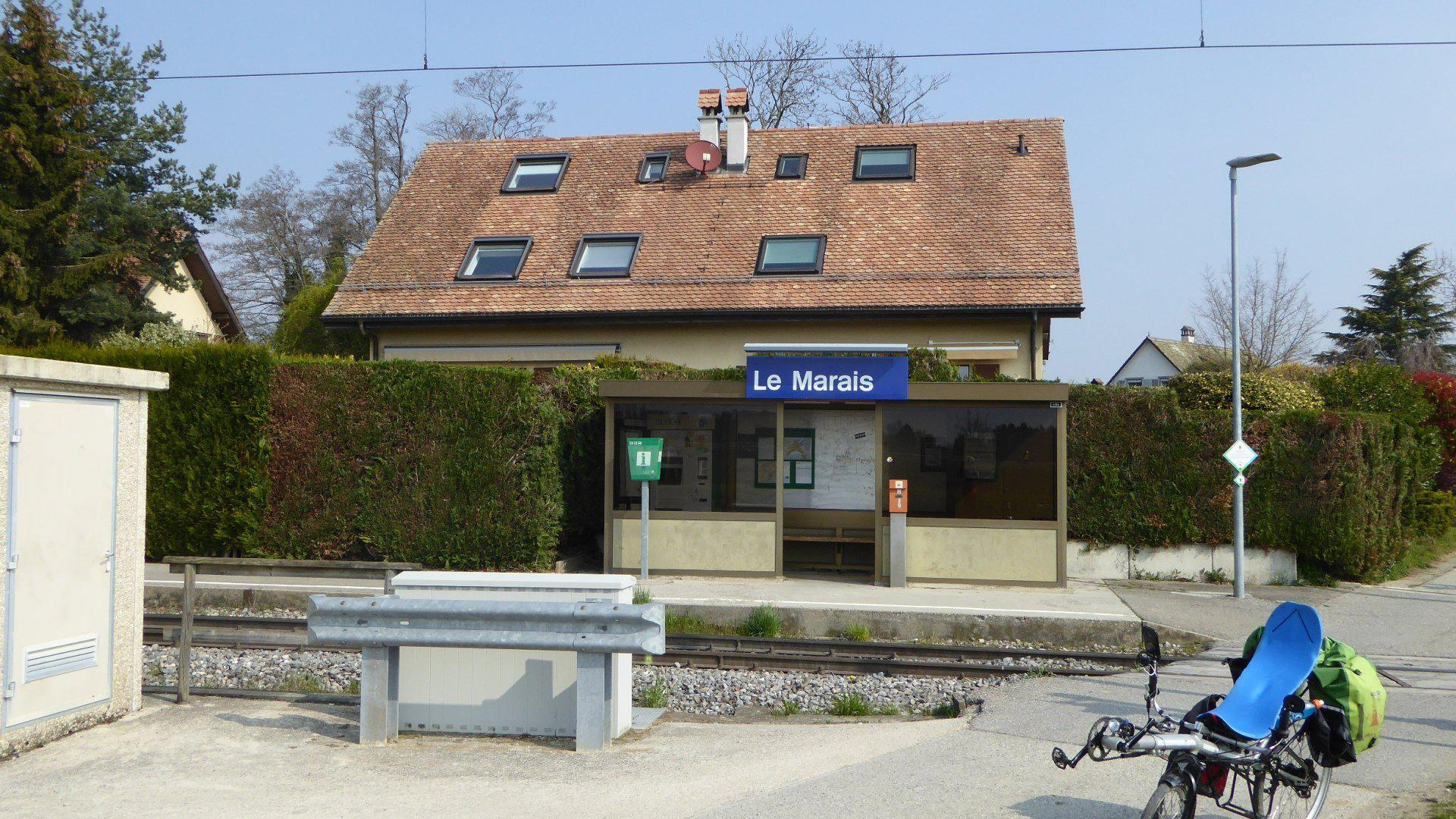

General information
- Location: Vufflens-le-Château, Vaud; Switzerland
- Coordinates: 46°31′37″N 6°27′47″E
- Elevation: 495 m (1,624 ft)
- Owner: Transports de la région Morges-Bière-Cossonay
- Line: Bière–Apples–Morges line
- Distance: 4.5 km (2.8 mi) from Morges
- Platforms: 1 (1 side platform)
- Tracks: 1
- Train operators: Transports de la région Morges-Bière-Cossonay

Construction
- Accessible: Yes

Other information
- Station code: 8501080 (MARA)
- Fare zone: 31 (mobilis)

History
- Opened: 1 July 1895

Services
Preceding station	MBC	Following station
Bussy-Chardonney towards Bière	R56	Vufflens-le-Château towards Morges
Location

Le Marais railway station (French: Gare de Le Marais), is a railway station in the municipality of Vufflens-le-Château, in the Swiss canton of Vaud. It is an intermediate stop and a request stop on the 1,000 mm (3 ft 3 3/8 in) metre gauge Bière–Apples–Morges line of Transports de la région Morges-Bière-Cossonay.

== Services ==
As of the December 2023 timetable change, the following services stop at Le Marais:

- Regio: half-hourly service (hourly on weekends) between Morges and Bière.

== Bibliography ==
- Wägli, Hans G.; Jacobi, Sébastien (2010). Schienennetz Schweiz - Bahnprofil Schweiz CH+ [Swiss rail network] (in German) (3rd ed.). Zürich: AS Verlag. ISBN 978-3-909111-74-9.
