= Montricher railway station =

Railway station in Montricher, Switzerland

Montricher
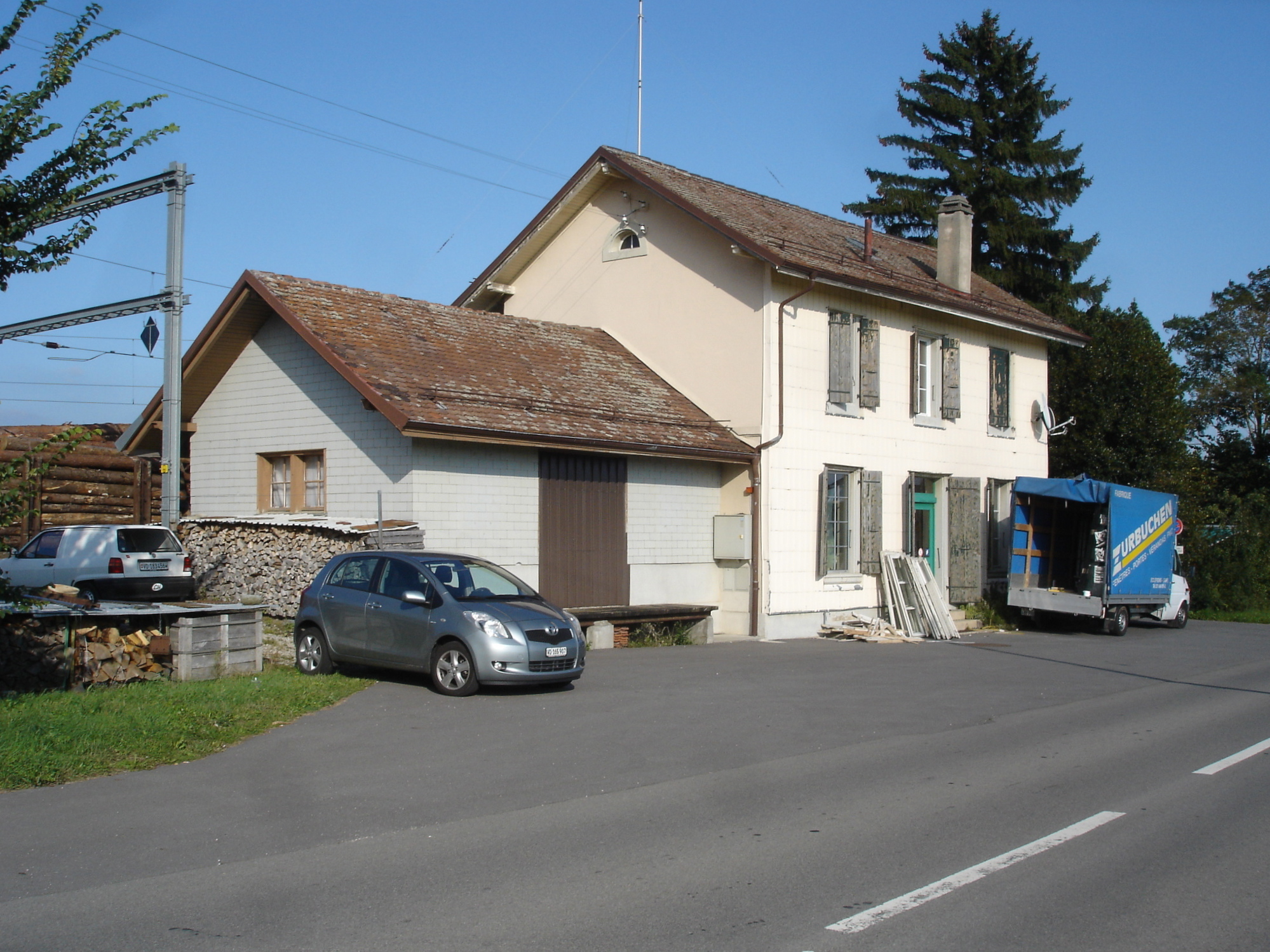
- The station in 2008

General information
- Location: Montricher, Vaud; Switzerland
- Coordinates: 46°35′46″N 6°23′35″E
- Elevation: 676 m (2,218 ft)
- Owner: Transports de la région Morges-Bière-Cossonay
- Line: Bière–Apples–Morges line
- Distance: 7.7 km (4.8 mi) from Apples
- Platforms: 1
- Tracks: 1
- Train operators: Transports de la région Morges-Bière-Cossonay
- Connections: MBC bus lines

Construction
- Accessible: No

Other information
- Station code: 8501098 (MORI)
- Fare zone: 38 (mobilis)

History
- Opened: 12 September 1896

Services
Preceding station	MBC	Following station
Tuilerie towards Apples	R57	Villars-Bozon towards L'Isle
Location

Montricher railway station (French: Gare de Montricher), is a railway station in the municipality of Montricher, in the Swiss canton of Vaud. It is an intermediate stop on the 1,000 mm (3 ft 3 3/8 in) metre gauge Bière–Apples–Morges line of Transports de la région Morges-Bière-Cossonay.

== Services ==
As of the December 2024 timetable change, the following services stop at Montricher:

- Regio: hourly service between Apples and L'Isle.

== Bibliography ==
- Wägli, Hans G.; Jacobi, Sébastien (2010). Schienennetz Schweiz - Bahnprofil Schweiz CH+ [Swiss rail network] (in German) (3rd ed.). Zürich: AS Verlag. ISBN 978-3-909111-74-9.
