= Reverolle railway station =

Railway station in Hautemorges, Switzerland

Reverolle
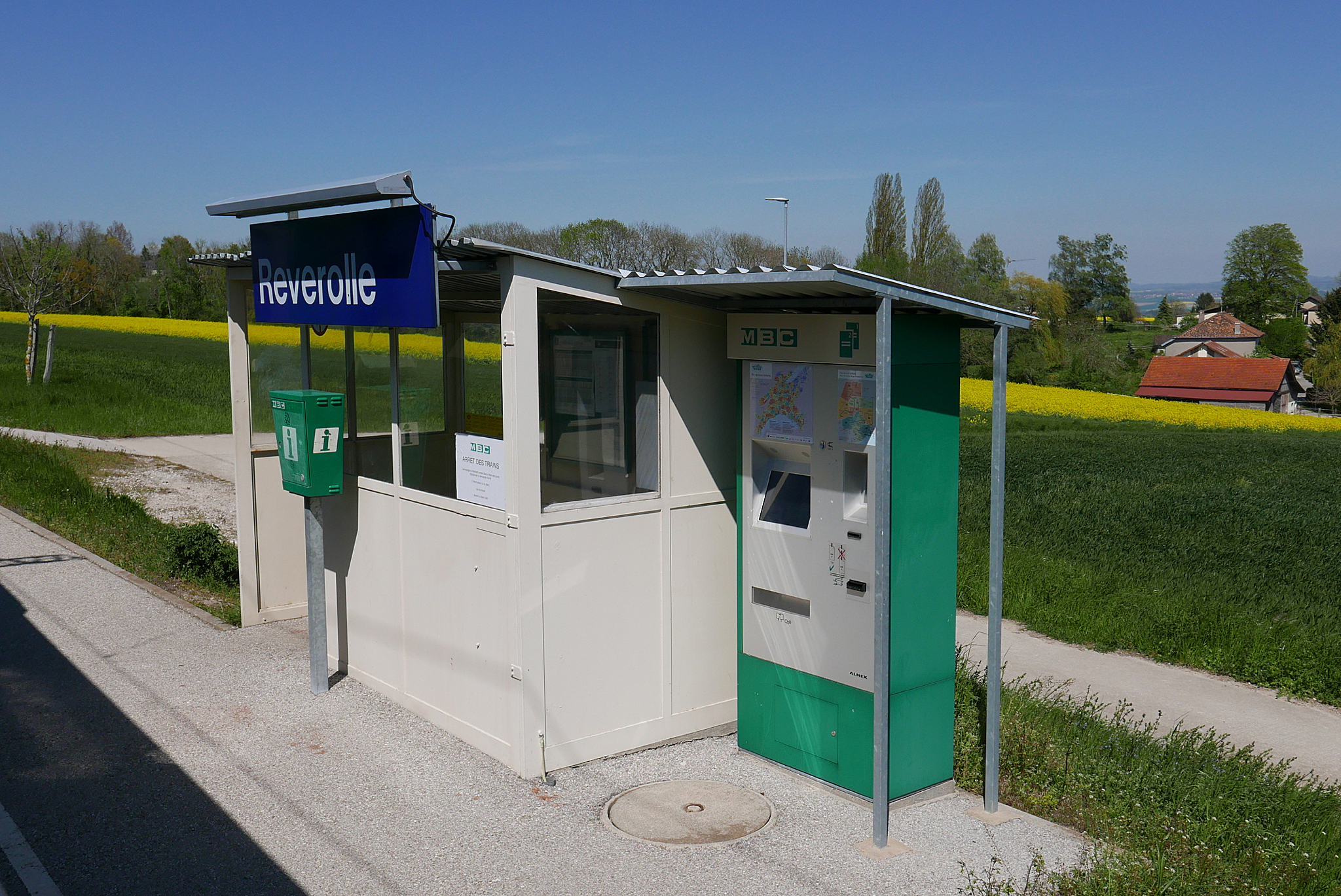
- The station shelter in 2016

General information
- Location: Hautemorges, Vaud; Switzerland
- Coordinates: 46°32′24″N 6°25′52″E
- Elevation: 602 m (1,975 ft)
- Owner: Transports de la région Morges-Bière-Cossonay
- Line: Bière–Apples–Morges line
- Distance: 10.2 km (6.3 mi) from Morges
- Platforms: 1 (1 side platform)
- Tracks: 1
- Train operators: Transports de la région Morges-Bière-Cossonay

Construction
- Accessible: Yes

Other information
- Station code: 8501083 (REV)
- Fare zone: 35 (mobilis)

History
- Opened: 1 July 1895

Services
| Preceding station | MBC | Following station |
|---|---|---|
| Apples towards Bière | R56 | Chardonney-Château towards Morges |
Location

Reverolle railway station (French: Gare de Reverolle), is a railway station in the municipality of Hautemorges, in the Swiss canton of Vaud. It is an intermediate stop and a request stop on the 1,000 mm (3 ft 3 3/8 in) metre gauge Bière–Apples–Morges line of Transports de la région Morges-Bière-Cossonay.

== Services ==
As of the December 2023 timetable change, the following services stop at Reverolle:

- Regio: half-hourly service (hourly on weekends) between Morges and Bière.

== Bibliography ==
- Wägli, Hans G.; Jacobi, Sébastien (2010). Schienennetz Schweiz - Bahnprofil Schweiz CH+ [Swiss rail network] (in German) (3rd ed.). Zürich: AS Verlag. ISBN 978-3-909111-74-9.
