= Chigny railway station =

Railway station in Chigny, Switzerland

Chigny
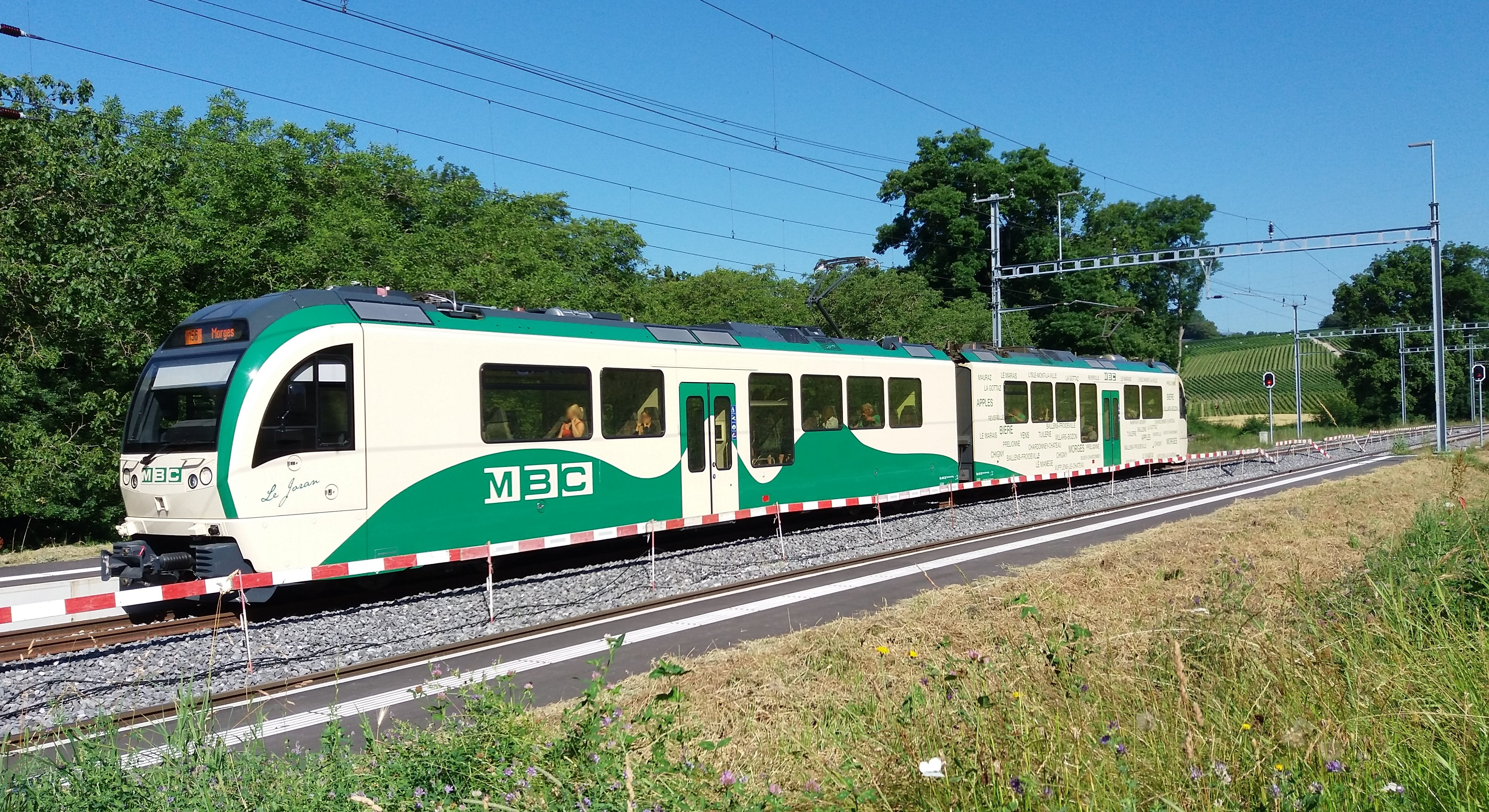
- A train at the station in 2016

General information
- Location: Chigny, Vaud; Switzerland
- Coordinates: 46°30′58″N 6°28′19″E
- Elevation: 431 m (1,414 ft)
- Owner: Transports de la région Morges-Bière-Cossonay
- Line: Bière–Apples–Morges line
- Distance: 2.5 km (1.6 mi) from Morges
- Platforms: 2 (2 side platforms)
- Tracks: 2
- Train operators: Transports de la région Morges-Bière-Cossonay

Construction
- Accessible: Yes

Other information
- Station code: 8501081 (CHGN)
- Fare zone: 31 (mobilis)

History
- Opened: 1 July 1895

Services
Preceding station	MBC	Following station
Vufflens-le-Château towards Bière	R56	Prélionne towards Morges
Location

Chigny railway station (French: Gare de Chigny), is a railway station in the municipality of Chigny, in the Swiss canton of Vaud. It is an intermediate stop and a request stop on the 1,000 mm (3 ft 3 3/8 in) metre gauge Bière–Apples–Morges line of Transports de la région Morges-Bière-Cossonay.

== Services ==
As of the December 2023 timetable change, the following services stop at Chigny:

- Regio: half-hourly service (hourly on weekends) between Morges and Bière.

== Bibliography ==
- Wägli, Hans G.; Jacobi, Sébastien (2010). Schienennetz Schweiz - Bahnprofil Schweiz CH+ [Swiss rail network] (in German) (3rd ed.). Zürich: AS Verlag. ISBN 978-3-909111-74-9.
