= Mauraz railway station =

Railway station in Hautemorges, Switzerland

Mauraz
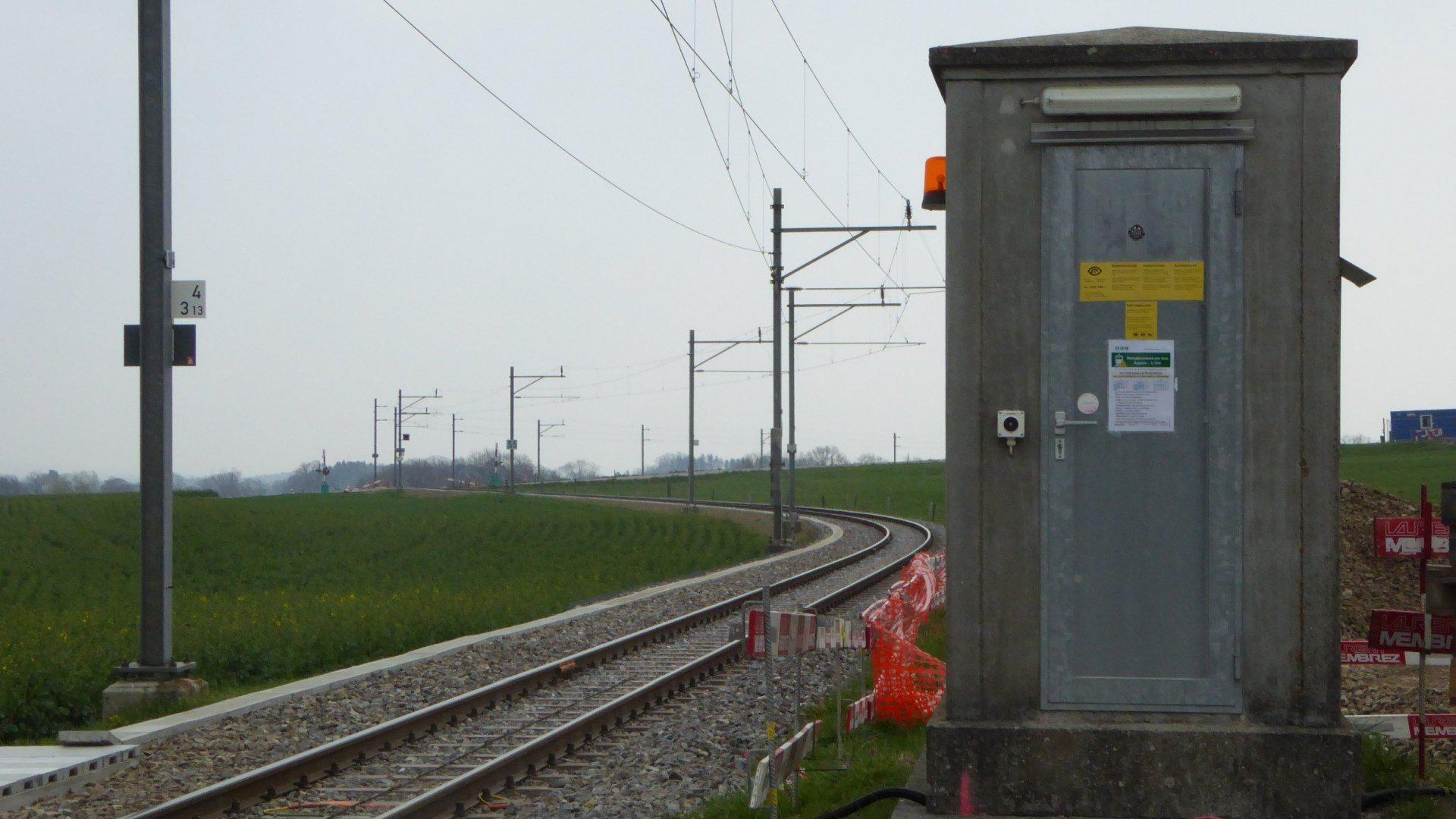
- Mauraz railway station in 2019

General information
- Location: Hautemorges, Vaud; Switzerland
- Coordinates: 46°35′06″N 6°25′48″E
- Elevation: 652 m (2,139 ft)
- Owner: Transports de la région Morges-Bière-Cossonay
- Line: Bière–Apples–Morges line
- Distance: 4.4 km (2.7 mi) from Apples
- Platforms: 1
- Tracks: 1
- Train operators: Transports de la région Morges-Bière-Cossonay

Construction
- Accessible: No

Other information
- Station code: 8501087 (MAUZ)
- Fare zone: 37 (mobilis)

History
- Opened: 12 September 1896

Services
Preceding station	MBC	Following station
Pampigny-Sévery towards Apples	R57	Tuilerie towards L'Isle
Location

Mauraz railway station (French: Gare de Mauraz), is a railway station in the municipality of Hautemorges, in the Swiss canton of Vaud. It is an intermediate stop and a request stop on the 1,000 mm (3 ft 3 3/8 in) metre gauge Bière–Apples–Morges line of Transports de la région Morges-Bière-Cossonay.

== Services ==
As of the December 2023 timetable change, the following services stop at Mauraz:

- Regio: hourly service between Apples and L'Isle.

== Bibliography ==
- Wägli, Hans G.; Jacobi, Sébastien (2010). Schienennetz Schweiz - Bahnprofil Schweiz CH+ [Swiss rail network] (in German) (3rd ed.). Zürich: AS Verlag. ISBN 978-3-909111-74-9.
