= Bussy-Chardonney railway station =

Railway station in Hautemorges, Switzerland

Bussy-Chardonney
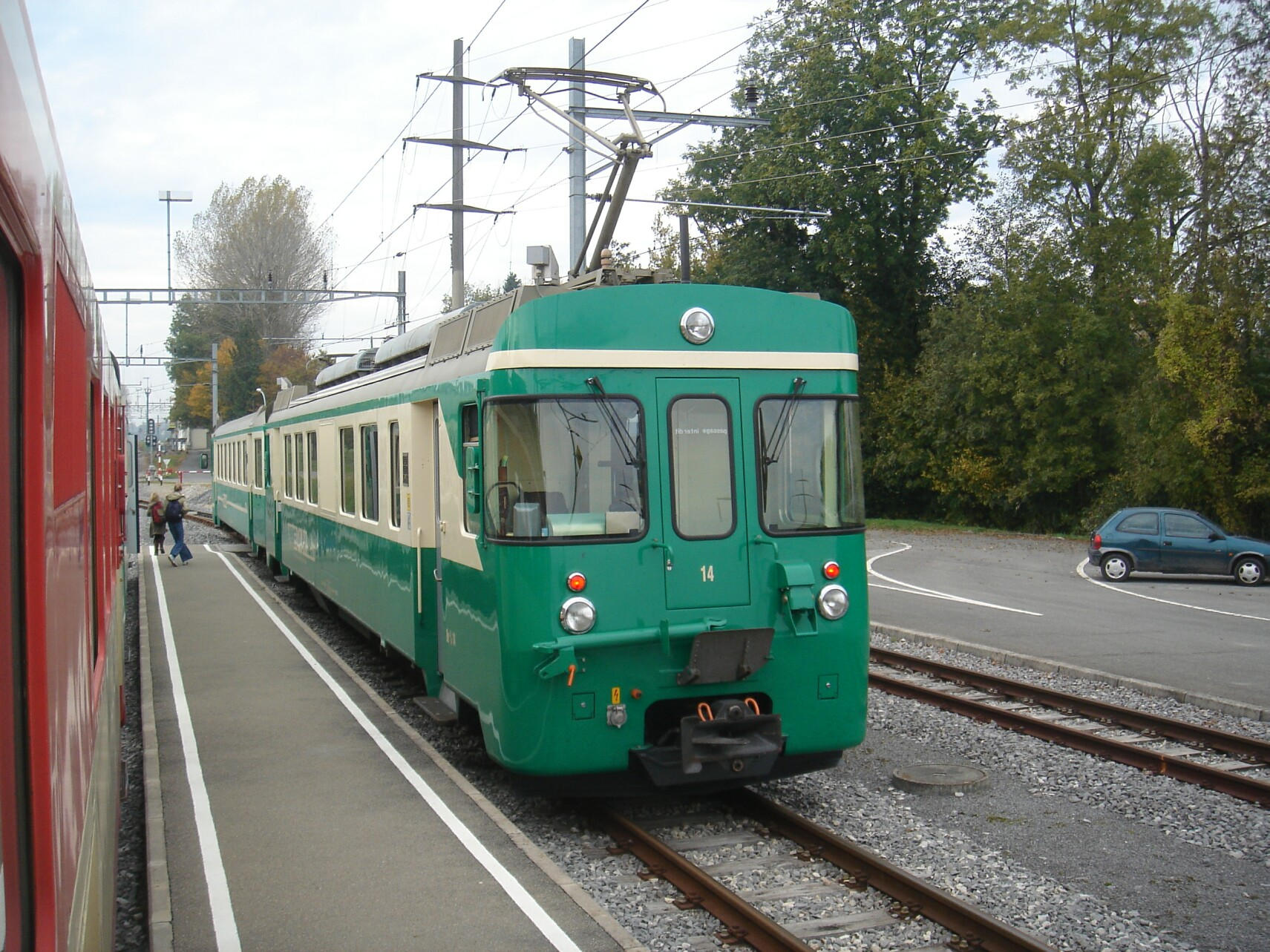
- A train at the station in 2006

General information
- Location: Hautemorges, Vaud; Switzerland
- Coordinates: 46°31′37″N 6°26′49″E
- Elevation: 506 m (1,660 ft)
- Owner: Transports de la région Morges-Bière-Cossonay
- Line: Bière–Apples–Morges line
- Distance: 5.8 km (3.6 mi) from Morges
- Platforms: 2 (2 side platforms)
- Tracks: 3
- Train operators: Transports de la région Morges-Bière-Cossonay

Construction
- Accessible: Yes

Other information
- Station code: 8501092 (BUSM)
- Fare zone: 34 (mobilis)

History
- Opened: 1 July 1895
- Former names: Bussy-sur-Morges (until 2009)

Services
Preceding station	MBC	Following station
Yens towards Bière	R56	Le Marais towards Morges
Location

Bussy-Chardonney railway station (French: Gare de Bussy-Chardonney), is a railway station in the municipality of Hautemorges, in the Swiss canton of Vaud. It is an intermediate stop on the 1,000 mm (3 ft 3 3/8 in) metre gauge Bière–Apples–Morges line of Transports de la région Morges-Bière-Cossonay.

== Services ==
As of the December 2023 timetable change, the following services stop at Bussy-Chardonney:

- Regio: half-hourly service (hourly on weekends) between Morges and Bière.

== Bibliography ==
- Wägli, Hans G.; Jacobi, Sébastien (2010). Schienennetz Schweiz - Bahnprofil Schweiz CH+ [Swiss rail network] (in German) (3rd ed.). Zürich: AS Verlag. ISBN 978-3-909111-74-9.
