= Tuilerie railway station =

Railway station in Hautemorges, Switzerland

Tuilerie

General information
- Location: Hautemorges, Vaud; Switzerland
- Coordinates: 46°35′35″N 6°24′50″E
- Elevation: 670 m (2,200 ft)
- Owner: Transports de la région Morges-Bière-Cossonay
- Line: Bière–Apples–Morges line
- Distance: 5.8 km (3.6 mi) from Apples
- Platforms: 1
- Tracks: 1
- Train operators: Transports de la région Morges-Bière-Cossonay

Construction
- Accessible: No

Other information
- Station code: 8501088 (TUIE)
- Fare zone: 37 (mobilis)

History
- Opened: 12 September 1896

Services
| Preceding station | MBC | Following station |
|---|---|---|
| Mauraz towards Apples | R57 | Montricher towards L'Isle |
Location

Tuilerie railway station (French: Gare de Tuilerie), is a railway station in the municipality of Hautemorges, in the Swiss canton of Vaud. It is an intermediate stop and a request stop on the 1,000 mm (3 ft 3 3/8 in) metre gauge Bière–Apples–Morges line of Transports de la région Morges-Bière-Cossonay.

== Services ==
As of the December 2023 timetable change, the following services stop at Tuilerie:

- Regio: hourly service between Apples and L'Isle.

== Bibliography ==
- Wägli, Hans G.; Jacobi, Sébastien (2010). Schienennetz Schweiz - Bahnprofil Schweiz CH+ [Swiss rail network] (in German) (3rd ed.). Zürich: AS Verlag. ISBN 978-3-909111-74-9.
