= Villars-Bozon railway station =

Railway station in L'Isle, Switzerland

Villars-Bozon
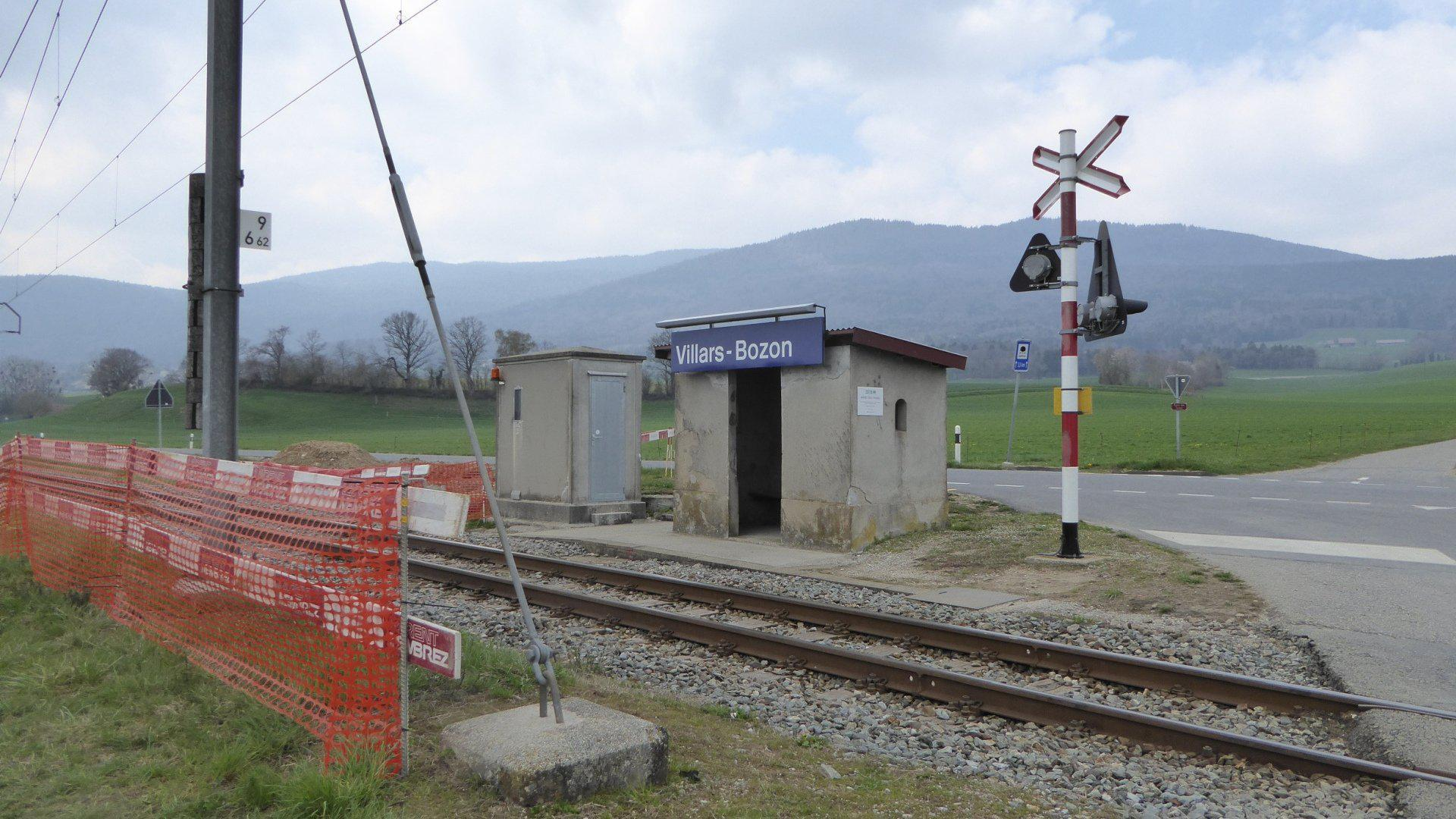
- Villars-Bozon railway station in 2019

General information
- Location: L'Isle, Vaud; Switzerland
- Coordinates: 46°36′36″N 6°24′07″E
- Elevation: 662 m (2,172 ft)
- Owner: Transports de la région Morges-Bière-Cossonay
- Line: Bière–Apples–Morges line
- Distance: 9.7 km (6.0 mi) from Apples
- Platforms: 1
- Tracks: 1
- Train operators: Transports de la région Morges-Bière-Cossonay

Construction
- Accessible: No

Other information
- Station code: 8501089 (VIAB)
- Fare zone: 38 (mobilis)

History
- Opened: 12 September 1896

Services
Preceding station	MBC	Following station
Montricher towards Apples	R57	L'Isle Terminus
Location

Villars-Bozon railway station (French: Gare de Villars-Bozon) is a railway station in the municipality of L'Isle, in the Swiss canton of Vaud. It is an intermediate stop and a request stop on the 1,000 mm (3 ft 3 3/8 in) metre gauge Bière–Apples–Morges line of Transports de la région Morges-Bière-Cossonay.

== Services ==
As of the December 2023 timetable change, the following services stop at Villars-Bozon:

- Regio: hourly service between Apples and L'Isle.

== Bibliography ==
- Wägli, Hans G.; Jacobi, Sébastien (2010). Schienennetz Schweiz - Bahnprofil Schweiz CH+ [Swiss rail network] (in German) (3rd ed.). Zürich: AS Verlag. ISBN 978-3-909111-74-9.
