= Ballens railway station =

Railway station in Ballens, Switzerland

Ballens
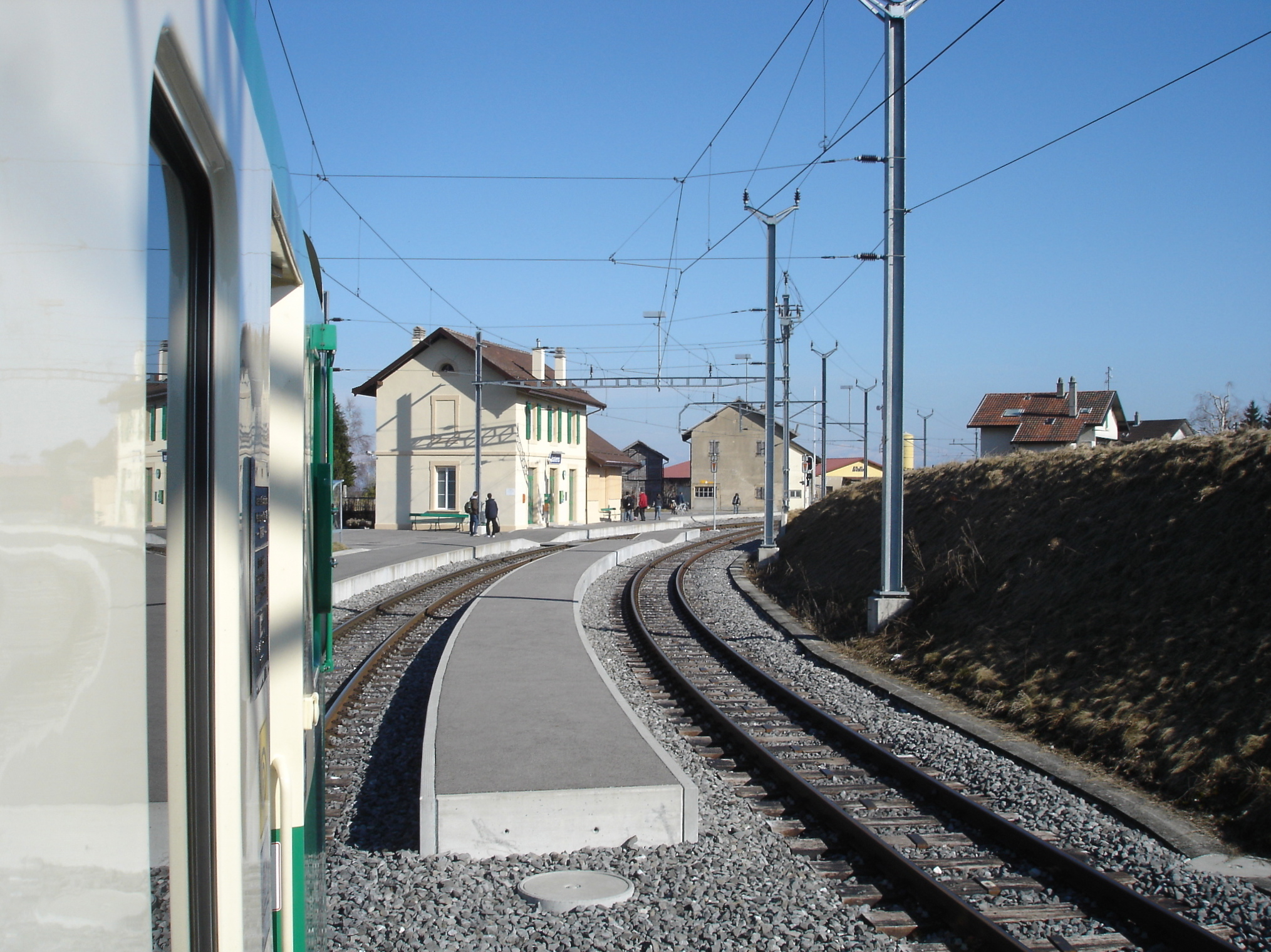
- The station in 2009

General information
- Location: Ballens, Vaud; Switzerland
- Coordinates: 46°33′07″N 6°22′26″E
- Elevation: 713 m (2,339 ft)
- Owner: Transports de la région Morges-Bière-Cossonay
- Line: Bière–Apples–Morges line
- Distance: 15.6 km (9.7 mi) from Morges
- Platforms: 2
- Tracks: 2
- Train operators: Transports de la région Morges-Bière-Cossonay

Construction
- Accessible: No

Other information
- Station code: 8501095 (BALL)
- Fare zone: 36 (mobilis)

History
- Opened: 1 July 1895

Services
Preceding station	MBC	Following station
Bière Terminus	R56	Ballens-Froideville towards Morges
Location

Ballens railway station (French: Gare de Ballens), is a railway station in the municipality of Ballens, in the Swiss canton of Vaud. It is an intermediate stop and a request stop on the 1,000 mm (3 ft 3 3/8 in) metre gauge Bière–Apples–Morges line of Transports de la région Morges-Bière-Cossonay.

== Services ==
As of the December 2023 timetable change, the following services stop at Ballens:

- Regio: half-hourly service (hourly on weekends) between Morges and Bière.

== Bibliography ==
- Wägli, Hans G.; Jacobi, Sébastien (2010). Schienennetz Schweiz - Bahnprofil Schweiz CH+ [Swiss rail network] (in German) (3rd ed.). Zürich: AS Verlag. ISBN 978-3-909111-74-9.
