= Ateliers de Constructions Mécaniques de Vevey =

Ateliers de constructions mécaniques de Vevey (ACMV)
- Industry: Engineering
- Predecessor: Ateliers B. Roy & Cie. (1848)
- Founded: 1895
- Fate: Vevey, closed 1992; Villeneuve, acquired by DWA 1997
- Headquarters: Vevey, Switzerland
- Products: Bridges, large machines and structures, rail vehicles

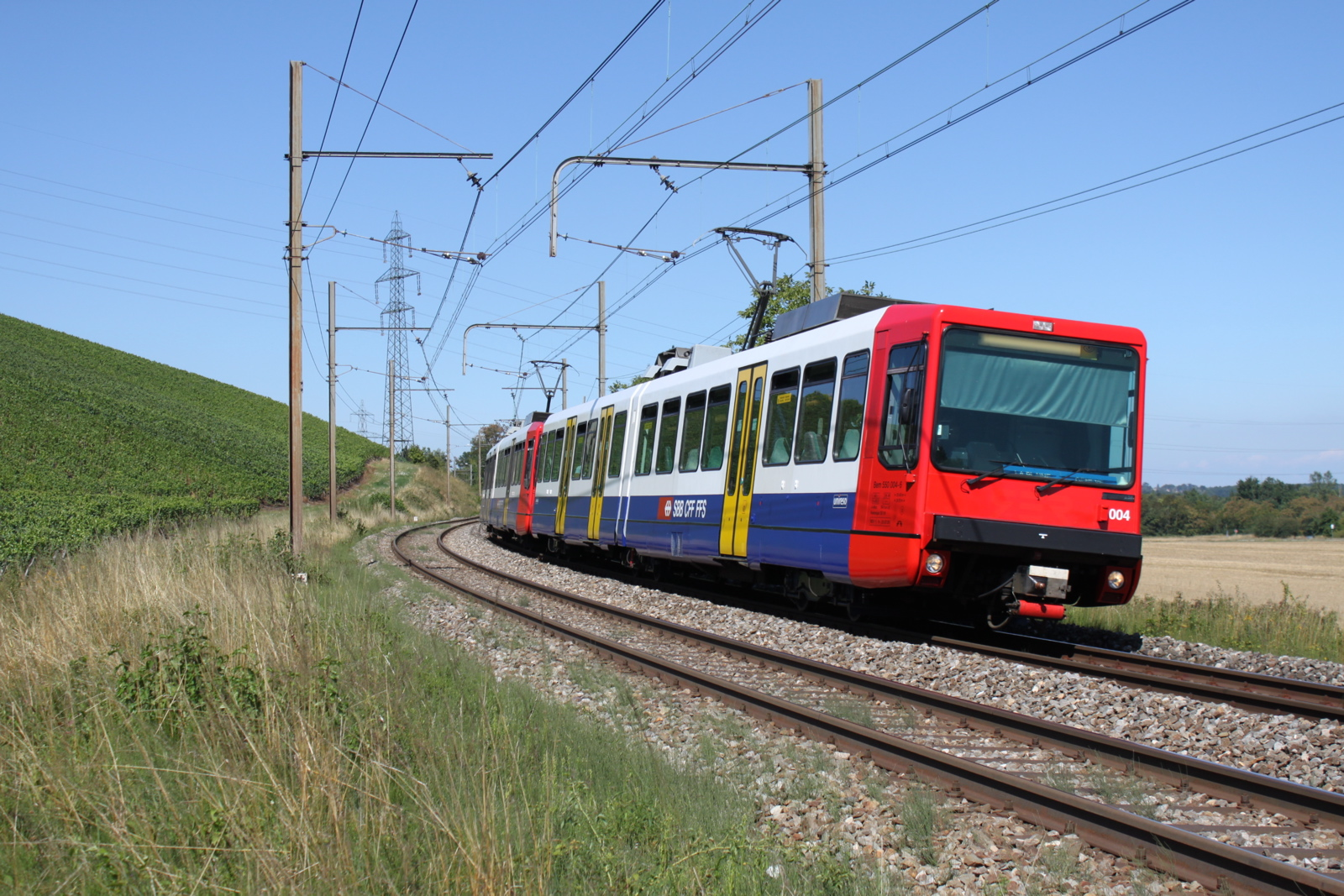
SBB-CFF-FFS Bem 550 manufactured by ACMV / Duewag / ABB

Ateliers de constructions mécaniques de Vevey (ACMV) was a metal engineering company based in Vevey, Switzerland. Founded as Ateliers B. Roy & Cie. in 1848 by Benjamin Roy it became Ateliers de constructions mécaniques de Vevey SA in 1895.

The company manufactured large metal structures, freight wagons, and later trams. The plant in Vevey closed in 1992.

As of 2011 the company's Villeneuve factory is part of Bombardier Transportation (Switzerland), and manufactures long distance, regional and mass transit passenger trains, and trams.

== History ==
The company Ateliers B.Roy & Cie was founded in 1848 by Benjamin Roy. The company repaired agricultural equipment and repaired mill wheels. Later large scale metal manufacturing was carried out, including tunnel boring machines, hydroelectric equipment, bridges and liquified gas tanks. The plant in Vevey was modernised in 1962, but closed in 1992.

A factory in Villeneuve, opened in 1948 for construction of rail vehicles, primarily wagons. In 1954 the company's first trams were constructed for the cities of Lausanne and Lugano, in 1967 the company's first carriages for the Chemin de fer Aigle-Ollon-Monthey-Champéry, in 1977 the company's first electric trains were made for the Chemin de fer Bière-Apples-Morges (BAM) and in 1982 the factory's first low-floor trams.

In 1997 the plant was sold to the German company Deutsche Waggonbau AG (DWA), which was acquired by Bombardier Inc. in 1998. The Villeneuve factory became Bombardier's production site for Switzerland in 2004, and in 2008 a third assembly hall was added.
