= Funiculaire de Cossonay =

Funicular railway in canton of Vaud, Switzerland

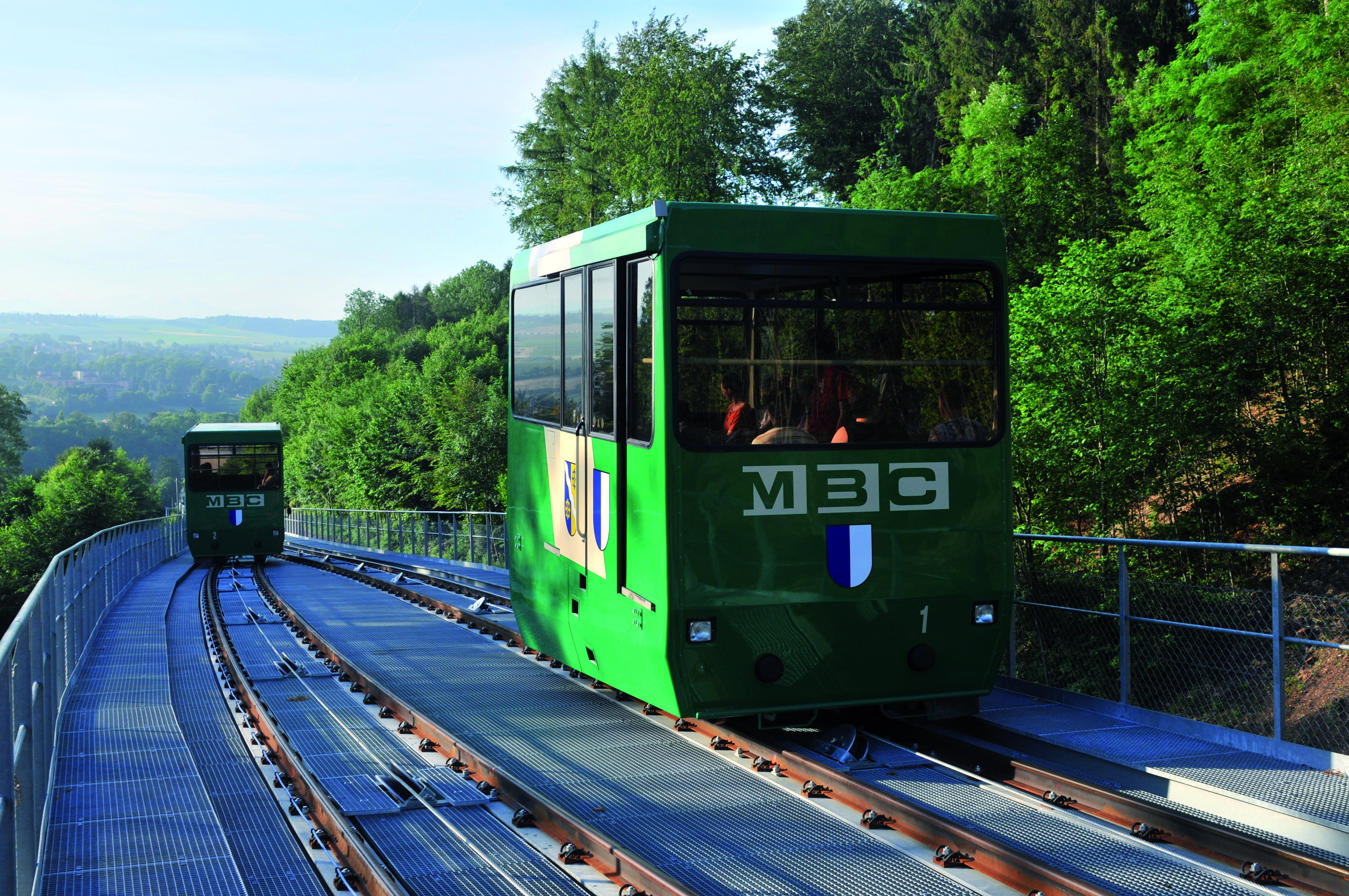
- passing loop with the two cars (2014)

Overview
- Other names: Funiculaire Cossonay-Ville–Cossonay-Gare; Funiculaire de la Gare à la Ville de Cossonay
- Status: In operation
- Owner: Transports de la région Morges-Bière-Cossonay (since 2010); Compagnie du Chemin de fer funiculaire de la Gare à la Ville de Cossonay (1892-2003, name change), Funiculaire de la Gare à la Ville de Cossonay SA (2003-2010)
- Locale: Vaud, Switzerland
- Coordinates: 46.608914°N 6.51648°E
- Termini: Cossonay-Gare; Cossonay-Ville at Avenue du Funiculaire
- Connecting lines: Jura Foot line; Simplon line
- Stations: 2
- Website: mbc.ch

Service
- Type: Funicular
- Operator(s): Transports de la région Morges-Bière-Cossonay (short: MBC)
- Rolling stock: 2 for 47 passengers each

History
- Opened: 28 August 1897; 128 years ago

Technical
- Line length: 1,228 metres (4,029 ft)
- Number of tracks: 1 with passing loop
- Track gauge: 1,000 mm (3 ft 3 3/8 in) metre gauge
- Electrification: 1982 (water counterbalancing before)
- Conduction system: automated in 1969
- Operating speed: 4.5 metres per second (15 ft/s)
- Highest elevation: 563 m (1,847 ft)
- Maximum incline: 13%

The Funiculaire de Cossonay is a funicular railway connecting the town of Cossonay in the Swiss canton of Vaud with Cossonay-Penthalaz railway station, on the line from Lausanne to Vallorbe and Yverdon-les-Bains. The lower funicular station is called Cossonay-Gare, but is in the village of Penthalaz. The upper station, some 130 metres (430 ft) above, is named Cossonay-Ville. The line has a length of 1,228 m (4,029 ft) at a maximum incline of 13%.

== History ==
The line was opened in 1897, and was initially operated as a water counterbalance funicular. In 1969, the line was automated, still as a water counterbalance funicular. In 1982, the line was rebuilt and converted to electric operation, with new cabins and stations.

The funicular was again completely overhauled between 2012 and 2014, reopening on June 10. At the same time, the 1982-built cabins were refurbished and repainted in its owner's green and cream. During the overhaul period, a replacement bus operated the connection.

== Operation ==
The Compagnie du Chemin de fer Funiculaire de la Gare à la Ville de Cossonay, after a name change in 2003 Funiculaire de la Gare à la Ville de Cossonay SA, was founded in 1892. In 2010 the company was merged into the Transports de la région Morges-Bière-Cossonay, which had assumed operation already before, but then on behalf of the original owner company. The funicular is completely automatic and has the following parameters:

Feature	Value
Number of cars	2
Number of stops	2
Configuration	Single track with passing loop
Mode of operation	Automated
Track length	1,228 metres (4,029 ft)
Rise	135 metres (443 ft)
Average gradient	11.5%
Maximum gradient	13%
Track gauge	1,000 mm (3 ft 3 3/8 in) metre gauge
Capacity	47 passengers per car
Maximum speed	4.5 metres per second (15 ft/s)
Travel time	6 minutes

== See also ==
- List of funicular railways
- List of funiculars in Switzerland

== Gallery ==
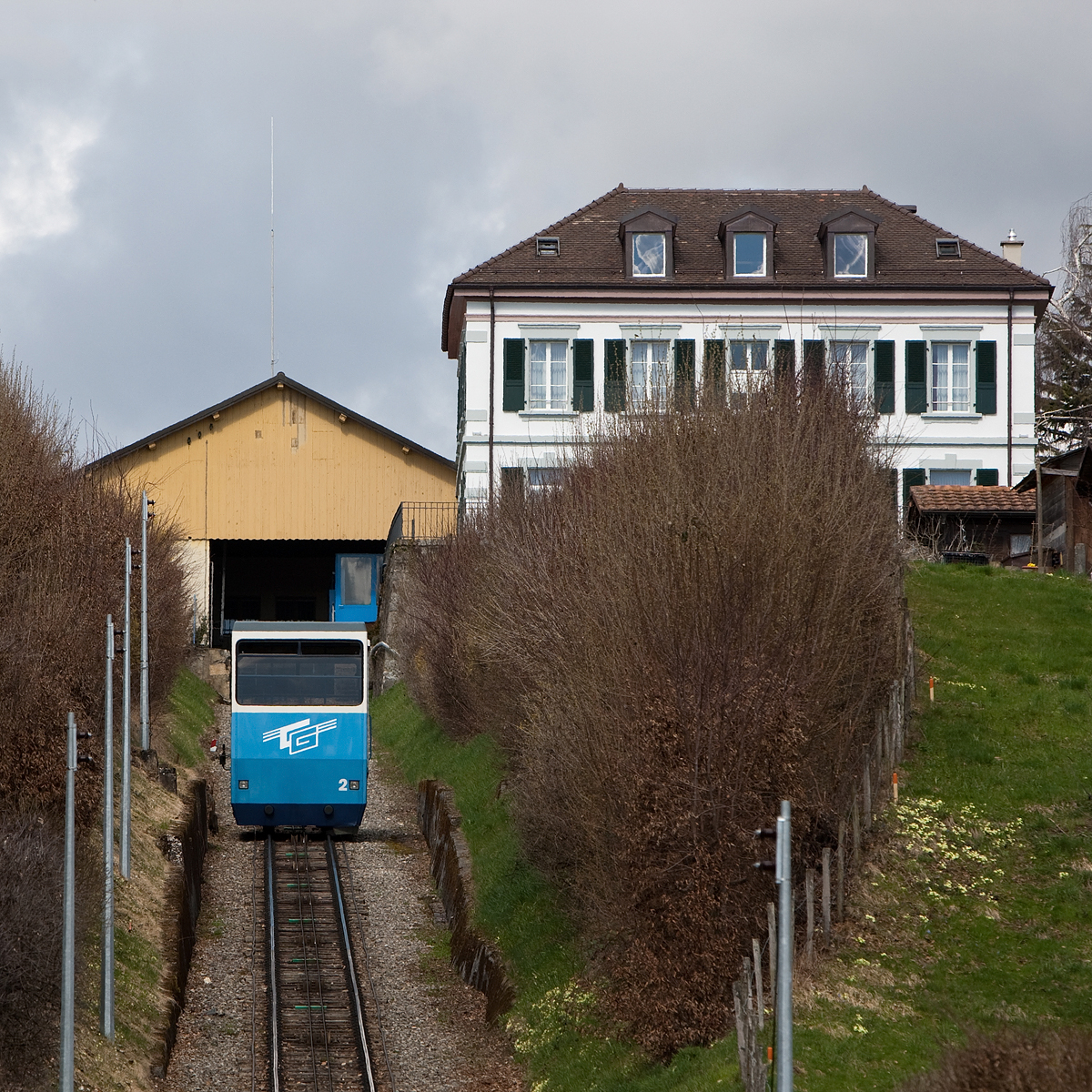
upper station with car in blue (2010)

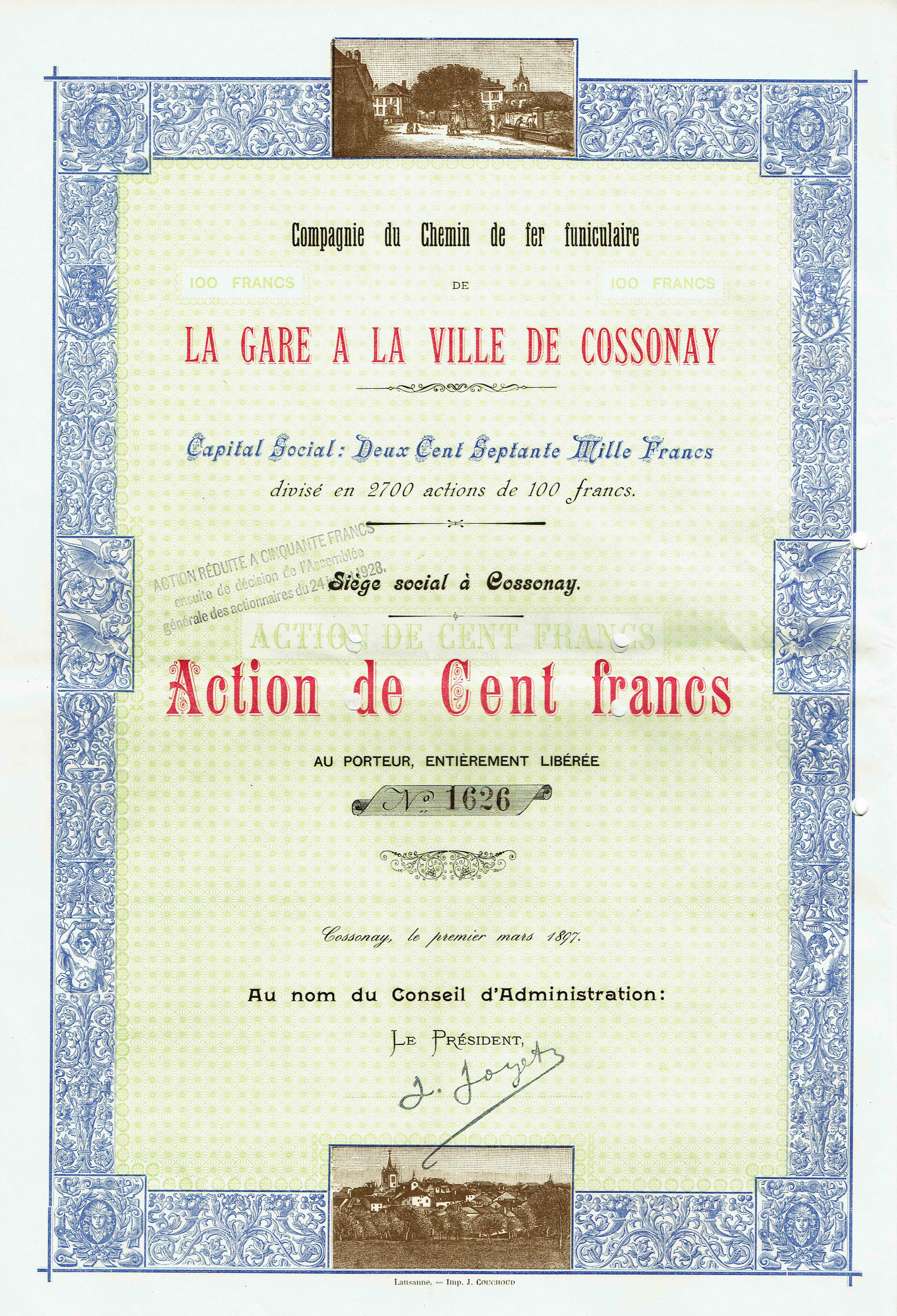
Share of Compagnie du Chemin de fer funiculaire de la Gare à la Ville de Cossonay, issued 1. March 1897
