= Apples railway station =

Railway station in Hautemorges, Switzerland

Apples
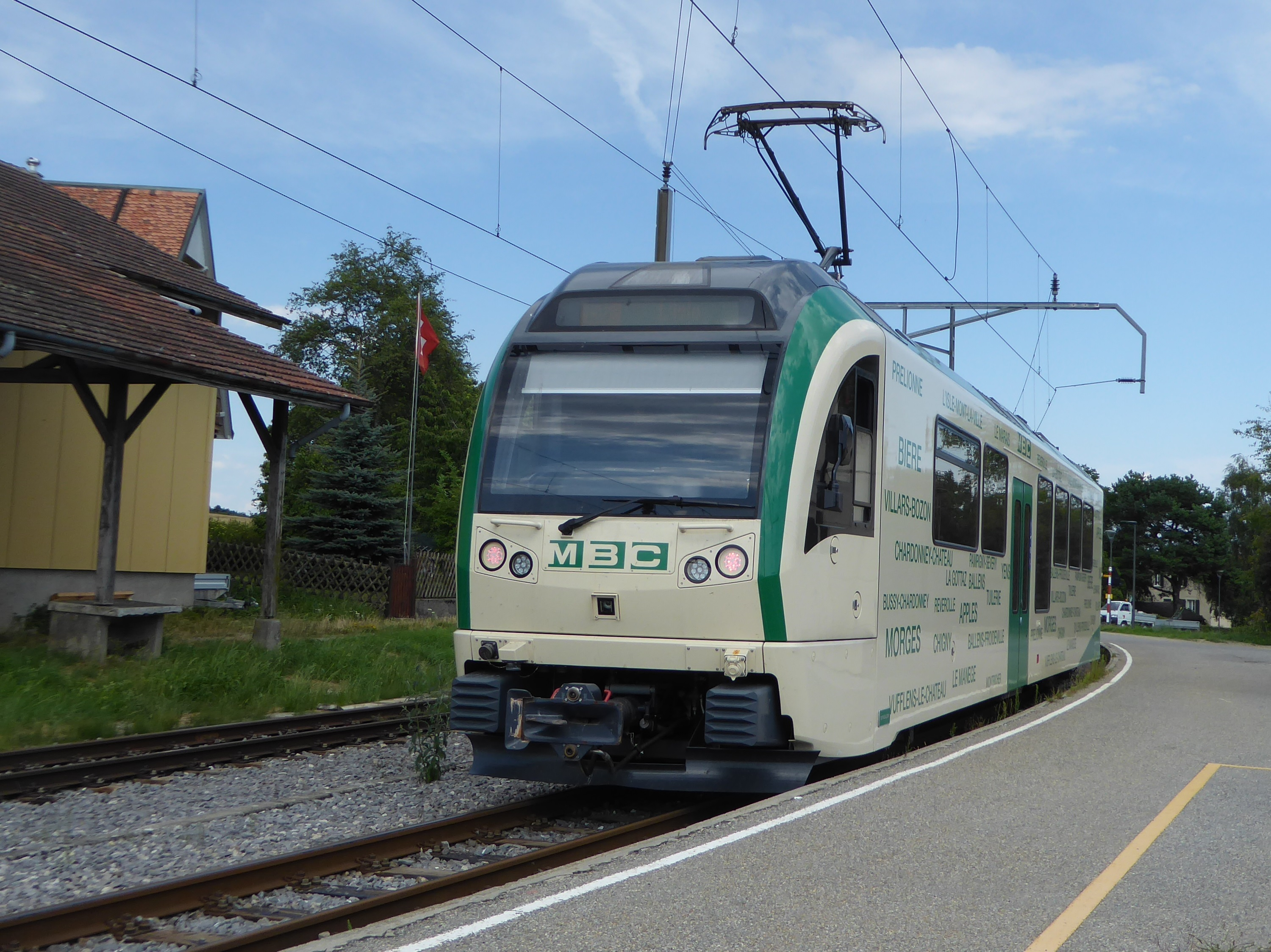
- A train at the station in 2018

General information
- Location: Hautemorges, Vaud; Switzerland
- Coordinates: 46°33′03″N 6°25′25″E
- Elevation: 642 m (2,106 ft)
- Owner: Transports de la région Morges-Bière-Cossonay
- Line: Bière–Apples–Morges line
- Distance: 11.6 km (7.2 mi) from Morges
- Platforms: 3
- Tracks: 6
- Train operators: Transports de la région Morges-Bière-Cossonay
- Connections: MBC bus line

Construction
- Accessible: No

Other information
- Station code: 8501094 (APPL)
- Fare zone: 35 (mobilis)

History
- Opened: 1 July 1895

Services
Preceding station	MBC	Following station
Ballens-Froideville towards Bière	R56	Reverolle towards Morges
Terminus	R57	Le Manège towards L'Isle
Location

Apples railway station (French: Gare d'Apples), is a railway station in the municipality of Hautemorges, in the Swiss canton of Vaud. The station is a keilbahnhof. It is located on the 1,000 mm (3 ft 3 3/8 in) metre gauge Bière–Apples–Morges line of Transports de la région Morges-Bière-Cossonay, at the point where the line splits, with branches going to Bière and L'Isle.

== Services ==
As of the December 2023 timetable change, the following services stop at Apples:

- Regio:
  - half-hourly service (hourly on weekends) between Morges and Bière.
  - hourly service to L'Isle.

== Bibliography ==
- Wägli, Hans G.; Jacobi, Sébastien (2010). Schienennetz Schweiz - Bahnprofil Schweiz CH+ [Swiss rail network] (in German) (3rd ed.). Zürich: AS Verlag. ISBN 978-3-909111-74-9.
- Hadorn, Gérald; Rochaix, Jean-Louis (1986). Narrow-gauge Railways of the Vaud Countryside. Lausanne: BVA. ISBN 2-88125-004-1..
- Dehanne, Michel; Grandguillaume, Michel; Hadorn, Gérald; Jarne, Sébastien; Rochaix, Anette; Rochaix, Jean-Louis (2000). Vaud Private Railways 1873–2000. Belmont: La Raillère (formerly BVA). ISBN 978-2-88125-011-8..
- Rochaix, Jean-Louis; Jarne, Sébastien; Hadorn, Gérald; Grandguillaume, Michel; Dehanne, Michel; Rochaix, Anette (2009). Vaud Private Railways 2000–2009: 10 Years of Modernization. Belmont: La Raillère. p. 420. ISBN 978-2-88125-012-5..
