= L'Isle railway station =

Railway station in L'Isle, Switzerland

L'Isle
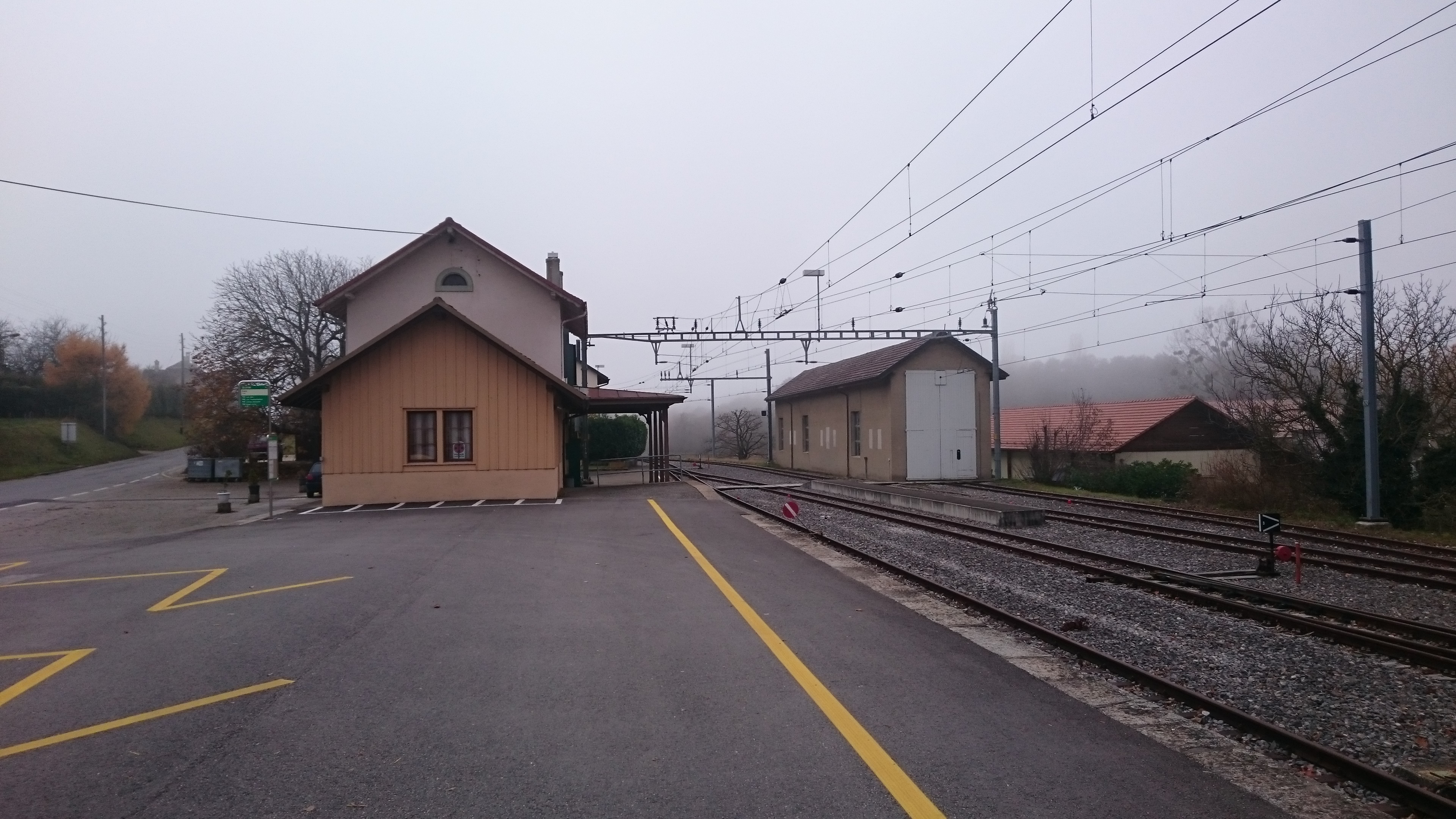
- The station in 2016

General information
- Location: L'Isle, Vaud; Switzerland
- Coordinates: 46°37′02″N 6°24′40″E
- Elevation: 666 m (2,185 ft)
- Owner: Transports de la région Morges-Bière-Cossonay
- Line: Bière–Apples–Morges line
- Distance: 10.7 km (6.6 mi) from Apples
- Platforms: 1 side platform
- Tracks: 4
- Train operators: Transports de la région Morges-Bière-Cossonay
- Connections: MBC buses

Construction
- Accessible: No

Other information
- Station code: 8501099 (ISLE)
- Fare zone: 38 (mobilis)

History
- Opened: 12 September 1896
- Former names: L'Isle-Mont-la-Ville (until 2015)

Services
Preceding station	MBC	Following station
Villars-Bozon towards Apples	R57	Terminus
Location

L'Isle railway station (French: Gare de l'Isle), is a railway station in the municipality of L'Isle, in the Swiss canton of Vaud. It is the northern terminus of the Apples–L'Isle branch line of the 1,000 mm (3 ft 3 3/8 in) metre gauge Bière–Apples–Morges line of Transports de la région Morges-Bière-Cossonay.

== Services ==
As of the December 2023 timetable change, the following services stop at L'Isle:

- Regio: hourly service to Apples.

== Bibliography ==
- Wägli, Hans G.; Jacobi, Sébastien (2010). Schienennetz Schweiz - Bahnprofil Schweiz CH+ [Swiss rail network] (in German) (3rd ed.). Zürich: AS Verlag. ISBN 978-3-909111-74-9.
