= Morges railway station =

Railway station in Morges, Switzerland

Morges
- View of the Morges station from platform two in August 2026.

General information
- Location: Morges; Switzerland
- Coordinates: 46°30′40″N 6°29′38″E
- Elevation: 381 m (1,250 ft)
- Owner: Swiss Federal Railways
- Lines: Bière–Apples–Morges line; Lausanne–Geneva line
- Distance: 12.5 km (7.8 mi) from Lausanne
- Platforms: 5: 2 island platforms; 1 side platform
- Tracks: 5
- Train operators: Swiss Federal Railways; Transports de la région Morges-Bière-Cossonay
- Connections: MBC

Construction
- Parking: Yes (282 spaces)
- Cycle facilities: Yes (254 spaces)
- Accessible: Yes

Other information
- Station code: 8501037 (MOR)
- Fare zone: 30 (mobilis)

Passengers
- 2025: 17,500 per day (SBB (excluding MBC))
- Rank: 47 out of 1,095

Services
Preceding station	SBB CFF FFS	Following station
Gland towards Geneva Airport	IR 57	Yverdon-les-Bains towards Neuchâtel
Nyon towards Geneva Airport	IR 15	Lausanne towards Lucerne
Nyon towards Geneva Airport	IR 95	Lausanne towards Brig
Allaman towards Annemasse or Geneva Airport	RE33	Renens VD towards St-Maurice or Martigny
Preceding station	RER Vaud	Following station
St-Prex towards Allaman	R8	Lonay-Préverenges towards Payerne
St-Prex towards Allaman	R9	Morges-St-Jean towards Murten/Morat
Preceding station	MBC	Following station
La Gottaz towards Bière	R56	Terminus
Location

Morges railway station (French: Gare de Morges) is a railway station in the municipality of Morges, in the Swiss canton of Vaud. It is an intermediate stop on the standard gauge Lausanne–Geneva line of Swiss Federal Railways and the eastern terminus of the 1,000 mm (3 ft 3 3/8 in) gauge Bière–Apples–Morges line of Transports de la région Morges-Bière-Cossonay (MBC).

== Layout and connections ==
Morges has two island platforms and a side platform serving five passenger tracks. The 1,000 mm (3 ft 3 3/8 in) gauge trains of the Transports de la région Morges-Bière-Cossonay (MBC) use track No. 5, on the north side of the station; the standard gauge trains of Swiss Federal Railways use the other four tracks. MBC also operates bus services from the station.

== Services ==
As of the December 2024 timetable change, the following services stop at Morges:

- InterRegio:
  - half-hourly service to Geneva Airport and hourly service to Brig or Lucerne.
  - limited service between Geneva Airport and Neuchâtel.
- RegioExpress: half-hourly service (hourly on weekends) between Annemasse and St-Maurice, and hourly service from St-Maurice to Martigny. On weekends, hourly service to Geneva Airport.
- Regio: half-hourly service (hourly on weekends) to Bière.
- RER Vaud R8 / R9: half-hourly service between Allaman and Payerne, with every other train continuing from Payerne to Murten/Morat.
