= Bière railway station =

Railway station in Bière, Switzerland

Bière
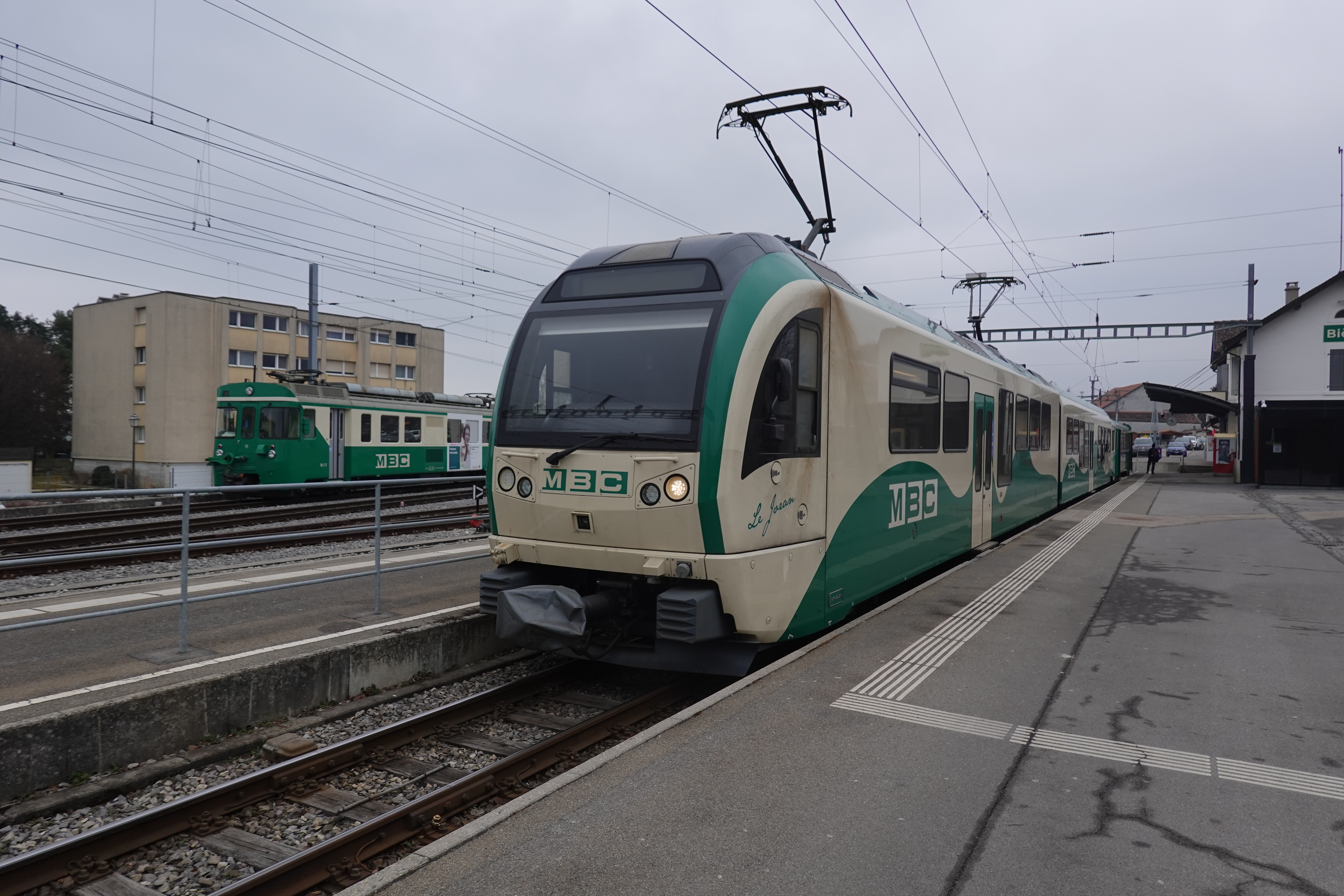
- A train at the station in 2023

General information
- Location: Bière, Vaud; Switzerland
- Coordinates: 46°32′17″N 6°19′59″E
- Elevation: 694 m (2,277 ft)
- Owner: Transports de la région Morges-Bière-Cossonay
- Line: Bière–Apples–Morges line
- Distance: 19.1 km (11.9 mi) from Morges
- Platforms: 2
- Tracks: 2
- Train operators: Transports de la région Morges-Bière-Cossonay
- Connections: MBC bus line

Construction
- Accessible: Yes

Other information
- Station code: 8501096 (BIER)
- Fare zone: 36 (mobilis)

History
- Opened: 1 July 1895

Services
Preceding station	MBC	Following station
Terminus	R56	Ballens towards Morges
Location

Bière railway station (French: Gare de Bière), is a railway station in the municipality of Bière, in the Swiss canton of Vaud. It is the western terminus on the 1,000 mm (3 ft 3 3/8 in) metre gauge Bière–Apples–Morges line of Transports de la région Morges-Bière-Cossonay.

== Services ==
As of the December 2023 timetable change, the following services stop at Bière:

- Regio: half-hourly service (hourly on weekends) to Morges.

== Bibliography ==
- Wägli, Hans G.; Jacobi, Sébastien (2010). Schienennetz Schweiz - Bahnprofil Schweiz CH+ [Swiss rail network] (in German) (3rd ed.). Zürich: AS Verlag. ISBN 978-3-909111-74-9.
- Hadorn, Gérald; Rochaix, Jean-Louis (1986). Narrow-gauge Railways of the Vaud Countryside. Lausanne: BVA. ISBN 2-88125-004-1..
- Dehanne, Michel; Grandguillaume, Michel; Hadorn, Gérald; Jarne, Sébastien; Rochaix, Anette; Rochaix, Jean-Louis (2000). Vaud Private Railways 1873–2000. Belmont: La Raillère (formerly BVA). ISBN 978-2-88125-011-8..
- Rochaix, Jean-Louis; Jarne, Sébastien; Hadorn, Gérald; Grandguillaume, Michel; Dehanne, Michel; Rochaix, Anette (2009). Vaud Private Railways 2000–2009: 10 Years of Modernization. Belmont: La Raillère. p. 420. ISBN 978-2-88125-012-5..
