= Bière–Apples–Morges railway =

Narrow gauge railway line in Switzerland

Bière-Apples-Morges
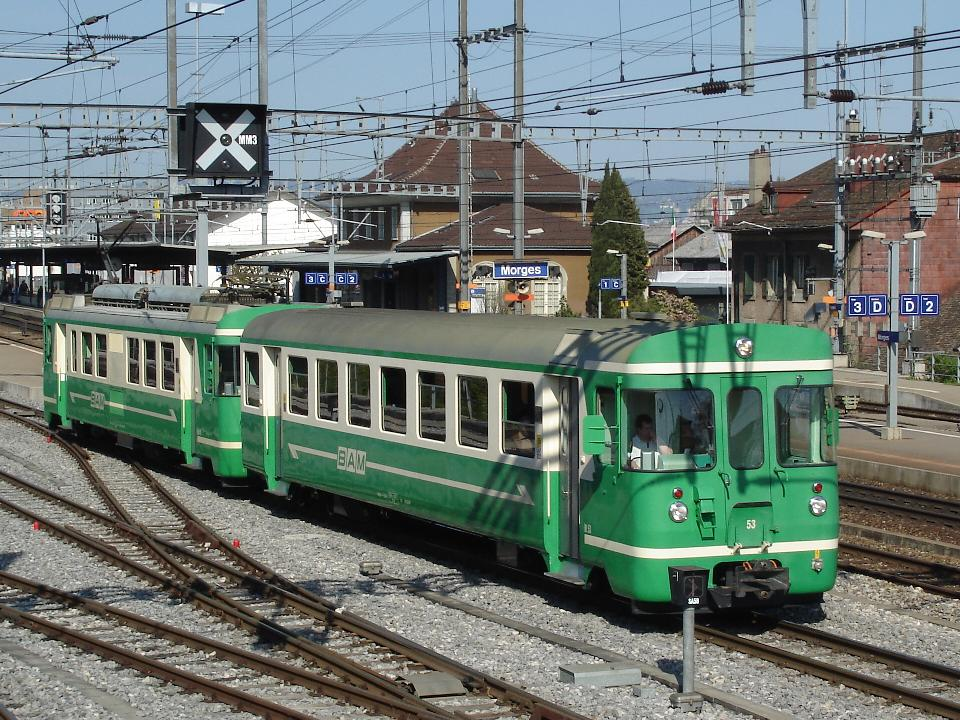
- BAM local train at Morges on 2007

Overview
- Owner: Transports de la région Morges-Bière-Cossonay
- Line number: 156
- Termini: L'Isle; Bière; Morges

Technical
- Line length: 30 km (19 mi)
- Number of tracks: 1
- Track gauge: 1,000 mm (3 ft 3 3/8 in) metre gauge
- Electrification: 15 kV/16.7 Hz AC overhead catenary
- Maximum incline: 3.57%

The Bière–Apples–Morges Railway (BAM) or Chemin de fer Bière-Apples-Morges, located in Switzerland, is a 1,000 mm (3 ft 3 3/8 in) metre gauge railway with a total length of almost 30 kilometres (19 mi) which links the towns in its name and from a junction at Apples to the village of L’Isle. The company was renamed to Transports de la région Morges-Bière-Cossonay (MBC) to express its other activities, mainly in local and regional bus services. Furthermore the Funiculaire Cossonay–Gare–Ville is part of MBC since 2010, Before, MBC was contracted to operate it.

== History ==
The communities in the area between Morges, on the shores of Lake Geneva, and Biere first got together to discuss a line connecting the lakeside, the towns in the area and the expanding army barracks at Biere, on 26 September 1875 when they also realised there would also be a traffic flow of forestry and agricultural produce. Five different routes were considered and in the end a compromise route was agreed in 1890 but it took a further four years before construction started. The line opened on 1 July 1895. The line from Apples to L'Isle was opened on 12 September 1896 but after three years it merged with the BAM. Originally the lines were steam worked and it was not until 1943 that the system was electrified, the main line from 10 May, the Apples to L’Isle line from 13 November.

== The lines ==
The main line of the system runs from Morges, where the trains use platforms within the Swiss Federal Railways (CFF/SBB/FFS) station on the Lausanne–Geneva railway, to the village of Bière, a distance of 19.1 kilometres (11.9 mi). It takes the passenger from Lake Geneva to the foothills of the Jura mountains. The route is a little circuitous and avoids any major climb, the maximum gradient being 1 in 28 (35.7 mm/m or 3.57%). From the village of Apples there is a 10.6 kilometres (6.6 mi) long branch line to serve L'Isle. This branch line faces towards Bière and any traffic from the Morges direction has to reverse to gain access. In more recent times a short 2 km (1.2 mi) branch line has been built from a point about 1 km (0.62 mi) prior to Bière to serve a Swiss army installation and this provides military traffic for the railway, in particular trains of tanks carried on standard gauge flat wagons mounted on metre gauge carrying trucks. The line is electrified at 15 kV 16.7 Hz AC.

== Pre-electrification ==
Built for the opening of the main line section the BAM possessed three tender locomotives of the type G 3/3. These were built by SLM, Works No's. 883, 884, and 885 in 1894. They gained a 4th locomotive from the Apples - L'Isle Railway which became No.4. This, again was a product of SLM being Works No. 999 and being completed in 1896. In 1921 it acquired a 5th locomotive, another SLM product, the former SBB-CFF-FFS-Brunigbahn G 3/3 number 109 (Works No. 1341) which became their number 6. This locomotive was sold to a sawmill in Biel/Bienne after electrification and is now preserved at the Blonay–Chamby Museum Railway. The 6th and final steam locomotive in the fleet, HG3/4 No.7, bought second-hand in 1941 from the Furka-Oberalp Railway, was again a product of the SLM, works No. 2417, built in 1914. The rack equipment was removed making it a class G3/4. On arrival of no. 7, the army requested that no. 2 be sent to Montbovon as a strategical reserve, from where it came back after the War, 1945, only to be scrapped. In the year of electrification, 1943, no. 4 was rebuilt as snow plough. No. 3 was scrapped in 1944. The remaining two locomotives, no. 1 and 7, were sold in 1946 to Voies ferrées du Dauphiné in France. (Note: There was no No.5 in the fleet list)

== Locomotives and rolling stock ==
=== Current fleet ===
==== Metre-gauge equipment ====
Type	Class	Quantity	Manufacturer	No.	Name	Built in	Notes	Pictures (type)
Passenger equipment
Electric motor coach	Be 4/4	3	ACMV / SIG / SAAS	11	–	1981	–	
Electric motor coach	Be 4/4	3	ACMV / SIG / SAAS	12	–	1981	–	
Electric motor coach	Be 4/4	3	ACMV / SIG / SAAS	14	–	1981	–	
Control car	Bt	4	ACMV	51	–	1982	Modernised in 2015	
Control car	Bt	4	ACMV	52	–	1982	Awaiting modernisation or sale	
Control car	Bt	4	ACMV	53	–	1982	–	
Control car	Bt	4	ACMV	54	–	1982	Bought in 2005 from Yverdon–Ste-Croix, modernised in 2015.	
Electric multiple unit	Be 4/4+B+Be 4/4	4 × 2	Stadler Rail	31/32	Le Joran	2015	Meter gauge derivative of the Stadler FLIRT.	
Electric multiple unit	Be 4/4+B+Be 4/4	4 × 2	Stadler Rail	33/34	–	2015	Meter gauge derivative of the Stadler FLIRT.	
Electric multiple unit	Be 4/4+B+Be 4/4	4 × 2	Stadler Rail	35/36	–	2015	Meter gauge derivative of the Stadler FLIRT.	
Electric multiple unit	Be 4/4+B+Be 4/4	4 × 2	Stadler Rail	37/38	–	2015	Meter gauge derivative of the Stadler FLIRT.	
Passenger car	B	4	Stadler Rail	2065	–	2010	Received in 2010, central access, low floor.	
Passenger car	B	4	Stadler Rail	2066	–	2010	Received in 2010, central access, low floor.	
Passenger car	B	4	Stadler Rail	2067	–	2010	Received in 2010, central access, low floor.	
Passenger car	B	4	Stadler Rail	2068	–	2015	Received in 2010, central access, low floor.	
Historic trains
Electric motor coach	BDe 4/4	1	SWS / SAAS	2	–	1943	Historic train still used for events. 5 of this type purchased, 4 out of service.	
Passenger car	AB 25	1	SIG	25	–	1925	Historic train still used for events. Formerly known as BC4 25. 60 seats (12 in first class, 48 in second).	
Passenger car	Br	1	–	31	–	1895	Historic train still used for events. It was converted to a bar train with 10 seats.	
Transport car	G 109	1	SIG / BAM	–	–	1895 / 1944	Historic train still used for events. Formerly a postal car that was transformed into a kitchen for events.	
Freight equipment
Electric locomotive	Ge 4/4	2	SLM / BBC	21	La Morges	1994	Locomotive similar to the Ge 4/4 III of the RhB, and the Ge 4/4 MOB.	
Electric locomotive	Ge 4/4	2	SLM / BBC	22	La Venoge	1994	Locomotive similar to the Ge 4/4 III of the RhB, and the Ge 4/4 MOB.	
Hybrid diesel-electric locomotive	–	0 (+ 3 on order)	Stadler Rail	–	–	2027 - 28	1 ordered in 2024, 2 in 2025. The MOB, RhB and MGBahn have ordered this type.	(illustration)
Hybrid diesel-electric locomotive	–	0 (+ 3 on order)	Stadler Rail	–	–	2027 - 28	1 ordered in 2024, 2 in 2025. The MOB, RhB and MGBahn have ordered this type.	(illustration)
Hybrid diesel-electric locomotive	–	0 (+ 3 on order)	Stadler Rail	–	–	2027 - 28	1 ordered in 2024, 2 in 2025. The MOB, RhB and MGBahn have ordered this type.	(illustration)
Rollbock	–	–	–	–	–	–	Bogies used to transport standard gauge wagons on narrow gauge lines.	
Utility equipment
Diesel Kleinlokomotive	Tm 2/2	1	RACO	41	Boubou	1990	Utility train equipped with a FASSI F150 knuckle boom crane. and with a bed for transporting tools and equipment.	
Rail service vehicle	–	2	–	Ua 154	–	–	Utility / transport wagons.	
Rail service vehicle	–	2	–	Ua 158	–	–	Utility / transport wagons.	
Rail service vehicle	–	1	–	159	–	–	Utility / transport wagons.	
Rail service vehicle	–	1	–	107	–	–	Utility / transport wagons.	
Rail service vehicle	BAM X	1	–	X11	–	–	Utility / transport wagons.	
Rail service vehicle (rail transport)	BAM X	2	–	X12	–	–	–	
Rail service vehicle (rail transport)	BAM X	2	–	X13	–	–	–	
Draisine	Dm	1	–	–	–	1974	–	–

==== Standard gauge equipment ====
Type	Class	Quantity	Manufacturer	No.	Name	Built in	Notes	Pictures
Freight equipment
Electric locomotive	Re 420.5	1	SLM / BBC / MFO / SAAS	506	–	1964	Purchased second-hand in 2013 from the BLS.	
Electric shunter	Te 2/2	2	SLM / MFO	147	–	1965	Purchased second-hand in 2007 from the SBB (Te III 147 / 155)	
Electric shunter	Te 2/2	2	SLM / MFO	155	–	1965	Purchased second-hand in 2007 from the SBB (Te III 147 / 155)	
Diesel shunter	Tm IV	1	SLM / MFO	–	–	1975	Purchased second-hand in 2016 from the SBB (98 85 5232 134-7)	
Hopper car (tipping)	Fans-u	19	Josef Meyer	530	–	1995	Used to transport sand from Apples. The 515 and the 522 were sold.	
Hopper car (tipping)	Fans-u	19	Josef Meyer	510-529	–	2000	Used to transport sand from Apples. The 515 and the 522 were sold.	
Hopper car	Faccns	9	Legios (CZ)	257 - 265	–	2016	Used to transport sand from Apples.	

=== Retired fleet ===
==== Metre-gauge equipment ====
Type	Class	Quantity	Manufacturer	No.	Name	Built in	Notes	Pictures
Electric motor coach
Electric motor coach	BDe 4/4	4	SWS / SAAS	1	–	1943	5 acquired, 1 remain in service as a historic train for events. Retirement: BDe 4/4 1: retired in 1993 (following an accident); BDe 4/4 4: retired in 1994; BDe 4/4 3: retired in 2010; BDe 4/4 5: dismantled in 2023	
Electric motor coach	BDe 4/4	4	SWS / SAAS	3	–	1943	5 acquired, 1 remain in service as a historic train for events. Retirement: BDe 4/4 1: retired in 1993 (following an accident); BDe 4/4 4: retired in 1994; BDe 4/4 3: retired in 2010; BDe 4/4 5: dismantled in 2023	
Electric motor coach	BDe 4/4	4	SWS / SAAS	4	–	1943	5 acquired, 1 remain in service as a historic train for events. Retirement: BDe 4/4 1: retired in 1993 (following an accident); BDe 4/4 4: retired in 1994; BDe 4/4 3: retired in 2010; BDe 4/4 5: dismantled in 2023	
Electric motor coach	BDe 4/4	4	SWS / SAAS	5	–	1949	5 acquired, 1 remain in service as a historic train for events. Retirement: BDe 4/4 1: retired in 1993 (following an accident); BDe 4/4 4: retired in 1994; BDe 4/4 3: retired in 2010; BDe 4/4 5: dismantled in 2023	
Electric motor coach	Be 4/4	1	ACMV / SIG / SAAS	15	–	1981	Bought in 2005 from Yverdon–Ste-Croix; Returned to Yverdon–Ste-Croix in 2015. Reacquired in June 2020, used or its parts.	
Steam locomotives
Steam locomotive	G 3/3	6	SLM	1	–	1895	Used until 1946.: G 3/3 1: dismantled in 1951; G 3/3 2: dismantled in 1945; G 3/3 3: dismantled in 1934; G 3/3 4: dismantled in 1943; G 3/3 6: acquired second hand from Brünig G 3/3 109), sold to the Renfer sawmill (in Biel).; G 3/3 7: sold in 1946	
Steam locomotive	G 3/3	6	SLM	2	–	1895	Used until 1946.: G 3/3 1: dismantled in 1951; G 3/3 2: dismantled in 1945; G 3/3 3: dismantled in 1934; G 3/3 4: dismantled in 1943; G 3/3 6: acquired second hand from Brünig G 3/3 109), sold to the Renfer sawmill (in Biel).; G 3/3 7: sold in 1946	
Steam locomotive	G 3/3	6	SLM	3	–	1895	Used until 1946.: G 3/3 1: dismantled in 1951; G 3/3 2: dismantled in 1945; G 3/3 3: dismantled in 1934; G 3/3 4: dismantled in 1943; G 3/3 6: acquired second hand from Brünig G 3/3 109), sold to the Renfer sawmill (in Biel).; G 3/3 7: sold in 1946	
Steam locomotive	G 3/3	6	SLM	4	–	1896	Used until 1946.: G 3/3 1: dismantled in 1951; G 3/3 2: dismantled in 1945; G 3/3 3: dismantled in 1934; G 3/3 4: dismantled in 1943; G 3/3 6: acquired second hand from Brünig G 3/3 109), sold to the Renfer sawmill (in Biel).; G 3/3 7: sold in 1946	
Steam locomotive	G 3/3	6	SLM	6	–	1901	Used until 1946.: G 3/3 1: dismantled in 1951; G 3/3 2: dismantled in 1945; G 3/3 3: dismantled in 1934; G 3/3 4: dismantled in 1943; G 3/3 6: acquired second hand from Brünig G 3/3 109), sold to the Renfer sawmill (in Biel).; G 3/3 7: sold in 1946	
Steam locomotive	G 3/3	6	SLM	7	–	1914	Used until 1946.: G 3/3 1: dismantled in 1951; G 3/3 2: dismantled in 1945; G 3/3 3: dismantled in 1934; G 3/3 4: dismantled in 1943; G 3/3 6: acquired second hand from Brünig G 3/3 109), sold to the Renfer sawmill (in Biel).; G 3/3 7: sold in 1946	
Passenger cars
Passenger car	FFA1 coaches	4	FFA / SIG	61	–	1964	Former numbers: 26, 27, 28, 29. Sold in 2019 to the SNCFG (Guinea Conakry).	
Passenger car	FFA1 coaches	4	FFA / SIG	62	–	1964	Former numbers: 26, 27, 28, 29. Sold in 2019 to the SNCFG (Guinea Conakry).	
Passenger car	FFA1 coaches	4	FFA / SIG	63	–	1964	Former numbers: 26, 27, 28, 29. Sold in 2019 to the SNCFG (Guinea Conakry).	
Passenger car	FFA1 coaches	4	FFA / SIG	64	–	1964	Former numbers: 26, 27, 28, 29. Sold in 2019 to the SNCFG (Guinea Conakry).	
Passenger car	B	2	SIG	72	–	1916	Purchased second hand from the SZB in 1982. Sold to the Chemin de fer de Bon-Repos in August 2012 (France).	
Passenger car	B	2	SIG	73	–	1916	Purchased second hand from the SZB in 1982. Donated to the Ligne Fianarantsoa-Côte Est (Madagascar) in April 2014.	

Abbreviations

- ACMV Ateliers de constructions mécaniques de Vevey.
- BBC Brown, Boveri & Cie
- FFA Flug- und Fahrzeugwerke Altenrhein AG
- SAAS Société Anonyme des Ateliers de Sécheron
- SIG Schweizerische Industrie Gesellschaft (German for Swiss Industrial Society)
- SLM Swiss Locomotive and Machine Works, Winterthur.
- Travys Transports Vallée-de-Joux - Yverdon-les-Bains - Sainte-Croix S.A.
- YSteC Compagnie du Chemin de fer Yverdon - Ste-Croix

== Services ==
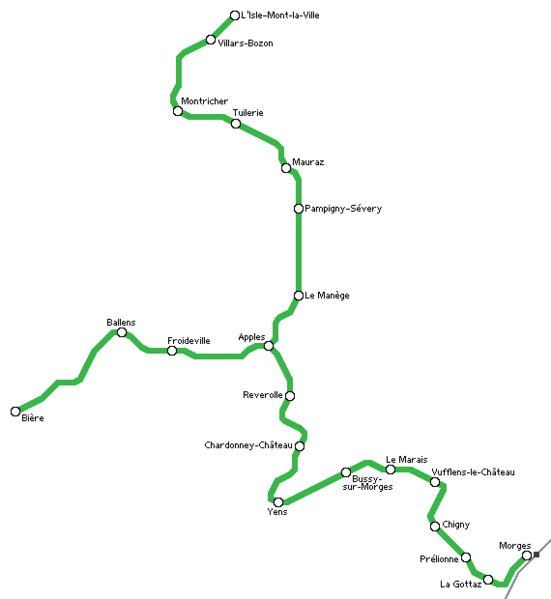
The BAM system

Services are normally provided by electric railcars of class Be 4/4, hauling either voiture pilote (driving trailers), delivered in 1982 and built by ACMV/SAAS, or coaches, or both. The two modern Ge 4/4 locomotives deal with freight traffic, the most obvious difference to the Montreux–Lenk im Simmental line and RhB locomotives is the addition of standard gauge buffers for use with standard gauge wagons.

== Livery ==
Livery is green/cream. Ex-Travys vehicles 15 and 54 started service sporting the YSteC red/cream livery. The two standard gauge shunting locomotives still sport their SBB red livery (at June 2010) and it is not known if they are to be repainted in BAM Green

== Accident ==
A fatal accident took place on 27 October 1997 when a train heading towards Bière collided with a tractor at a level crossing near Bussy-sur-Morges. The train derailed and crashed into a metal catenary support mast killing the train driver instantly. Four injured passengers were taken to hospital.

== Transfer traffic ==
The company also owns two Class Te ^{III} locomotives based on the standard gauge lines at Morge where they shunt traffic for the metre gauge lines and mount this into metre gauge carrier bogies "piggy-back" style. These are numbered 147 and 155 and were built by SLM/MFO.

== The future ==
From December 2004 the BAM, along with TL, LEB, CarPostal Suisse and CFF became part of a joint fare system, called Mobilis Vaud. This includes weekly, monthly and yearly passes. From December 2009 this fare system will be extended to cover the Riviera and North Vaudois and in the following year to Nyon and Gland. The final section in the jigsaw will be the inclusion of the Chablais Vaudois area.

== See also ==
- List of railway companies in Switzerland
