= Transports de la région Morges-Bière-Cossonay =

- Industry: Public transport
- Predecessor: Compagnie du Chemin de fer de Bière-Apples-Morges
- Founded: 2003
- Headquarters: Morges, Switzerland
- Key people: Pierre-Alain Perren (CEO)
- Products: Train, funicular, bus network
- Revenue: ▲CHF 52,971,887 (2022); CHF 50,582,179 (2021)
- Number of employees: 320 (2023)
- Website: mbc.ch

The Transports de la région Morges-Bière-Cossonay (MBC) is a Swiss public transport operator the in canton of Vaud. It operates two metre-gauge lines, Morges–Apples–Bière line and the Apples–L'Isle branch line, a funicular and a bus network.

== History ==
The history of the company, founded on 20 February 1894 under the name Compagnie du Chemin de fer de Bière-Apples-Morges (BAM), is closely linked to that of the Bière-Apples-Morges railway line, of which it has been the sole operator since it opened in July 1895. In 1954, the company launched two bus routes from Morges, one to Apples and the other to Lussy-sur-Morges, operated with four vehicles and integrated into the PostBus network. In 1966, it began providing school transport services to the Morges secondary school.

In 1980, BAM created Transports publics de Morges & environs (TPM), a bus network whose first line linked Prélionne to Lonay. This network has seen four major extensions in its history, in 1985, 1994, 2000 and 2004.

In 2003, BAM changed its name to Transports de la région Morges-Bière-Cossonay (MBC). The 2000s saw the gradual integration of the company into the Mobilis Vaud fare network and the extension of the bus network.

On 9 December 2010, MBC merged with the company Funiculaire de la Gare à la Ville de Cossonay, operator of the Cossonay funicular (CG), followed by further extensions to the bus network until 2013, when the company decided to abandon the TPM brand and bring all its routes under its own name, MBC. In December 2013, the company also integrated the seven PostBus routes, including five regional routes and services to Cossonay, of Société des auto-transports du pied du Jura vaudois (SAPJV) following the termination of the contract. In financial difficulties, SAPJV was dissolved in 2016 following the failure of its proposed merger with MBC.

In 2021, the company planned to build a new bus depot near the Route de Préverenges to replace the one at Tolochenaz.

The bus network was restructured in 2018 and in 2022 it had its biggest reorganisation of the bus lines.

== Lines ==
Line	Route
Train
R56	Morges – Apples – Bière
R57	Apples – L'Isle
Bus
701	Tolochenaz, La Plantaz – Morges – Préverenges – St-Sulpice – Ecublens – Lausanne, Bourdonnette
702	Tolochenaz, Les Saux – Morges – Lonay – Echandens – Bussigny, gare sud
703	Morges, Marcelin – Lully – Lussy-sur-Morges, village
704	Echichens, village – Morges, Grassey
705	Lonay, parc – Préverenges – Denges – Echandens – Ecublens, EPFL Piccard
724	Morges, gare – Tolochenaz – St-Prex – Etoy – Allaman, gare sud
726	Morges, gare – Tolochenaz – Lully – Denens – Villars-sous-Yens – Lavigny, café
730	Morges, gare – Echichens – St-Saphorin-sur-Morges – Colombier – Vullierens – Cottens – Grancy – Senarclens – Cossonay-Ville, centre
735	Morges, gare – Echichens – Lonay – Bremblens – Romanel-sur-Morges – Aclens – Gollion – Allens – Cossonay-Ville, centre (– Lussery-Villars – Eclépens – La Sarraz – Orny, village)
736	Morges, gare – Echichens – Lonay – Bremblens – Romanel-sur-Morges – Aclens – Bussigny, gare sud
740	Morges, gare – Echichens – Monnaz – Vaux-sur-Morges – Clarmont – Reverolle – Apples, gare (– Sévery – Cottens – Pampigny, collège)
742	Montricher, gare – Mollens – Berolle – Bière, gare (– Bière, collège)
750	Cossonay-Penthalaz, gare – Cossonay-Ville – La Chaux – Chavannes-le-Veyron – Cuarnens – L'Isle – La Coudre – Mont-la-Ville, Le Battoir (– Mollendruz – L'Abbaye – Le Pont, gare)
752	Cossonay-Ville, centre – La Chaux – Chavannes-le-Veyron – Cuarnens – L'Isle – Montricher, Fondation Michalski
760	Cossonay-Ville – Dizy – Chevilly – Moiry – Ferreyres – La Sarraz, collège Guébettes
Funicular
2003	Cossonay-Penthalaz (Funi) – Cossonay-Ville

The 736 and 742 bus lines only operate on weekdays during certain hours. The 752 bus line only operates on week-ends.

== See also ==
- Bière–Apples–Morges railway
