= Chaise (disambiguation) =

A chaise is a light two- or four-wheeled traveling or pleasure carriage.

Chaise may also refer to:

- Chaise (river), a river in France
- Charles-Édouard Chaise (1759–1798), French neoclassical painter
- François de la Chaise (1624–1709), French Jesuit priest
- Julien Chaisse (born 1976), professor of law at the City University of Hong Kong

== See also ==
- Chaise longue (disambiguation)
- Chaize (disambiguation)
