= Chaize =

Chaize may refer to:

- Patrick Chaize (born 1963), French senator
- Château de la Chaize, a French chateau
- La Chaize-Giraud, a French commune
- La Chaize-le-Vicomte, a French commune

== See also ==
- Chaise (disambiguation)
