= Juriens =

- Municipality
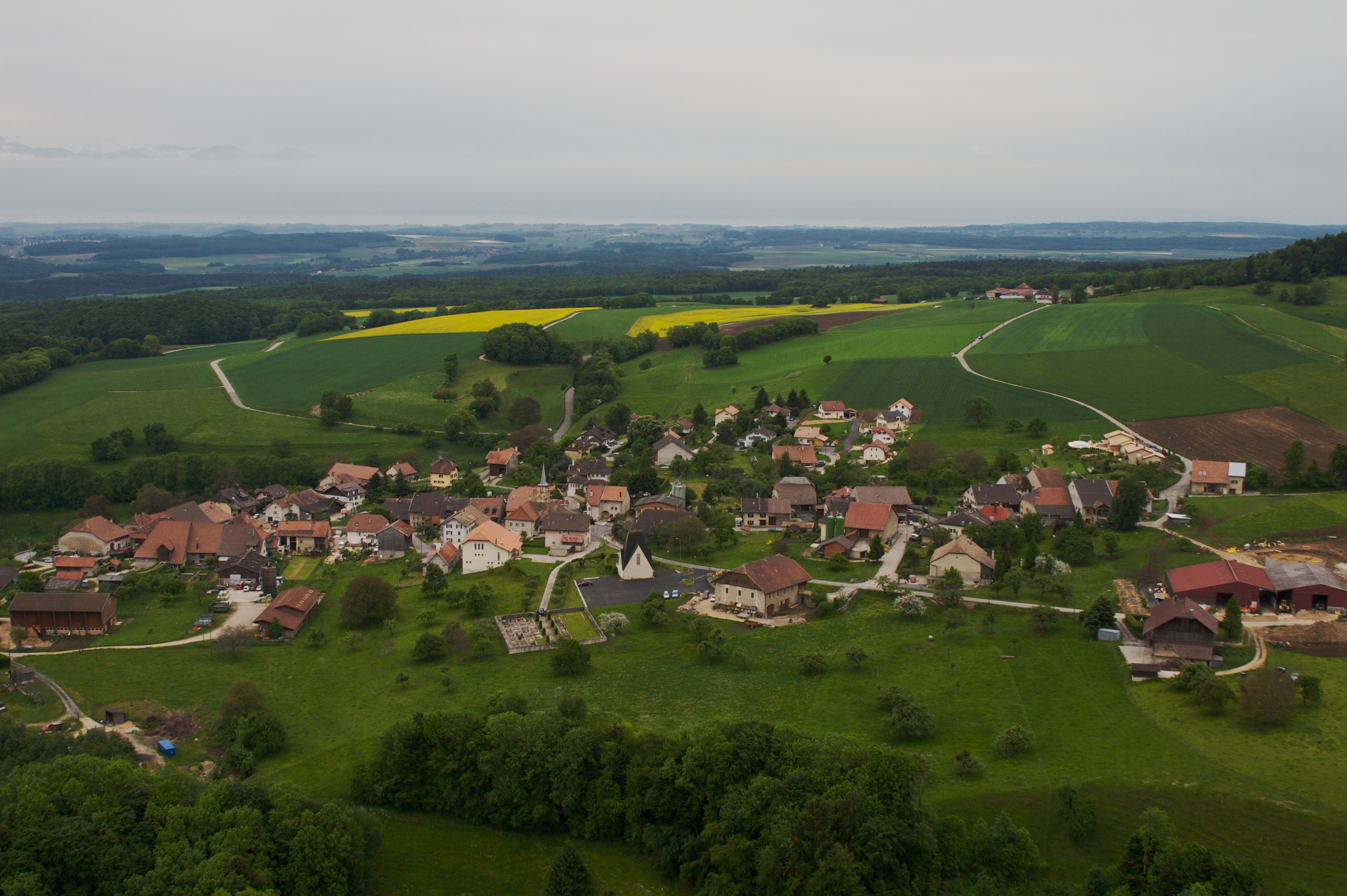
- Juriens village

- Flag Coat of arms
- Location of Juriens
- Location within Switzerland Location within Canton of Vaud
- Coordinates: 46°41′N 06°27′E
- Country: Switzerland
- Canton: Vaud
- District: Jura-Nord Vaudois

Government
  - Mayor: Syndic; Christian Grandjean

Area
  - Total: 9.4 km^{2} (3.6 sq mi)
- Elevation: 792 m (2,598 ft)

Population (2004)
  - Total: 254
  - Density: 27/km^{2} (70/sq mi)
- Demonym: Lè Lemaçon
- Time zone: UTC+01:00 (CET)
  - Summer (DST): UTC+02:00 (CEST)
- Postal code: 1326
- SFOS number: 5754
- ISO 3166 code: CH-VD
- Localities: Le Cosson
- Surrounded by: Romainmôtier-Envy, Moiry, La Praz, Mont-la-Ville, Vaulion
- Website: www.juriens.ch

Juriens is a municipality in the district of Jura-Nord Vaudois in the canton of Vaud in Switzerland.

== History ==
Juriens is first mentioned in 1263 as iurians. In 1359 it was mentioned as Juriens.

== Geography ==
Juriens has an area, as of 2009, of 9.4 square kilometers (3.6 mi^{2}). Of this area, 4.35 km^{2} (1.68 mi^{2}) or 46.5% is used for agricultural purposes, while 4.69 km^{2} (1.81 mi^{2}) or 50.1% is forested. Of the rest of the land, 0.28 km^{2} (0.11 mi^{2}) or 3.0% is settled (buildings or roads) and 0.01 km^{2} (2.5 acres) or 0.1% is unproductive land.

Of the built up area, housing and buildings made up 1.6% and transportation infrastructure made up 1.2%. Out of the forested land, 47.8% of the total land area is heavily forested and 2.4% is covered with orchards or small clusters of trees. Of the agricultural land, 18.2% is used for growing crops and 10.7% is pastures and 17.4% is used for alpine pastures.

The municipality was part of the Orbe District until it was dissolved on 31 August 2006, and Juriens became part of the new district of Jura-Nord Vaudois.

The municipality is located on the slope of the Mollendruz. It consists of the village of Juriens and the hamlet of Cosson.

== Coat of arms ==
The blazon of the municipal coat of arms is Per pale Argent and Gules, a Pine-tree eradicated counterchanged.

== Demographics ==
Juriens has a population (as of December 2020) of 336. As of 2008, 1.1% of the population are resident foreign nationals. Over the last 10 years (1999–2009 ) the population has changed at a rate of 12.3%. It has changed at a rate of 16% due to migration and at a rate of -3.7% due to births and deaths.

Most of the population (as of 2000) speaks French (223 or 94.1%), with German being second most common (5 or 2.1%) and English being third (4 or 1.7%). and 1 person who speaks Romansh.

The age distribution, as of 2009, in Juriens is; 20 children or 7.3% of the population are between 0 and 9 years old and 44 teenagers or 16.1% are between 10 and 19. Of the adult population, 28 people or 10.2% of the population are between 20 and 29 years old. 37 people or 13.5% are between 30 and 39, 37 people or 13.5% are between 40 and 49, and 36 people or 13.1% are between 50 and 59. The senior population distribution is 38 people or 13.9% of the population are between 60 and 69 years old, 18 people or 6.6% are between 70 and 79, there are 16 people or 5.8% who are between 80 and 89.

As of 2000, there were 91 people who were single and never married in the municipality. There were 122 married individuals, 19 widows or widowers and 5 individuals who are divorced.

As of 2000, there were 98 private households in the municipality, and an average of 2.4 persons per household. There were 33 households that consist of only one person and 7 households with five or more people. Out of a total of 99 households that answered this question, 33.3% were households made up of just one person and there was 1 adult who lived with their parents. Of the rest of the households, there are 29 married couples without children, 34 married couples with children There was one single parent with a child or children.

In 2000 there were 30 single family homes (or 42.9% of the total) out of a total of 70 inhabited buildings. There were 17 multi-family buildings (24.3%), along with 20 multi-purpose buildings that were mostly used for housing (28.6%) and 3 other use buildings (commercial or industrial) that also had some housing (4.3%).

In 2000, a total of 98 apartments (86.0% of the total) were permanently occupied, while 8 apartments (7.0%) were seasonally occupied and 8 apartments (7.0%) were empty. As of 2009, the construction rate of new housing units was 0 new units per 1000 residents. The vacancy rate for the municipality, in 2010, was 0%.

The historical population is given in the following chart:

== Politics ==
In the 2007 federal election the most popular party was the FDP which received 30.03% of the vote. The next three most popular parties were the SVP (28.62%), the SP (17.94%) and the Green Party (11.68%). In the federal election, a total of 110 votes were cast, and the voter turnout was 52.6%.

== Economy ==
As of 2010, Juriens had an unemployment rate of 2.8%. As of 2008, there were 21 people employed in the primary economic sector and about 9 businesses involved in this sector. 4 people were employed in the secondary sector and there was 1 business in this sector. 49 people were employed in the tertiary sector, with 6 businesses in this sector. There were 103 residents of the municipality who were employed in some capacity, of which females made up 39.8% of the workforce.

In 2008 the total number of full-time equivalent jobs was 49. The number of jobs in the primary sector was 13, all of which were in agriculture. The number of jobs in the secondary sector was 4, all of which were in construction. The number of jobs in the tertiary sector was 32. In the tertiary sector; 4 or 12.5% were in wholesale or retail sales or the repair of motor vehicles, 5 or 15.6% were in a hotel or restaurant, and 22 or 68.8% were in health care.

In 2000, there were 28 workers who commuted into the municipality and 65 workers who commuted away. The municipality is a net exporter of workers, with about 2.3 workers leaving the municipality for every one entering. Of the working population, 4.9% used public transportation to get to work, and 63.1% used a private car.

== Religion ==
From the 2000 census, 23 or 9.7% were Roman Catholic, while 177 or 74.7% belonged to the Swiss Reformed Church. Of the rest of the population, there was 1 member of an Orthodox church, and there were 16 individuals (or about 6.75% of the population) who belonged to another Christian church. 26 (or about 10.97% of the population) belonged to no church, are agnostic or atheist, and 2 individuals (or about 0.84% of the population) did not answer the question.

== Education ==
In Juriens about 88 or (37.1%) of the population have completed non-mandatory upper secondary education, and 27 or (11.4%) have completed additional higher education (either university or a Fachhochschule). Of the 27 who completed tertiary schooling, 63.0% were Swiss men, 25.9% were Swiss women.

In the 2009/2010 school year there were a total of 33 students in the Juriens school district. In the Vaud cantonal school system, two years of non-obligatory pre-school are provided by the political districts. During the school year, the political district provided pre-school care for a total of 578 children of which 359 children (62.1%) received subsidized pre-school care. The canton's primary school program requires students to attend for four years. There were 11 students in the municipal primary school program. The obligatory lower secondary school program lasts for six years and there were 22 students in those schools.

As of 2000, there were 11 students in Juriens who came from another municipality, while 33 residents attended schools outside the municipality.
