= L'Isle Castle =

Castle in L'Isle, Switzerland

- L'Isle in Switzerland
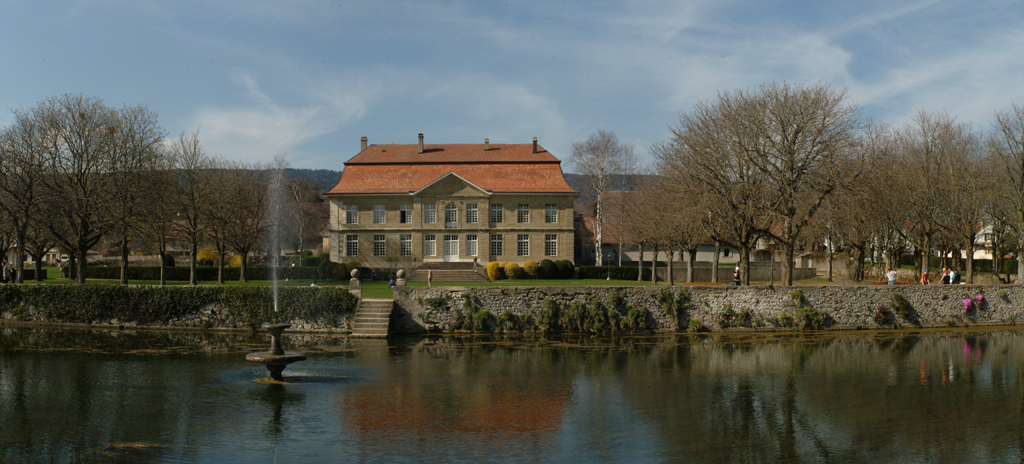
- The castle

Site information
- Type: Chateau
- Owner: Commune de L'Isle

Location
- Coordinates: 46°37′09″N 6°24′42″E

Site history
- Built: 1694
- Built by: Jules Hardouin-Mansart

Garrison information
- Occupants: Charles de Chandieu

Swiss Cultural Property of National Significance

L'Isle Castle is a castle in the municipality of L'Isle of the Canton of Vaud in Switzerland. It is a Swiss heritage site of national significance.

== History ==
L'Isle Castle was built in 1696 by Charles de Chandieu, lieutenant general of the Swiss Guards of Louis XIV, on plans by Jules Hardouin-Mansart, nephew of the great François Mansart. After the hands of different families, it was bought by the municipality of L'Isle in 1876 which transforms it into school classes and as home town.

== Architecture ==
L'Isle Castle draws a U-shaped plan, between courtyard and garden, with a main building, where are the reception rooms and apartments for teachers and two wings containing services (kitchen, pantry, servants' rooms) and secondary local (archives, library, attic). Note the impressive framing Mansard is in perfect condition. In French-speaking Switzerland, the castle of L'Isle is the first regional example of French classicism and is a key milestone in the dissemination of this current. In 1710, a French garden, with ponds and two rows of trees are created. Waters of the Venoge river are used to establish a comprehensive water plan with a jet of water placed in the axis of the house. The lounge and dining room, the only two original parts furnished are used for cultural or official events. Once the cave was used as a kitchen and refectory for staff and as a prison. After its renovation, different parts of the vaulted and paved spaces are an ideal place for cultural and friendly activities.

== See also ==
- List of castles in Switzerland
- Château
