= L'Isle =

- Municipality
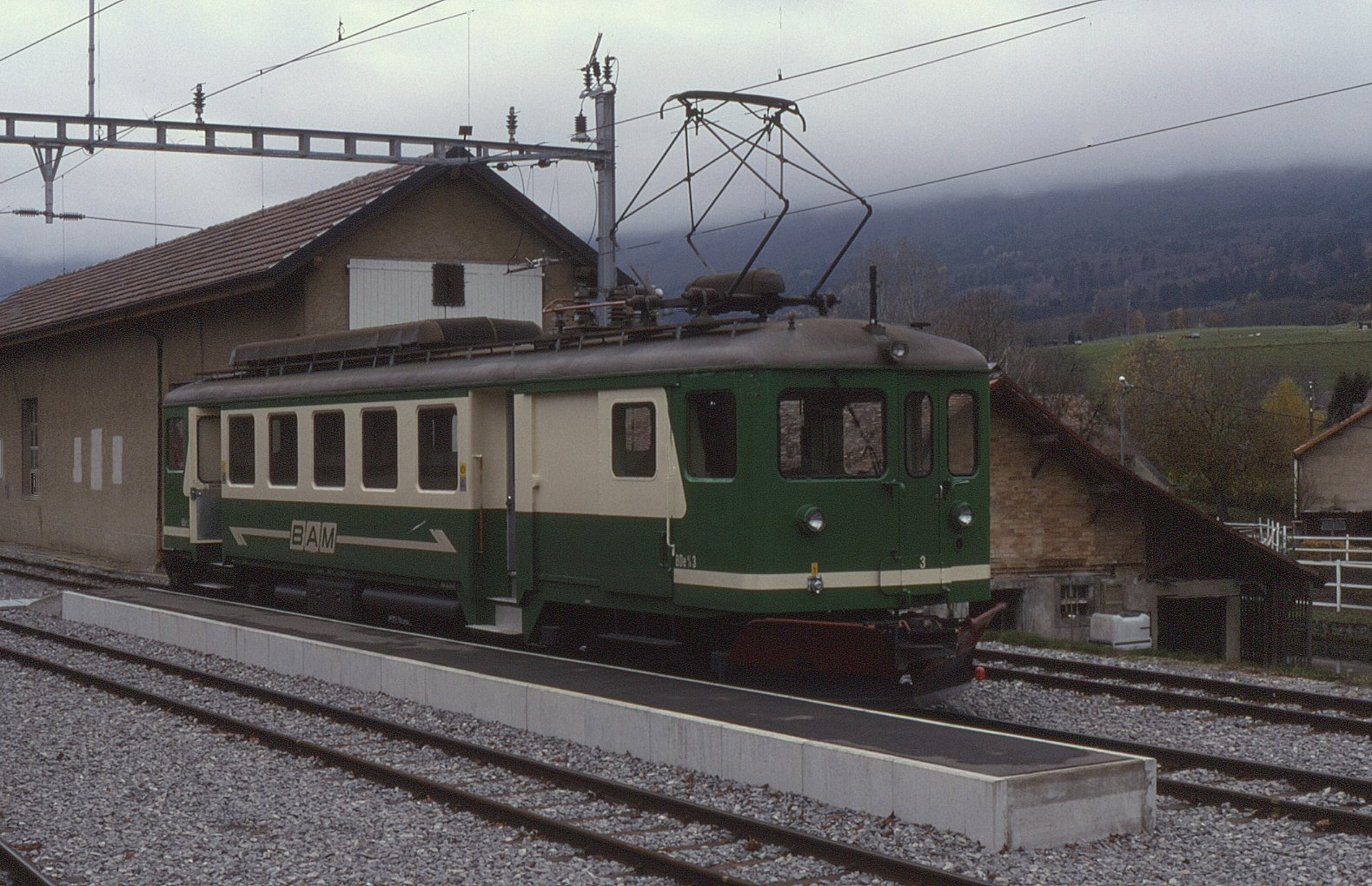

- Flag Coat of arms
- Location of L'Isle
- Location within Switzerland Location within Canton of Vaud
- Coordinates: 46°37′N 06°25′E
- Country: Switzerland
- Canton: Vaud
- District: Morges

Government
  - Mayor: Syndic

Area
  - Total: 16.21 km^{2} (6.26 sq mi)
- Elevation: 660 m (2,170 ft)

Population (2010)
  - Total: 990
  - Density: 61/km^{2} (160/sq mi)
- Time zone: UTC+01:00 (CET)
  - Summer (DST): UTC+02:00 (CEST)
- Postal code: 1148
- SFOS number: 5486
- ISO 3166 code: CH-VD
- Surrounded by: Mont-la-Ville, Cuarnens, Chavannes-le-Veyron, Pampigny, Mauraz, Montricher, L'Abbaye
- Website: www.lisle.ch

L'Isle is a municipality of the canton of Vaud in Western Switzerland, located in the district of Morges.

== History ==
L'Isle is first mentioned in 1216 as Chablie. In 1299 it was mentioned as Insula de Chablie and in 1324 as Lylaz.

== Geography ==
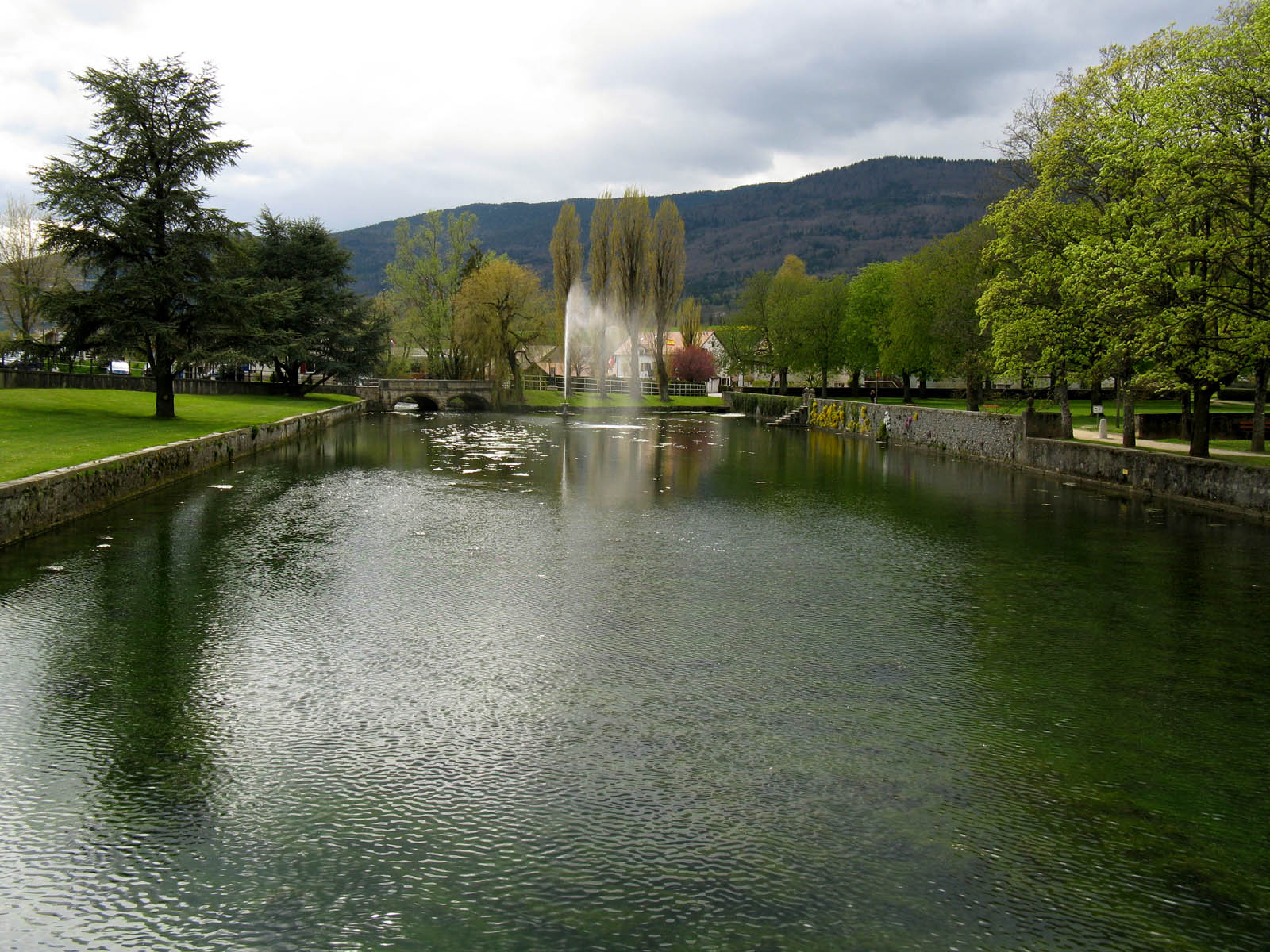
Pond at L'Isle Manor

Aerial view (1949)

L'Isle has an area, as of 2009, of 16.21 square kilometers (6.26 sq mi). Of this area, 7.78 km^{2} (3.00 sq mi) or 48.0% is used for agricultural purposes, while 7.57 km^{2} (2.92 sq mi) or 46.7% is forested. Of the rest of the land, 0.87 km^{2} (0.34 sq mi) or 5.4% is settled (buildings or roads) and 0.04 km^{2} (9.9 acres) or 0.2% is unproductive land.

Of the built up area, housing and buildings made up 2.5% and transportation infrastructure made up 2.0%. Out of the forested land, 43.9% of the total land area is heavily forested and 2.8% is covered with orchards or small clusters of trees. Of the agricultural land, 30.3% is used for growing crops and 10.5% is pastures and 6.8% is used for alpine pastures.

The municipality was part of the Cossonay District until it was dissolved on 31 August 2006, and L'Isle became part of the new district of Morges.

The municipality is located at the foot of the Jura Mountains at the sources and along the Venoge river. It consists of the village of L'Isle and the hamlets of Villars-Bozon, La Coudre, Les Mousses. The village of L'Isle is divided into four sections; la Ville, le Château, Chaby or Chabiez on the left side of the river and l'Avalanche on the right side.

== Coat of arms ==
The blazon of the municipal coat of arms is Per pale Argent and Azure, bordered Or.

== Demographics ==
L'Isle has a population (as of December 2020) of 1,064. As of 2008, 11.3% of the population are resident foreign nationals. Over the last 10 years (1999–2009 ) the population has changed at a rate of 12%. It has changed at a rate of 9.8% due to migration and at a rate of 0.5% due to births and deaths.

Most of the population (as of 2000) speaks French (807 or 94.1%), with German being second most common (23 or 2.7%) and Portuguese being third (11 or 1.3%). There is 1 person who speaks Italian and 1 person who speaks Romansh.

Of the population in the municipality 271 or about 31.6% were born in L'Isle and lived there in 2000. There were 336 or 39.2% who were born in the same canton, while 119 or 13.9% were born somewhere else in Switzerland, and 111 or 12.9% were born outside of Switzerland.

In 2008 there were 7 live births to Swiss citizens and 1 birth to non-Swiss citizens, and in same time span there were 11 deaths of Swiss citizens. Ignoring immigration and emigration, the population of Swiss citizens decreased by 4 while the foreign population increased by 1. There was 1 Swiss man and 2 Swiss women who emigrated from Switzerland. At the same time, there were 8 non-Swiss men and 4 non-Swiss women who immigrated from another country to Switzerland. The total Swiss population change in 2008 (from all sources, including moves across municipal borders) was an increase of 30 and the non-Swiss population increased by 13 people. This represents a population growth rate of 4.5%.

The age distribution, as of 2009, in L'Isle is; 91 children or 9.4% of the population are between 0 and 9 years old and 117 teenagers or 12.1% are between 10 and 19. Of the adult population, 135 people or 13.9% of the population are between 20 and 29 years old. 122 people or 12.6% are between 30 and 39, 151 people or 15.6% are between 40 and 49, and 144 people or 14.9% are between 50 and 59. The senior population distribution is 104 people or 10.7% of the population are between 60 and 69 years old, 55 people or 5.7% are between 70 and 79, there are 35 people or 3.6% who are between 80 and 89, and there are 14 people or 1.4% who are 90 and older.

As of 2000, there were 342 people who were single and never married in the municipality. There were 407 married individuals, 53 widows or widowers and 56 individuals who are divorced.

As of 2000, there were 359 private households in the municipality, and an average of 2.3 persons per household. There were 118 households that consist of only one person and 24 households with five or more people. Out of a total of 372 households that answered this question, 31.7% were households made up of just one person and there were 5 adults who lived with their parents. Of the rest of the households, there are 97 married couples without children, 113 married couples with children There were 19 single parents with a child or children. There were 7 households that were made up of unrelated people and 13 households that were made up of some sort of institution or another collective housing.

In 2000 there were 130 single family homes (or 51.4% of the total) out of a total of 253 inhabited buildings. There were 54 multi-family buildings (21.3%), along with 51 multi-purpose buildings that were mostly used for housing (20.2%) and 18 other use buildings (commercial or industrial) that also had some housing (7.1%). Of the single family homes 68 were built before 1919, while 3 were built between 1990 and 2000. The most multi-family homes (32) were built before 1919 and the next most (8) were built between 1971 and 1980.

In 2000 there were 409 apartments in the municipality. The most common apartment size was 3 rooms of which there were 106. There were 8 single room apartments and 134 apartments with five or more rooms. Of these apartments, a total of 337 apartments (82.4% of the total) were permanently occupied, while 61 apartments (14.9%) were seasonally occupied and 11 apartments (2.7%) were empty. As of 2009, the construction rate of new housing units was 0 new units per 1000 residents. The vacancy rate for the municipality, in 2010, was 0%.

The historical population is given in the following chart:

== Heritage sites of national significance ==
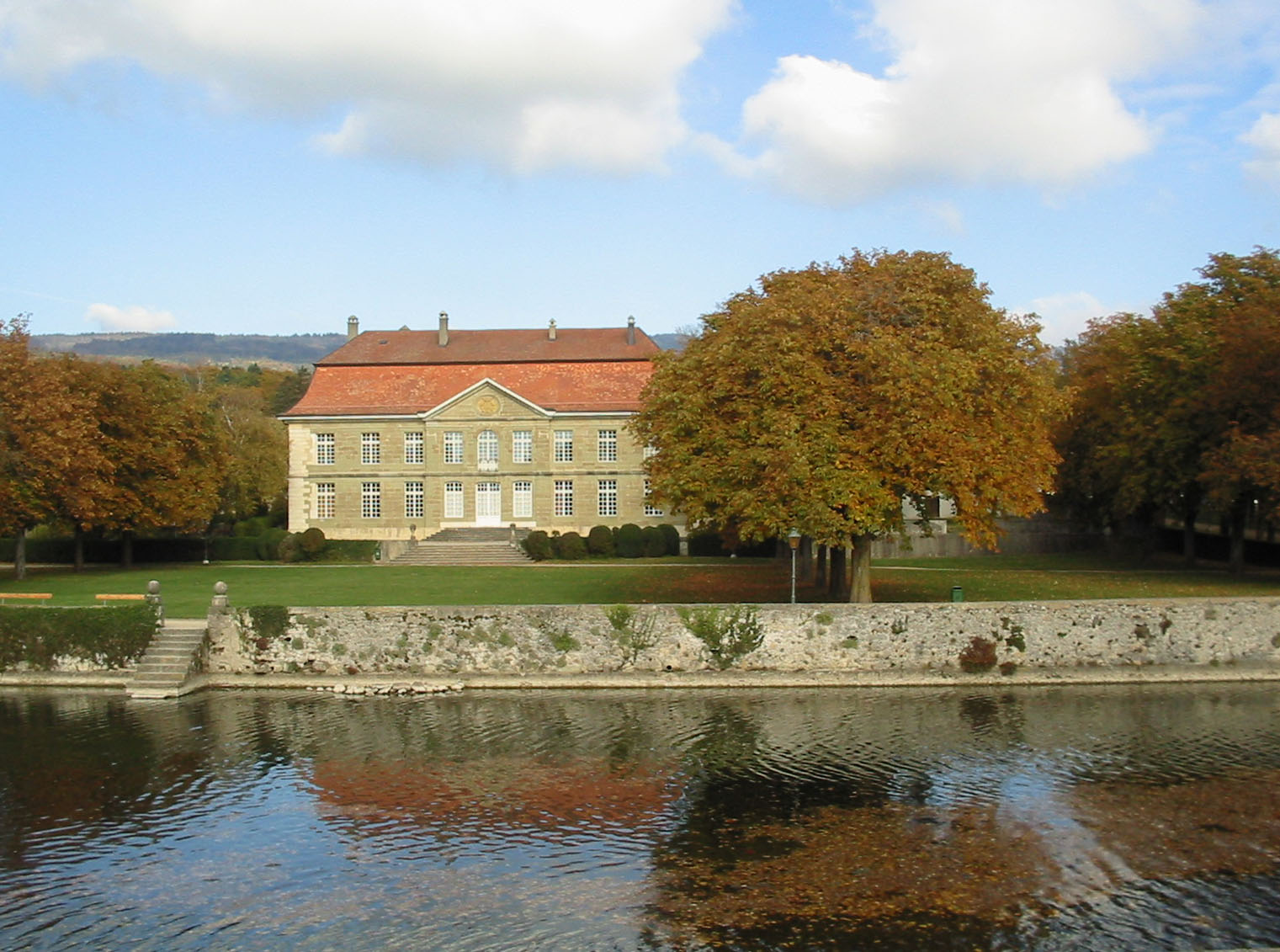
L'Isle Castle.

L'Isle Castle is listed as a Swiss heritage site of national significance. The entire L'Isle area is part of the Inventory of Swiss Heritage Sites.

The Venoge river passes through L'Isle, and feeds the Pond in front of the Manor, built by Charles de Chandieu between 1694 and 1696.

The Manor is now seat to the city hall and to 4 classrooms for the years 7 HarmoS (two classes) and 8 HarmoS (two classes).

== Politics ==
In the 2007 federal election the most popular party was the SVP which received 25.42% of the vote. The next three most popular parties were the FDP (18.66%), the Green Party (16.94%) and the SP (16.92%). In the federal election, a total of 242 votes were cast, and the voter turnout was 36.6%.

== Economy ==
As of 2010, L'Isle had an unemployment rate of 3.8%. As of 2008, there were 68 people employed in the primary economic sector and about 25 businesses involved in this sector. 88 people were employed in the secondary sector and there were 19 businesses in this sector. 178 people were employed in the tertiary sector, with 36 businesses in this sector. There were 462 residents of the municipality who were employed in some capacity, of which females made up 45.7% of the workforce.

In 2008 the total number of full-time equivalent jobs was 280. The number of jobs in the primary sector was 55, of which 39 were in agriculture, 8 were in forestry or lumber production and 8 were in fishing or fisheries. The number of jobs in the secondary sector was 80 of which 25 or (31.3%) were in manufacturing, 5 or (6.3%) were in mining and 50 (62.5%) were in construction. The number of jobs in the tertiary sector was 145. In the tertiary sector; 40 or 27.6% were in wholesale or retail sales or the repair of motor vehicles, 75 or 51.7% were in the movement and storage of goods, 5 or 3.4% were in a hotel or restaurant, 2 or 1.4% were the insurance or financial industry, 4 or 2.8% were technical professionals or scientists, 9 or 6.2% were in education and 3 or 2.1% were in health care.

In 2000, there were 165 workers who commuted into the municipality and 284 workers who commuted away. The municipality is a net exporter of workers, with about 1.7 workers leaving the municipality for every one entering. About 11.5% of the workforce coming into L'Isle are coming from outside Switzerland. Of the working population, 9.1% used public transportation to get to work, and 61.3% used a private car.

The municipality is served by a station on the Bière–Apples–Morges railway.

== Religion ==
From the 2000 census, 135 or 15.7% were Roman Catholic, while 573 or 66.8% belonged to the Swiss Reformed Church. Of the rest of the population, there were 2 members of an Orthodox church (or about 0.23% of the population), and there were 13 individuals (or about 1.52% of the population) who belonged to another Christian church. There were2 (or about 0.23% of the population) who were Islamic. There were 3 individuals who were Buddhist and 1 individual who belonged to another church. 102 (or about 11.89% of the population) belonged to no church, are agnostic or atheist, and 33 individuals (or about 3.85% of the population) did not answer the question.

== Education ==
In L'Isle about 341 or (39.7%) of the population have completed non-mandatory upper secondary education, and 104 or (12.1%) have completed additional higher education (either university or a Fachhochschule). Of the 104 who completed tertiary schooling, 46.2% were Swiss men, 37.5% were Swiss women, 10.6% were non-Swiss men and 5.8% were non-Swiss women.

In the 2009/2010 school year there were a total of 109 students in the L'Isle school district. In the Vaud cantonal school system, two years of non-obligatory pre-school are provided by the political districts. During the school year, the political district provided pre-school care for a total of 631 children of which 203 children (32.2%) received subsidized pre-school care. The canton's primary school program requires students to attend for four years. There were 50 students in the municipal primary school program. The obligatory lower secondary school program lasts for six years and there were 58 students in those schools. There were also 1 students who were home schooled or attended another non-traditional school.

As of 2000, there were 84 students in L'Isle who came from another municipality, while 114 residents attended schools outside the municipality.
