= Jules Hardouin-Mansart =

French architect and builder (1646–1708)

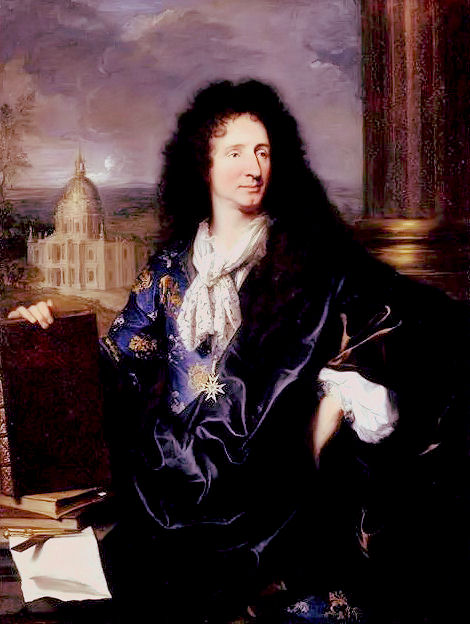
Portrait of Jules Hardoun Mansart by Hyacinthe Rigaud, with Les Invalides in background

Jules Hardouin-Mansart (French pronunciation: [ʒyl aʁdwɛ̃ mɑ̃saʁ]; 16 April 1646 – 11 May 1708) was a French Baroque architect and builder whose major work included the Place des Victoires (1684–1690); Place Vendôme (1690); the domed chapel of Les Invalides (1690), and the Grand Trianon of the Palace of Versailles. His monumental work was designed to glorify the reign of Louis XIV.

== Biography ==
Born Jules Hardouin in Paris in 1646, he studied under his renowned great-uncle François Mansart, one of the originators of the classical tradition in French architecture; Hardouin inherited Mansart's collection of plans and drawings and added Mansart's name to his own in 1668. He began his career as an entrepreneur in building construction, in partnership with his brother Michel, but then decided in 1672 to devote himself entirely to architecture. In 1674, he became one of the group of royal architects working for Louis XIV. His first important project was the Château de Clagny, built for the King's consort, Madame de Montespan. He quickly showed he was a master of bureaucratic diplomacy as well as design and construction; he gained the protection and support of Madame de Montespan, then François-Michel le Tellier, Marquis de Louvois, the Minister of War. He studied under and then collaborated with landscape designer André Le Nôtre, before finally working directly with the King himself.

In 1677, he began working on the expansion of the royal Palace of Versailles, a project which occupied him for the rest of his life. Soon afterward became a member of the Académie royale d'architecture. In 1678, he became director of the work at Versailles. and the most prominent architect in the royal entourage. He was named First Architect of the King in 1681 and was raised to the nobility in 1682. He became intendant of the King in 1685, and royal inspector-general of buildings 1691, under the elderly superintendent of buildings, Villacerf, whom he finally replaced in 1699.

He owed his rise not just for his ability to please his patron with his designs, but especially because of his ability to manage enormous and complex projects with many elements and designers. He would sketch out an idea; stand back and intervene and adjust when needed, from time to time to visit the site, and to see that the budget was kept under control.

In the latter part of his career he left more of the details to the architects who worked under him, notably Robert de Cotte, who was his chosen successor. He was given the title of Count of Sagonne in 1702, but died six months later at the royal Château de Marly.

== Style ==
Hardouin-Mansart was the leading master of the architectural style that became known as the Louis XIV style or French classicism. A particular skill of Hardouin was his ability to create a wide variety of structures; chateaux, churches, pavilions, private residences, parks, and urban squares. He demonstrated an ability to adapt, modify, enlarge and rehabilitate, without losing the character of the original building, but adding his own original variations on the theme, as he demonstrated in particular at the Palace of Versailles.

Much of his success was due to his ability to select and guide very talented collaborators. His collaborators included the interior designer Charles Le Brun, who designed many of the interiors of Versailles, in perfect harmony with his architecture, and Robert de Cotte, a designer who also became his brother-in-law and in 1708 became his successor, completing the major projects he had begun in the Palace of Versailles.

His architecture is especially characterized by simplification; by large smooth spaces, the repetition of forms (especially arcades with semicircular arches and detached columns; long horizontals, and detached open spaces. He often used long rows of columns in front of a façade to give an air of grandeur and to hide the irregularities of the structure. He used the architectural orders to give a special majesty to interior surfaces, particularly in the chapel of Versailles, and the interiors of the Palace of Versailles and the Grand Trianon.

He was adept at creating a sense of awe, as he demonstrated especially in the dome of Les Invalides (completed 1706) and in the garden façade of the Palace of Versailles, and in the Hall of Mirrors at Versailles.

== Major works ==
=== Les Invalides ===
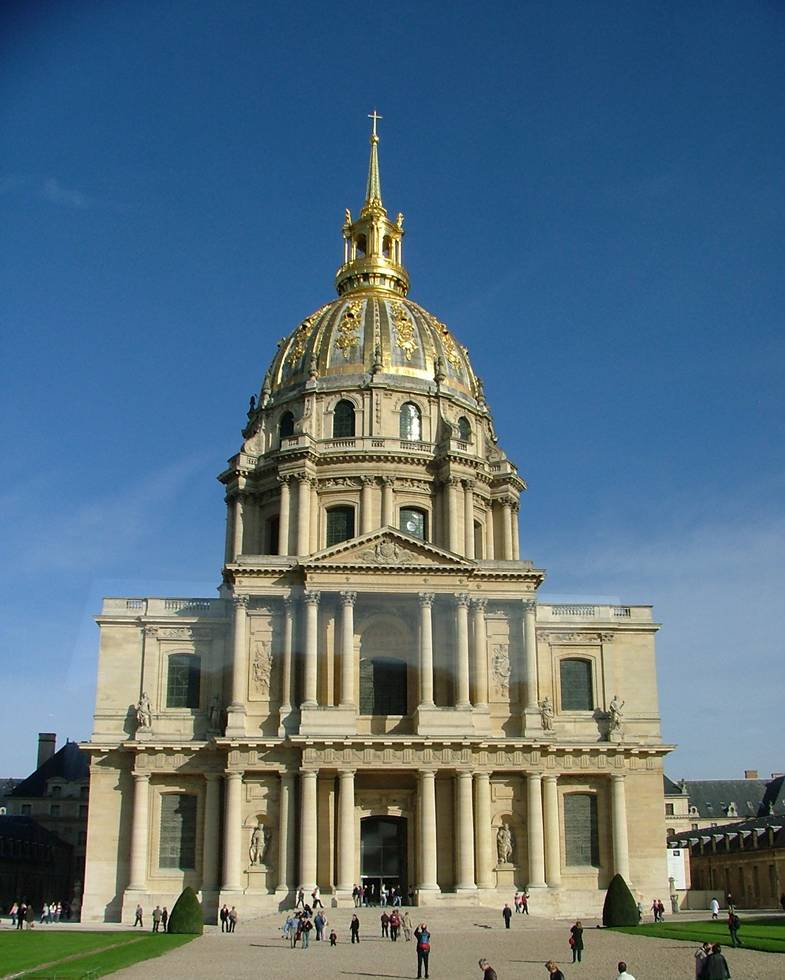
Church of the Hôtel des Invalides in Paris (1676–1691)

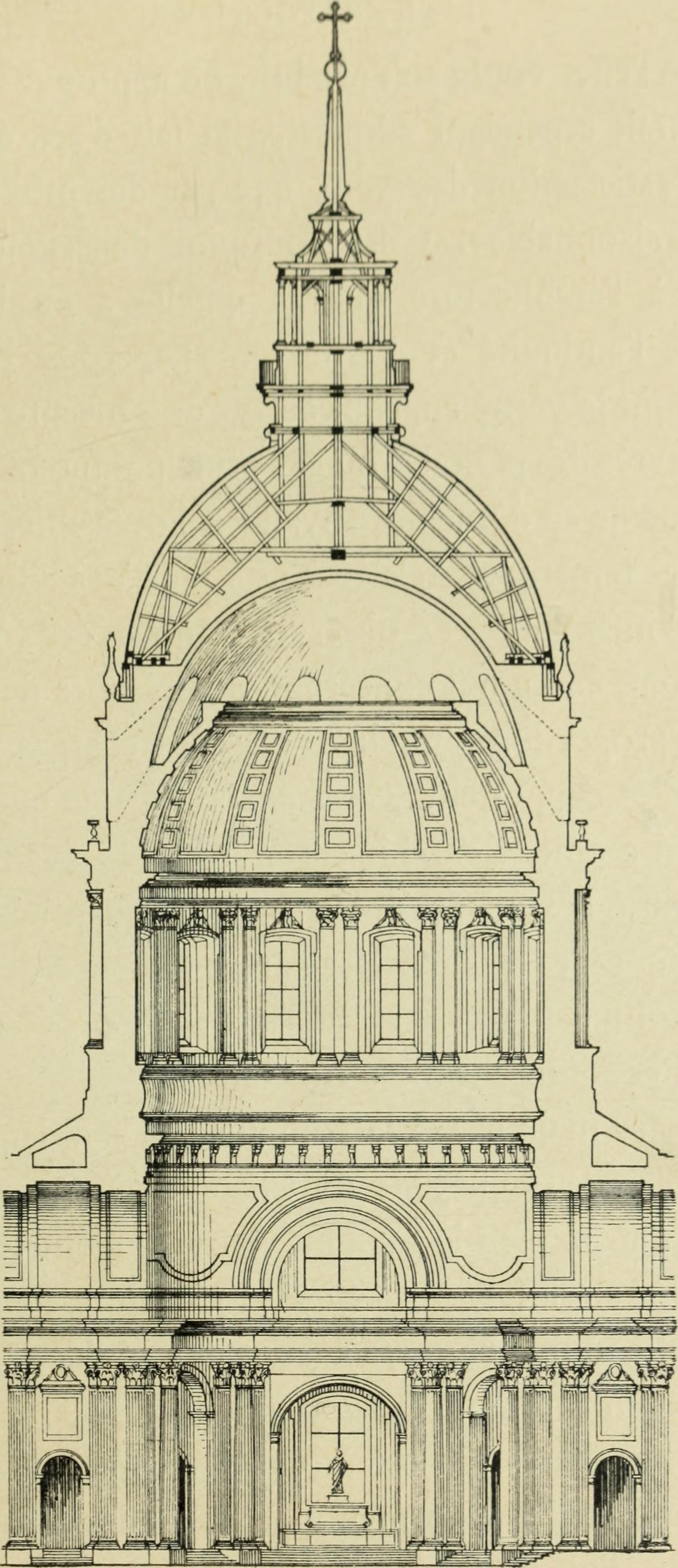
The outer dome conceals an inner dome, visible from below

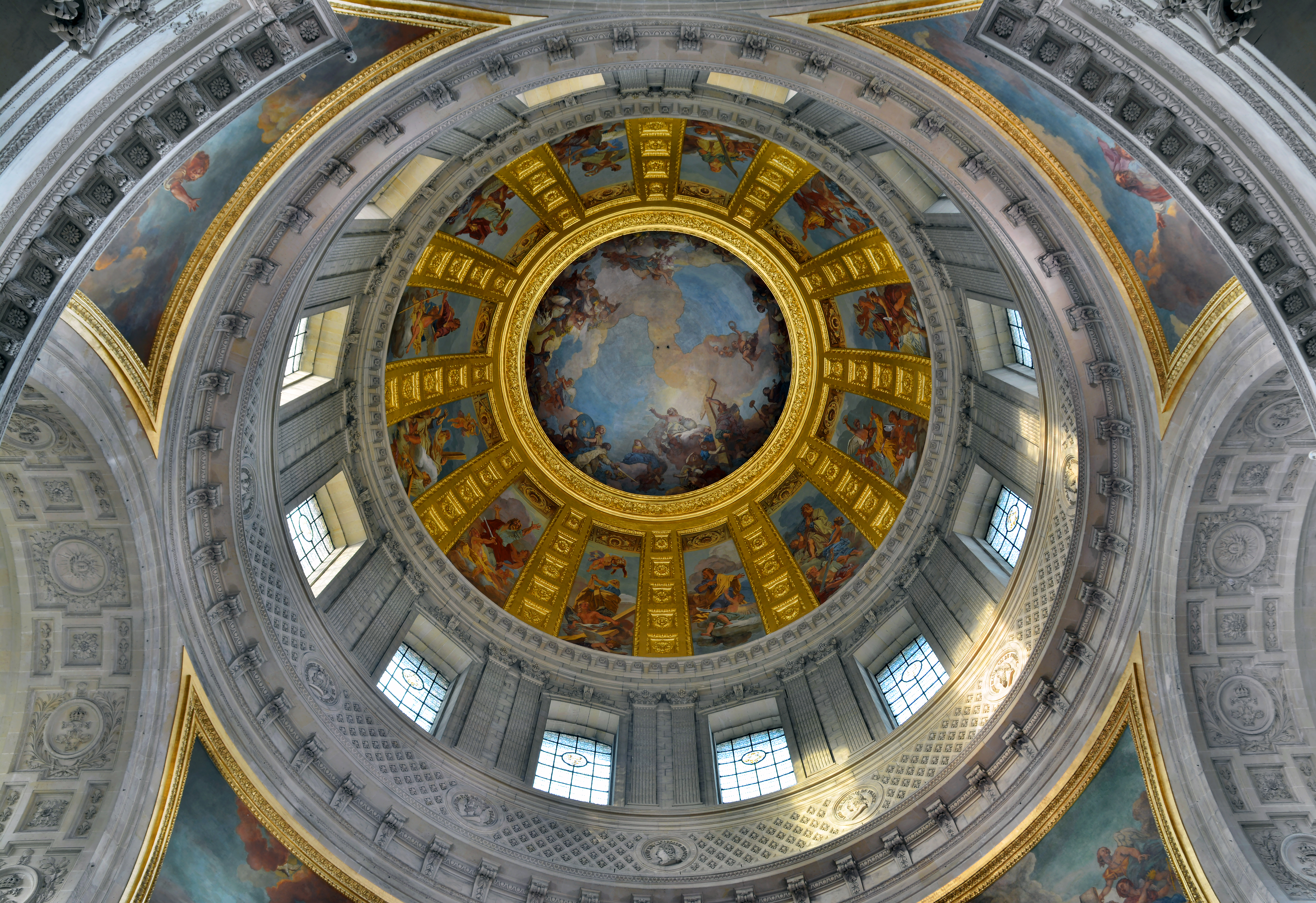
Inner dome of Les Invalides, seen from below

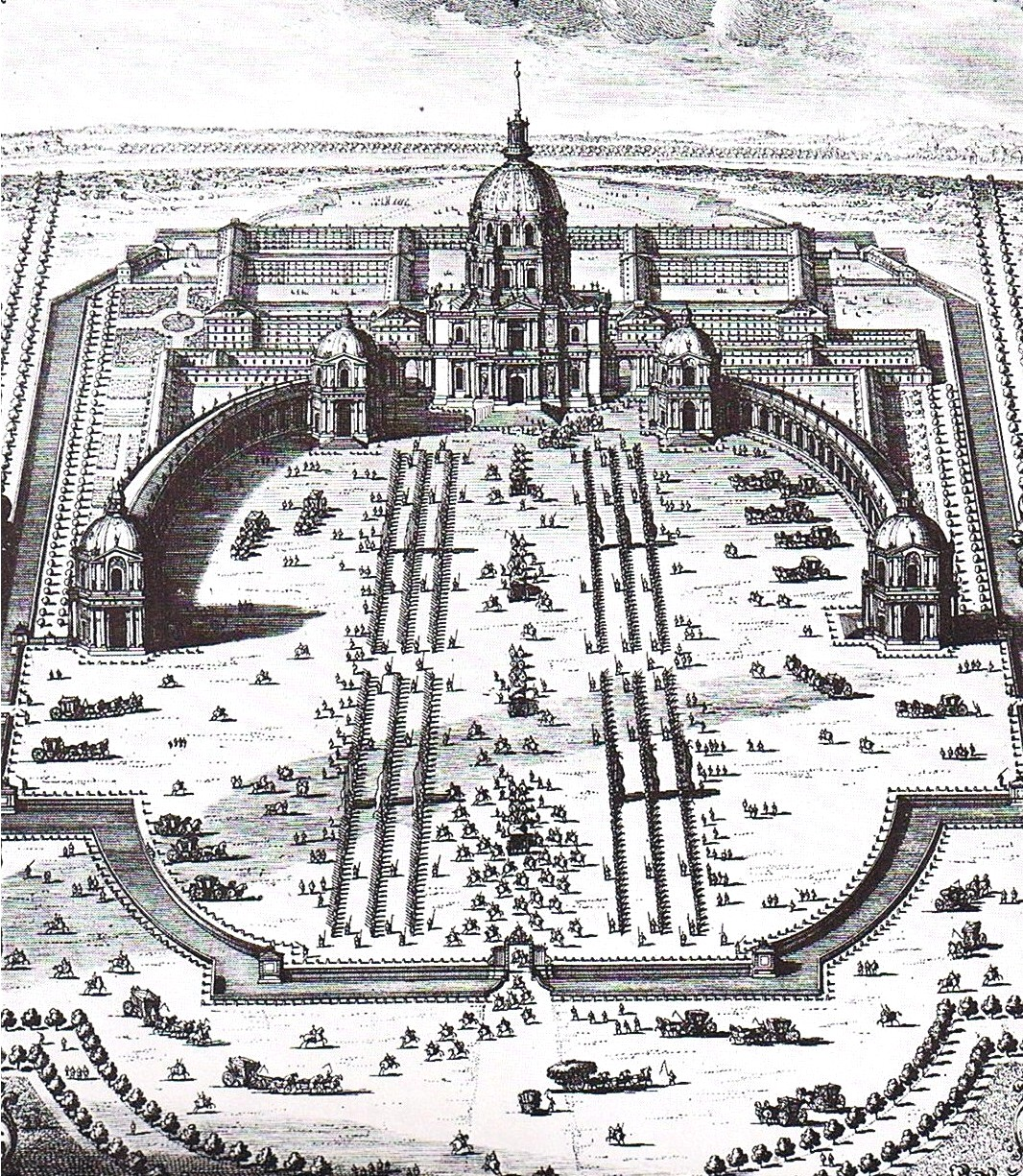
Hardouin-Mansard's plan for a curving colonnade of Les Invalides, not completed (1700)

On 1 March 1676 François-Michel le Tellier, Marquis de Louvois, the Minister of War, summoned Hardouin-Mansart to take over construction of Les Invalides, the enormous hospital and chapel the King was building in the center of Paris for his pensioned and wounded soldiers. The project had been begun in 1671 by Libéral Bruant, and some of the residential buildings were completed and already occupied, but the centerpiece, the chapel for the soldiers, had not been begun. The King was not satisfied with the plans that were offered to him by Bruant, and complained about the slowness of the work. On 1 March 1676 Louvois dismissed Bruant and summoned Hardouin-Mansart, who was little known outside the royal household, and asked him to take over the church.

The chapel originally planned by Bruant for the veterans was relatively modest in size and decoration. Hardouin-Mansart proposed a much more grandiose project with two adjoining parts; a choir for the pensioners, and a majestic domed royal church for the King. This was beyond what the Minister had proposed, but it apparently pleased the King, and, after long discussion, Hardouin-Mansart was given the project not only for the church, but for the Hôtel as well. Hardouin-Mansart briskly organized and completed the construction of residences and infirmaries for the pensioners. In 1676 he began work on the choir, the portion of the church intended for the pensioners. By the summer of 1677 the roof was in place, and in April 1678 he was able to order the woodwork of the stalls, and in 1679, the cabinetry for the organ.

The work on the royal chapel proceeded more slowly. Its distinctive feature was the dome, one of the earliest constructed in Paris, following the church of the Val-de-Grâce, designed by his great-uncle, François Mansart and Jacques Lemercier (1645–1667), and the Collège des Quatre-Nations (1662–1670). His original plan called for a single great space under the dome, and painted decoration on the interior of the dome. However, while the work was in progress, the French army suffered reverses in the Netherlands, and the Superintendent of Finances, Colbert, was slow in providing funding. Hardouin-Mansart had to modify the original plan, eliminating the painted ceiling, and redesigning the dome with an interior dome, not visible from the outside. He mounted the dome on two successive drums, giving it greater height than the earlier Paris domes. He commissioned the sculptor François Girardon to make statues illustrating the themes of the building, the virtues of the Saints and the French Kings. By 1690 a large group of sculptors was at work at statues for the niches of the façade. The war was followed by a financial crisis; work was halted entirely in 1695, and did not resume until the war ended in 1699. Once the war ended, constructed resumed, and the royal chapel was finally consecrated, in the presence of the King, on 22 August 1706, not long before the death of Hardouin-Mansart. It remains his most famous work.

=== The Palace of Versailles ===
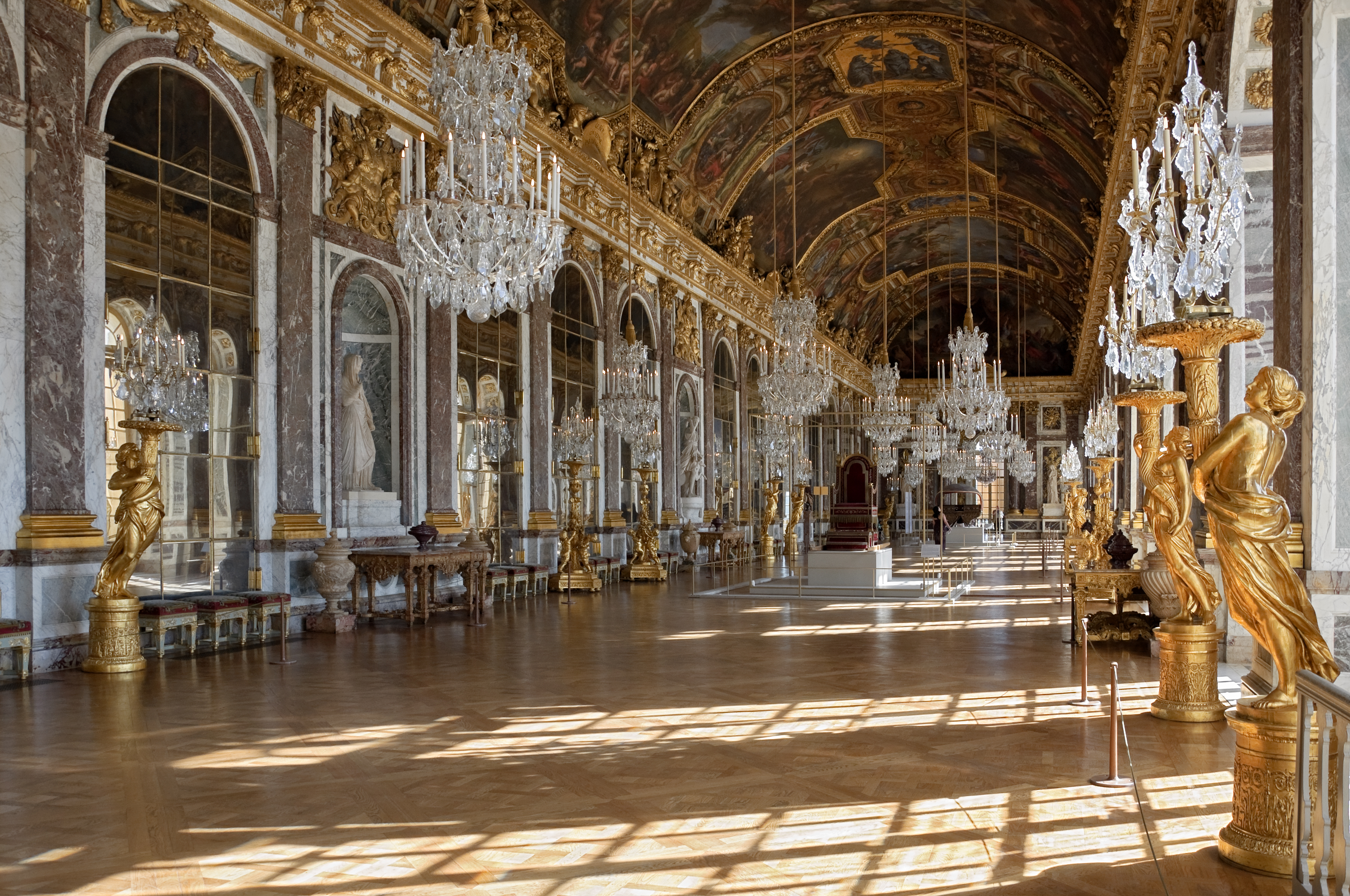
Hall of Mirrors of the Palace of Versailles (1680)

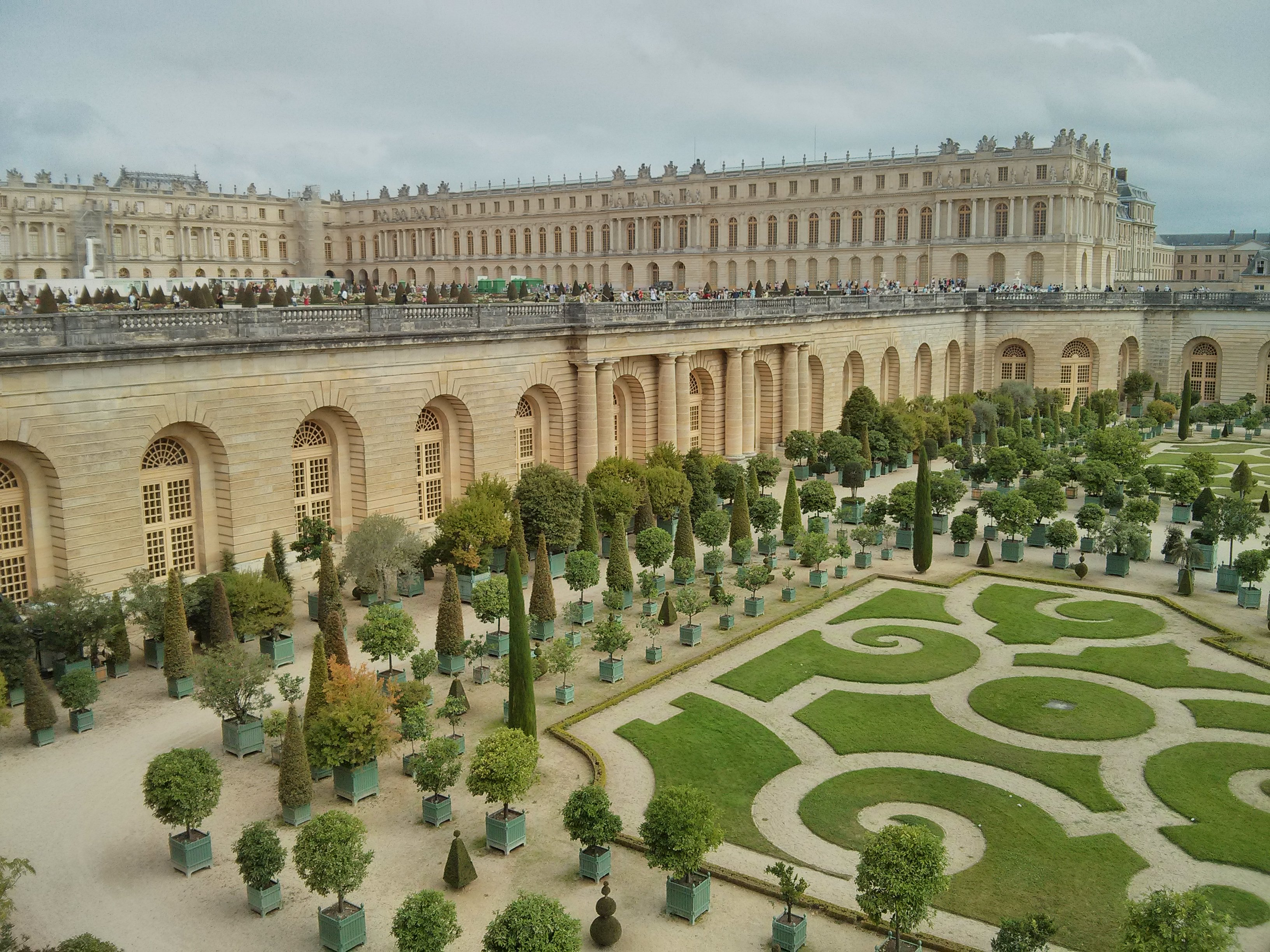
The Orangerie at the Palace of Versailles (1684–86)

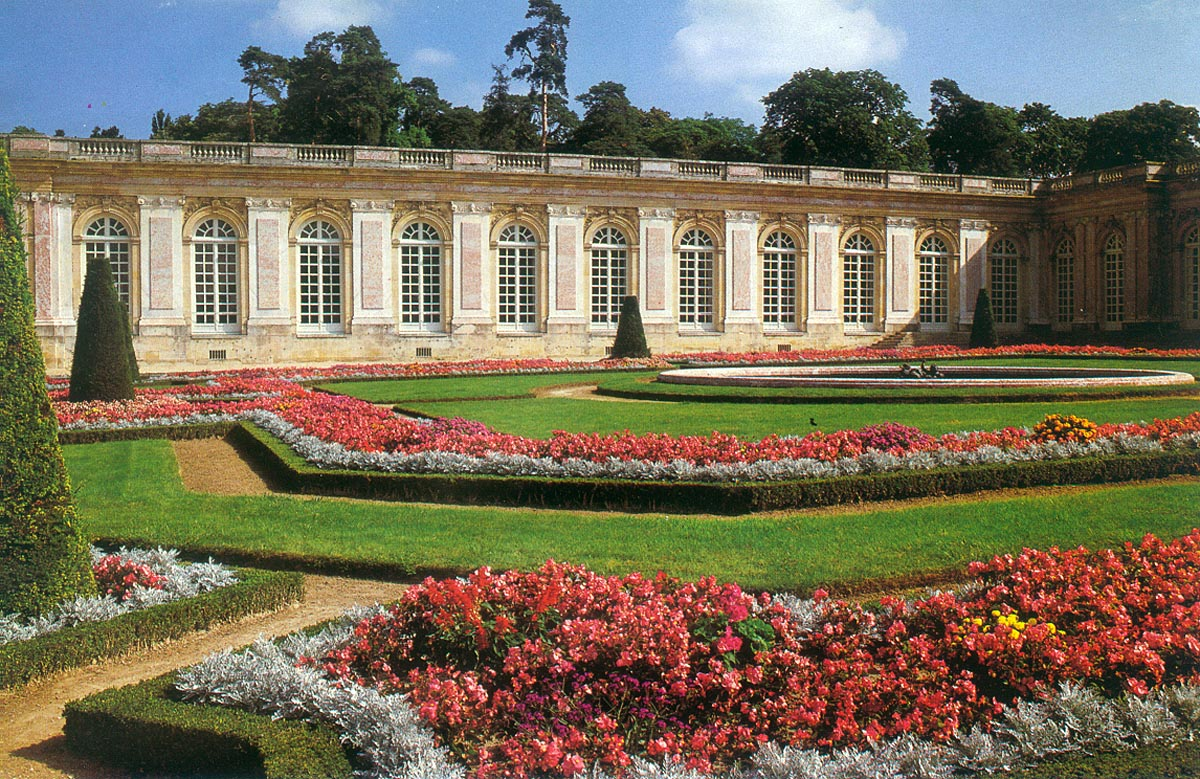
Grand Trianon in Versailles (1687)

From 1677 until his death, Hardouin-Mansart was responsible for the design and construction of much of the Palace of Versailles of Louis XIV. He succeeded the royal architect Louis Le Vau and became the surintendant des Bâtiments du Roi (Superintendent of royal buildings). Beginning in 1678, he completed the "envelope" of new buildings surrounding the original Château by Louis XIII, which had been begun by his predecessor, Louis Le Vau. He transformed the first-floor terrace of the Palace overlooking the garden, into the celebrated Hall of Mirrors, richly decorated by his collaborator, the artist Charles Le Brun. He also reconstructed the façade of the first floor facing the marble courtyard, giving it large arched windows and bringing in more light, and added new central residential wing, also with larger windows, for the royal family. To house the growing number of staff and servants in the Château, he built the Grand Commun (1682–85), and for the horses and carriages of the royal household constructed two palatial stables on the city-side of the Palace (finished in 1682).

His later additions to the Palace included the Orangerie (1684–86), halfway underground at the end of south wing, accessed by two monumental stairways and opening onto its own sunken garden. Toward the end of his life he built a separate smaller one-story palace, the Grand Trianon (1687) as a refuge for the King from the noise and ceremony of the court. His final project at Versilles was the chapel (1699–1710), which was carefully integrated into the architecture of the south wing.

=== Royal Squares ===
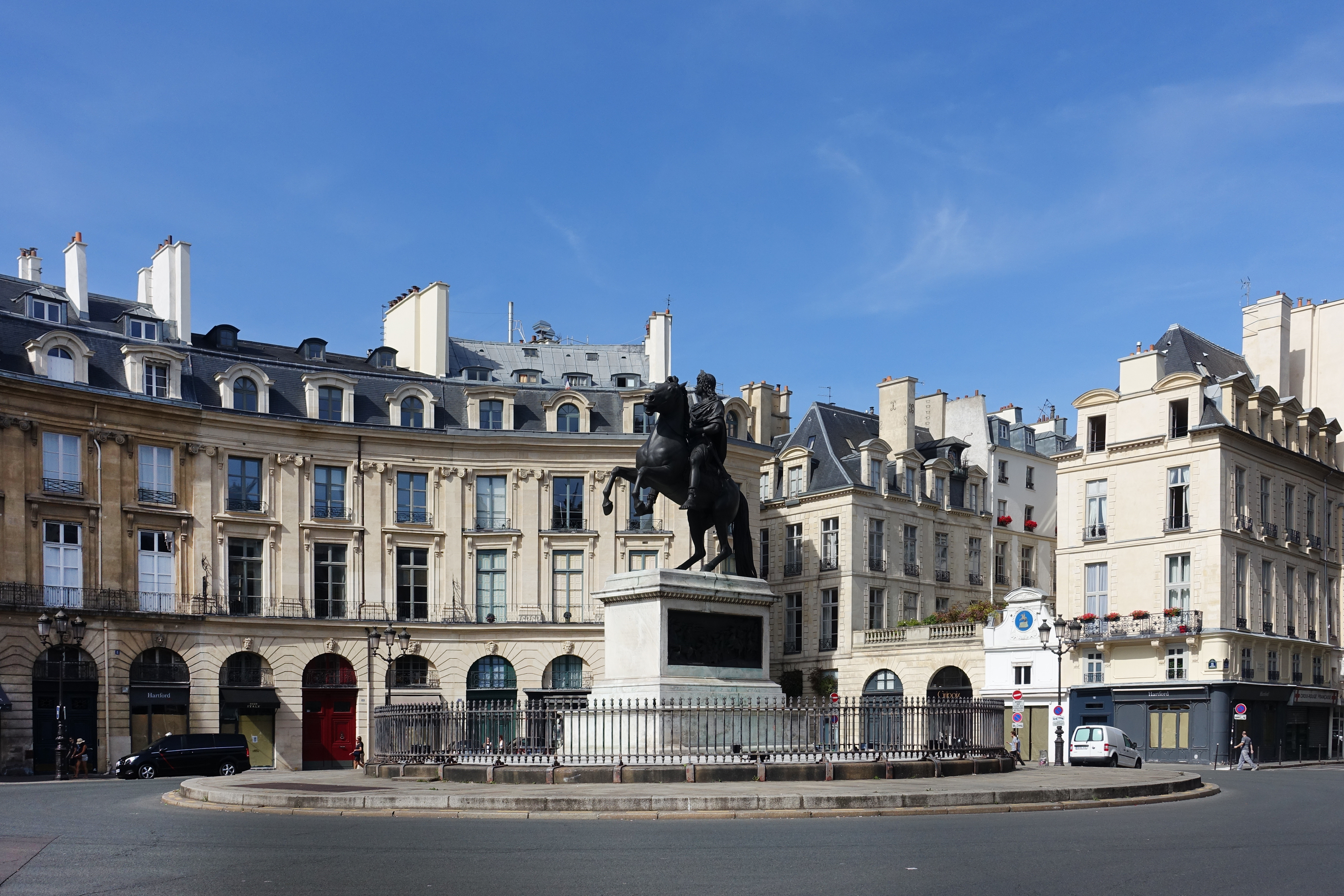
Place des Victoires, Paris

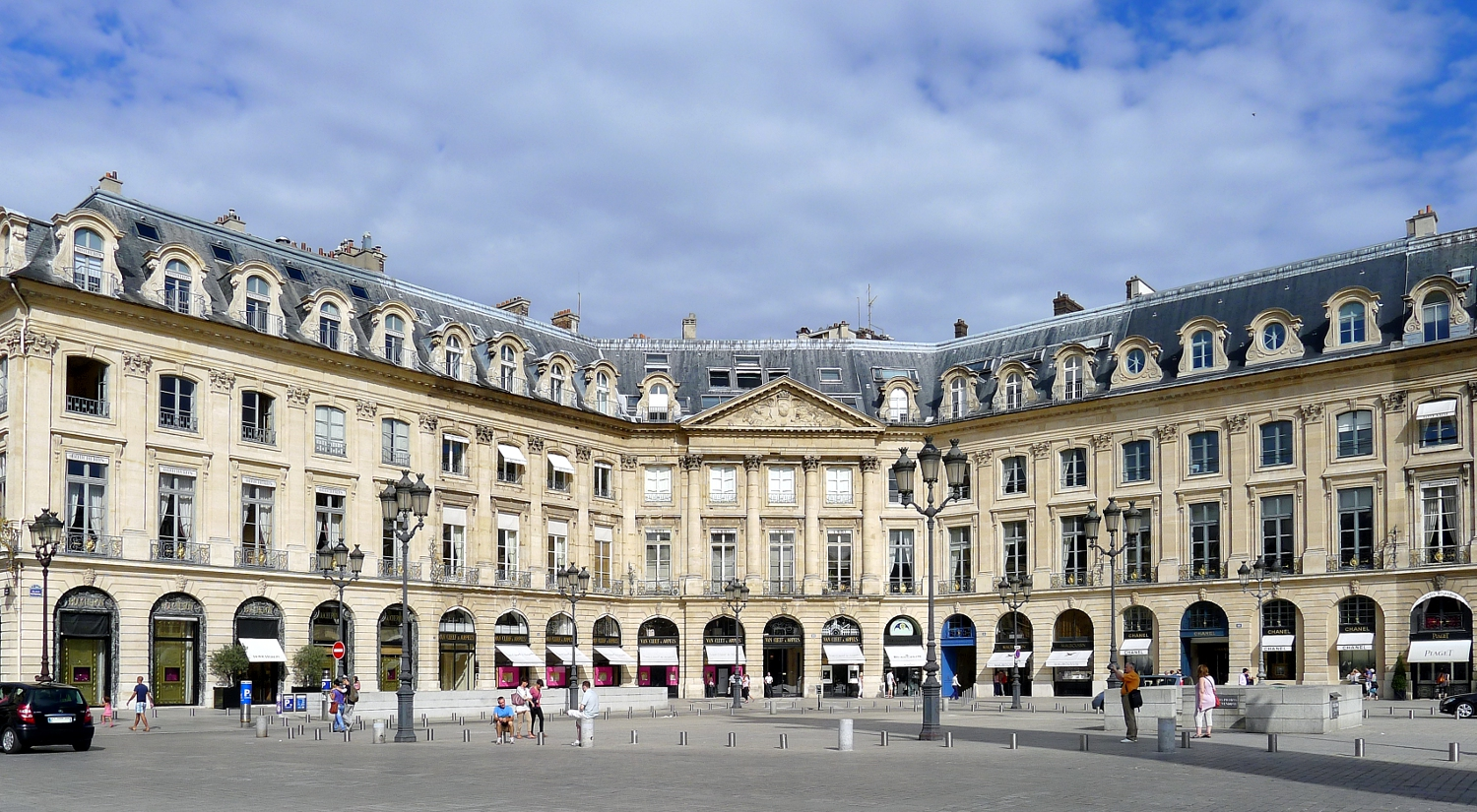
Angled buildings with frontons at corners give variety to Place Vendôme in Paris

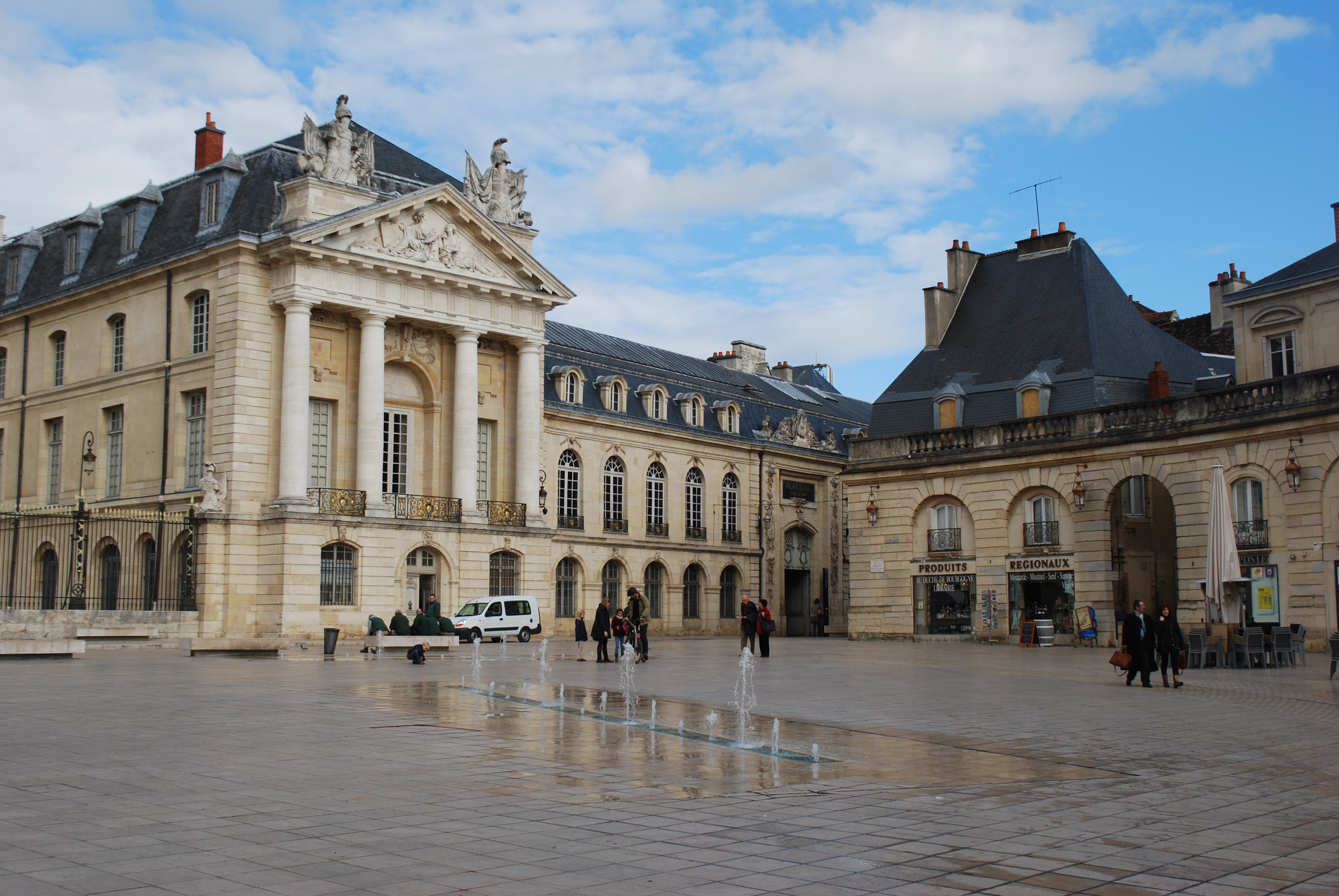
The Place Royale in Dijon

Hardouin-Mansard was also an important urban designer, the creator of two notable Paris residential squares. Both squares, the Place des Victoires (1685) and Place Vendôme (1699), were designed, like his other architecture, to express the majesty and glory of Louis XIV. The Place des Victoires was built as a setting for a monument to Louis XIV, surrounded by a circle of harmonious matching residential buildings. The original statue was melted down after the Revolution, and replaced later by a copy; while the square was much altered in later years, with the addition of traverse streets and buildings in a different style.

The later Place Vendôme was a larger square, but Hardouin-Mansard broke the rigid box shape with corner buildings facing inward, decorated with ornamental pediments.

=== Châteaux ===
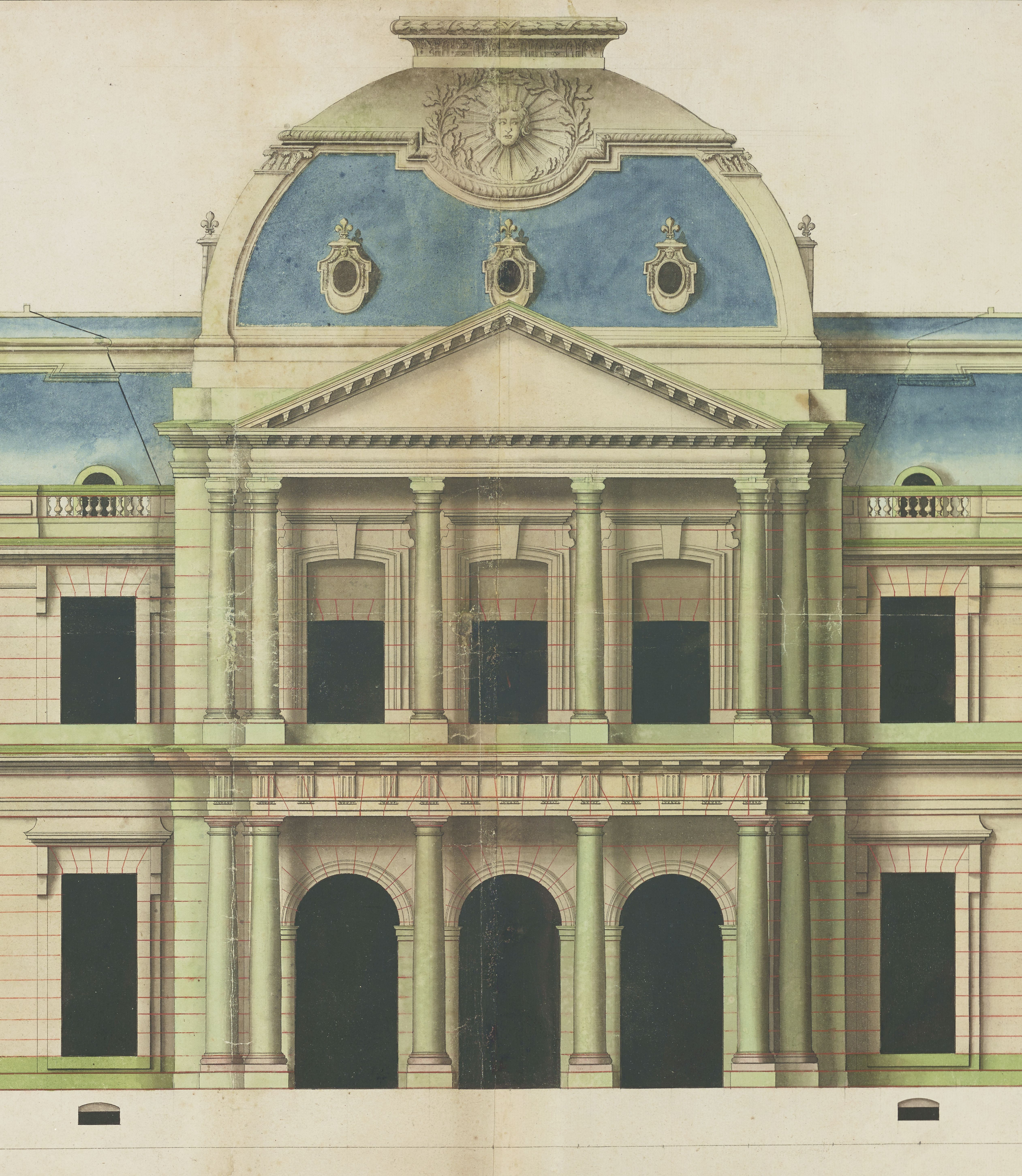
Elevation of the central pavilion of the Château de Clagny, built for Madame de Montespan (1674–1680)]

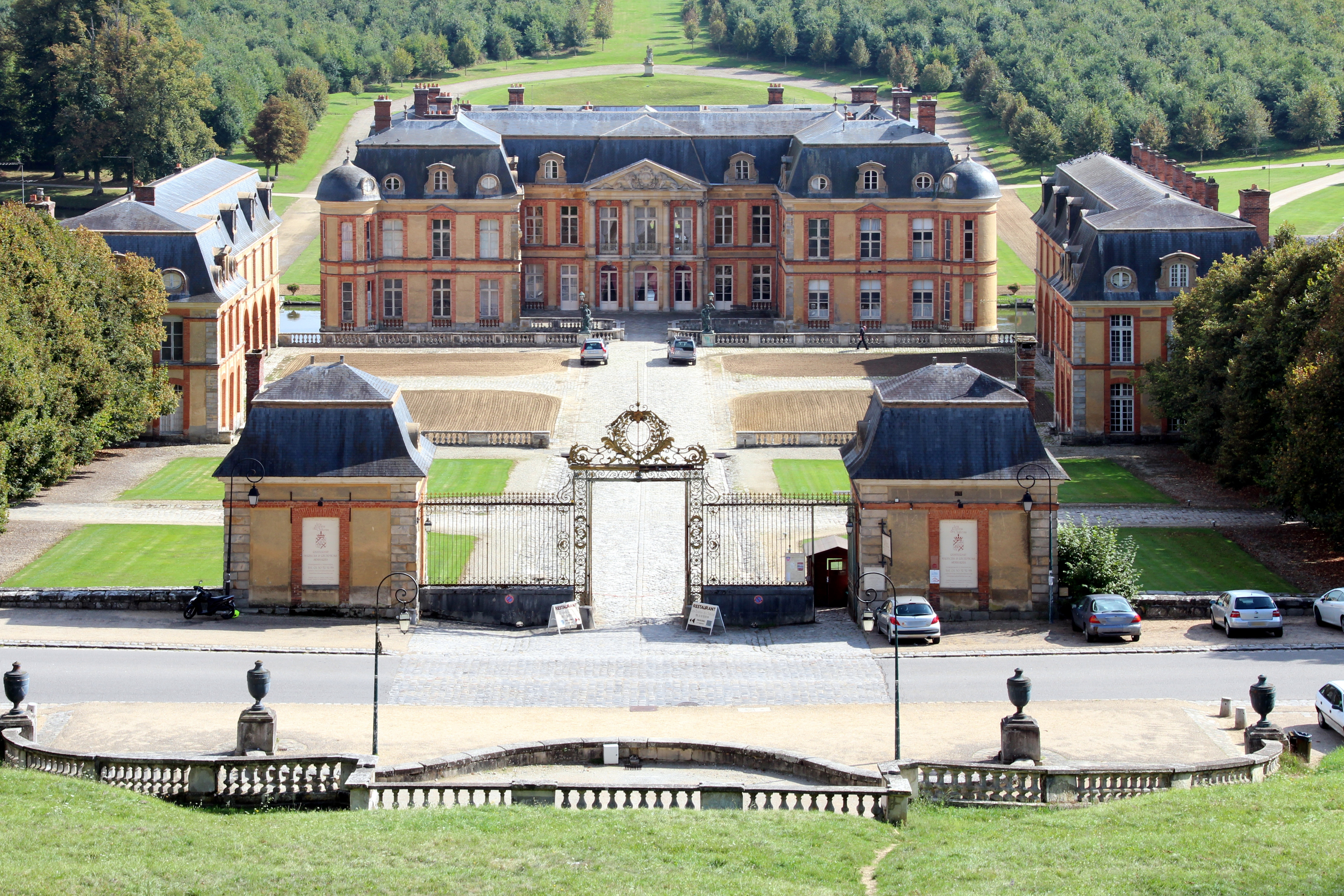
Château de Dampierre

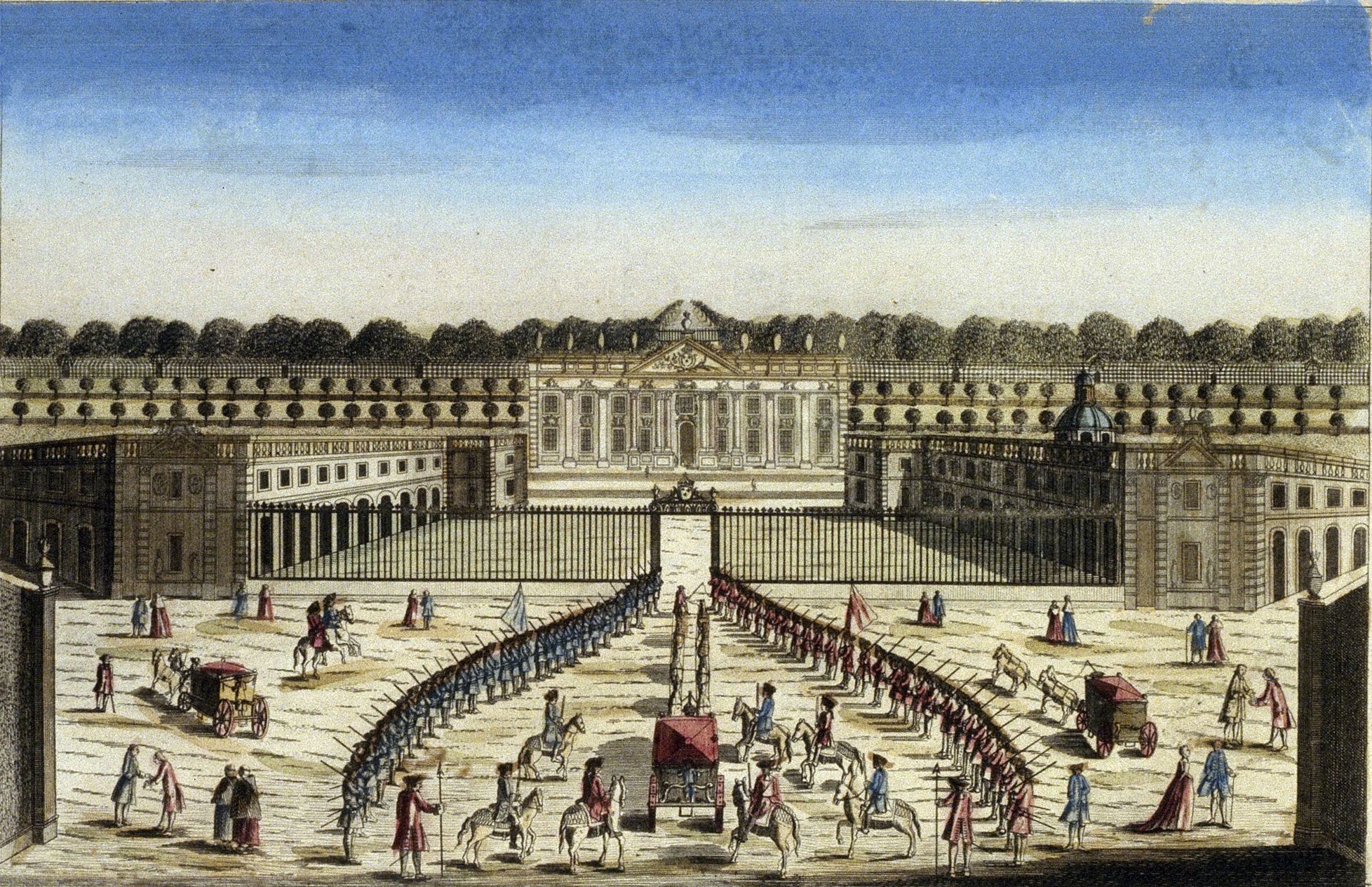
Château de Marly

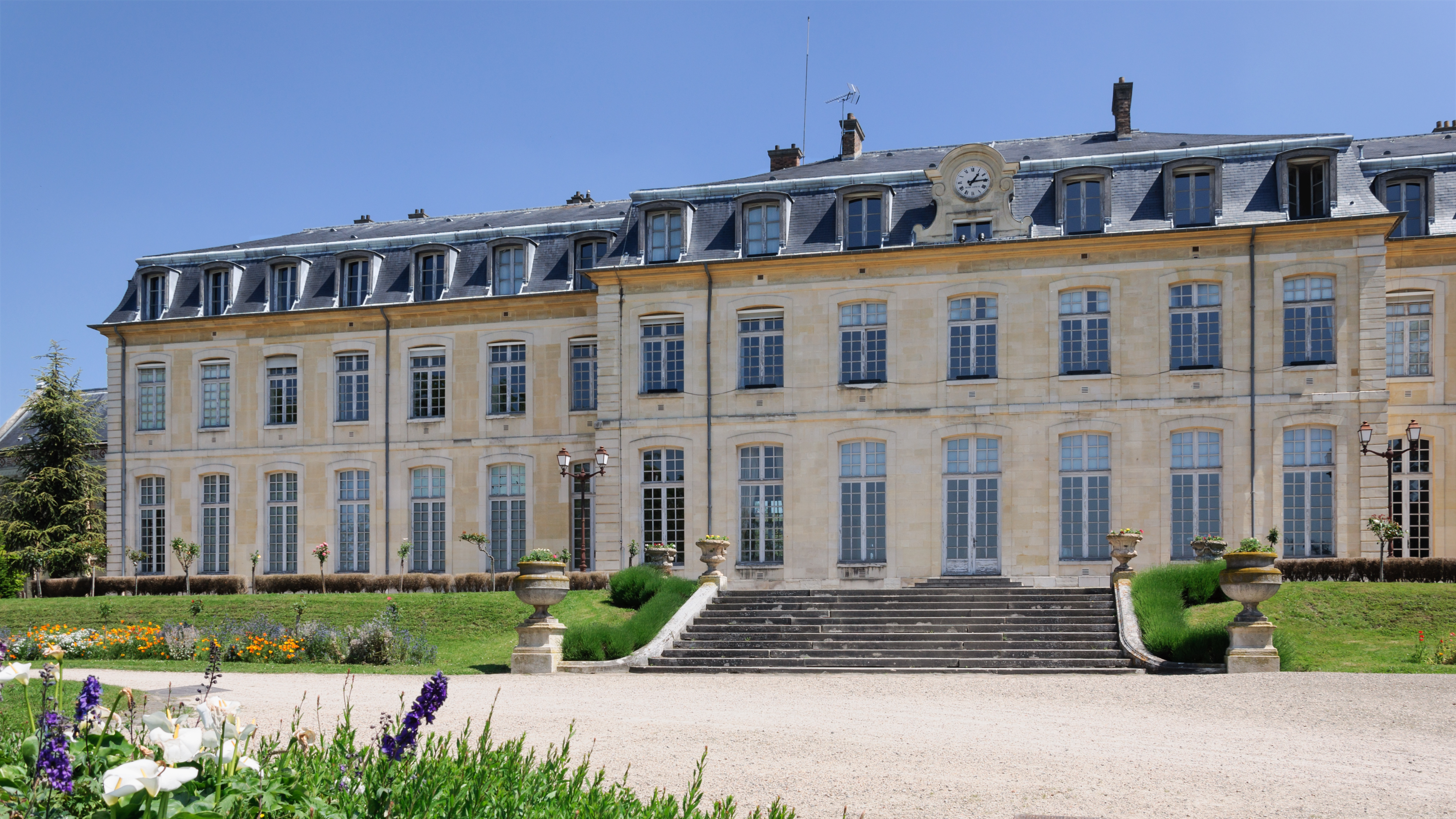
Pavillon Mansart in Vanves

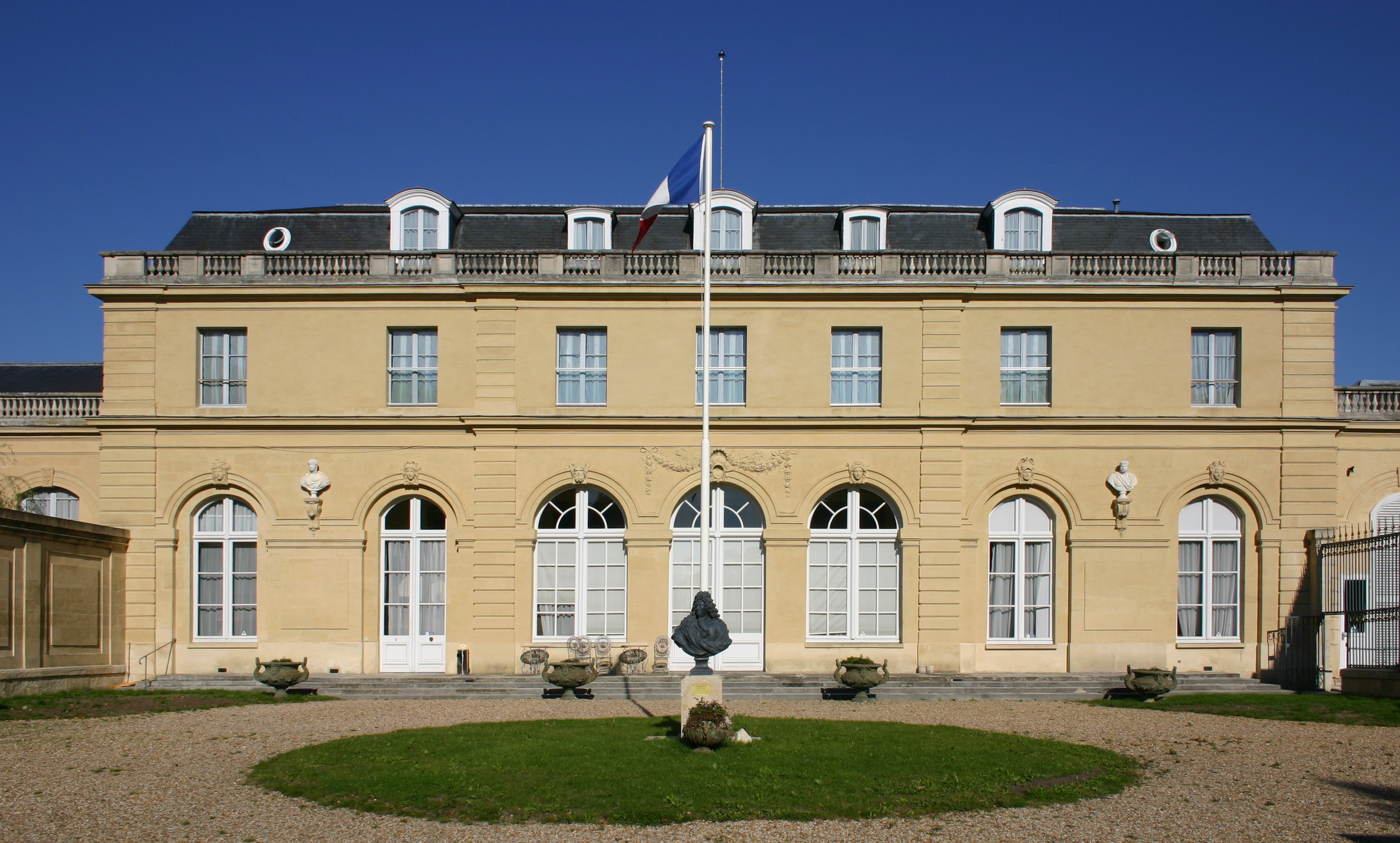
Chateau du Val in Saint Germain en Laye, a former hunting lodge which has since been remodeled (1674)

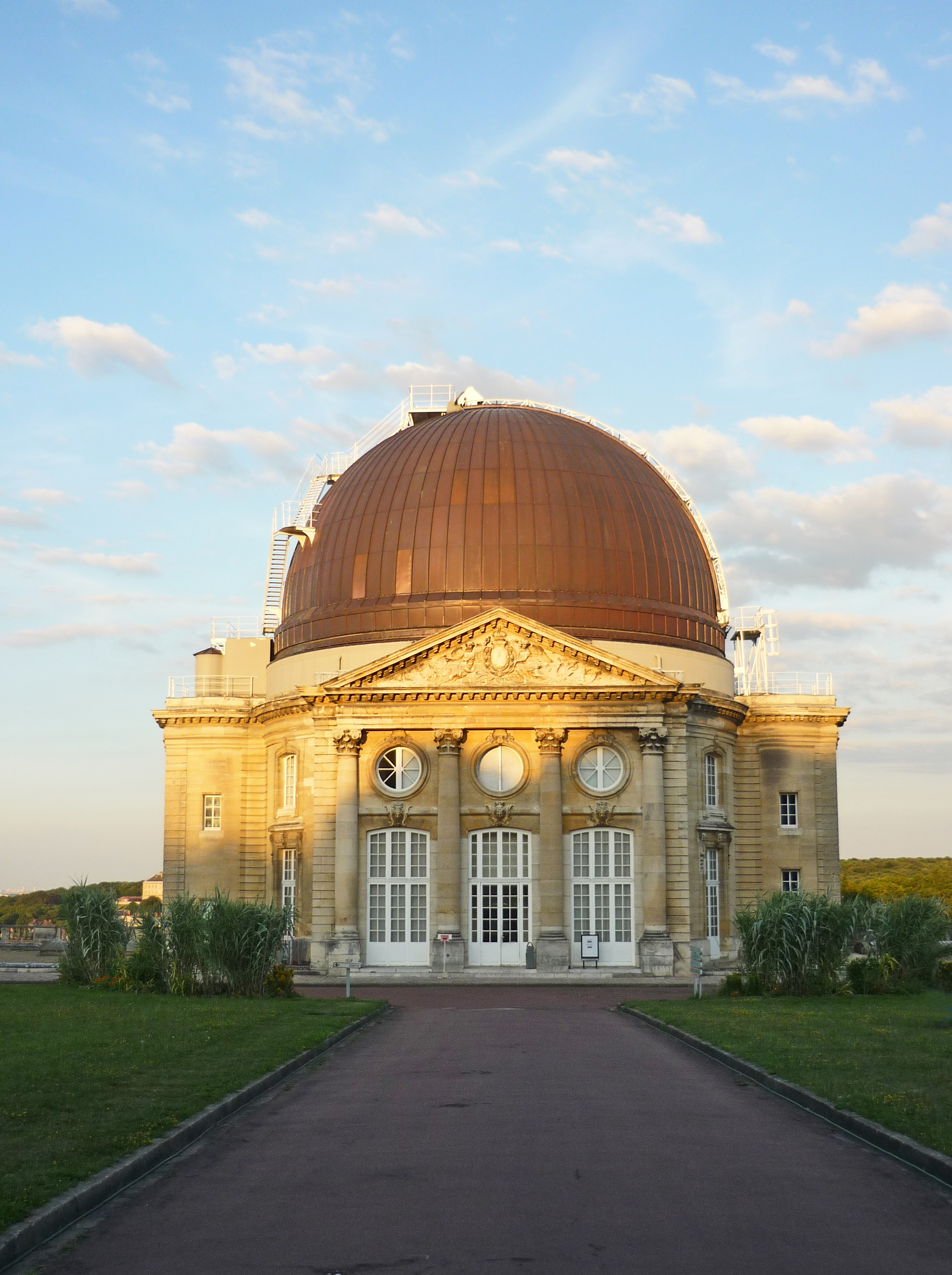
Chateau of Meudon (1705), burned in 1871 and transformed into an observatory after 1877

His most prominent position in France put him in place to create many of the significant monuments of the period, and to set the tone for the restrained French Late Baroque architectural style, somewhat chastened by academic detailing, that was influential as far as Saint Petersburg and even echoed in Constantinople. At the same time, the size of support staff in his official bureaucratic position has often raised criticisms that he was less than directly responsible for the work that was constructed under his name, criticisms that underestimate the discipline control within a large, classically trained studio.

Hardouin-Mansart used the mansard roof (mansarde), named for his great-uncle François Mansart, at the château of Dampierre-en-Yvelines, built for the duc de Chevreuse, Jean-Baptiste Colbert's son-in-law, a patron at the center of Louis XIV's court. This French Baroque château of manageable size lies entre cour et jardin as even Versailles did, the paved and gravel forecourt (cour d'honneur) protected behind fine wrought iron double gates, and enclosed by the main block and its outbuildings (corps de logis), linked by balustrades, symmetrically disposed. A traditional French touch is the modest pedimented entrance flanked by boldly projecting pavilions. Behind, the central axis is extended between the former parterres, now grass. The park with formally shaped water was laid out by André Le Nôtre. There are sumptuous interiors. The small scale makes it easier to compare to the approximately contemporary Het Loo (Netherlands), for William III of Orange.

He died at Marly-le-Roi in 1708.

== Gallery ==
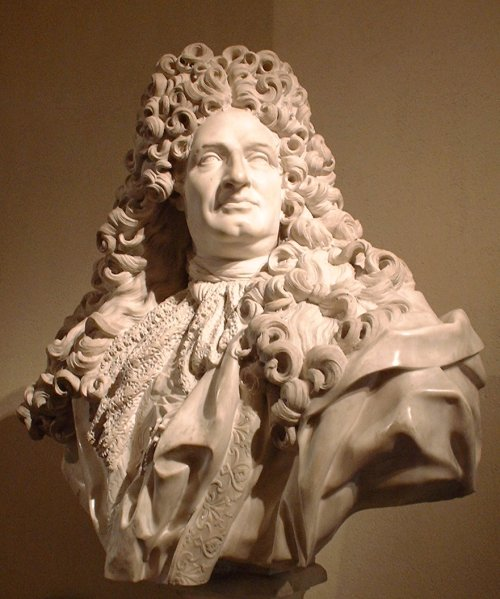
Jules Hardouin-Mansart, marble bust by Jean-Louis Lemoyne

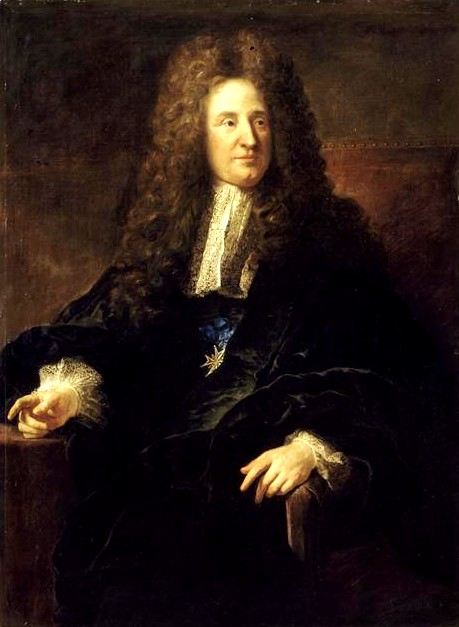
Portrait of Hardouin-Mansart by François de Troy.

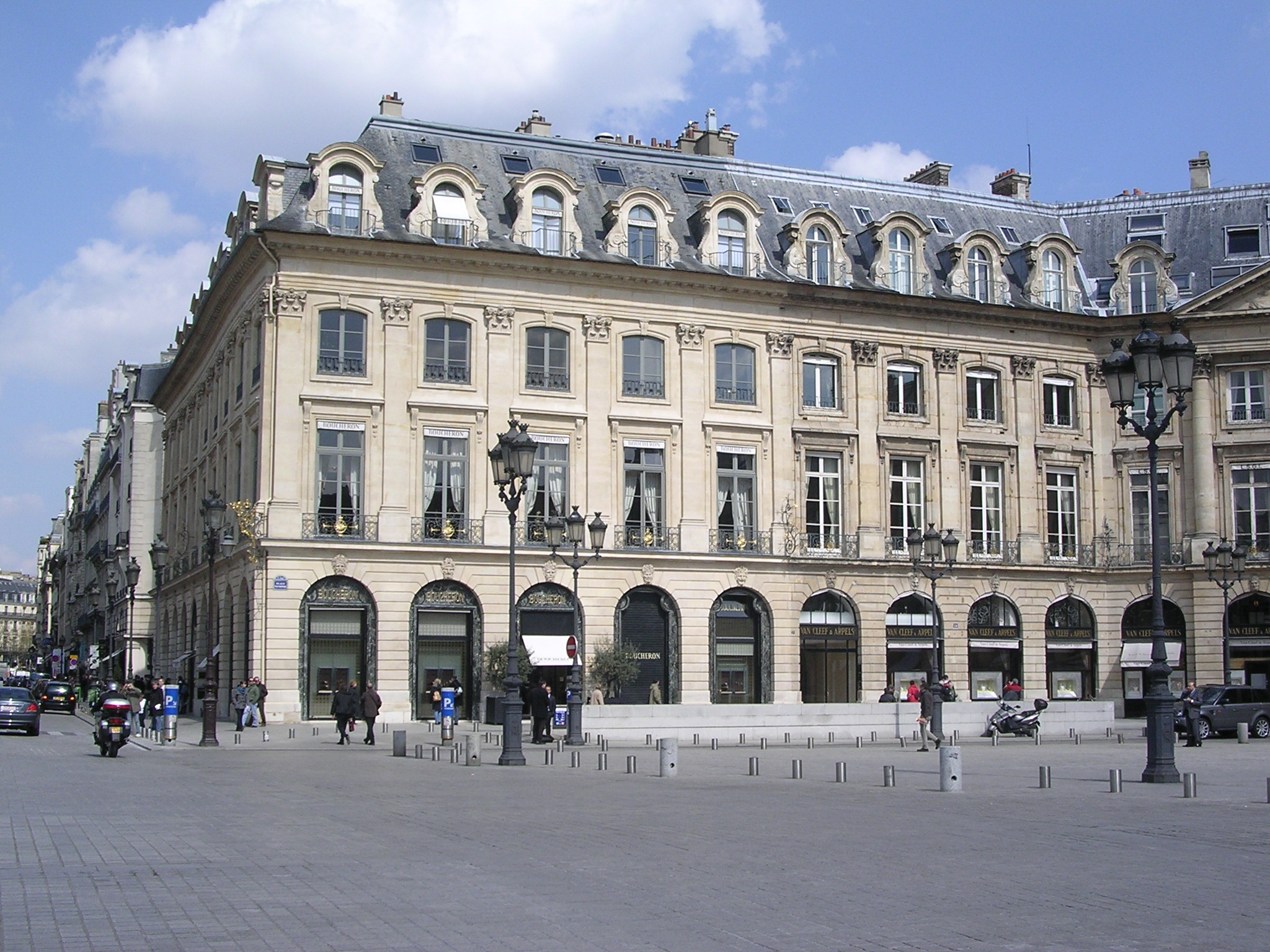
Place Vendôme in Paris by Hardouin-Mansart.

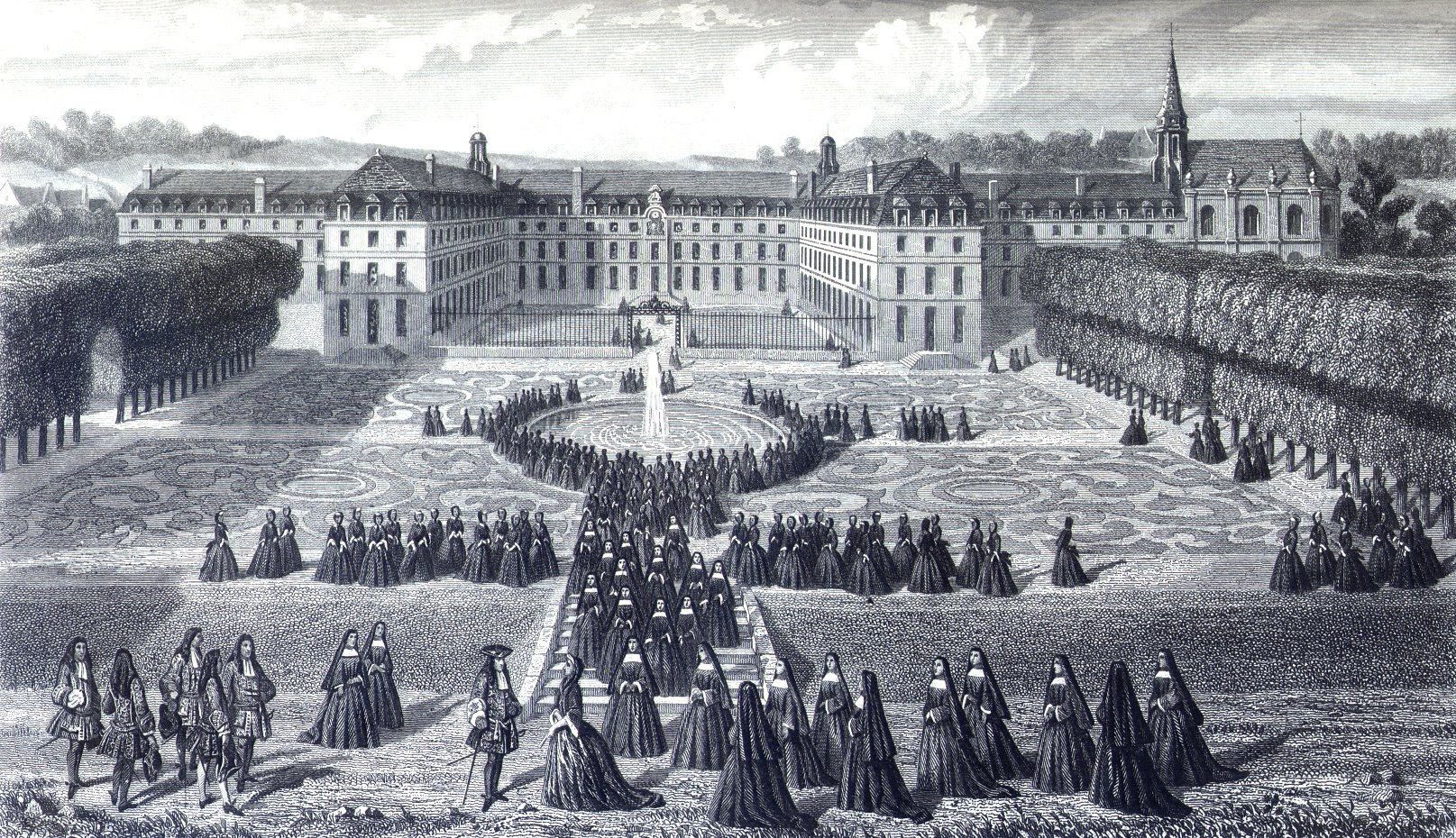
Maison royale de Saint-Louis at Saint Cyr (1684)

== List and dates of notable works ==
- Hôtel de Conti, a town house within La Monnaie in Paris (1669)
- Château de Clagny (1675–1683)
- Palace of Versailles
  - 1677: The Bosquet des Dômes (1677)
  - 1678 à 1684: The Hall of Mirrors (1678–1689)
  - The façade facing the park, and north and center wings (1679–89)
  - The Small and the Great Stables, and the new Orangerie (1684–1686)
  - The Grand Trianon (1687)
  - The Royal Chapel (1698–1710)
  - The Church of Notre-Dame de Versailles (1698–1710)
- Place Vendôme (1677–99)
- Château de Marly (1679–1684) (demolished after the Revolution)
- Hôtel de Ville, Nemours (1669) (formerly the Convent of the Congregation of Notre-Dame)
- Hôtel de Ville, Arles (1676)
- Château de Vall (1674–1677)
- Château de la Chaize in Odenas (1676)
- Pavillon de Manse, at Chantilly (1676–1680)
- Church of Saint-Louis-des-Invalides and a portion of the Hôtel des Invalides (1676–1706)
- Palace of the Bishops of Castres (1677–1679)
- Rebuilding of the Château de Saint-Germain-en-Laye (1680)
- Hôtel de Beauvillier at Versailles (1681)
- Hôtel Colbert de Croissy at Versailles (1682)
- Château de Dampierre, in Dampierre-en-Yvelines (1682–1684)
- Hôtel de Chevreuse at Versailles (1683)
- Completion of the chapel of the Château de Chambord (1684)
- Château de Boury in Boury-en-Vexin (1685)
- Rebuilding of the Palace of the Dukes of Burgundy, Dijon (1685)
- Place des Victoires, Paris (1686)
- The orangerie of the Château de Sceaux (1686)
- The Maison royale de Saint-Louis, at Saint-Cyr-l'École (1686)
- Plans for the Church of Notre-Dame de l'Assomption, in Chantilly (1687–1692)
- Church of Saint-Vigor in Marly-le-Roi (1688–1689)
- Plans for the Château de L'Isle in the Swiss Canton of Vaud
- Reconstruction of the Church of Saint-Louis, Poissy (1695–1708)
- Rebuilding of the Château de Meudon for the Grand Dauphin (1698–1704)
- Château de Vanves, now the administrative building of Lycée Michelet (Vanves) (1698)
- Reconstruction of Hôtel de Ville, Lyon (1701–1703)
- Eglise Saint-Roch, Paris (1701–1722)

== Bibliography ==
- Ducher, Robert (1998). Caractéristique des Styles. Flammarion. ISBN 2-08-011539-1.
- Garms, Jörg (1999). Article on Jules Harouin-Mansart in Dictionnaire des Architects (in French). Encyclopedia Universalis. ISBN 2-226-10952-8.
- Jestaz, Bertrand (1990). L'Hôtel et l'église des Invalides (in French). Picard and Caisse Nationale des Monuments Historiques et des Sites. ISBN 2-7084-0396-6.
- Lacaille, Frédéric (2012). Versailles – 400 ans d'histoire. Paris: Gallimard. ISBN 978-2-07-044430-4.
- Poisson, Michel (2009). 1000 Immeubles et Monuments de Paris (in French). Paris: Parigramme. ISBN 978-2-84096-539-8.

== See also ==
- 17th-century French art

=== External links ===
- Herbermann, Charles, ed. (1913). "Jules Mansard" . Catholic Encyclopedia. New York: Robert Appleton Company.
