= Mont-la-Ville =

- Municipality
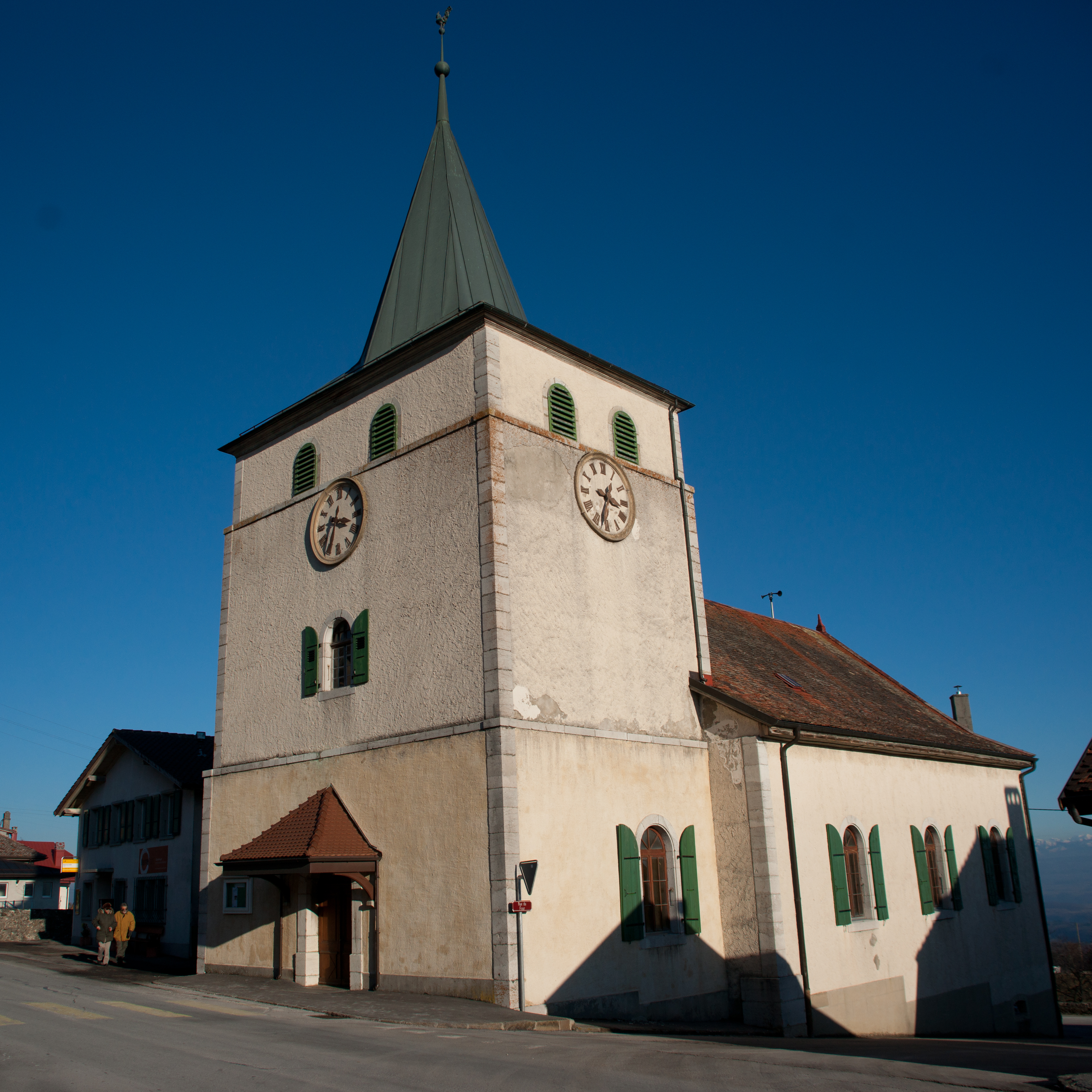
- Mont-la-Ville village church

- Flag Coat of arms
- Location of Mont-la-Ville
- Location within Switzerland Location within Canton of Vaud
- Coordinates: 46.645872°N 6.408861°E
- Country: Switzerland
- Canton: Vaud
- District: Morges

Government
  - Mayor: Syndic; Etienne Clerc

Area
  - Total: 19.75 km^{2} (7.63 sq mi)
- Elevation: 835 m (2,740 ft)

Population (2004)
  - Total: 329
  - Density: 16.7/km^{2} (43.1/sq mi)
- Time zone: UTC+01:00 (CET)
  - Summer (DST): UTC+02:00 (CEST)
- Postal code: 1148
- SFOS number: 5491
- ISO 3166 code: CH-VD
- Localities: Mollendruz
- Surrounded by: Vaulion, Juriens, La Praz, Moiry, Cuarnens, L'Isle, L'Abbaye
- Website: http://mont-la-ville.ch/

Mont-la-Ville is a municipality of the canton of Vaud in Switzerland, located in the district of Morges.

== History ==
Mont-la-Ville is first mentioned in 1140 as in Monte Villa.

== Geography ==
Mont-la-Ville has an area, as of 2009, of 19.75 square kilometers (7.63 sq mi). Of this area, 8.81 km^{2} (3.40 sq mi) or 44.6% is used for agricultural purposes, while 10.32 km^{2} (3.98 sq mi) or 52.3% is forested. Of the rest of the land, 0.58 km^{2} (0.22 sq mi) or 2.9% is settled (buildings or roads) and 0.05 km^{2} (12 acres) or 0.3% is unproductive land.

Of the built up area, housing and buildings made up 0.9% and transportation infrastructure made up 1.9%. Out of the forested land, 49.4% of the total land area is heavily forested and 2.9% is covered with orchards or small clusters of trees. Of the agricultural land, 12.5% is used for growing crops and 7.0% is pastures and 24.8% is used for alpine pastures.

The municipality was part of the Cossonay District until it was dissolved on 31 August 2006, and Mont-la-Ville became part of the new district of Morges.

The municipality is located in the southeast foothills of the Jura Mountains along the road to Mollendruz. It consists of the village of Mont-la-Ville and the hamlet of Chaume as well as scattered farm houses.

== Coat of arms ==
The blazon of the municipal coat of arms is Per pale, Azure and Argent, two Arrowpoints counterchanged, overall in base a Coupeaux Or.

== Demographics ==
Mont-la-Ville has a population (as of December 2020) of 490. As of 2008, 5.0% of the population are resident foreign nationals. Over the last 10 years (1999–2009 ) the population has changed at a rate of 9%. It has changed at a rate of 12.5% due to migration and at a rate of -1.9% due to births and deaths.

Most of the population (as of 2000) speaks French (317 or 96.6%), with German being second most common (5 or 1.5%) and Italian being third (3 or 0.9%).

Of the population in the municipality 112 or about 34.1% were born in Mont-la-Ville and lived there in 2000. There were 146 or 44.5% who were born in the same canton, while 37 or 11.3% were born somewhere else in Switzerland, and 28 or 8.5% were born outside of Switzerland.

In 2008 there were 4 live births to Swiss citizens and were 3 deaths of Swiss citizens and 1 non-Swiss citizen death. Ignoring immigration and emigration, the population of Swiss citizens increased by 1 while the foreign population decreased by 1. There was 1 Swiss man and 4 Swiss women who emigrated from Switzerland. At the same time, there were 2 non-Swiss men who immigrated from another country to Switzerland. The total Swiss population change in 2008 (from all sources, including moves across municipal borders) was an increase of 3 and the non-Swiss population increased by 2 people. This represents a population growth rate of 1.5%.

The age distribution, as of 2009, in Mont-la-Ville is; 35 children or 10.0% of the population are between 0 and 9 years old and 46 teenagers or 13.1% are between 10 and 19. Of the adult population, 36 people or 10.3% of the population are between 20 and 29 years old. 40 people or 11.4% are between 30 and 39, 59 people or 16.9% are between 40 and 49, and 47 people or 13.4% are between 50 and 59. The senior population distribution is 38 people or 10.9% of the population are between 60 and 69 years old, 33 people or 9.4% are between 70 and 79, there are 16 people or 4.6% who are between 80 and 89.

As of 2000, there were 128 people who were single and never married in the municipality. There were 164 married individuals, 23 widows or widowers and 13 individuals who are divorced.

As of 2000, there were 132 private households in the municipality, and an average of 2.5 persons per household. There were 34 households that consist of only one person and 12 households with five or more people. Out of a total of 135 households that answered this question, 25.2% were households made up of just one person and there were 2 adults who lived with their parents. Of the rest of the households, there are 41 married couples without children, 43 married couples with children There were 7 single parents with a child or children. There were 5 households that were made up of unrelated people and 3 households that were made up of some sort of institution or another collective housing.

In 2000 there were 84 single family homes (or 70.6% of the total) out of a total of 119 inhabited buildings. There were 19 multi-family buildings (16.0%), along with 11 multi-purpose buildings that were mostly used for housing (9.2%) and 5 other use buildings (commercial or industrial) that also had some housing (4.2%). Of the single family homes 42 were built before 1919, while 3 were built between 1990 and 2000. The most multi-family homes (16) were built before 1919 and the next most (2) were built between 1996 and 2000.

In 2000 there were 148 apartments in the municipality. The most common apartment size was 4 rooms of which there were 34. There were 10 single room apartments and 58 apartments with five or more rooms. Of these apartments, a total of 127 apartments (85.8% of the total) were permanently occupied, while 8 apartments (5.4%) were seasonally occupied and 13 apartments (8.8%) were empty. As of 2009, the construction rate of new housing units was 0 new units per 1000 residents. The vacancy rate for the municipality, in 2010, was 1.24%.

The historical population is given in the following chart:

== Heritage sites of national significance ==
The prehistoric rock shelter at Mollendruz is listed as a Swiss heritage site of national significance.

== Politics ==
In the 2007 federal election the most popular party was the SVP which received 35.96% of the vote. The next three most popular parties were the SP (22.1%), the Green Party (9.38%) and the LPS Party (8.46%). In the federal election, a total of 108 votes were cast, and the voter turnout was 43.7%.

== Economy ==
As of 2010, Mont-la-Ville had an unemployment rate of 2%. As of 2008, there were 18 people employed in the primary economic sector and about 9 businesses involved in this sector. 1 person was employed in the secondary sector and there was 1 business in this sector. 24 people were employed in the tertiary sector, with 7 businesses in this sector. There were 137 residents of the municipality who were employed in some capacity, of which females made up 43.8% of the workforce.

In 2008 the total number of full-time equivalent jobs was 36. The number of jobs in the primary sector was 14, all of which were in agriculture. The number of jobs in the secondary sector was 1, in construction. The number of jobs in the tertiary sector was 21. In the tertiary sector; 2 or 9.5% were in wholesale or retail sales or the repair of motor vehicles, 16 or 76.2% were in a hotel or restaurant, 2 or 9.5% were in education.

In 2000, there were 10 workers who commuted into the municipality and 101 workers who commuted away. The municipality is a net exporter of workers, with about 10.1 workers leaving the municipality for every one entering. Of the working population, 7.3% used public transportation to get to work, and 73% used a private car.

== Religion ==
From the 2000 census, 61 or 18.6% were Roman Catholic, while 217 or 66.2% belonged to the Swiss Reformed Church. 43 (or about 13.11% of the population) belonged to no church, are agnostic or atheist, and 7 individuals (or about 2.13% of the population) did not answer the question.

== Education ==
In Mont-la-Ville about 125 or (38.1%) of the population have completed non-mandatory upper secondary education, and 28 or (8.5%) have completed additional higher education (either university or a Fachhochschule). Of the 28 who completed tertiary schooling, 57.1% were Swiss men, 25.0% were Swiss women.

In the 2009/2010 school year there were a total of 45 students in the Mont-la-Ville school district. In the Vaud cantonal school system, two years of non-obligatory pre-school are provided by the political districts. During the school year, the political district provided pre-school care for a total of 631 children of which 203 children (32.2%) received subsidized pre-school care. The canton's primary school program requires students to attend for four years. There were 22 students in the municipal primary school program. The obligatory lower secondary school program lasts for six years and there were 23 students in those schools.

As of 2000, there were 30 students in Mont-la-Ville who came from another municipality, while 42 residents attended schools outside the municipality.
