= La Praz =

- Municipality
- Flag Coat of arms
- Location of La Praz
- Location within Switzerland Location within Canton of Vaud
- Coordinates: 46°40′N 06°26′E
- Country: Switzerland
- Canton: Vaud
- District: Jura-Nord Vaudois

Government
  - Mayor: Syndic; Audrey Salzmann

Area
  - Total: 5.13 km^{2} (1.98 sq mi)
- Elevation: 871 m (2,858 ft)

Population (2004)
  - Total: 138
  - Density: 26.9/km^{2} (69.7/sq mi)
- Demonym(s): Les Pratoux; Lè Grezale
- Time zone: UTC+01:00 (CET)
  - Summer (DST): UTC+02:00 (CEST)
- Postal code: 1148
- SFOS number: 5758
- ISO 3166 code: CH-VD
- Surrounded by: Juriens, Moiry, Mont-la-Ville
- Website: https://lapraz.ch/ Profile (in French), SFSO statistics

La Praz is a municipality in the district of Jura-Nord Vaudois in the canton of Vaud in Switzerland.

== History ==
La Praz is first mentioned in 1276 as li Pra.

== Geography ==
La Praz has an area, as of 2009, of 5.1 square kilometers (2.0 mi^{2}). Of this area, 2.34 km^{2} (0.90 mi^{2}) or 45.7% is used for agricultural purposes, while 2.61 km^{2} (1.01 mi^{2}) or 51.0% is forested. Of the rest of the land, 0.17 km^{2} (0.066 mi^{2}) or 3.3% is settled (buildings or roads).

Of the built up area, housing and buildings made up 1.8% and transportation infrastructure made up 1.6%. Out of the forested land, 48.0% of the total land area is heavily forested and 2.9% is covered with orchards or small clusters of trees. Of the agricultural land, 11.3% is used for growing crops and 18.9% is pastures and 15.0% is used for alpine pastures.

The municipality was part of the Orbe District until it was dissolved on 31 August 2006, and La Praz became part of the new district of Jura-Nord Vaudois.

The municipality consists of the linear village of La Praz.

== Coat of arms ==
The blazon of the municipal coat of arms is Argent, a cross Sable, overall crossed in saltire a key and sword Gules.

== Demographics ==
La Praz has a population (as of December 2020) of 175. As of 2008, 3.9% of the population are resident foreign nationals. Over the last 10 years (1999–2009 ) the population has changed at a rate of 26.9%. It has changed at a rate of 23.8% due to migration and at a rate of 2.3% due to births and deaths.

Most of the population (as of 2000) speaks French (111 or 94.9%), with German being second most common (5 or 4.3%) and English being third (1 or 0.9%).

The age distribution, as of 2009, in La Praz is; 22 children or 13.3% of the population are between 0 and 9 years old and 25 teenagers or 15.2% are between 10 and 19. Of the adult population, 20 people or 12.1% of the population are between 20 and 29 years old. 22 people or 13.3% are between 30 and 39, 22 people or 13.3% are between 40 and 49, and 22 people or 13.3% are between 50 and 59. The senior population distribution is 14 people or 8.5% of the population are between 60 and 69 years old, 11 people or 6.7% are between 70 and 79, there are 7 people or 4.2% who are between 80 and 89.

As of 2000, there were 46 people who were single and never married in the municipality. There were 57 married individuals, 10 widows or widowers and 4 individuals who are divorced.

As of 2000, there were 50 private households in the municipality, and an average of 2.3 persons per household. There were 16 households that consist of only one person and 4 households with five or more people. Out of a total of 51 households that answered this question, 31.4% were households made up of just one person. Of the rest of the households, there are 14 married couples without children, 14 married couples with children There were 5 single parents with a child or children. There was 1 household that was made up of unrelated people and 1 household that was made up of some sort of institution or another collective housing.

In 2000 there were 31 single family homes (or 60.8% of the total) out of a total of 51 inhabited buildings. There were 7 multi-family buildings (13.7%), along with 11 multi-purpose buildings that were mostly used for housing (21.6%) and 2 other use buildings (commercial or industrial) that also had some housing (3.9%).

In 2000, a total of 48 apartments (76.2% of the total) were permanently occupied, while 10 apartments (15.9%) were seasonally occupied and 5 apartments (7.9%) were empty. As of 2009, the construction rate of new housing units was 0 new units per 1000 residents. The vacancy rate for the municipality, in 2010, was 0%.

The historical population is given in the following chart:

== Politics ==
In the 2007 federal election the most popular party was the SVP which received 36.84% of the vote. The next three most popular parties were the SP (16.18%), the Green Party (12.67%) and the FDP (11.89%). In the federal election, a total of 59 votes were cast, and the voter turnout was 51.3%.

== Economy ==
As of 2010, La Praz had an unemployment rate of 5.2%. As of 2008, there were 11 people employed in the primary economic sector and about 5 businesses involved in this sector. 1 person was employed in the secondary sector and there was 1 business in this sector. 4 people were employed in the tertiary sector, with 3 businesses in this sector. There were 59 residents of the municipality who were employed in some capacity, of which females made up 40.7% of the workforce.

In 2008 the total number of full-time equivalent jobs was 14. The number of jobs in the primary sector was 9, all of which were in agriculture. The number of jobs in the secondary sector was 1, all of which were in construction. The number of jobs in the tertiary sector was 4. In the tertiary sector; 2 or 50.0% were in wholesale or retail sales or the repair of motor vehicles, 1 was in a hotel or restaurant, .

In 2000, there were 37 workers who commuted away from the municipality. Of the working population, 1.7% used public transportation to get to work, and 71.2% used a private car.

== Religion ==
From the 2000 census, 12 or 10.3% were Roman Catholic, while 83 or 70.9% belonged to the Swiss Reformed Church. Of the rest of the population, there were 10 individuals (or about 8.55% of the population) who belonged to another Christian church. 9 (or about 7.69% of the population) belonged to no church, are agnostic or atheist, and 8 individuals (or about 6.84% of the population) did not answer the question.

== Education ==
In La Praz about 54 or (46.2%) of the population have completed non-mandatory upper secondary education, and 9 or (7.7%) have completed additional higher education (either university or a Fachhochschule). Of the 9 who completed tertiary schooling, 55.6% were Swiss men, 44.4% were Swiss women.

In the 2009/2010 school year there were a total of 22 students in the La Praz school district. In the Vaud cantonal school system, two years of non-obligatory pre-school are provided by the political districts. During the school year, the political district provided pre-school care for a total of 578 children of which 359 children (62.1%) received subsidized pre-school care. The canton's primary school program requires students to attend for four years. There were 11 students in the municipal primary school program. The obligatory lower secondary school program lasts for six years and there were 11 students in those schools.

As of 2000, there were 18 students from La Praz who attended schools outside the municipality.
