= Château de la Chaize =

Coordinates: 46.0897°N 4.6336°E

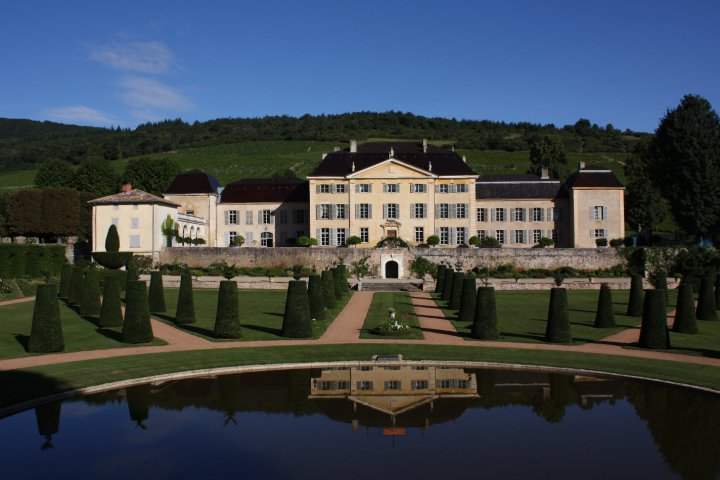
- The Château de la Chaize in 2012
- Interactive map of the Château de la Chaize area

General information
- Type: château
- Location: Odenas, France
- Completed: 1675

The Château de la Chaize is a château in Odenas, Rhône, France. It was completed in 1676. The project was financed by Louis XIV's personal chaplain, François de la Chaise, "and his grateful nephew, the original owner, named the chateau for his munificent uncle." The architect was Jules Hardouin-Mansart, and André Le Nôtre designed the gardens. It has been listed as an official historical monument since April 27, 1972.
