= Chaise longue (disambiguation) =

A chaise longue is an upholstered sofa in the shape of a chair that is long enough to support the legs.

Chaise longue may also refer to:

- Chaise Longue (Le Corbusier), a chair designed by Charlotte Perriand
- "Chaise Longue" (song), a 2021 song by Wet Leg
